= Uru-Eu-Wau-Wau =

Indigenous people of Brazil

Jupaú

Total population
- 152 (November 2023)

Regions with significant populations
- Brazil (Rondônia)

Languages
- Uru-Eu-Wau-Wau dialect

Religion
- Animism

The Uru-Eu-Wau-Wau are an Indigenous people of Brazil, living in the state of Rondônia.

They live in six villages on the borders of the Uru-Eu-Uaw-Uaw Indigenous Territory, which is shared by two other contacted groups, the Amondawa and Uru Pa In, the latter who speak a Chapacuran language, as well as the Jurureí, Parakua, and two uncontacted tribes whose names are not known.

== Name ==
The Uru-Eu-Wau-Wau people call themselves Jupaú. They are also (mistakenly) known as the Amondauas, Bocas-negras, Bocas-pretas, Cabeça-vermelha, Cautários, Sotérios, Urupain, as well as Jupaú, Black-Mouths, Red-Heads, Urueu-Wau-Wau.

== History ==
The Uru-Eu-Wau-Wau came into contact with non-Natives, specifically the National Indian Foundation (FUNAI) in 1981. The subsequent introduction of diseases, and violent attacks by outsiders, caused a drastic decrease in population from the initially estimated count of fewer than 1,000.

Rubber harvesters disputed FUNAI's demarcation of Uru-Eu-Wau-Wau lands. In 1991, one of the world's largest known tin deposits was discovered in Uru-Eu-Wau-Wau lands.

After 1993 their population began increasing again. The Uru-Eu-Uaw-Uaw Indigenous Territory was established by the Brazilian government to protect the tribes and only Indians can legally live in the indigenous territory; however, loggers and miners have regularly invaded their lands. In the 2022 documentary The Territory, released by National Geographic, Bitaté, an Indigenous leader of the Uru-Eu-Wau-Wau, stated the population was approximately 180.

Missionaries are active among the Uru-Eu-Wau-Wau, and a non-governmental organization called Kanindé is trying to fight outside influences and assimilationists on the Uru-Eu-Wau-Wau.

== Language ==
Uru-Eu-Wau-Wau is one of the nine varieties of the Kagwahiva language, a Tupi–Guarani language, subgroup VI.

== Culture ==
The Uru-Eu-Wau-Wau are hunter-gatherers. They use a poison made from tree bark on their arrows when hunting tapir and other game. They are known for their distinctive tattoos around their mouths made from genipapo, a black vegetal dye.

== See also ==
- Friends of Peoples Close to Nature, an NGO human rights organization that has worked with the Uru-Eu-Wau-Wau
- Ten Thousand Years Older, 2002 documentary film about the tribes.
- The Territory, a 2022 documentary, tells the story of these people's struggle to defend their existence from encroaching land grabbers and deforestation.
