= Uru Pa In =

Uru Pa In may be,

- Uru Pa In people
- Uru Pa In language
