= URP =

URP, urp or Urp may refer to:

- Ukrainian Radical Party
- Ukrainian Republican Party
- Union of the Russian People
- United Republican Party (Kenya)
- United Resources Party, based in Papua New Guinea
- United Rhodesia Party
- ARP 410 Airlines, based in Kyiv, Ukraine (by ICAO code)
- Uru-Pa-In language, spoken in Southern Brazil (by ISO code)
