= Chitonahua =

Chitonawa

Total population
- 100 (1995)

Languages
- Yaminawa

The Chitonahua are a Panoan speaking people, an uncontacted people who inhabit the Peruvian Amazon, located in the area of the Murunahua Territorial Reserve, in Ucayali, Peru. They speak a Yaminawa dialect called Chitonawa.
