= José Carlos Meirelles =

Brazilian sertanista

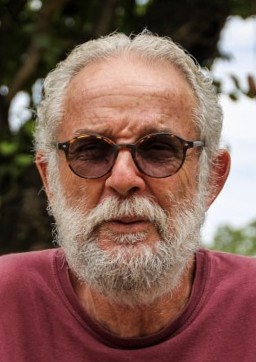
- Meirelles in 2013
- Born: 1948 (age 77–78); Ribeirão Preto, São Paulo, Brazil
- Employer: FUNAI

José Carlos dos Reis Meirelles Júnior (Ribeirão Preto, 1948) is a Brazilian that works for FUNAI, the agency that protects native Americans in Brazil. He is a specialist in uncontacted peoples.

== Early life ==
Meirelles was born in Ribeirão Preto, in a family of explorers and cattle herders. He was raised in the small town of Santa Rita do Passa Quatro (São Paulo). When he was young, he gave up his studies in engineering and moved to the city of São Paulo. He took a course on indigenous studies and after a short introductory course, he was sent to Maranhão to work with the Urubu-Kaapor and then the Awá (Guajá), with whom first contact had been made.

== FUNAI ==
Meirelles quit engineering in 1970 to work at FUNAI. In 1976, he became head of a FUNAI outpost in Acre, near the Iaco River. There, among the Manchineri and Jaminawa peoples, he would spend ten years of his life.

In 1988, he became one of the principal advocates of the policy of preserving the isolation of Indians who showed no interest in contacting “whites”. This policy followed the traditional stance of anthropologists and governments, based on contact to "protect", "acculturate", and "integrate" indigenous peoples.

Meirelles has been part of the leadership of the FUNAI's Isolated Indians group (Índios Isolados da FUNAI) since its creation in 1987 by Sydney Possuelo, a specialist in indigenous issues, and he also coordinates the Ethnoenvironmental Protection Front of the Envira River (Frente de Proteção Etnoambiental do Rio Envira (FPERE)) , in Acre, headquartered in the city of Feijó. In this capacity he has faced various dangers: he was shot in the face with an arrow in 2004 and, in the 1980s, his group was attacked by isolated Indians. Meirelles killed one of them in order to keep his father-in-law from being killed, something he now considers one of the great traumas of his life.
