= Kampa and Envira River Isolated Peoples Indigenous Territory =

Indigenous Territory in Acre State, Brazil

Kampa Indigenous Territory and Envira River Isolated Peoples (Portuguese: Terra Indígena Kampa e Isolados do Rio Envira) is an indigenous territory in Acre State, Brazil, which has been dedicated to uncontacted natives. The area is inhabited by the Ashaninka, Envira River Isolated Mashko, and the Xinane people, who speak a Panoan language related to Yaminawa and live by the Xinane Stream (Portuguese: Igarapé Xinane), an affluent of the Envira River.

It is located on the Peruvian border and is buffered to the north by other reservations, so that in the last few years no people from the outside world have set foot on the TI.

== See also ==
- Indigenous peoples in Brazil
