= Iniciativa Amotocodie =

Iniciativa Amotocodie is an organization that, since 2002, has been dedicated to defending the self-determination of the Ayoreo groups living in voluntary isolation and supporting the collective process of the Ayoreo people in their defense of their human, cultural, and territorial rights.

Recognizing the great significance of the sustainable way of life of those in isolation, who live in harmony with nature, it promotes a process of intercultural learning between life in the forest and the modern world. This ensures not only the physical survival of the isolated groups but also the preservation of the meaning of their way of life for the rest of humanity and our future.

== See also ==
- Survival International
