= Flecheiros =

Uncontacted tribe

The Flecheiros are one of the uncontacted peoples in the Javari region of the Amazon. The ambiguous Portuguese name simply means "arrow shooters".

== Region ==
The Flecheiros live in the far west of Brazil, in the Vale do Javari Indigenous Territory, an area covering 83,000 square kilometres (32,000 sq mi). Access to the Vale do Javari Indigenous Territory is limited by the government of Brazil to protect the indigenous groups inhabiting the area and the environment on which they depend for their traditional lifeways from exploitation by loggers, miners, poachers, drug traffickers and others. Several other indigenous peoples live in this territory, including the Kanamari and the Tsohom Djapa, who speak languages in the Katukina family, the Matis, the Marubo, the Kulina Pano, the Korubo and the Matses or Mayoruna, who speak Panoan languages. The region is also home to certain other groups of uncontacted peoples. Contact with uncontacted peoples is prohibited by the government of Brazil, even with respect to other indigenous groups living traditional lifeways, but state capacity is low in these areas and monitoring or enforcement is difficult.

== Language ==
Flecheiros
- (unattested)
- Native to: Brazil
- Region: Javari
- Ethnicity: "Flecheiros"
- Language family: unclassified (Katukinan?)

Language codes
- ISO 639-3: None (mis)
- Glottolog: flec1235

Ethnographically, the people are similar to the Kanamari. However, a meeting between a Kanamarí and the Flecheiros was observed, showing that the two have different languages. Their language is thus unknown and unattested. Similarities in arrow design with another "uncontacted" tribe contacted by the Kanamari, the Tsohom Djapa 'toucan people', who speak the same language as the Kanamarí, suggest that the Flecheiros may be related to or the same as them.

== Culture ==
Little is known about the Fleicheros due to their apparent preference not to engage with the world community and the Brazilian government's policy of preventing contact by outsiders. However, limited expeditions in and around Flecheiro territory by FUNAI officials have produced evidence that the Flecheiros hunt various animals, including peccary, tapir, capybara, caiman, sloth and various species of monkey using bamboo arrows with fire-hardened tips and blowguns, both enhanced with curare poison.

They cultivate rocas – temporary jungle plantations used for a few years at a time – to grow sugarcane, cotton (with which to pack blowguns), manioc, and plantains. It is not known how plantains and sugarcane, imports from South Asia, came to the Flecheiros. They forage a variety of jungle foods including caterpillars and prized yellow-spotted river turtle eggs. Palm fruits are also consumed. They brew saliva-fermented casava beer. Meats are preserved by smoking.

The Flecheiros make earthenware pottery and appear to have some limited access to metal tools, likely taken from loggers and fisherman illegally encroaching on their territory.

They build palm-thatched huts called malocas in communities of about 50–60 people and make use of sleeping hammocks like many Amazonian tribes. Smaller structures are built at temporary campsites.

They make use of ceremonial bark masks and annato-based urucum dye., and make large dugout canoes propelled by poling against the riverbed.

Men wear very little clothing.

== History ==
It is not known whether the Flecheiros are a historically distinct people or whether current Flecheiro groups were thrown together in the turbulence accompanying Brazilian contact with previously isolated indigenous tribes in the 1970s (or earlier). "Uncontacted" as a label can be misleading, with some scholars and activists preferring the description "living in voluntary isolation". The Flecheiros recognize non-indigenous people and weapons. They are generally hostile to interlopers. They are likely to be immunologically naive.

In the 1980s, loggers harvesting timber along the Sao Jose Creek met with repeated violent attacks by Flecheiros.

The Flecheiros are the subject of a book called The Unconquered: In Search of the Amazon's Last Uncontacted Tribes, by Scott Wallace, (Crown, 2011.) The book builds on a cover story by Wallace and photographer Nicolas Reynard in the August 2003 National Geographic that details the 76-day expedition in 2002, led by famed indigenous activist Sydney Possuelo, who sought to check on the wellbeing of the Flecheiros in the Vale do Javari Indigenous Land without making contact with them.

In September 2017, the Brazilian government investigated a reported massacre in August of about 10 members of the tribe who were gathering yellow-spotted river turtle eggs along a river when they were killed by gold miners. The miners had bragged about "cutting up the bodies and throwing them in the river."
