= Uru-Eu-Uaw-Uaw Indigenous Territory =

Indigenous territory in Rondônia, Brazil

Terra Indigena Uru-Eu-Uaw-Uaw is an indigenous territory located in central Rondônia, Brazil. It has a contacted Indian population of around 168 people belonging to Amondaua, Uru Pa In, Juma, and Jupaú tribes (as of 2002). There remains an unknown number of uncontacted Indians who belong to 4 to 6 different tribes like Jururei, Yvyraparaquara, Uru Pa In (uncontacted bands), and Parakua. The uncontacted population was estimated at somewhere between 1,000 and 1,200 in 1986, but it has declined very steeply in the recent decades. It is one of the most unsafe indigenous territories in Brazil and is regularly invaded by loggers and ranchers. The Jururei tribe was subjected to mass killings in 2003 and 2005. Most of the Jupaú are now Christian, while the other tribes are entirely animist.
