= Uncontacted peoples =

Peoples living without sustained contact to the world community

Uncontacted peoples are groups of indigenous peoples living without sustained direct relations with the world community. Generally such peoples are aware of the outside world, and have or had interactions with neighboring peoples, or may have had sustained contact with the wider world in the past. Indigenous peoples in voluntary isolation are groups who decide to remain uncontacted. Legal protections make estimating the total number of uncontacted peoples challenging, but estimates from the Inter-American Commission on Human Rights in the UN and the nonprofit group Survival International point to between 100 and 200 uncontacted tribes numbering up to 10,000 individuals total. In 2025, Survival International published the first comprehensive report on uncontacted peoples worldwide. It found robust evidence of 196 uncontacted peoples living in ten countries across South America, Asia and the Pacific. The vast majority of uncontacted peoples live in the Amazon rainforest in South America, especially Brazil, where Survival has found evidence of 124 groups.

Knowledge of uncontacted peoples comes mostly from encounters with neighbouring indigenous communities and aerial footage.

== Definition ==
Uncontacted peoples generally refers to indigenous peoples who have remained largely isolated to the present day, whose lifestyles are detached from the influences of the world community, and who function mostly independently from any political or governmental entities. Uncontacted specifically refers to a lack of sustained contact with the majority of non-Indigenous society at present as most Indigenous groups have had some form of contact with other peoples; European exploration and colonization during the early modern period brought Indigenous peoples worldwide into contact with colonial settlers and explorers.

Survival International's 2025 report defines uncontacted peoples as those who "reject contact with outsiders as an active and ongoing choice .... they resist intrusion, and thrive when their rights are respected".

The Inter-American Commission on Human Rights refers to uncontacted peoples as "Indigenous peoples in voluntary isolation". The Commission defines these groups by their general rejection of contact with anyone outside of their own people. This definition also includes groups who have previously had sustained contact with the majority non-Indigenous society but have chosen to return to isolation and no longer maintain contact. As such, uncontacted peoples are contemporaries of modernity, not living in an anachronistic state of nature.

A 2009 United Nations report also classified "peoples in initial contact" as sharing the same characteristics who transition to regularly communicating with and integrating into mainstream society.

To highlight their agency in staying uncontacted or isolated, international organizations emphasize calling them "Indigenous peoples in isolation" or "in voluntary isolation". Otherwise, they have also been called "hidden peoples" or "uncontacted tribes".

Historically, European colonial ideas of uncontacted peoples, and their colonial claims over them, were informed by the imagination of and search for Prester John, king of a wealthy Christian realm in isolation, as well as the Ten Lost Tribes of Israel, identifying uncontacted peoples as "lost tribes".

== Relations with outsiders ==
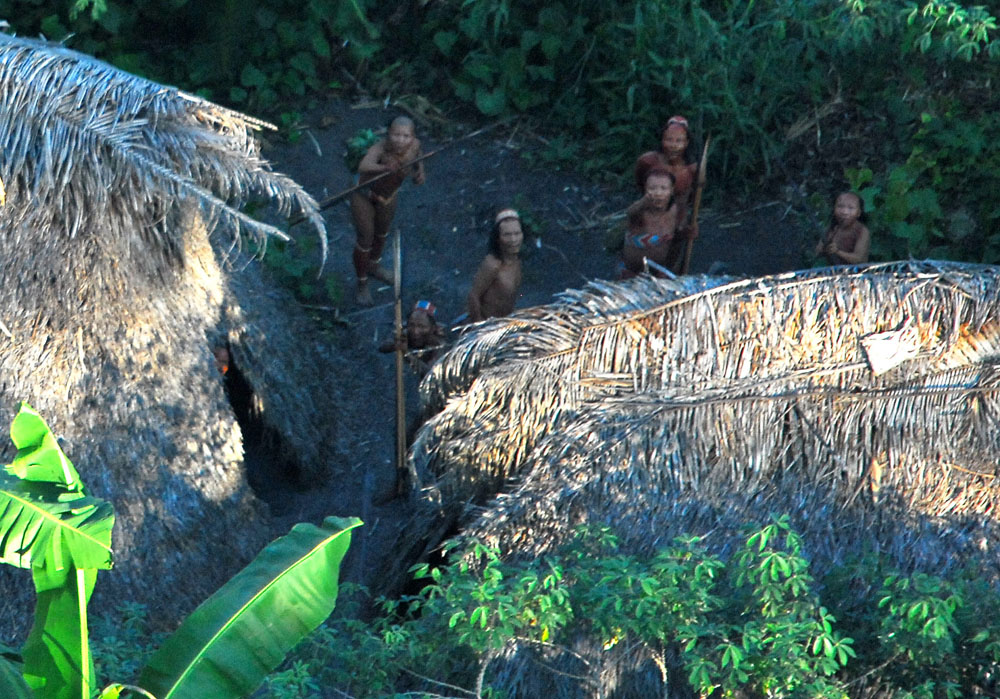
Uncontacted peoples in the state of Acre in Brazil

International organizations have highlighted the importance of protecting indigenous peoples' environment and lands, of protecting them from exploitation or abuse, and of no contact to prevent the spread of modern diseases. In their 2025 report, Survival International predicted that almost half of the world's 196 uncontacted peoples could be wiped out within 10 years. The report states that the threats to uncontacted peoples mostly come from extractive industries, such as logging, mining, and oil and gas extraction. Other threats include criminal gangs, missionaries, and social media influencers.

Historic exploitation and abuse at the hands of the majority group have led many governments to give uncontacted people their lands and legal protection. Many Indigenous groups live on national forests or protected grounds, such as the Vale do Javari in Brazil or North Sentinel Island in India.

In 1961, British explorer Richard Mason was killed by an uncontacted Amazonian tribe, the Panará. The Panará lived in relative isolation until 1973 when the government project (Cuiabá-Santarém) road BR-163 was built through their territory. Consequently, the tribe suffered from newly introduced diseases and environmental degradation of their land. Of the more than 350 members of the Panará tribe, more than 250 perished in the first twelve months after their first contact with settlers.

Much of the contention over uncontacted peoples has stemmed from governments' desire to extract natural resources. In the 1960s and 1970s, Brazil's federal government attempted to assimilate and integrate native groups living in the Amazon jungle to use their lands for farming. Their efforts were met with mixed success and criticism until, in 1987, Brazil created the Department of Isolated Indians inside the Fundação Nacional do Índio (FUNAI), Brazil's Indian Agency. FUNAI was successful in securing protected lands which have allowed certain groups to remain relatively uncontacted.

A different outcome occurred in Colombia when an evangelical group contacted the Nukak tribe of Indigenous people. The tribe was receptive to trade and eventually moved to have closer contact with settlers. This led to an outbreak of respiratory infections, violent clashes with illicit drug traffickers, and the death of hundreds of the Nukak—more than half of the tribe. Eventually, the Colombian government forcibly relocated the tribe to a nearby town where they received food and government support but were reported as living in poverty.

The dangers to isolated peoples demonstrated by contact with the Nukak tribe are generally shared across uncontacted peoples, particularly the desire of both national governments and private groups to exploit their lands for financial or social gain. This can include lumbering, ranching and farming, land speculation, oil prospecting and mining, and poaching. For example, then-Peruvian President Alan García claimed in 2007 that uncontacted groups were only a "fabrication of environmentalists bent on halting oil and gas exploration". As of 2016, a Chinese subsidiary mining company in Bolivia ignored signs that they were encroaching on uncontacted tribes, and attempted to cover it up. In addition to commercial pursuits, other people such as missionaries can cause great damage.

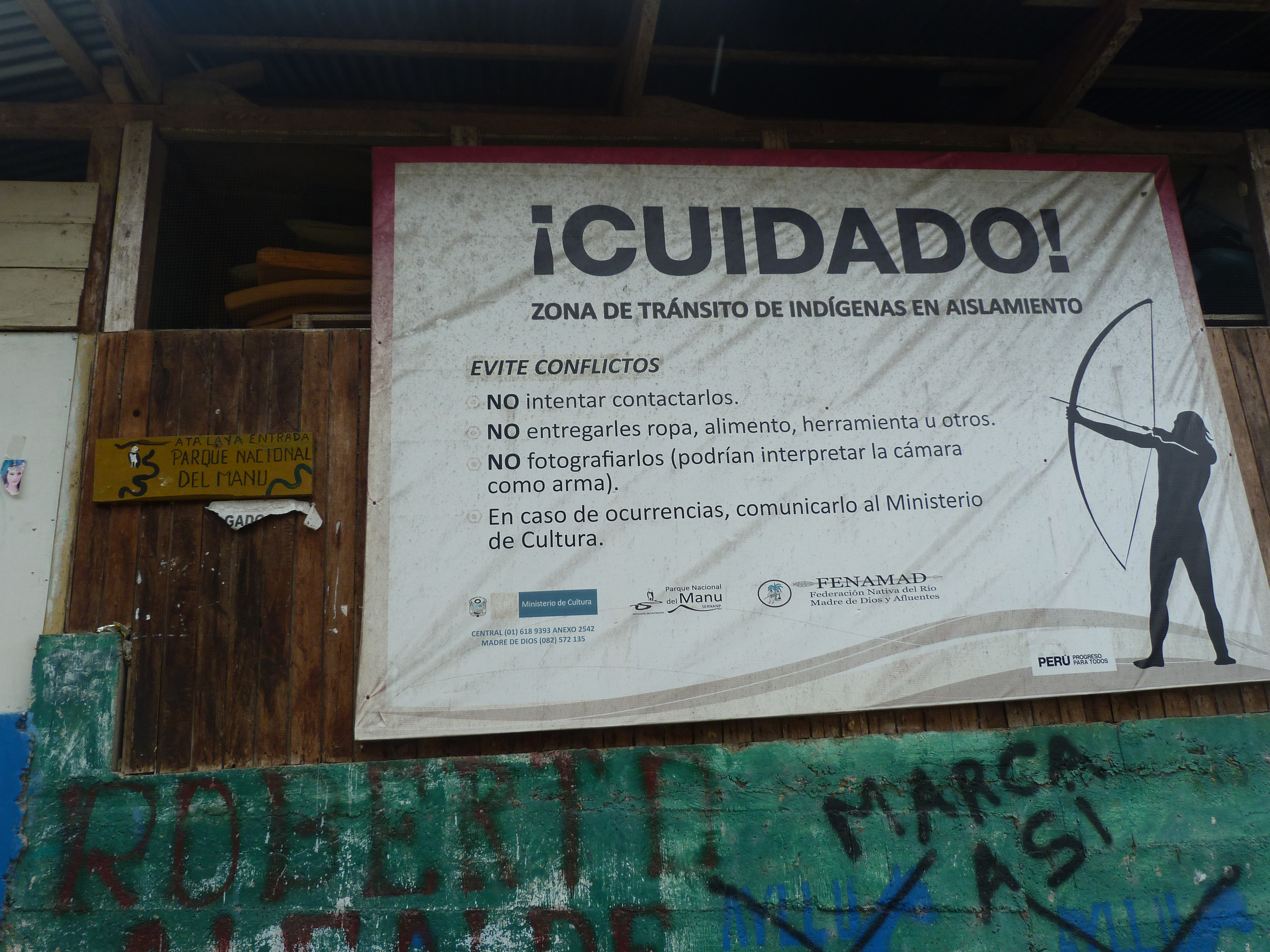
Warning against entering the territory of uncontacted people in Peru

It was those threats, combined with attacks on their tribe by illegal cocaine traffickers, that led a group of Acre Indians to make contact with a village in Brazil and subsequently with the federal government in 2014. This behaviour suggests that many tribes are aware of the outside world and choose not to make contact unless motivated by fear or self-interest. Satellite images suggest that some tribes intentionally migrate away from roads or logging operations to remain secluded.

Indigenous rights activists have often advocated that Indigenous peoples in isolation be left alone as contact will interfere with their right to self-determination as peoples. On the other hand, experience in Brazil suggests isolating peoples might want to have trading relationships and positive social connections with others, but choose isolation out of fear of conflict or exploitation. The Brazilian state organization FUNAI in collaboration with anthropological experts has chosen to make controlled initial contact with tribes. The organization operates 15 trading posts throughout protected territory where tribes can trade for metal tools and cooking instruments. The organization also steps in to prevent some conflicts and deliver vaccinations. FUNAI has been critical of political will in Brazil, reporting that it only received 15% of its requested budget in 2017. In 2018, after consensus among field agents, FUNAI released videos and images of several tribes under their protection. Although the decision was criticized, the director of the Isolated Indian department, Bruno Pereira, responded that "The more the public knows and the more debate around the issue, the greater the chance of protecting isolated Indians and their lands". He shared that the organization has been facing mounting political pressure to open up lands to commercial companies. He also justified the photography by explaining that FUNAI was investigating a possible mass homicide incident against the Flecheiros tribe.

Recognizing the myriad problems with contact, the United Nations Human Rights Council in 2009 and the Inter-American Commission on Human Rights in 2013 introduced guidelines and recommendations that included a right to choose self-isolation.

Human safaris in India's Andaman Islands and in the Peruvian Amazon—where tourism companies attempt to help tourists see uncontacted or recently contacted peoples—are controversial.

In the 2010s and 2020s, influencers have become an increasing problem for uncontacted peoples. According to Survival International, a number of YouTubers have attempted to contact uncontacted people for content. This includes the Ayoreo people of Paraguay, which one YouTuber attempted to contact on multiple occasions. John Allen Chau, a missionary killed on North Sentinel Island, detailed his trip to the island on Instagram. He also had a brand deal attached to his journey. Paul Rosolie, a conservationist and content creator, posted rare footage he had taken of the Mashco Piro as a means of promoting a book he released shortly after. One YouTuber, Mykhailo Polyakov, was arrested after visiting North Sentinel Island, during which no contact was made.

== By region ==
=== India ===
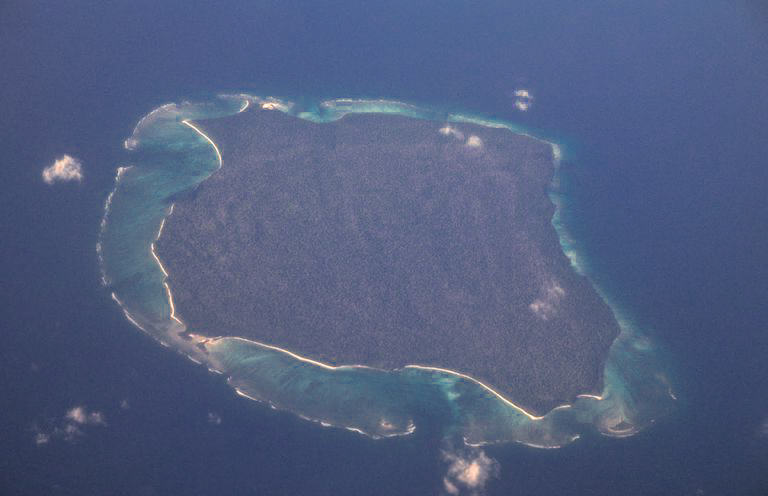
Aerial photograph of North Sentinel Island

==== Sentinelese ====
The Sentinelese people of North Sentinel Island, which lies near South Andaman Island in the Bay of Bengal, reject contact. Attempts to contact them have usually been rebuffed, sometimes with lethal force. Their language is markedly different from other languages of the Andamans, which suggests that they have been isolated for thousands of years. They have been called by experts the most isolated people in the world, and they are likely to remain so.

Indian visits to the island ceased in 1997. An American, John Allen Chau, was killed in 2018 while visiting the island illegally as a Christian missionary. On March 29, 2025, a US citizen from Arizona made an unauthorised landing on the island, leaving behind a can of Diet Coke and a coconut as a peace offering. He was subsequently arrested by the Indian Police Service with a view to prosecution. Indigenous rights NGO Survival International, which advocates for uncontacted peoples globally, condemned the illegal actions as "deeply disturbing", noting that uncontacted peoples like the Sentinelese are vulnerable to being wiped out by contact-induced diseases to which they have no immunity.

==== Shompen ====
The Shompen or Shom Pen people are the Indigenous people of the interior of Great Nicobar Island, part of the Indian union territory of Andaman and Nicobar Islands. In 2001, the population was estimated at approximately 300. They practice a hunter-gatherer subsistence economy. Survival International says that the Shompen are one of the most isolated peoples on earth, with most of them being uncontacted and refusing interactions with outsiders.

Due to the proposed Great Nicobar Development Plan, hectares of land on Great Nicobar Island will be reclaimed to build a "Hong Kong India" with an airport, an international port, and an industrial park. This may impact 1,700 people, including many Shompens. In February 2024, 39 genocide experts from 13 countries warned that the development "will be a death sentence for the Shompen, tantamount to the international crime of genocide". They said that the proposed population increase and exposure to outside populations would lead to mass deaths, because the Shompen have little to no immunity to infectious outside diseases. This is still being fought in courts.

=== South America ===
==== Bolivia ====
There are 13 groups of isolated peoples living in Bolivia, three of which live on land with legal protections recognized by the national government. The Toromona are an uncontacted people living near the upper Madidi River and the Heath Rivers in northwestern Bolivia. The government has created an "exclusive, reserved, and inviolable" portion of the Madidi National Park to protect the Toromona.

Among the Ayoreo people of the Gran Chaco are a small number of uncontacted nomadic hunter-gatherers in the Kaa-Iya del Gran Chaco National Park and Integrated Management Natural Area.

Pacahuaras are believed to be living in voluntary isolation in Pando Department.

==== Brazil ====
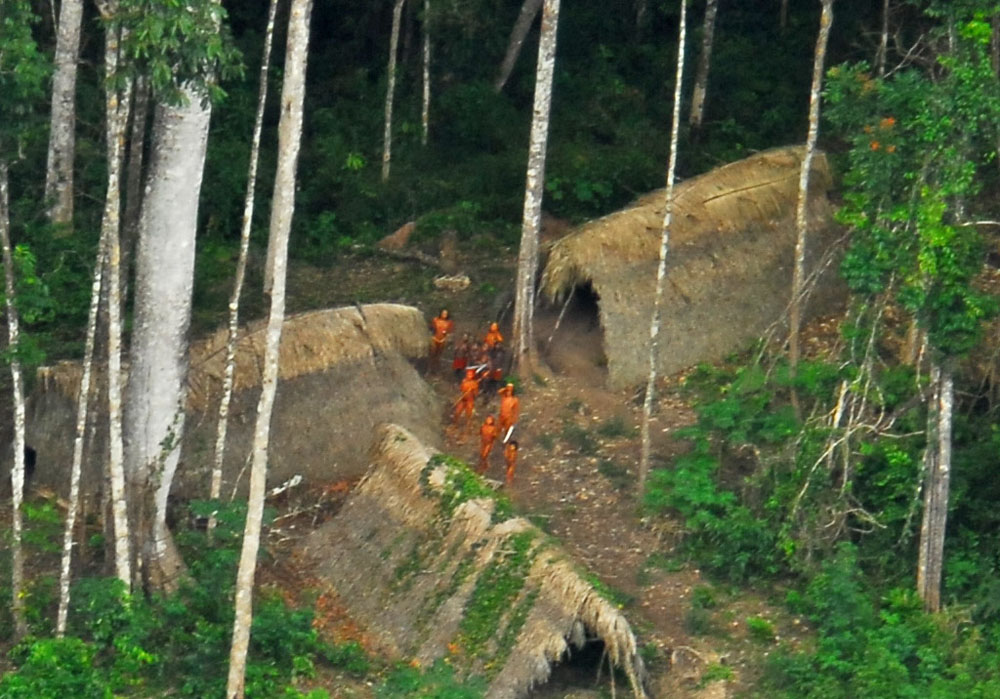
Members of an uncontacted tribe in Acre, Brazil, in 2009

According to Survival Intentional, in 2025 there are 124 groups of isolated peoples living in Brazil, 88 of which live on land recognized by the government. In 2007, FUNAI reported the presence of 67 uncontacted Indigenous peoples in Brazil, up from 40 in 2005.

Until the 1970s, Brazil attempted unsuccessfully to move anyone on lands that could be commercially cultivated. In 1987, it set up the Department of Isolated Indians inside FUNAI, facilitating the work of Sydney Possuelo and José Carlos Meirelles, and declared the large Vale do Javari Indigenous Territory in western Amazonas perpetually sealed off, encompassing an area of 85,444 square kilometres (32,990 mi^{2}). Since 2021, uncontacted peoples in Brazil have been increasingly threatened by illegal land grabbers, loggers, and gold miners. Additionally, the government of Jair Bolsonaro signalled its intention to develop the Amazon and reduce the size of Indigenous reservations.

The Awá live in Maranhão. There are approximately 350 members, of which roughly 100 have no contact with the outside world. Their tribe is at severe risk because of violent conflicts with loggers in their territory.

The Kawahiva live in the north of Mato Grosso. They are constantly on the move and have little contact with outsiders. Thus, they are known primarily from physical evidence they have left behind: arrows, baskets, hammocks, and communal houses. In 2016 their population was estimated at 15 individuals, and in 2024 at 35-40. In 2013, the government released video of the Kawahiva filmed in 2011, generating headlines around the world. In 2024, after years of campaigning, Brazil’s Supreme Court ordered FUNAI to present a timetable for demarcation of the Kawahiva do Rio Pardo territory, and in March 2025 FUNAI confirmed their intention to complete it by the end of 2025.

The Korubu (also known as Korubo, the endonym Dslala, and in Portuguese as caceteiros, "clubbers"), the Flecheiros ("arrow people"), and the Tsohom Djapa ("toucan people") are uncontacted peoples living in the Vale do Javari Indigenous Territory in western Amazonas.

The Himarimã are a largely uncontacted people that live along the Pinhuã River, between the Juruá and Purus Rivers, in central Amazonas. Their numbers are uncertain, but in 1943 it was estimated that they consisted of more than 1000 individuals.

In the Uru-Eu-Uaw-Uaw Indigenous Territory in central Rondônia there are uncontacted peoples belonging to between four and six different groups, including the Jururei, Yvyraparaquara, Parakua, and some bands of the Uru Pa In. The uncontacted population was estimated between 1000 and 1200 in 1986, but it has potentially declined very steeply in the recent decade due to regular attacks by loggers and ranchers.

The Kampa and Envira River Isolated Peoples Indigenous Territory in Acre is inhabited by uncontacted groups from the Ashaninka, Nomole, and Xinane peoples.

Some extremely small isolated groups have also come to the media's attention. Two brothers of the Piripkura people, out of three total surviving members, had continued to live alone in the jungle in Mato Grosso, but initiated contact with FUNAI after a fire they had kept burning for 18 years went out. They were the subsequent focus of the documentary Piripkura. Another man colloquially called the "Man of the Hole" lived alone on 8,000 hectares (20,000 acres) in the Tanaru Indigenous Territory in Rondônia, where he dug hundreds of holes for farming and trapping. He was found dead in his hammock, in a self-made dwelling, in August 2022.

==== Colombia ====
There are 18 groups of isolated peoples living in Colombia, 2 of which live on land recognized by the government.

With the creation of vast tribal reserves and strict patrolling, Colombia is now regarded as one of the countries that offer maximum protection to uncontacted Indigenous people.

The Nukak people are nomadic hunter-gatherers living between the Guaviare and Inírida rivers in south-east Colombia at the headwaters of the northwest Amazon basin. There are groups, including the Yuri (Carabayo) and Passé, in Río Puré National Park.

==== Ecuador ====
There are 3 groups of isolated peoples living in Ecuador, all of which live on land recognized by the government.

Two isolated Indigenous peoples of Ecuador live in the Amazon region: the Tagaeri and the Taromenane. Both are eastern Huaorani peoples living in Yasuni National Park. These semi-nomadic people live in small groups, subsisting on hunting, gathering, and some crops. They are organized into extended families. Since 2007, there has been a national policy which mandates untouchability, self-determination, equality, and no contact. In 2013, more than 20 Taromenane were killed by Waorani, another Huaorani group.

==== Paraguay ====
Approximately 100 Ayoreo people, some of whom are in the Totobiegosode tribe, live uncontacted in the forest. They are nomadic, and they hunt, forage, and conduct limited agriculture. They are the last uncontacted peoples south of the Amazon Basin, and are in Amotocodie. Threats to them include rampant illegal deforestation. According to Survival International, Brazilian company Yaguarete Porá S.A. is converting thousands of hectares of the Ayoreo-Totobiegosode tribe's ancestral territory into cattle ranching land. The Union of Ayoreo Natives of Paraguay is working for their protection, with support from the Iniciativa Amotocodie. In 2021, the Ayoreo appealed to the Inter-American Commission on Human Rights to save their land from destruction.

==== Peru ====
There are 28 groups of isolated peoples living in Peru, 16 of which live on land recognized by the government.

The Nomole (derogatorily called Mashco-Piro) are nomadic Arawak-speaking hunter-gatherers who inhabit Manú National Park in Peru. In 1998, the International Work Group for Indigenous Affairs estimated their number to be around 100 to 250. They speak a dialect of the Piro languages. Amid incursions on their land, the tribe has made it clear they do not wish to be contacted. As of 2013, all the bands seem to be surviving. In July 2024, video and images of dozens of uncontacted Nomole people, on the banks of a river a few kilometers from a series of logging concessions, were published by Survival International. In September 2024, at least two loggers were killed by a group of uncontacted Nomole.

Other groups include the Machiguenga, Nanti, Asháninka, Mayoruna, Isconahua, Kapanawa, Yora, Murunahua, Chitonahua, Mastanahua, Kakataibo, and Pananujuri. Many of them speak Panoan or Arawakan languages. There are five reserves for uncontacted peoples. However, the law designed to protect those peoples does not prevent economic operations there. There are about 25 uncontacted indigenous groups in Peru.

==== Venezuela ====
There are 4 groups of isolated peoples living in Venezuela.

In Venezuela, some groups from the Hoti, Yanomami, and Piaroa tribes live in relative isolation. The Ministry of Indigenous Peoples has no policies designed to protect these people specifically.

=== Indonesia ===
There are 4 groups of isolated peoples living in Indonesia outside of Western New Guinea.

==== Java ====
Banten is home to the Baduy or Kanekes which are divided into the Tangtu (Inner Baduy), Panamping (Outer Baduy), and Dangka. Inner Baduy shun all contacts with outsiders, while Outer Baduy do foster some limited contacts with the outside world. Dangka are the outermost Baduy groups which do not live in the Kanekes region and have sustained contact with the outside world.

==== North Maluku ====
The O'Hongana Manyawa (Inner Tobelo or Togutil) are a semi-nomadic ethnic group living in the interior of Halmahera Island. In October 2023, footage emerged of members of the group warning logging companies to stay away from their lands. A 2024 report claimed that their forest was being destroyed by the nickel mining industry.

==== Sulawesi ====
The Polahi are an isolated ethnic group that inhabits the interior forests of Gorontalo. According to stories circulating among the people, the Polahi were ancient fugitive people who withdrew into the forest around the 17th century because they were afraid of the Dutch and did not want to be colonized by them. As a result of this, they are now an isolated ethnic group, living deep in the forests of the Boliyohuto, Paguyaman, and Suwawa.

==== Western New Guinea ====
Two to ten uncontacted tribes live in the West Papua region in Indonesia. While it is difficult for journalists and organizations to enter West Papua, no government agency is dedicated to protecting isolated Indigenous groups. Human rights organizations, including Survival International, have argued that there is a need to raise awareness of the existence of uncontacted tribes, for example, to prevent the development of infrastructure near their lands. On the other hand, remaining vague about the exact location and size of the tribe may help to avoid encouraging contact.

== Historical ==
=== Australia ===
The Pintupi Nine are some of the last Aboriginal people to live uncontacted in Australia, not coming into contact with the wider population of the country until 1984 when they came into Kiwirrkurra, a community near where they lived in the Gibson Desert. They are part of the Pintupi people. As of 2025, four members of the Pintupi Nine are still alive.

Although the Pintupi Nine are often thought of as the last uncontacted Aboriginal people in Australia, the seven members of the Richter family were uncontacted until two years later in 1986, when fellow Aṉangu people led an expedition to reunite with the family. As of 2023, two members of the family continue to live in Tjuntjuntjara, the community they first entered after establishing contact.

=== New Guinea ===
The New Guinea Highlands were first visited by Western explorers in the 1930s. The highland valleys were found to be inhabited by over a million people.

=== Peru ===
The Matsés made their first permanent contact with the outside world in 1969. Before that date, they were effectively at war with the Peruvian government.

== See also ==
- Isolationism
- List of contemporary ethnic groups
- Man of the Hole
- Noble savage
- Stateless society
- Terra nullius
