= Encyclopedia of Indigenous Peoples in Brazil =

- Website type: Online encyclopedia
- Available in: English, Spanish, Portuguese
- Owner: Instituto Socioambiental
- Website: pib.socioambiental.org/en
- Commercial: No
- Launched: 1998; 28 years ago

The Encyclopedia of Indigenous Peoples in Brazil is a specialized encyclopedia about the Indigenous peoples in Brazil, published online since 1998 by the Instituto Socioambiental (ISA). It presents over 200 articles with ethnographic information about Indigenous peoples in Brazil, as well as analyses, news and other Indigenous-related material.

In 2013 it was awarded with the Rodrigo de Melo Franco Prize, by the Brazilian National Institute of Historic and Artistic Heritage, for its services in communicating Indigenous cultures and heritage.
