= Sydney Possuelo =

Brazilian explorer, social activist and ethnographer (born 1940)

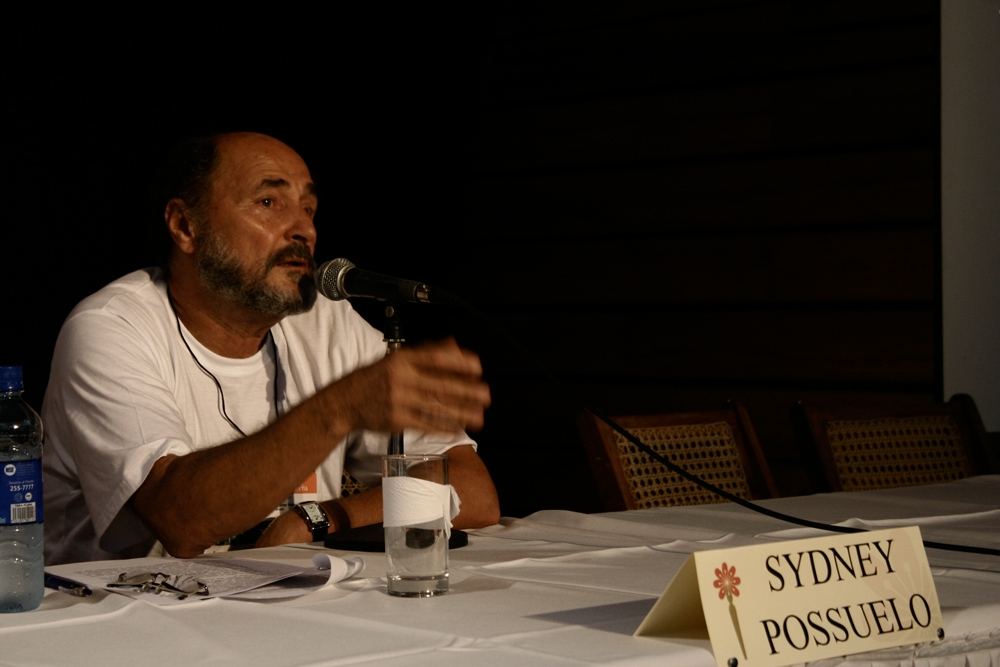
Sydney Possuelo in 2007.

Sydney Ferreira Possuelo (born 19 April 1940, in Santos Dumont) is a Brazilian explorer, social activist and ethnographer who is considered the leading authority on Brazil's remaining isolated Indigenous Peoples.

== Life and career ==
Sydney Possuelo started his career assisting the Villas Boas brothers with their work among indigenous peoples of the Xingu River area.

In the late 1980s, he was instrumental for peacebuilding efforts undertaken on behalf of the Fundação Nacional dos Povos Indígenas (Portuguese for 'National Foundation of the Indigenous Peoples'; FUNAI) after conflict erupted between the Arara people and construction crews working on the Trans-Amazonian Highway. The Arara fell victim to Eurasian diseases and lack of coordination between white and Arara meant that, despite FUNAI's preparation for such eventuality, the resulting epidemic caused significant demographic upset. Lack of support for the consequences of contact and socioeconomic marginalization of the recently assimilated Arara had devastating consequences for their wellbeing, which disillusioned Possuelo with the existing policy of assimilation and acculturation of previously uncontacted tribes.

With support from like-minded FUNAI officials, particularly Gilberto Pinto Figueiredo, Possuelo successfully advocated for the creation of the Department of Indigenous in Isolation (Departamento de Indios Isolados) within FUNAI and became its first director in 1987.

The Department of Indigenous in Isolation doubled the surface size of officially designated Indigenous land in Brazil over the next two years.

Working in the most isolated areas in the Amazon region, Possuelo has led many expeditions, getting in contact with or learning about isolated tribes in Brazil, with the aim to protect them from outsiders. He was responsible, among others, for the restoration of peaceful relations with the Korubo people, who had previously killed some FUNAI officials, including Possuelo's close friend Raimundo (Sobral) Batista Magalhães.

On January 24, 2006, Possuelo was dismissed as director of the Department of Unknown Tribes within FUNAI. Days earlier, he had criticized FUNAI director Mercio Pereira Gomes for suggesting that Brazilian Indians held too much land, comparing Gomes to "ranchers, land-grabbers, miners, and loggers."

Possuelo continued his efforts at defending isolated tribes through the non-governmental Instituto Indigenista Interamericano ('Interamerican Indigenous Institute').

== Activism ==
In a 2022 interview, Possuelo criticized then-president Jair Bolsonaro's approach to indigenous conservation, blaming his administration for an increase in illegal invasions of indigenous lands. In the interview, Possuelo stated that "Indigenous people have never faced a worst moment in Brazilian history than the one they are now facing" under Bolsonaro, who he accused of "giv[ing] cover to criminals and trespassers". In the run-up to the 2022 Brazilian general election, Possuelo stated that he had issues with aspects of Luiz Inácio Lula da Silva's past, but expected him to improve the conditions of indigenous Brazilians if elected.

== Recognition ==
For his many efforts Sydney has received many prizes, including honors from the National Geographic Society, Bartolomeu de las Casas in 1998, a gold medal from the Royal Geographical Society, the title of "Hero of the Planet" by Time Kids Magazine, as well as "Hero of the year" 2001 by United Nations.

In his 60 years of work, Brazilian-born Possuelo has made contact with seven tribes that had never previously been exposed to white people, was responsible for demarcating about 15 percent of Brazil’s territory as protected reserves for the indigenous communities, and afterward adopted an opposite – and revolutionary – policy of avoiding contact with those peoples, in order to protect them. With machete in hand and without an academic degree, he became an ethnographer and spent years in the jungles in the company of the native peoples.
For years Possuelo worked for and headed the Department for Isolated Indians in FUNAI, Brazil’s National Indian Bureau. His efforts have made him the foremost authority in the field, a spokesman for the indigenous tribes of the Amazon region and one of the most admired and decorated activists in the world. Without him, dozens of tribes would have become extinct.

Possuelo is the main protagonist in the book The Unconquered: In Search of the Amazon's Last Uncontacted Tribes (2011) by National Geographic writer Scott Wallace. It details a 76-day expedition in 2002 led by Possuelo to find the status of the "Arrow People", an uncontacted tribe in the Vale do Javari Indigenous Land.
