= Jururei =

Jururei is a tiny uncontacted Indian tribe numbering 8–10 people living in the Pacaás Novos National Park inside the Uru-Eu-Uaw-Uaw Indigenous Territory in Rondônia State, Brazil. In 2005, their land was invaded by loggers who tried to wipe them out. It is not known how many of the tribespeople were killed in the conflict that followed. When FUNAI officials visited their only village, it was abandoned and huts were destroyed.
