= Indigenous peoples in Brazil =

Native Brazilians
Brasileiros nativos (Portuguese)
- Proportion of Native Brazilians in each municipality as of the 2022 Brazilian census

Total population
- Amerindian ancestry predominates ▲1,227,642 (2022 census) ▲0.60% of the Brazilian population

Regions with significant populations
- Predominantly in the North and Central-West

Languages
- Indigenous languages, Portuguese

Religion
- Indigenous religion, animism. 61.1% Roman Catholic, 19.9% Protestant, 11% non-religious, 8% other beliefs.

Related ethnic groups
- Other Indigenous peoples of the Americas

Indigenous peoples in Brazil or Native Brazilians (Portuguese: Brasileiros nativos) are the peoples whose ancestors lived in Brazil before European contact around 1500 and those pre-Columbian forebears. Indigenous peoples once comprised an estimated 2,000 distinct tribes and nations inhabiting what is now Brazil. The 2010 Brazil census recorded 305 Indigenous ethnic groups.

Historically, many Indigenous peoples of Brazil were semi-nomadic and combined hunting, fishing, and gathering with migratory agriculture. Many tribes were massacred by European settlers, and others assimilated into the growing Brazilian population.

The Indigenous population was decimated by European diseases, declining from a pre-Columbian high of 2 million to 3 million to approximately 300,000 by 1997, distributed among 200 tribes. According to the 2022 IBGE census, 1,694,836 Brazilians classified themselves as Indigenous, divided into 391 ethnic groups and the census recorded 295 Indigenous languages. Almost 77% of Indigenous Brazilians speak Portuguese.

On 18 January 2007, Fundação Nacional do Índio reported 67 remaining uncontacted tribes in Brazil, up from 40 known in 2005. With this increase, Brazil surpassed New Guinea, becoming the country with the largest number of uncontacted peoples in the world.

== History ==
=== Origins ===
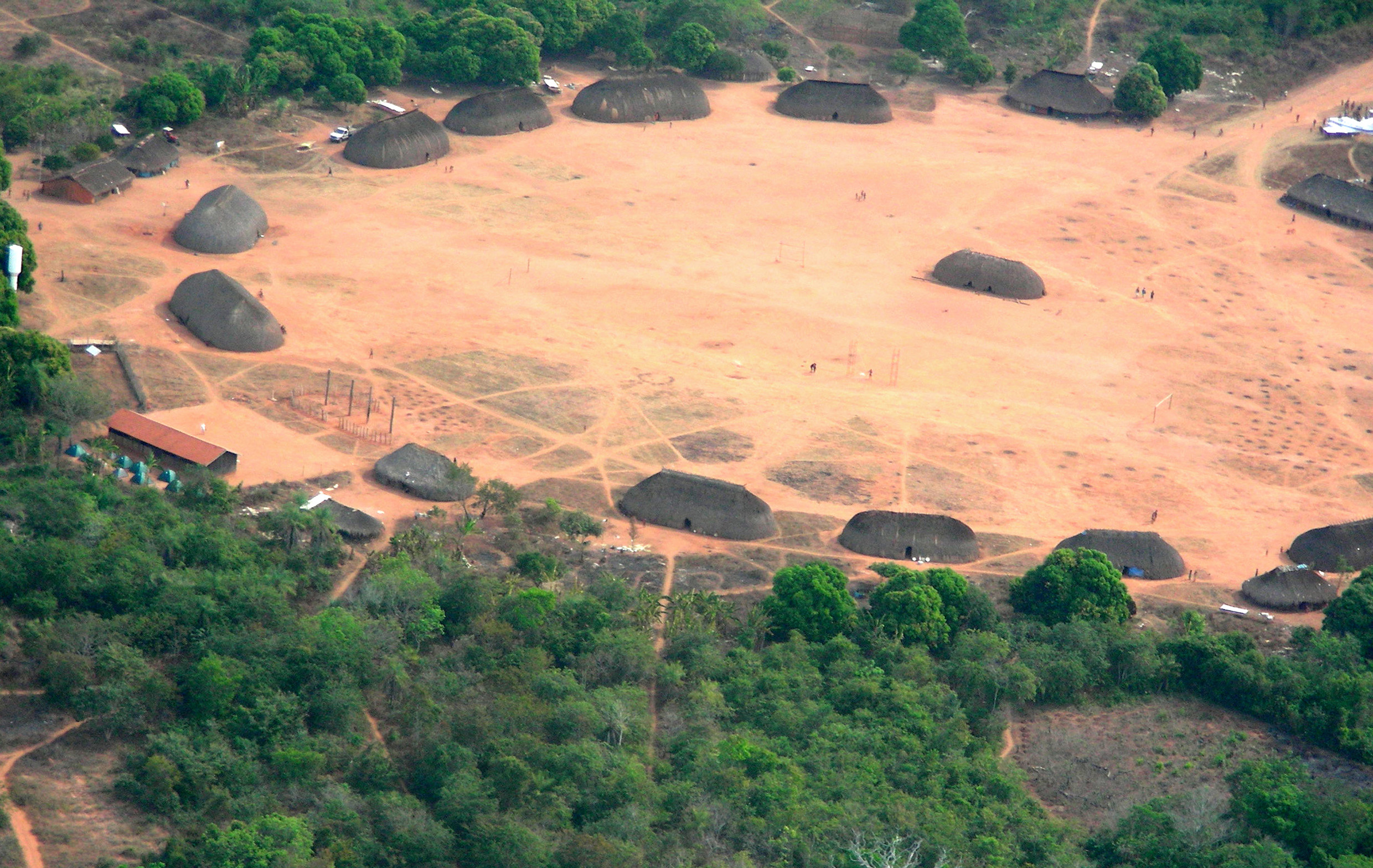
Xingu, an Indigenous territory of Brazil

Questions about the original settlement of the Americas have led to various hypothetical models. The origins of these Indigenous peoples remain a matter of debate among archaeologists.

==== Migration into the continents ====
In Brazil, most Native tribes living in the land by 1500 are thought to be descended from the first wave of Siberian migrants to the Americas, who are believed to have crossed the Bering Land Bridge at the end of the last Ice Age, between 13,000 and 17,000 years ago.

==== Genetic studies ====
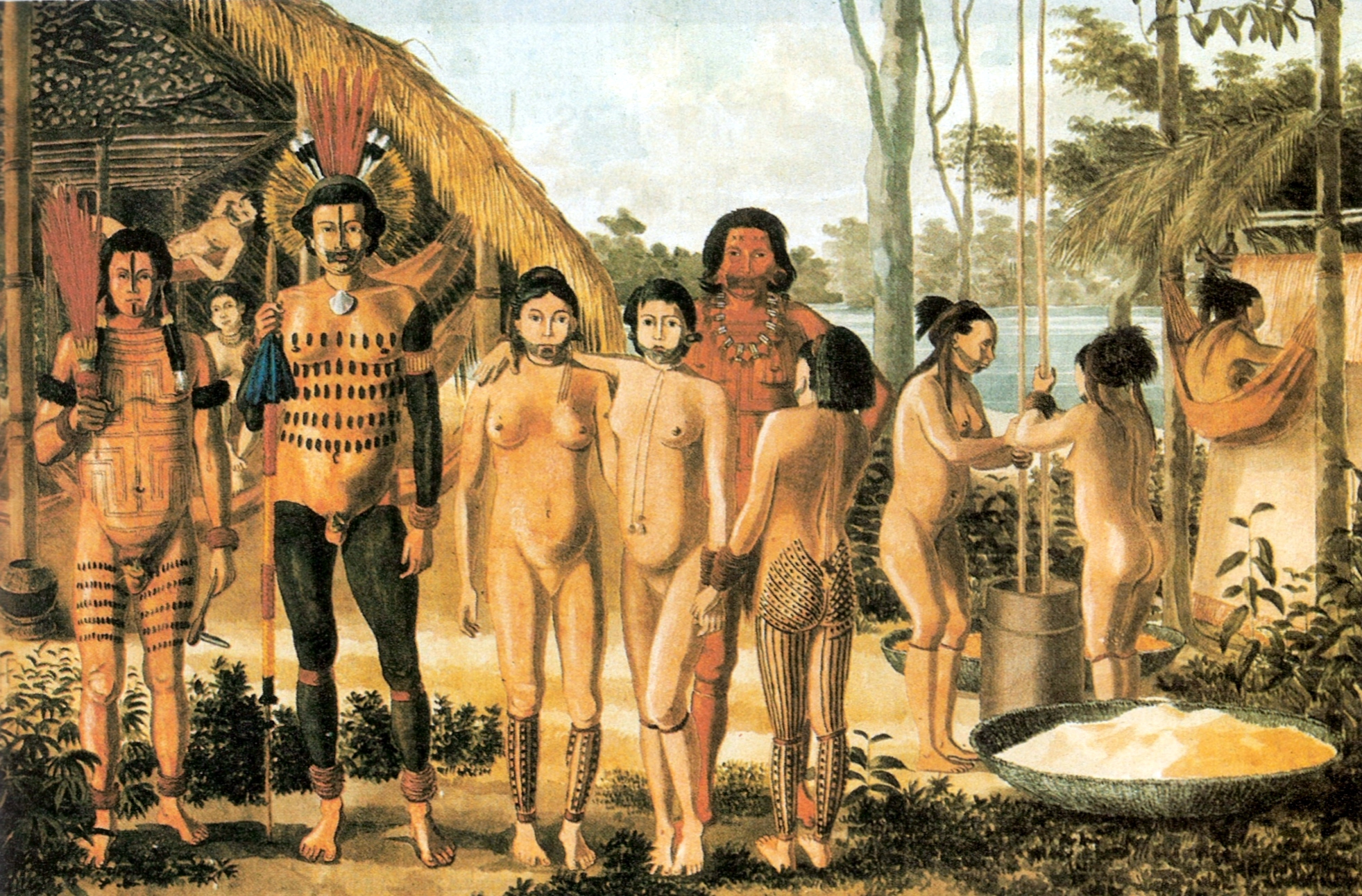
Apiacá people, painted by Hércules Florence, 1827

===== Y-chromosome DNA =====
An analysis of Amerindian Y-chromosome DNA reveals specific clustering within much of the South American population. The micro-satellite diversity and distributions of Y-chromosome lineages specific to South America suggest that certain Amerindian populations have been isolated since the initial colonization of the region.

===== Autosomal DNA =====
According to a 2012 autosomal DNA genetic study, Indigenous peoples of the Americas descend from at least three main migrant waves from Siberia. Most of their ancestry traces back to a single ancestral population, referred to as the 'First Americans'. However, Inuit-speaking populations from the Arctic inherited nearly half of their ancestry from a second Siberian migrant wave, while Na-dene speakers inherited about one-tenth of their ancestry from a third migrant wave. The initial settlement of the Americas was followed by a rapid expansion southward along the coast, with limited gene flow later, especially in South America. An exception to this is the Chibcha speakers, whose ancestry includes contributions from both North and South America.

===== mtDNA =====
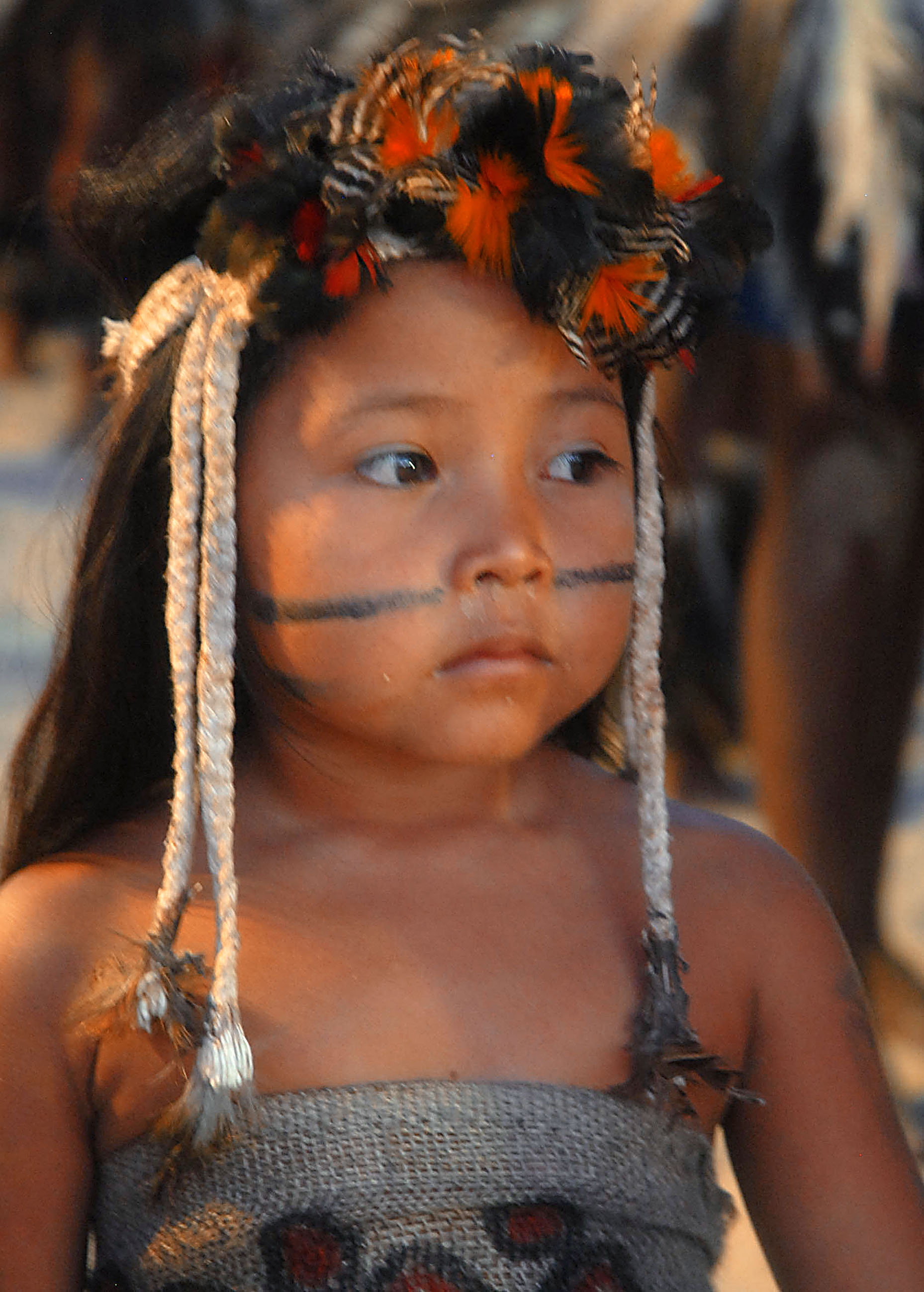
Terena girl at the closing ceremony of the Indigenous Peoples Games

Another study, focused on mitochondrial DNA (mtDNA), which is inherited only through the maternal line, revealed that the maternal ancestry of the Indigenous peoples of the Americas traces back to a few founding lineages from Siberia, likely arriving via the Bering Strait. According to this study, the ancestors of Indigenous peoples of the Americas likely remained near the Bering Strait for a time before rapidly spreading throughout the Americas and eventually reaching South America. A 2016 study on mtDNA lineages found that "a small population entered the Americas via a coastal route around 16,000 years ago, following a period of isolation in eastern Beringia for approximately 2,400 to 9,000 years after separating from eastern Siberian populations. After spreading rapidly throughout the Americas, limited gene flow in South America resulted in a distinct phylogeographic structure of populations, which persisted over time. All ancient mitochondrial lineages detected in this study were absent from modern data sets, suggesting a high extinction rate. To investigate this further, we applied a novel principal components multiple logistic regression test to Bayesian serial coalescent simulations. The analysis supported a scenario in which European colonization caused a substantial loss of pre-Columbian lineages."

===== The Oceanic component in the Amazon region =====
Two 2015 autosomal DNA genetic studies confirmed the Siberian origins of the Native peoples of the Americas. However, an ancient signal of shared ancestry with the Indigenous peoples of Australia and Melanesia was detected among the Native populations of the Amazon region. This migration from Siberia is estimated to have occurred around 23,000 years ago.

==== Archaeological remains ====
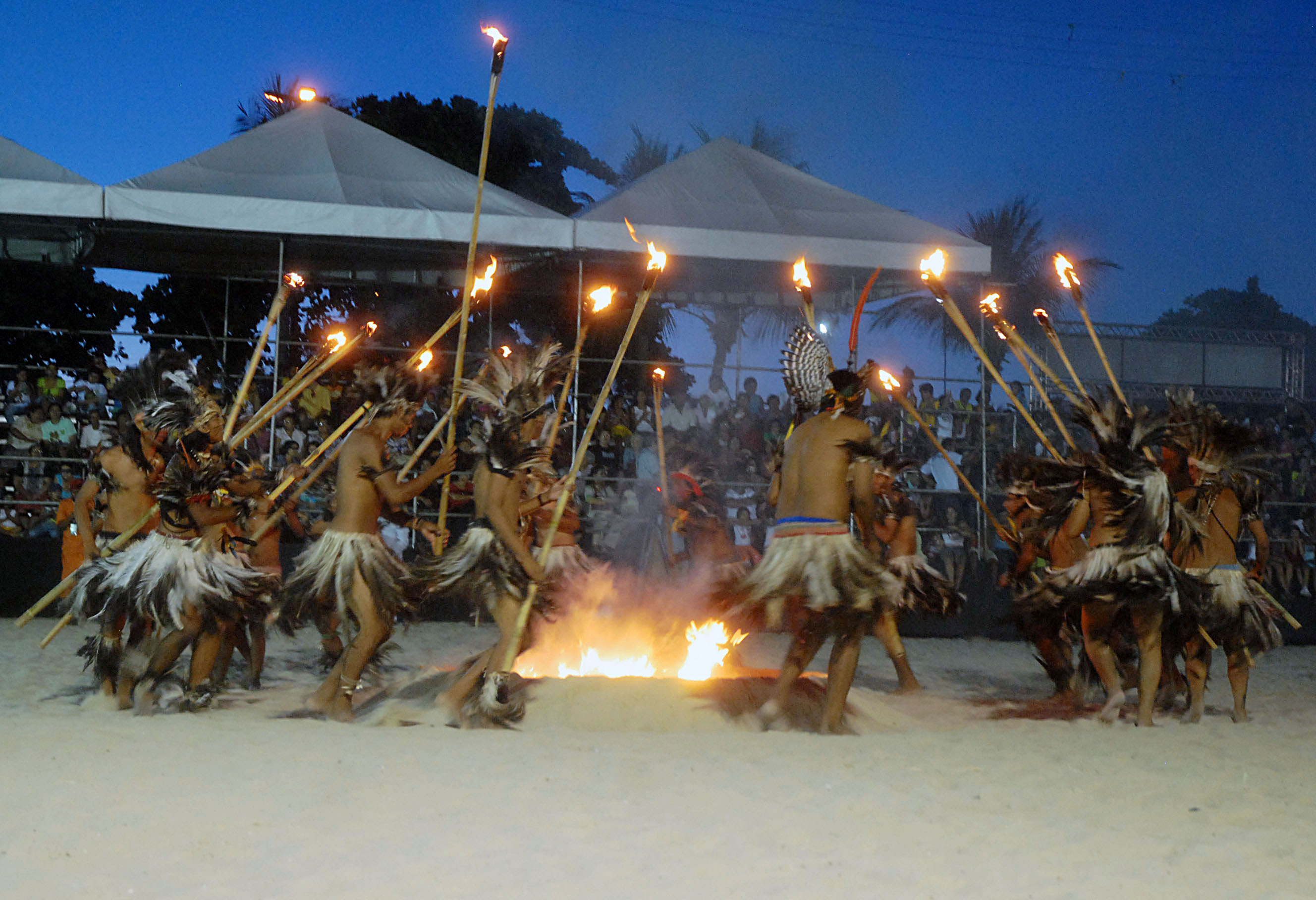
Terena people

Indigenous peoples of Brazil, unlike those in Mesoamerica or the Andes, did not keep written records or erect stone monuments. The humid climate and acidic soil have destroyed almost all traces of their material culture, including wood and bones. Therefore, what is known about the region's history before 1500 has been inferred and reconstructed from limited archaeological evidence, such as ceramics and stone arrowheads.

The most conspicuous remains of these societies are vast mounds of discarded shellfish, known as sambaquis, found at some coastal sites that were continuously inhabited for more than 5,000 years. Additionally, substantial "black earth" (terra preta) deposits in several places along the Amazon are believed to be ancient garbage dumps (middens). Recent excavations of these deposits in the middle and upper Amazon have uncovered remains of massive settlements, containing tens of thousands of homes, indicating a complex social and economic structure.

Studies of the wear patterns of precontact inhabitants of coastal Brazil found that the surfaces of anterior teeth facing the tongue were more worn than those facing the lips. Researchers believe this wear was caused by using teeth to peel and shred abrasive plants.

==== Marajoara culture ====
Marajoara culture

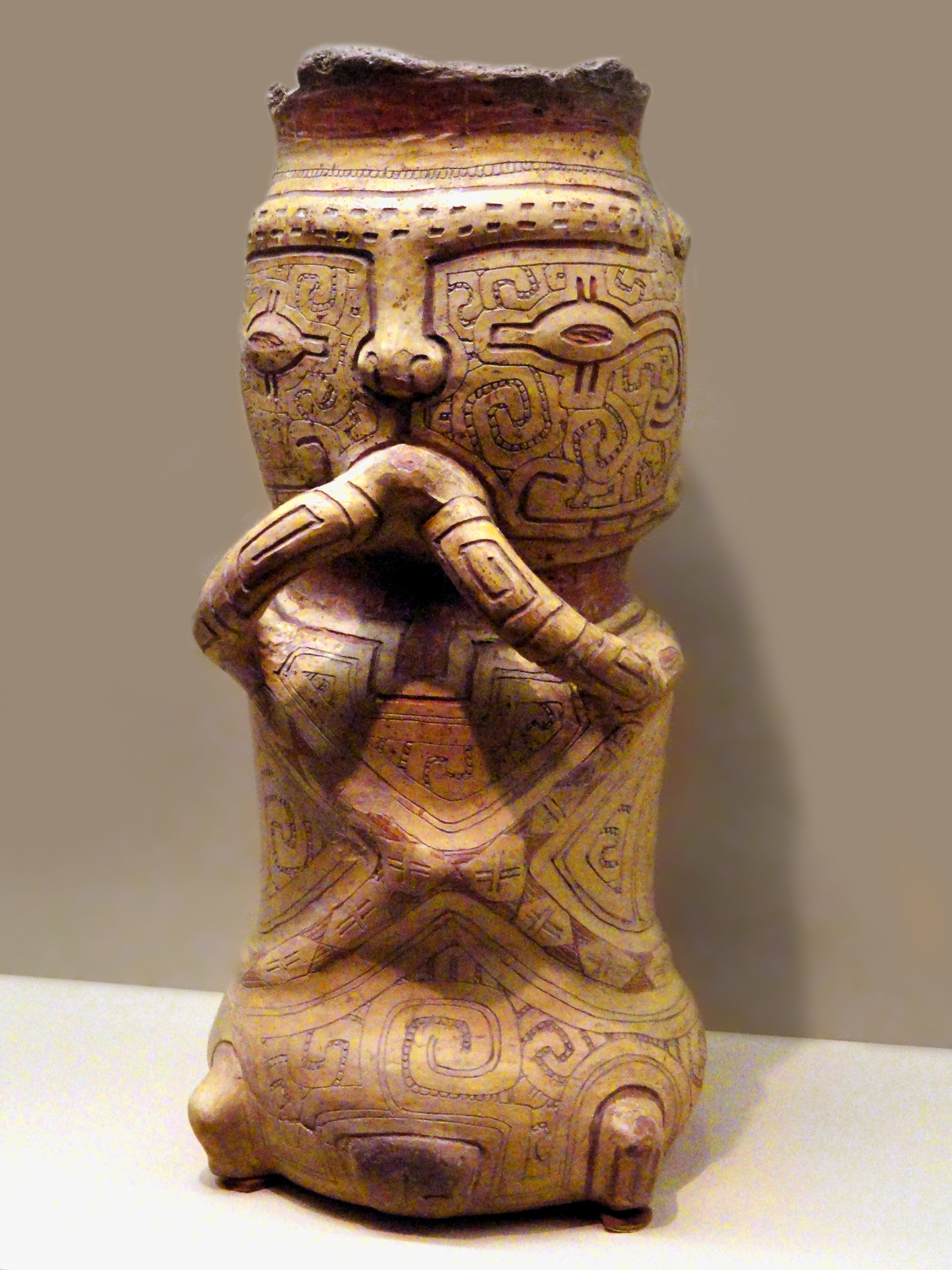
Burial urn

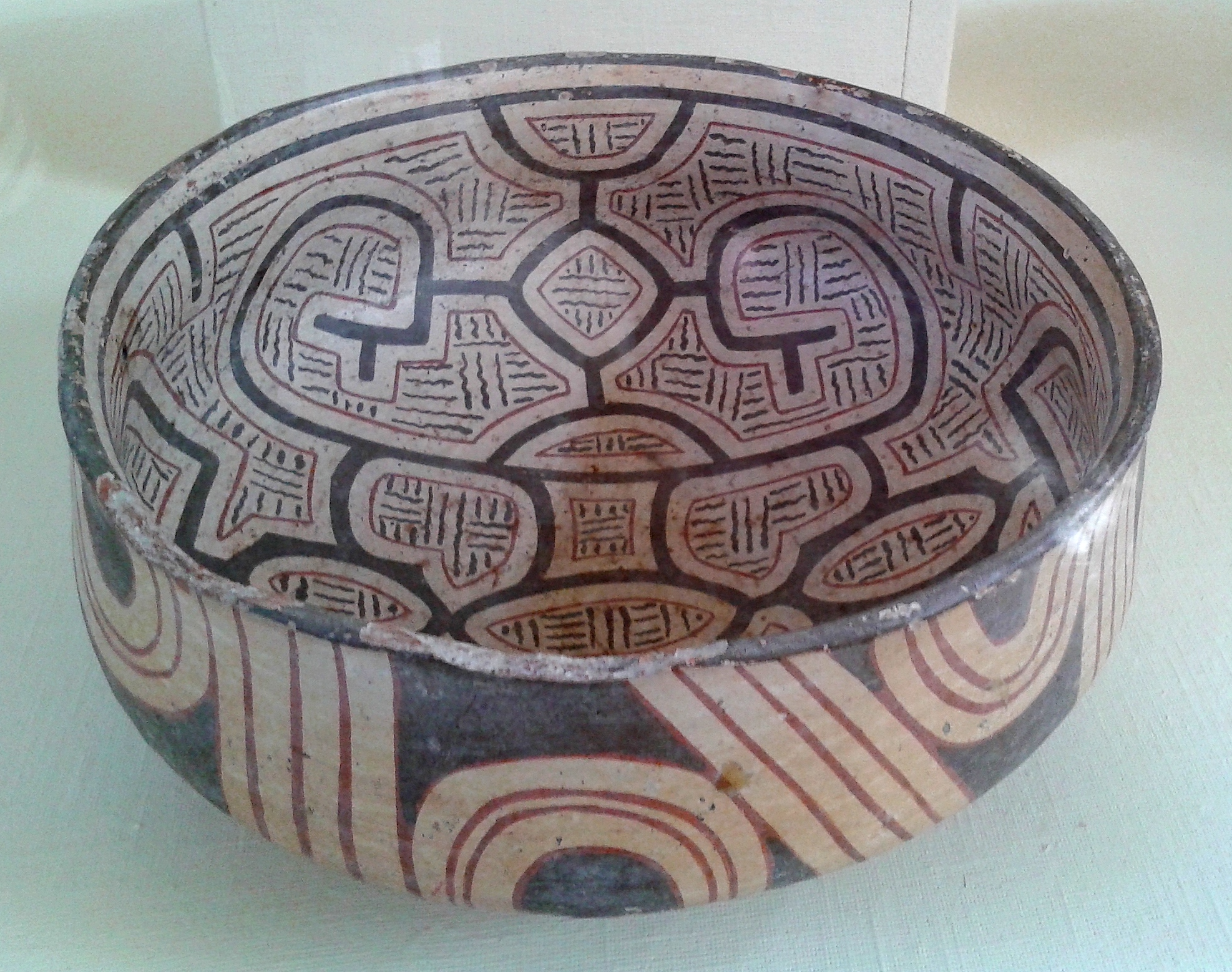
Marajoara bowl

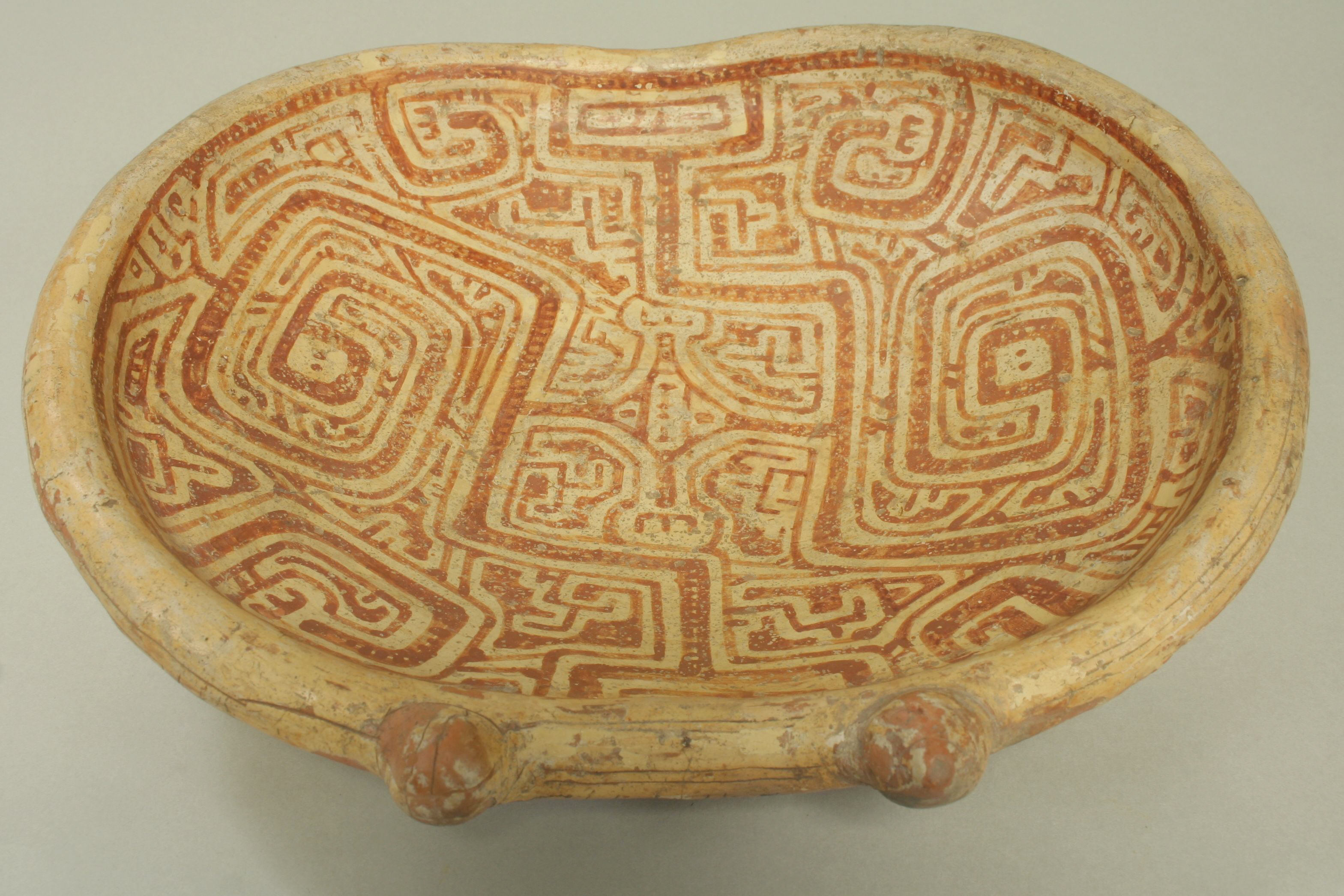
Marajoara plate

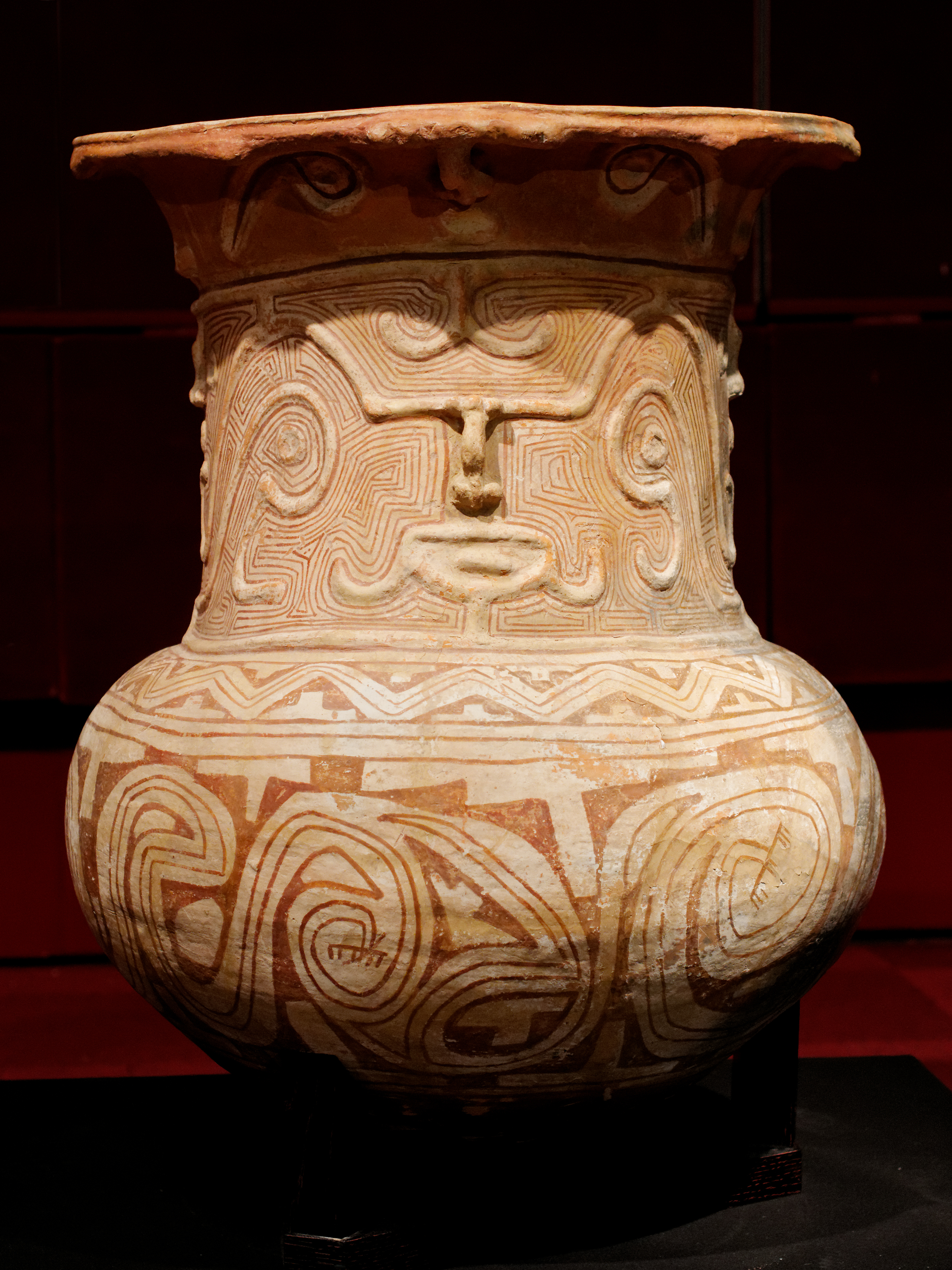
Funerary urn

The Marajoara culture flourished on Marajó island at the mouth of the Amazon River. Archaeologists have uncovered sophisticated pottery in their excavations on the island. These pieces are large, elaborately painted, and incised with representations of plants and animals. This discovery provided the first evidence of a complex society on Marajó. Further evidence of mound building suggests that well-populated, complex, and sophisticated settlements developed on the island, as only such settlements were believed capable of undertaking extensive projects like major earthworks.

The extent, level of complexity, and resource interactions of the Marajoara culture have been subjects of dispute. In the 1950s, American archaeologist Betty Meggers, in some of her earliest research, suggested that the society migrated from the Andes and settled on the island. Many researchers believed that the Andes were populated by Paleoindian migrants from North America, who gradually moved south after being hunters on the plains.

In the 1980s, American archaeologist Anna Curtenius Roosevelt led excavations and geophysical surveys of the mound Teso dos Bichos. She concluded that the society that constructed the mounds originated on the island itself.

The pre-Columbian culture of Marajó may have developed social stratification and supported a population as large as 100,000 people. The Indigenous peoples of the Amazon rainforest may have used their method of developing and working in terra preta to make the land suitable for the large-scale agriculture to support large populations and complex social formations.

==== Xinguano civilisation ====
The Xingu peoples built large settlements connected by roads and bridges, often featuring moats. Their development peaked between 13th and 17th century, with their population reaching into the tens of thousands.

=== Native people after the European colonisation ===
==== Distribution ====
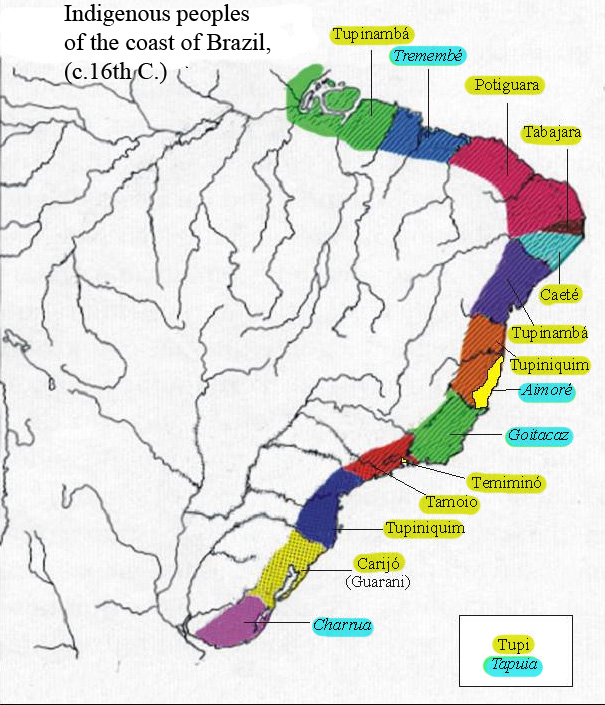
Distribution of Tupi and Tapuia people on the coast of Brazil, on the eve of colonialism in the 16th century

On the eve of the Portuguese arrival in 1500, the coastal areas of Brazil were dominated by two major groups: the Tupi (speakers of Tupi–Guarani languages), who occupied almost the entire length of the Brazilian coast, and the Tapuia (a general term for non-Tupi groups, usually Jê-speaking peoples), who primarily resided in the interior. The Portuguese arrived at the end of a long pre-colonial conflict between the Tupis and Tapuias, which had led to the defeat and expulsion of the Tapuias from most coastal areas.

Although the coastal Tupi were divided into sub-tribes that were frequently hostile to each other, they were culturally and linguistically homogeneous. The fact that early Europeans encountered essentially the same people and language along the Brazilian coast greatly facilitated communication and interaction.

Coastal Sequence c. 1500 (north to south):

1. Tupinambá (Tupi, from the Amazon delta to Maranhão)
2. Tremembé (Tapuia, coastal tribe, ranged from São Luis Island (south Maranhão) to the mouth of the Acaraú River in north Ceará; French traders cultivated an alliance with them)
3. Potiguara (Tupi, literally "shrimp-eaters"; they had a reputation as great canoeists and aggressive expansionists, inhabited a great coastal stretch from Acaraú River to Itamaracá island, covering the modern states of southern Ceará, Rio Grande do Norte and Paraíba.)
4. Tabajara (tiny Tupi tribe between Itamaracá island and Paraíba River; neighbors and frequent victims of the Potiguara)
5. Caeté (Tupi group in Pernambuco and Alagoas, ranged from Paraíba River to the São Francisco River; after killing and eating a Portuguese bishop, they were subjected to Portuguese extermination raids and the remnant pushed into the Pará interior)
6. Tupinambá again (Tupi par excellence, ranged from the São Francisco River to the Bay of All Saints, population estimated as high as 100,000; hosted Portuguese castaway Caramuru)
7. Tupiniquim (Tupi, covered the Bahian discovery coast, from around Camamu to São Mateus River; these were the first Indigenous people encountered by the Portuguese, having met the landing of captain Pedro Álvares Cabral in April 1500)
8. Aimoré (Tapuia (Jê) tribe; concentrated on a sliver of coast in modern Espírito Santo state)
9. Goitacá (Tapuia tribe; once dominated the coast from the São Mateus River (in Espírito Santo state) down to the Paraíba do Sul River (in Rio de Janeiro state); hunter-gatherers and fishermen, they were a shy people that avoided all contact with foreigners; estimated at 12,000; they had a fearsome reputation and were eventually annihilated by European colonists)
10. Temiminó (small Tupi tribe, centered on Governador Island in Guanabara Bay; frequently at war with the Tamoio around them)
11. Tamoio (Tupi, an old branch of the Tupinambá, ranged from the western edge of Guanabara Bay to Ilha Grande)
12. Tupinambá again (Tupi, indistinct from the Tamoio. Inhabited the Paulist coast, from Ilha Grande to Santos; main enemies of the Tupiniquim to their west. Numbered between six and ten thousand).
13. Tupiniquim again (Tupi, on the São Paulo coast from Santos/Bertioga down to Cananéia; aggressive expansionists, they were recent arrivals imposing themselves on the Paulist coast and the Piratininga plateau at the expense of older Tupinambá and Carijó neighbors; hosted Portuguese castaways João Ramalho ('Tamarutaca') and António Rodrigues in the early 1500s; the Tupiniquim were the first formal allies of the Portuguese colonists, helped establish the Portuguese Captaincy of São Vicente in the 1530s; sometimes called "Guaianá" in old Portuguese chronicles, a Tupi term meaning "friendly" or "allied")
14. Carijó (Guarani (Tupi) tribe, ranged from Cananeia all the way down to Lagoa dos Patos (in Rio Grande do Sul state); victims of the Tupiniquim and early European slavers; they hosted the mysterious degredado known as the 'Bachelor of Cananeia')
15. Charrúa (Tapuia (Jê) tribe in modern Uruguay coast, with an aggressive reputation against intruders; killed Juan Díaz de Solís in 1516)

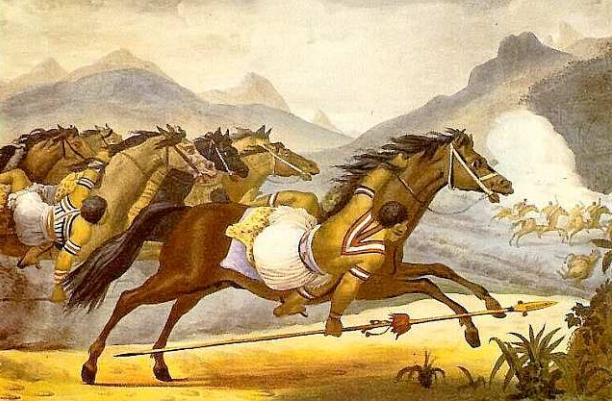
A painting of a Guaycuru cavalry charge, 1822 by Debret

With the exception of the hunter-gatherer Goitacases, the coastal Tupi and Tapuia tribes were primarily agriculturalists. The subtropical Guarani cultivated maize, tropical Tupi cultivated manioc (cassava), and highland Jês cultivated peanuts as the staple of their diet. Supplementary crops included beans, sweet potatoes, cará (yam), jerimum (pumpkin), and cumari (capsicum pepper).

Behind the coasts, the interior of Brazil was primarily dominated by Tapuia (Jê) people, although significant sections of the interior (notably the upper reaches of the Xingu, Teles Pires, and Juruena Rivers, roughly corresponding to modern Mato Grosso state) were the original pre-migration Tupi-Guarani homelands. In addition to the Tupi and Tapuia, two other Indigenous mega-groups were commonly identified in the interior: the Caribs, who inhabited much of what is now northwestern Brazil, including both shores of the Amazon River up to the delta, and the Nuaraque group, whose constituent tribes inhabited several areas, including most of the upper Amazon (west of present-day Manaus) and significant pockets in modern Amapá and Roraima states.

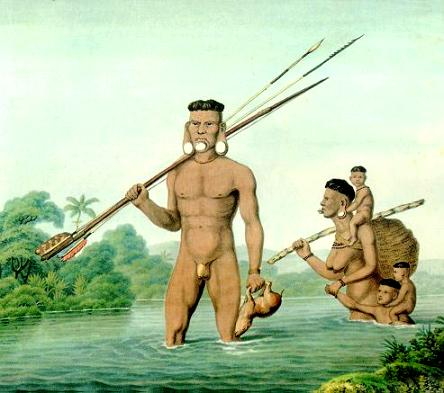
Illustration of Botocudos, c. 1816, by Prince Maximilian

The names by which different Tupi tribes were recorded by Portuguese and French authors in the 16th century are poorly understood. Most do not seem to be proper names but rather descriptions of relationships, usually familial—e.g., Tupi means "first father," Tupinambá means "relatives of the ancestors," Tupiniquim means "side-neighbors," Tamoio means "grandfather," Temiminó means "grandson," Tabajara means "in-laws," and so on. Some etymologists believe these names reflect the ordering of migration waves of Tupi people from the interior to the coasts. For example, the first Tupi wave to reach the coast might have been referred to as "grandfathers" (Tamoio), soon joined by the "relatives of the ancients" (Tupinambá), which could mean relatives of the Tamoio or a Tamoio term for relatives of the old Tupi in the upper Amazon basin. The "grandsons" (Temiminó) might represent a splinter group, while the "side-neighbors" (Tupiniquim) could denote recent arrivals still establishing their presence. However, by 1870, the Tupi tribes' population had declined to 250,000 Indigenous people, and by 1890, it had diminished to approximately 100,000.

Native Brazilian Population in Northeast Coast (Dutch estimates)
Period	Total
1540	+100,000
1640	9,000

==== First contacts ====
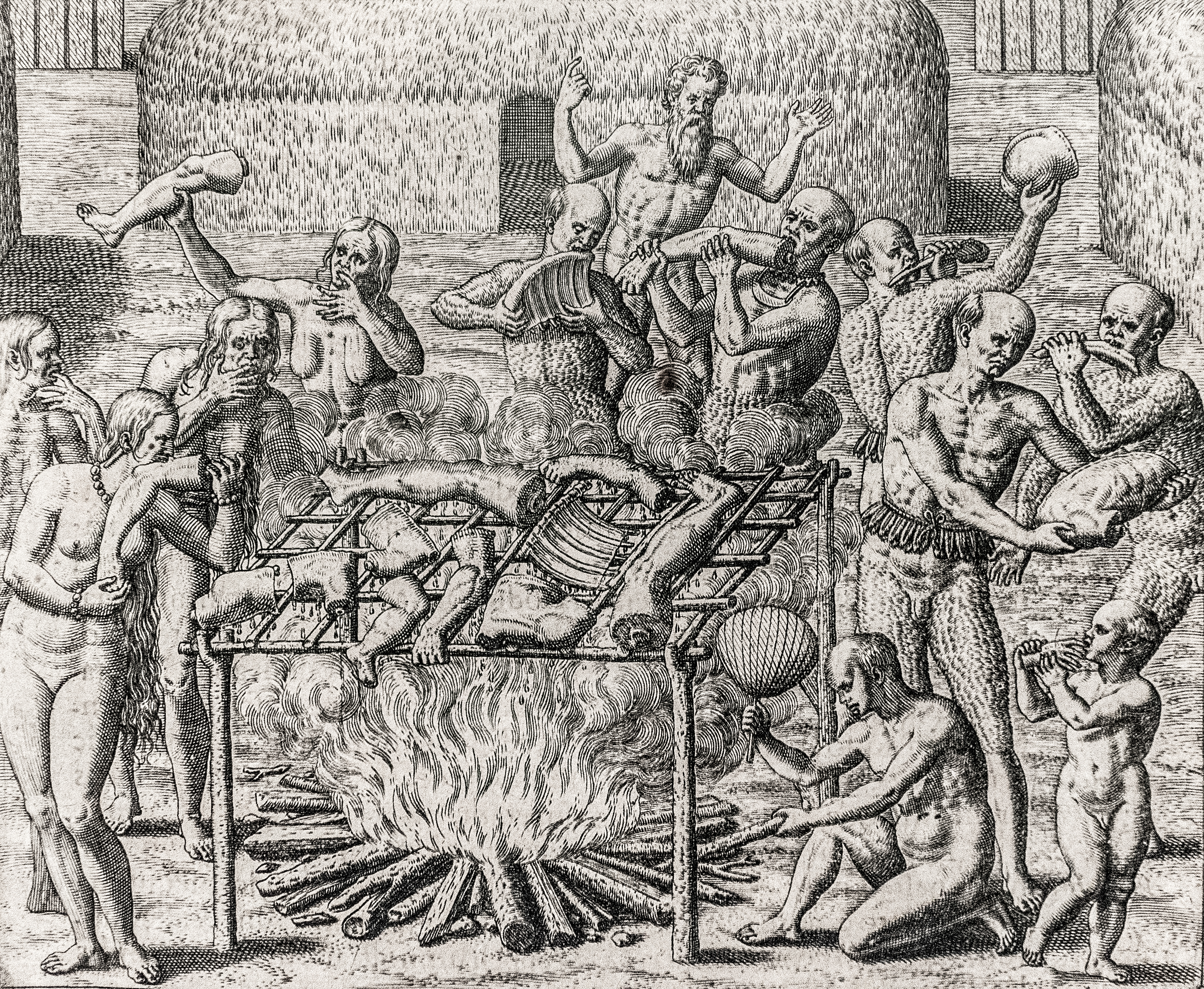
16th century depiction of cannibalism in the Brazilian Tupinambá tribe, as described by Hans Staden

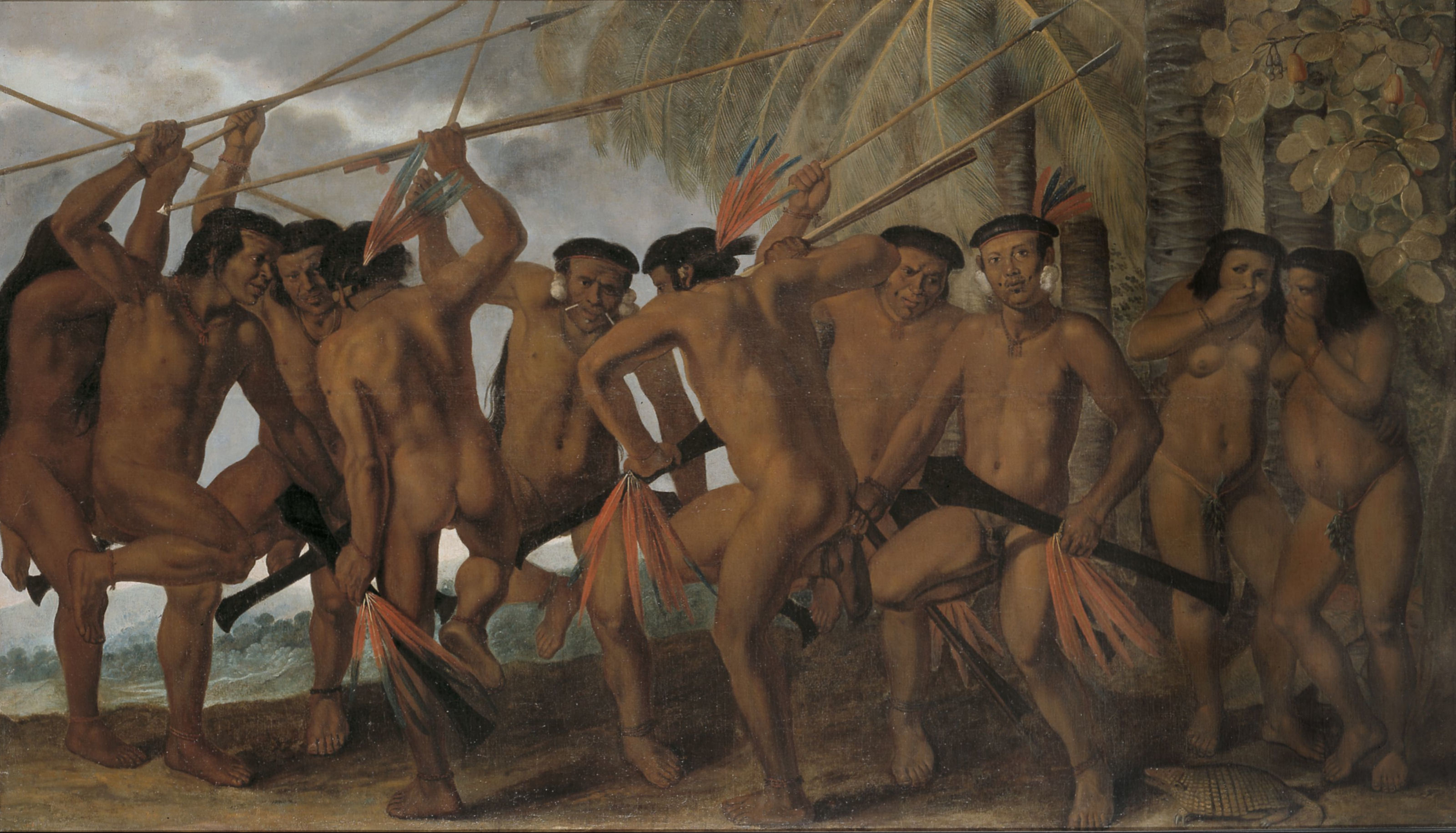
A painting by Albert Eckhout (Dutch), Tapuias (Brazil) dancing, 17th c.

When the Portuguese explorers first arrived in Brazil in April 1500, they found, to their astonishment, a wide coastline rich in resources and teeming with hundreds of thousands of Indigenous people living in a "paradise" of natural abundance. Pero Vaz de Caminha, the official scribe of Pedro Álvares Cabral, the commander of the discovery fleet that landed in the present state of Bahia, wrote a letter to the King of Portugal describing in glowing terms the beauty of the land.

In "Histoire des découvertes et conquêtes des Portugais dans le Nouveau Monde," Joseph-François Lafitau described Indigenous Brazilians as not wearing clothing but painting their entire bodies red. Their ears, noses, lips, and cheeks were pierced. The men shaved the front, top of the head, and over the ears, while women typically wore their hair loose or in braids. Both men and women accessorized with musical porcelain collars and bracelets, feathers, and dried fruits. Lafitau also described the ritualistic nature of their cannibalism practices and highlighted the important role of women in the household.

Before the arrival of Europeans, the territory of present-day Brazil had an estimated population of between 1 and 11.25 million inhabitants. During the first 100 years of contact, the Amerindian population was reduced by 90%. This drastic decline was primarily due to diseases and illnesses brought by the colonists, compounded by slavery and European violence. The Indigenous people were traditionally semi-nomadic tribes who subsisted on hunting, fishing, gathering, and migratory agriculture. For centuries, they lived semi-nomadic lives, managing the forests to meet their needs.

When the Portuguese arrived in 1500, the Native peoples primarily inhabited the coast and the banks of major rivers. Initially, Europeans viewed them as noble savages, and miscegenation began almost immediately. Portuguese claims of tribal warfare, cannibalism, and the pursuit of Amazonian brazilwood for its prized red dye convinced the colonists that they needed to "civilize" the Native peoples (originally, the Portuguese named Brazil Terra de Santa Cruz, but it later acquired its current name (see List of meanings of countries' names) from the brazilwood). However, like the Spanish in North America, the Portuguese brought diseases to which many Amerindians had no immunity. Measles, smallpox, tuberculosis, and influenza caused the deaths of tens of thousands. The diseases spread rapidly along Indigenous trade routes, likely leading to the annihilation of entire tribes without direct contact with Europeans.

By 1800, the population of Colonial Brazil had reached approximately 2.33 million, of which only around 174,900 were Indigenous. By 1850, that number had dwindled to an estimated 78,400 out of a total population of 5.8 million.

==== Slavery and the bandeiras ====
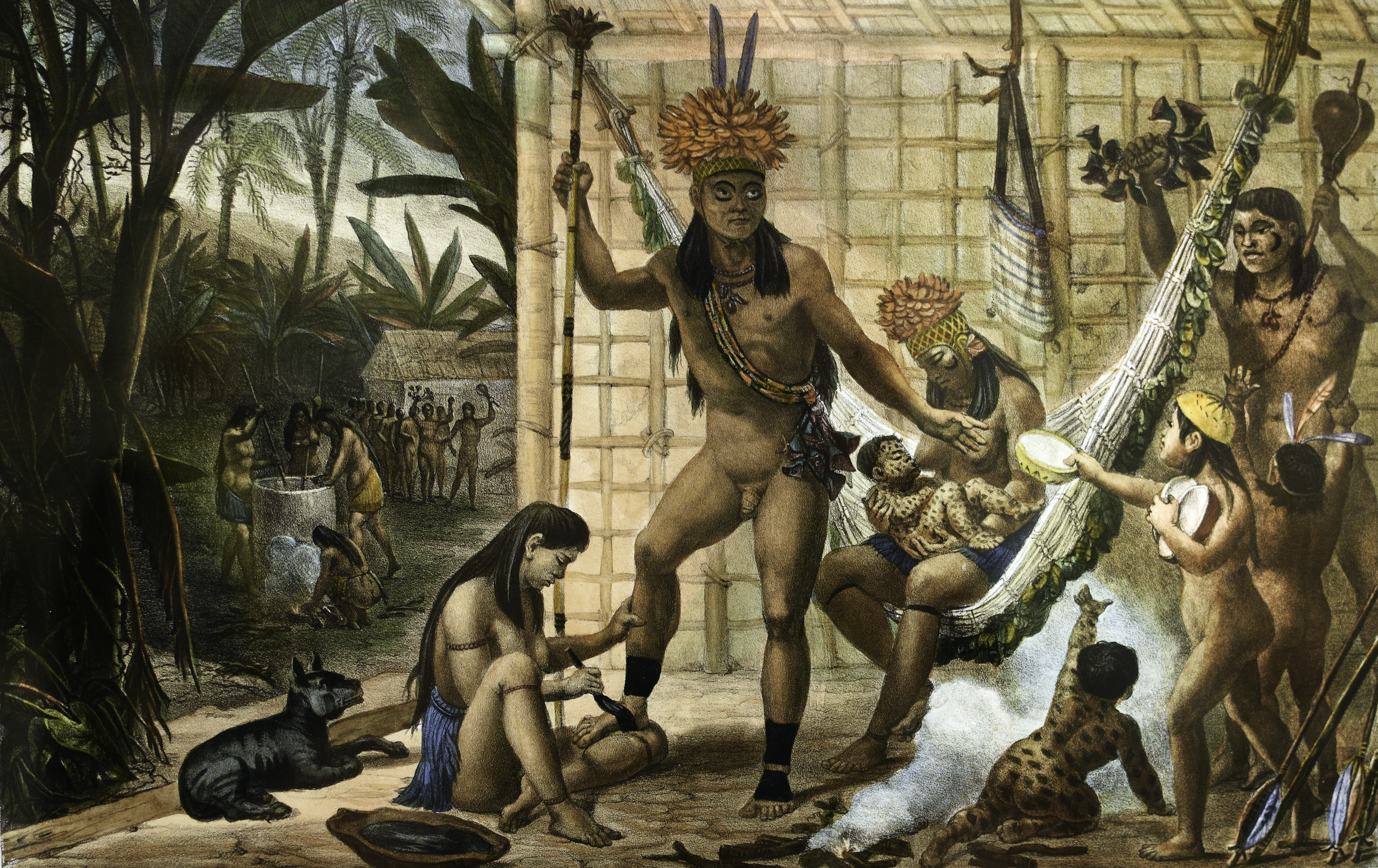
A painting representing Brazilian Amerindians during a ritual, Debret

The mutual feeling of wonderment and goodwill was to end in the subsequent years. The Portuguese colonists, all males, began to have children with Amerindian women, creating a new generation of mixed-race people who spoke Amerindian languages, including a Tupi language called Nheengatu. The children of these Portuguese men and Amerindian women soon formed the majority of the population. Groups of fierce explorers organized expeditions known as "bandeiras" (flags) into the interior to claim territory for the Portuguese crown and to search for gold and precious stones.

Intending to profit from the sugar trade, the Portuguese decided to cultivate sugar cane in Brazil and to use Indigenous slaves as the workforce, following the example of the Spanish colonies. However, capturing Indigenous people proved difficult. They were soon afflicted by diseases brought by the Europeans, against which they had no natural immunity, leading to high mortality rates.

==== The Jesuits ====
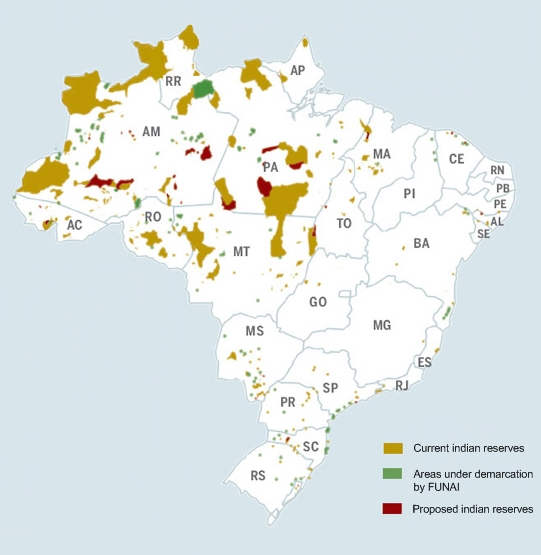
Map of Indigenous territories in Brazil.

Jesuit priests arrived with the first Governor General as clerical assistants to the colonists, with the intention of converting the Indigenous people to Catholicism. They argued that the Indigenous people should be regarded as human and succeeded in obtaining a Papal bull, Sublimis Deus, which declared that, regardless of their beliefs, they should be recognized as fully rational human beings with rights to freedom and private property, and thus should not be enslaved.

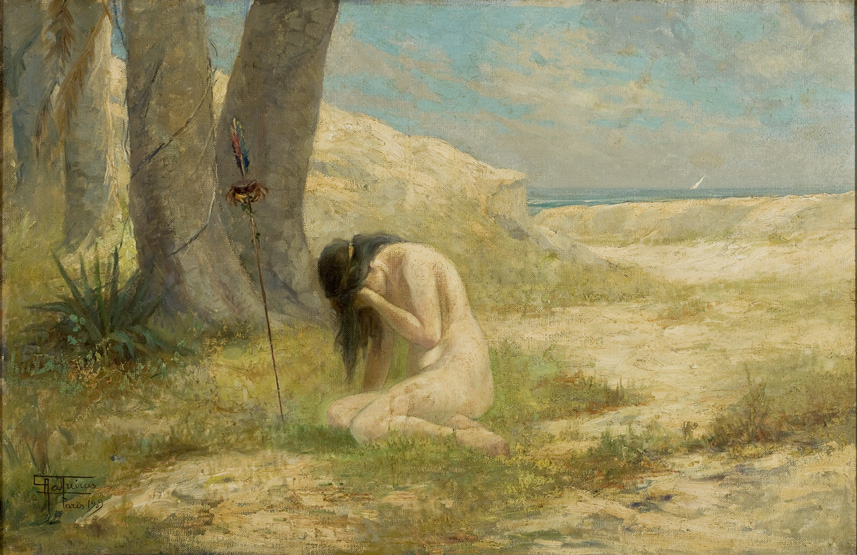
Iracema (1909), by Antônio Parreiras (1850–1937), a painting representing the Native Iracema who falls in love with a European colonizer

Jesuit priests, such as Fathers José de Anchieta and Manuel da Nóbrega, studied and recorded the Indigenous languages and founded mixed settlements, such as São Paulo dos Campos de Piratininga, where colonists and Amerindians lived side by side, spoke the same Língua Geral (common language), and freely intermarried. They also began to establish more remote villages inhabited only by "civilized" Amerindians, known as Missions or reductions (see the article on the Guarani people for more details).

By the middle of the 16th century, Jesuit priests, at the behest of Portugal's monarchy, had established missions throughout the country's colonies. They aimed to Europeanize and convert the Indigenous populations to Catholicism. Some historians argue that the Jesuits provided a period of relative stability for the Amerindians and opposed using them for slave labor. However, the Jesuits also contributed to European imperialism. Many historians view Jesuit involvement as an ethnocide of Indigenous culture, where the Jesuits attempted to 'Europeanize' the Indigenous Peoples of Brazil.

In the mid-1770s, the fragile coexistence between the Indigenous peoples and the colonists was once again threatened. Due to a complex diplomatic situation involving Portugal, Spain, and the Vatican, the Jesuits were expelled from Brazil, and their missions were confiscated and sold.

==== Wars ====
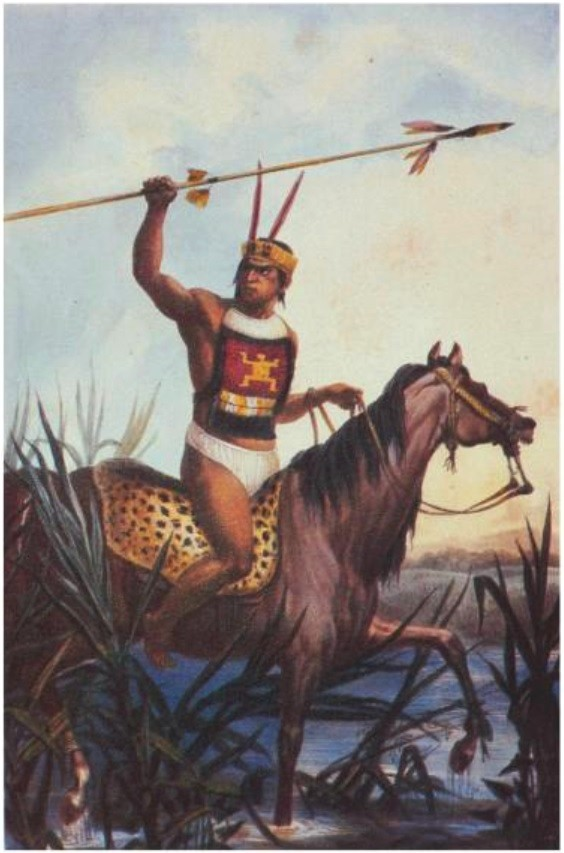
A Tamoio Warrior depicted by Jean-Baptiste Debret in the early 19th century

A number of wars broke out between various tribes, such as the Tamoio Confederation, and the Portuguese. Occasionally, the Amerindians allied with Portugal's enemies, such as the French during the France Antarctique episode in Rio de Janeiro. At other times, they sided with Portugal against rival tribes. During this period, a German soldier named Hans Staden was captured by the Tupinambá and later released. He documented his experiences in his famous book Warhaftige Historia und Beschreibung eyner Landtschafft der Wilden Nacketen, Grimmigen Menschfresser-Leuthen in der Newenwelt America gelegen (1557), which translates to True Story and Description of a Country of Wild, Naked, Grim, Man-Eating People in the New World, America.

There are documented accounts of smallpox being used as a biological weapon by some Brazilian villagers seeking to eliminate nearby Amerindian tribes, not always aggressively. One notable instance, according to anthropologist Mércio Pereira Gomes, occurred in Caxias, in southern Maranhão. Local farmers, desiring more land for their cattle farms, gave clothing from sick villagers (which would normally have been burned to prevent further infection) to the Timbira. The clothing infected the entire tribe, who had neither immunity nor a cure. Similar incidents occurred in other villages throughout South America.

==== The rubber trade ====
The 1840s brought trade and wealth to the Amazon with the development of the vulcanization process for rubber, leading to a worldwide surge in demand. The best rubber trees in the world grew in the Amazon, and thousands of rubber tappers began working the plantations. When the Amerindians proved to be a difficult labor force, peasants from surrounding areas were brought in. This created ongoing tension between the Indigenous population and the new arrivals, as the Amerindians felt their lands were being invaded in the pursuit of wealth.

==== The legacy of Cândido Rondon ====
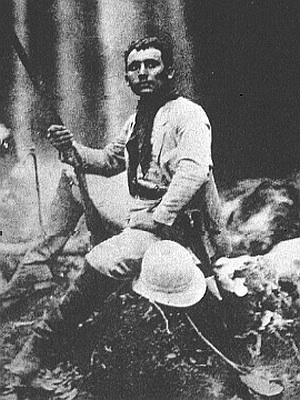
Marshal Cândido Rondon

In the 20th century, the Brazilian government adopted a more humanitarian approach and began offering official protection to the Indigenous people, including establishing the first Indigenous reserves. The situation for the Amerindians improved around the turn of the century when Cândido Rondon, a man of both Portuguese and Bororo ancestry, and an explorer and progressive officer in the Brazilian army, began working to gain the Amerindians' trust and establish peace. Rondon, assigned to extend telegraph communications into the Amazon, was a natural explorer with a keen curiosity. In 1910, he helped establish the Serviço de Proteção aos Índios (SPI), now known as FUNAI (Fundação Nacional do Índio, National Foundation for Indians). SPI was the first federal agency tasked with protecting Amerindians and preserving their culture. In 1914, Rondon accompanied Theodore Roosevelt on his famous expedition to map the Amazon and discover new species. During these travels, Rondon was appalled by the treatment of the Indigenous people by settlers and developers, and he became their lifelong friend and protector.

Rondon, who died in 1958, is considered a national hero in Brazil. The Brazilian state of Rondônia is named in his honor.

==== SPI failure and FUNAI ====
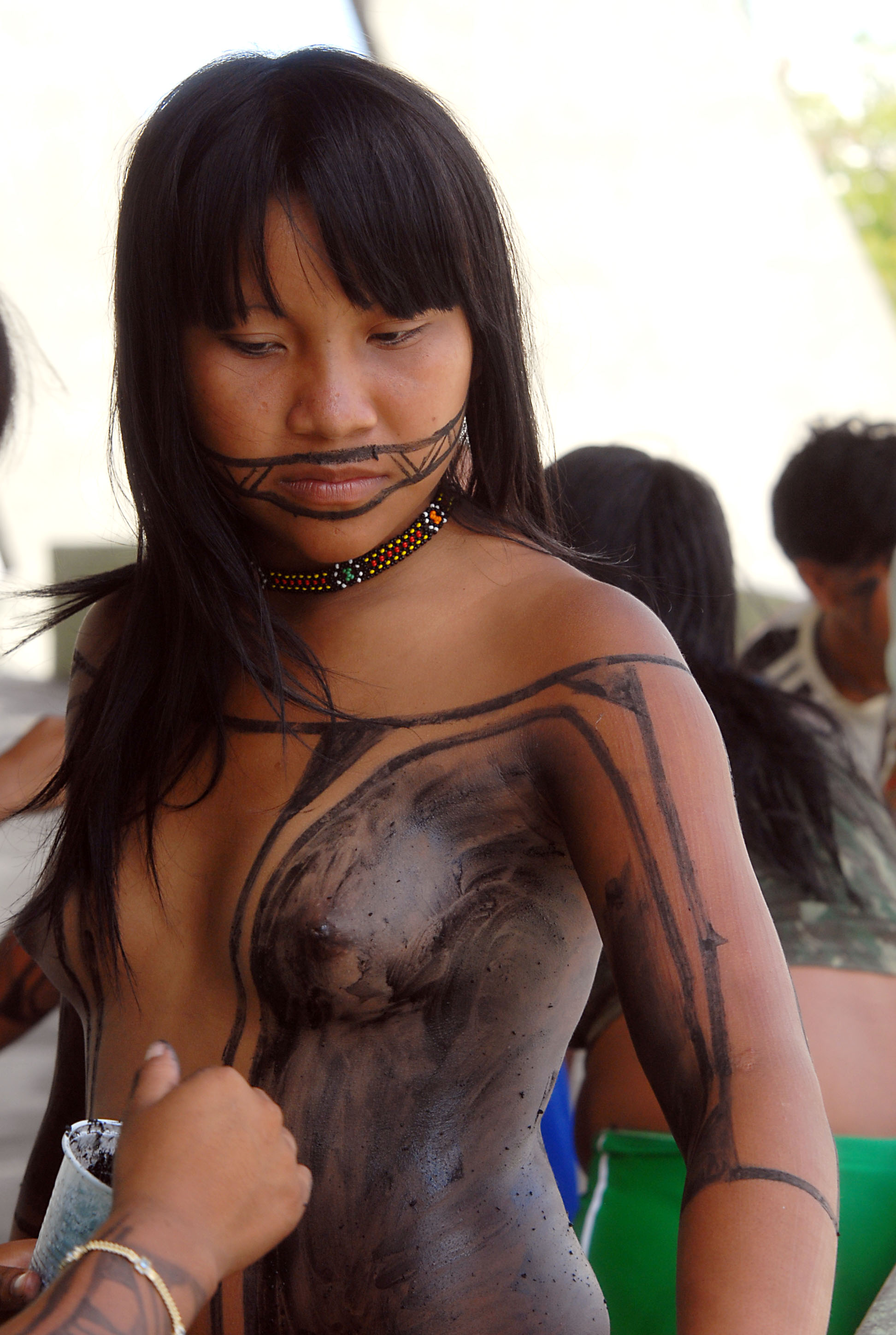
Tapirapé woman with body paint

After Rondon's pioneering work, the SPI was handed over to bureaucrats and military officers, and its effectiveness declined after 1957. The new officials did not share Rondon's deep commitment to the Amerindians. Instead, the SPI sought to integrate tribal groups into mainstream Brazilian society. The promise of wealth from reservation lands attracted cattle ranchers and settlers, who continued encroaching on Indigenous territories, with the SPI facilitating this intrusion. Between 1900 and 1967, an estimated 98 Indigenous tribes were wiped out.

Due largely to the efforts of the Villas-Bôas brothers, Brazil's first Indigenous reserve, the Xingu National Park, was established by the federal government in 1961.

During the social and political upheaval of the 1960s, reports of mistreatment of Amerindians increasingly reached Brazil's urban centers and began to affect public opinion. In 1967, following the publication of the Figueiredo Report, commissioned by the Ministry of the Interior, the military government launched an investigation into the SPI. It was soon revealed that the SPI was corrupt and failing to protect Native peoples, their lands, and their culture. The 5,000-page report cataloged atrocities including slavery, sexual abuse, torture, and mass murder.

The same year, the government established the Fundação Nacional do Índio (National Indian Foundation), known as FUNAI, which is responsible for protecting the interests, cultures, and rights of Indigenous peoples in Brazil. Some tribes have become significantly integrated into Brazilian society. The unacculturated tribes that have been contacted by FUNAI are supposed to be protected and accommodated within Brazilian society to varying degrees. By 1987, it was recognized that unnecessary contact with these tribes was causing illness and social disintegration. Uncontacted tribes are now meant to be shielded from intrusion and interference in their lifestyle and territory.

==== The military government ====
In 1964, a seismic political shift occurred when the Brazilian military took control of the government and abolished all existing political parties, creating a two-party system. For the next two decades, Brazil was ruled by a series of generals. The country's mantra was "Brazil, the Country of the Future," which the military government used to justify a massive push into the Amazon to exploit its resources, aiming to transform Brazil into one of the leading economies of the world.

Construction began on a transcontinental highway across the Amazon basin, designed to encourage migration to the region and facilitate trade. Funded by the World Bank, thousands of square miles of forest were cleared without regard for reservation status. Following the highway projects, giant hydroelectric projects were initiated, and vast areas of forest were cleared for cattle ranching. As a result, reservation lands suffered massive deforestation and flooding. The public works projects attracted very few migrants, but those who did arrive—largely poor settlers—brought new diseases that further devastated the Amerindian population.

==== Contemporary situation ====
Native Brazilians 1872–2022
Year	Population	% of Brazil
1872	386,955	3.90%
1890	1,295,795	▲9.04%
1991	294,135	▼0.20%
2000	734,127	▲0.43%
2010	817,963	0.43%
2022	1,227,642	▲0.60%
Source: Brazilian census

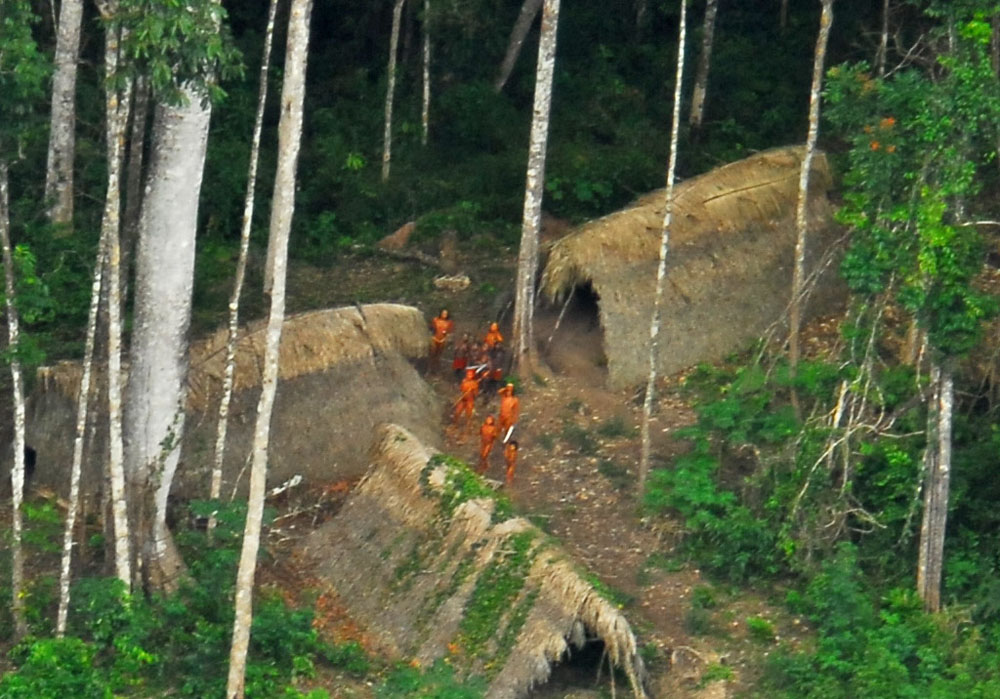
Members of an uncontacted tribe encountered in the Brazilian state of Acre in 2009

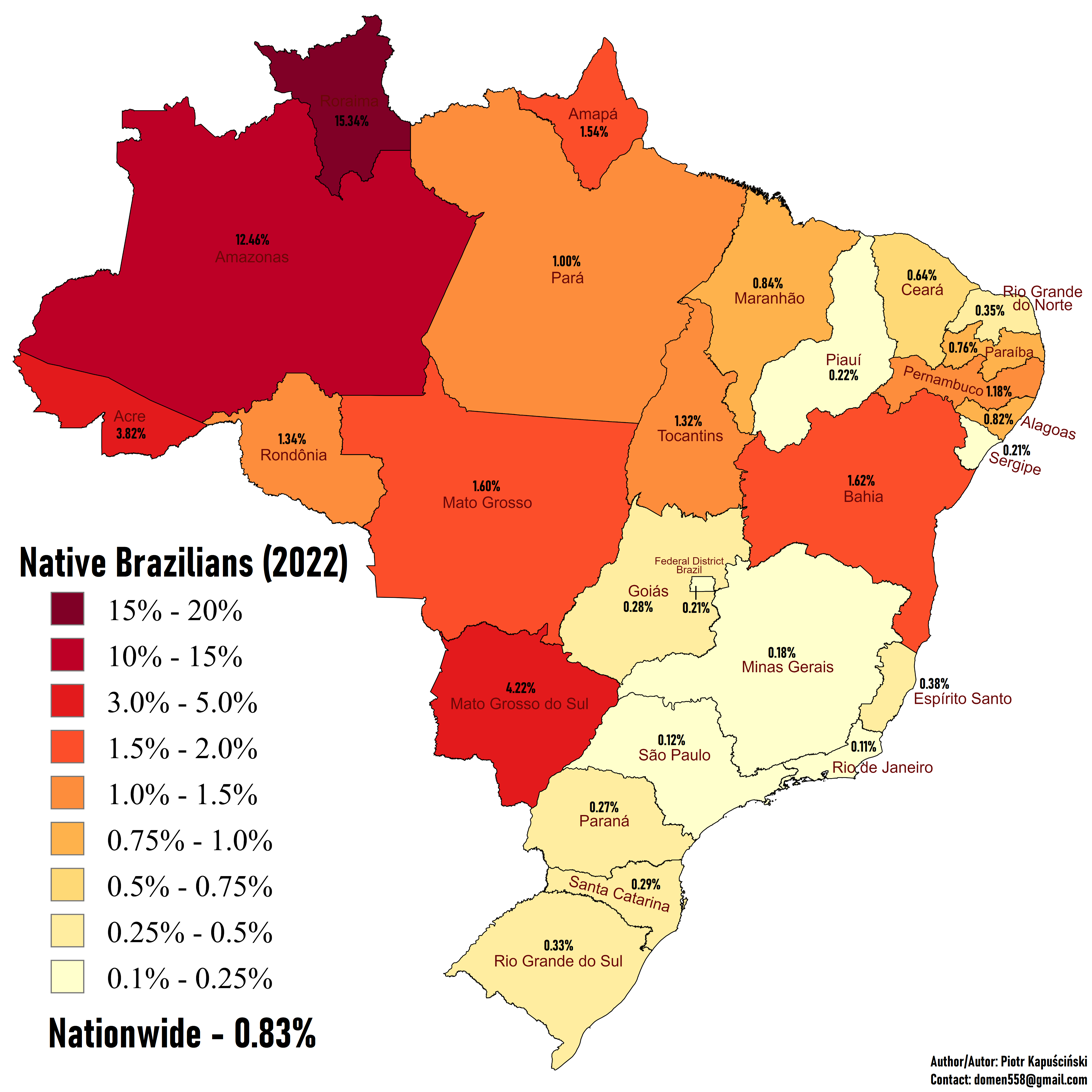
Brazilian states according to the percent of Indigenous Brazilians in 2022

The 1988 Brazilian Constitution recognizes the right of Indigenous peoples to pursue their traditional ways of life and to the permanent and exclusive possession of their "traditional lands," which are demarcated as Indigenous Territories. Additionally, Indigenous peoples are legally recognized as one of several "traditional peoples". In practice, however, Brazil's Indigenous people still face significant threats and challenges to their continued existence and cultural heritage.

The process of land demarcation is slow, often involving protracted legal battles, and FUNAI lacks sufficient resources to enforce legal protections on Indigenous lands. Since the 1980s, exploitation of the Amazon Rainforest for mining, logging, and cattle ranching had surged, which poses a severe threat to the region's Indigenous population. Settlers illegally encroaching on Indigenous land continue to destroy the environment necessary for traditional ways of life, provoke violent confrontations, and spread disease.

Groups such as the Akuntsu and Kanoê have been pushed to the brink of extinction in the past three decades. Deforestation for mining also affects the daily lives of Indigenous tribes in Brazil. For example, the Munduruku Amerindians have higher levels of mercury poisoning due to gold production in their area. On 13 November 2012, the national Indigenous people association from Brazil, APIB, submitted a human rights document to the United Nations, detailing complaints about proposed laws in Brazil that would further undermine their rights if approved.

Many terms from Native languages have been incorporated into official Brazilian Portuguese. For example, "Carioca," the term used to describe people born in the city of Rio de Janeiro, derives from the Tupi-Guaraní word meaning "house of the white (people)."

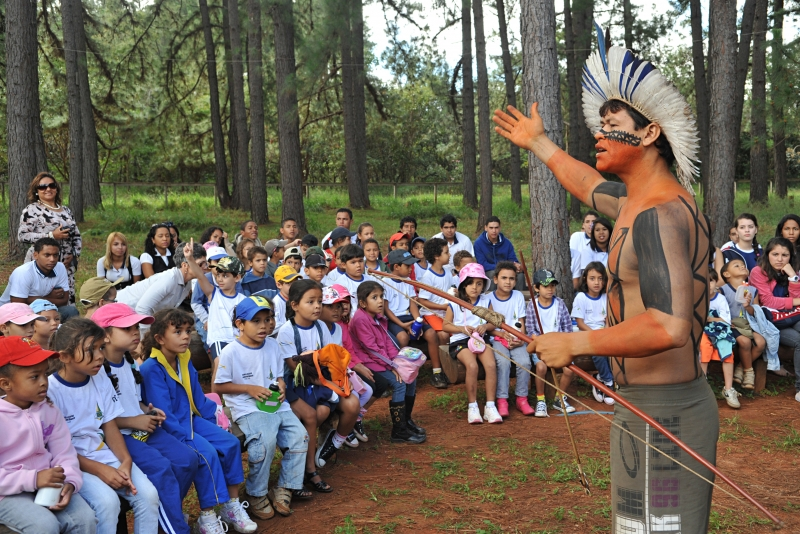
Fulni-ô representative talks about the culture of his people to schoolchildren in the Botanical Garden of Brasilia, in celebration of Indian Day, 2011

Within hours of taking office in January 2019, Bolsonaro made two major changes to FUNAI, affecting its responsibility to identify and demarcate Indigenous territories. He moved FUNAI from under the Ministry of Justice to the newly created Ministry of Human Rights, Family, and Women, and he delegated the identification of traditional habitats of Indigenous people and their designation as protected territories—a task attributed to FUNAI by the constitution—to the Agriculture Ministry. Bolsonaro argued that these territories had tiny, isolated populations and proposed integrating them into larger Brazilian society. Critics feared that such integration would lead to cultural assimilation of the Brazilian Natives. Several months later, Brazil's National Congress overturned these changes.

The European Union–Mercosur free trade agreement, which aims to create one of the world's largest free trade areas, has been denounced by environmental activists and Indigenous rights campaigners. They fear that the deal could lead to increased deforestation of the Amazon rainforest by expanding market access for Brazilian beef.

A 2019 report by the Indigenous Missionary Council on Violence Against Indigenous Peoples in Brazil documented an increase in invasions of Indigenous lands by loggers, miners, and land grabbers. The report recorded 160 cases in the first nine months of 2019, up from 96 cases for all of 2017. Additionally, the number of reported killings increased from 110 in 2017 to 135 in 2018.

On 5 May 2020, following an investigation by Human Rights Watch (HRW), Brazilian lawmakers released a report examining violence against Indigenous people, Afro-Brazilian rural communities, and others by people engaged in illegal logging, mining, and land grabbing.

== Indigenous rights movements ==
=== Urban rights movement ===
The urban rights movement is a recent development in the advocacy for Indigenous peoples' rights. Brazil has one of the highest levels of income inequality in the world, and a significant portion of its population includes Indigenous tribes migrating towards urban areas, both by choice and due to displacement. Beyond the urban rights movement, studies have shown that the suicide risk among the Indigenous population is 8.1 times higher than that of the non-Indigenous population.

Many Indigenous rights movements have been created through the gathering of various Indigenous tribes in urban areas. For example, in Barcelos, an Indigenous rights movement emerged due to "local migratory circulation." This is how many alliances form, creating a stronger network for mobilization. Indigenous populations living in urban areas also face struggles related to work, often being pressured into low-paying jobs. Programs like Oxfam have been used to help Indigenous people gain partnerships and start grassroots movements. Some of these projects overlap with environmental activism.

Many Brazilian youths are mobilizing due to increased social contact, as some Indigenous tribes remain isolated while others adapt to change. Access to education also affects these youths, prompting more groups to mobilize and fight for Indigenous rights.

=== Environmental and territorial rights movement ===
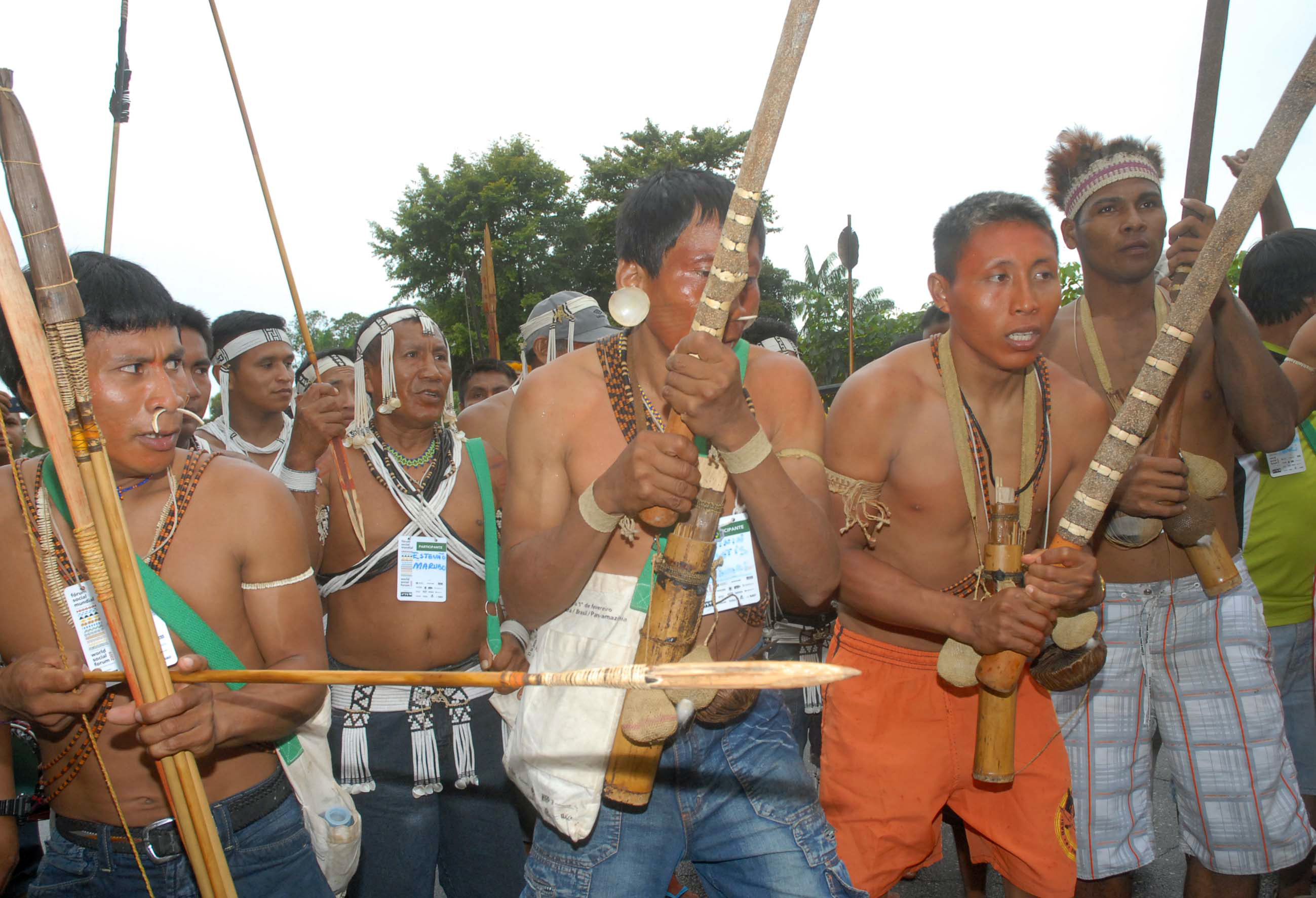
Indigenous protesters from Vale do Javari

==== Dynamics favouring recognition ====
Many of the rights and claims of Indigenous tribes align with the environmental and territorial rights movement. Although Indigenous people have secured 21% of the Brazilian Amazon as Indigenous land, many issues still threaten the sustainability of these territories today. Climate change is one reason Indigenous tribes emphasize the importance of retaining their territory.

Some Indigenous peoples and conservation organizations in the Brazilian Amazon have formed alliances, such as the partnership between the A'ukre Kayapo village and the Instituto Socioambiental (ISA) environmental organization. They focus on environmental, educational, and developmental rights. For example, Amazon Watch collaborates with various Indigenous organizations in Brazil to fight for both territorial and environmental rights. Activists emphasize traditional conservation efforts and expanding territorial rights for Indigenous people, given that "access to natural resources by Indigenous and peasant communities in Brazil has been considerably less and much more insecure."

Territorial rights for the Indigenous populations of Brazil are largely intertwined with socio-economic issues. There have been violent conflicts over land rights between the government and the Indigenous population, with political rights doing little to stop them. Movements like the Landless Workers' Movement (MST) work to prevent land from being concentrated in the hands of the elite in Brazil.

==== Dynamics opposing recognition ====
Environmentalists and Indigenous peoples are often viewed as opponents to economic growth and barriers to development. This perception arises because much of the land inhabited by Indigenous tribes could potentially be used for development projects, including dams and industrialization.

Groups self-identifying as Indigenous may lack intersubjective recognition. As a result, their claims to Indigenous Territories (TIs), which often involve the demarcation of large areas of land and may dispossess established local communities, can be challenged by others. Even neighboring kinship groups might dispute these claims, arguing that those making them are not "real Indians" due to factors like historical intermarriage (miscegenation), cultural assimilation, and stigma against self-identifying as Indigenous. Additionally, claims to TIs can be opposed by major landowning families from the rubber era or by peasants working the land, who might instead prefer the concept of extractive reserve.

== Education ==
The Afro-Brazilian and Indigenous History and Culture Law (Law No. 11.645/2008) mandates the teaching of Afro-Brazilian and Indigenous History and Culture in Brazil. The law was enacted on 10 March 2008, amending Law No. 9.394 of 20 December 1996, as modified by Law No. 10.639 of 9 January 2003. It requires that the official curriculum of the Brazilian education system include the mandatory theme of Afro-Brazilian and Indigenous History and Culture.

== Major ethnic groups ==
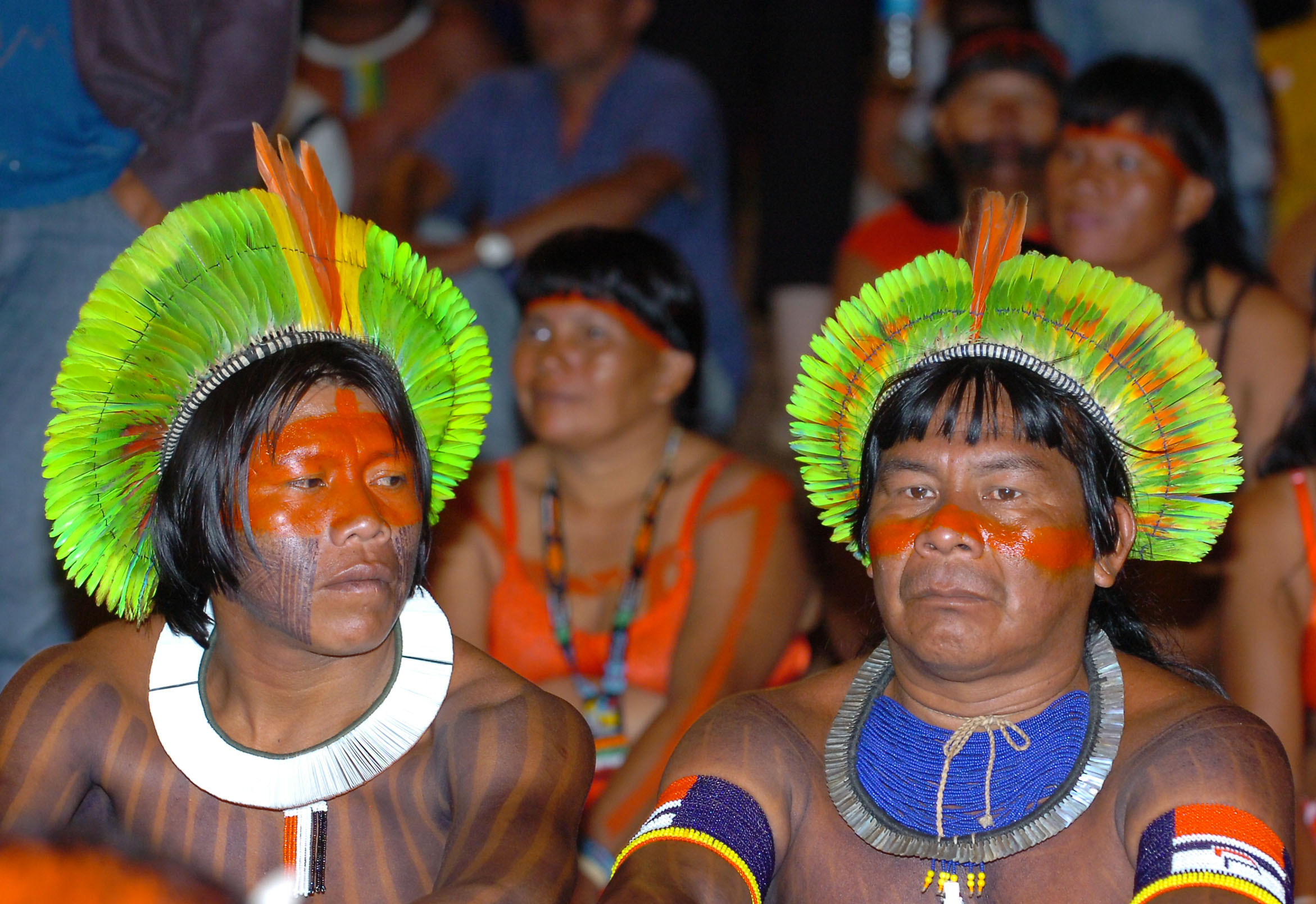
Two Indigenous men

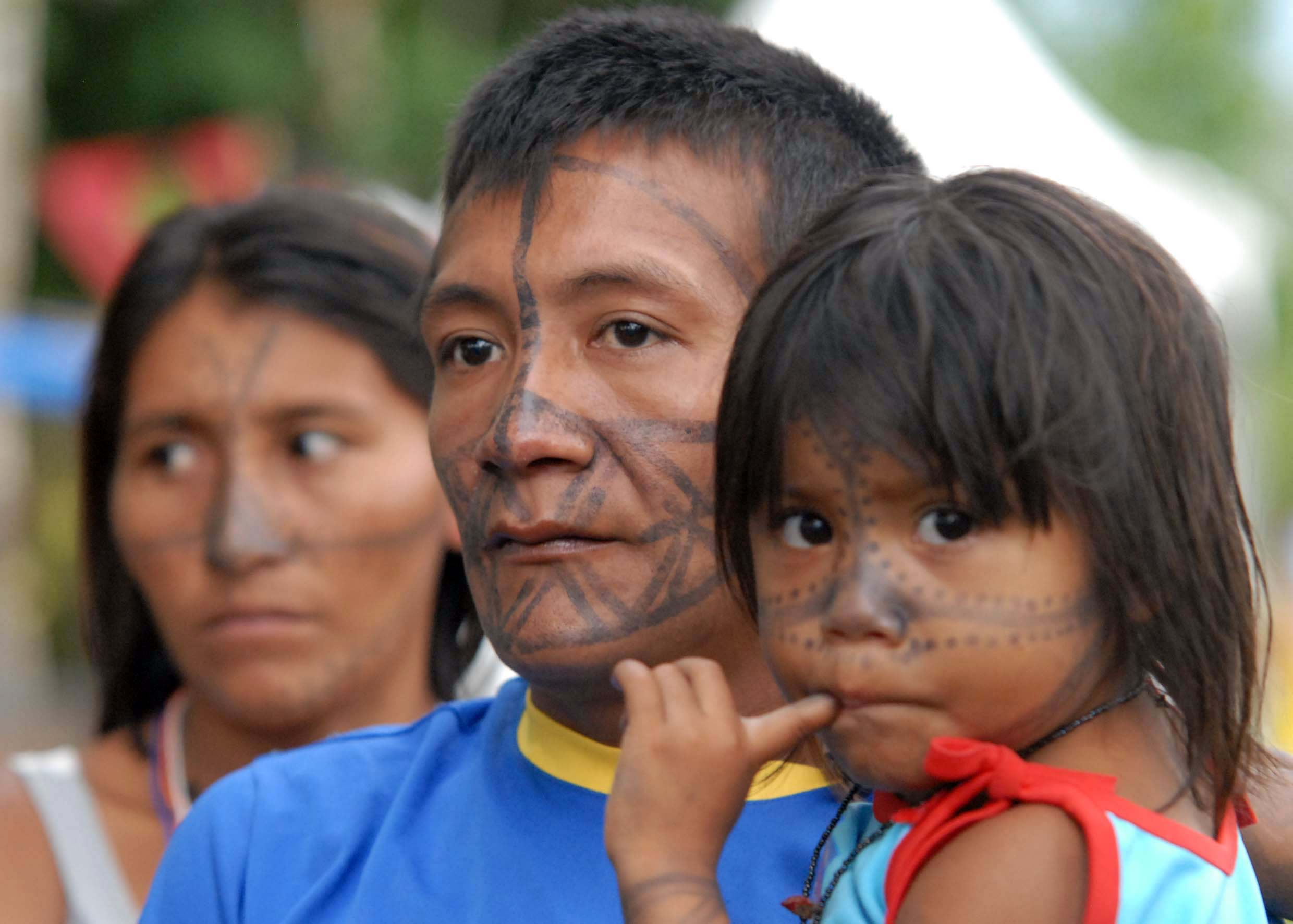
A Tucuxi family

- Amanayé
- Atikum
- Awá-Guajá
- Baniwa
- Botocudo
- Bará
- Enawene Nawe
- Guaraní
- Kadiwéu
- Kaingang
- Kamayurá (Kamaiurá)
- Karajá
- Kayapo
- Kubeo
- Kaxinawá
- Kokama
- Korubo
- Kulina Madihá
- Mbya
- Makuxi
- Matsés
- Mayoruna
- Munduruku
- Mura people
- Nambikwara
- Ofayé
- Pai Tavytera
- Panará
- Pankararu
- Pataxó
- Pirahã
- Paiter
- Potiguara
- Sateré Mawé
- Suruí do Pará
- Tapirape
- Terena
- Ticuna
- Tremembé
- Tupi
- Waorani
- Wapixana
- Wauja
- Witoto
- Xakriabá
- Xavante
- Xokleng
- Xukuru
- Yanomami

== See also ==
- Amazon Watch
- Amerindians
- Archaeology of the Americas
- Agriculture in Brazil
- Bandeirantes
- Belo Monte Dam
- Bering Land Bridge
- Camarão Indians' letters
- Darcy Ribeiro
- Encyclopedia of Indigenous Peoples in Brazil
- Ecotourism in the Amazon rainforest
- Chief Raoni
- COIAB
- Ceibo Alliance
- Brazilians
- Fundação Nacional do Índio
- Indigenous Peoples Day
- Índia pega no laço
- Indigenous peoples of South America
- Man of the Hole
- Museu do Índio
- Uncontacted peoples
- Percy Fawcett
- Sydney Possuelo
- Villas Boas brothers
