= Yaminawa language =

Panoan language of western Amazonia

Yaminawa
- Yaminahua
- Native to: Peru, Bolivia, Brazil
- Ethnicity: Yaminawá and related peoples
- Native speakers: 2,729 (2006–2011) c. 400 uncontacted speakers of Yora (2007)
- Language family: Panoan: Mainline Panoan; Nawa; Headwaters; Yaminawa
- Dialects: Brazilian Yaminawa dialects; Peruvian Yaminawa; Chaninawa; Chitonawa; Mastanawa (Nastanawa); Parkenawa (Yora, "Nawa"); Shanenawa (Xaninaua, Katukina de Feijó); Sharanawa (Marinawa subdialect), Shawannawa (Arara); Yawanawá; Yaminawa-arara; Nehanáwa †; Xinane Yura

Official status
- Official language in: Bolivia

Language codes
- ISO 639-3: yaa
- Glottolog: yami1255 Yaminawa Complex
- ELP: Yaminawa

Yaminawa (Yaminahua) is a Panoan language of western Amazonia. It is spoken by the Yaminawá and some related peoples.

Yaminawa constitutes an extensive dialect cluster. Attested dialects are two or more Brazilian Yaminawa dialects, Peruvian Yaminawa, Chaninawa, Chitonawa, Mastanawa (=Nastanawa), Parkenawa (= Yora or "Nawa"), Shanenawa (Xaninaua, = Katukina de Feijó), Sharanawa (= Marinawa), Shawannawa (= Arara), Yawanawá, Yaminawa-arara (obsolescent; very similar to Shawannawa/Arara), Nehanáwa^{†}). Xinane Yura, a recently discovered variety, is spoken by a group contacted in Kampa and Envira River Isolated Peoples Indigenous Territory, Acre, Brazil during the 2010s.

Very few Yaminawá speak Spanish or Portuguese, though the Shanenawa have mostly shifted to Portuguese. Other sources report that the Yamináwa have switched entirely to Portuguese and no longer use their original language.

== Phonology ==
The vowels of Yaminawa are /a, i, ɯ, u/. /i, ɯ, u/ can also be heard as [ɪ, ɨ, o]. Sharanawa, Yaminawa, and Yora have nasalized counterparts for each of the vowels, and demonstrate contrastive nasalization.

Consonants
	Bilabial	Alveolar	Retroflex	Palatal	Velar	Glottal
Plosive	p	t			k	
Affricate		t͡s		t͡ʃ		
Fricative	ɸ	s	ʂ	ʃ		h
Nasal	m	n				
Approximant		(l)		j	w	
Flap		ɾ				

[l] is heard as an allophone of /ɾ/. /j/ can also be heard as a nasal [ɲ].

Yawanawá has a similar phonemic inventory to Yaminawa, but uses a voiced bilabial fricative /β/ in place of the voiceless bilabial fricative /ɸ/. Yawanawá and Sharanahua have an additional phoneme, the voiced labio-velar approximant /w/. Shanewana has a labiodental fricative /f/ instead of /ɸ/.

Yaminawa has contrastive tone, with two surface tones, high (H) and low (L).

== Grammar ==
Yaminawa is a polysynthetic, primarily suffixing language that also uses compounding, nasalization, and tone alternations in word-formation. Yaminawa exhibits split ergativity; nouns and third person pronouns pattern along ergative-absolutive lines, while first and second person pronouns pattern along nominative-accusative lines. Yaminawa verbal morphology is extensive, encoding affective (emotional) meanings and categories like associated motion. Yaminawa also has a set of switch reference enclitics that encode same or different subject relationships as well as aspectual relationships between the dependent (marked) clause and the main clause.
