= Uru-Pa-In language =

Tupian language spoken in Brazil

Uru-Pa-In
- Native to: Brazil
- Region: Rondônia
- Ethnicity: Uru-Pa-In people
- Native speakers: (200 cited 1995)
- Language family: Tupian?: Tupi–Guarani; Kawahib?; Uru-Pa-In

Language codes
- ISO 639-3: urp
- Glottolog: urup1235

Uru-Pa-In is an isolated Tupi–Guaraní language of the state of Rondônia, in the Amazon region of Brazil. Speakers have no permanent contact with the outside world.
