= Languages of Peru =

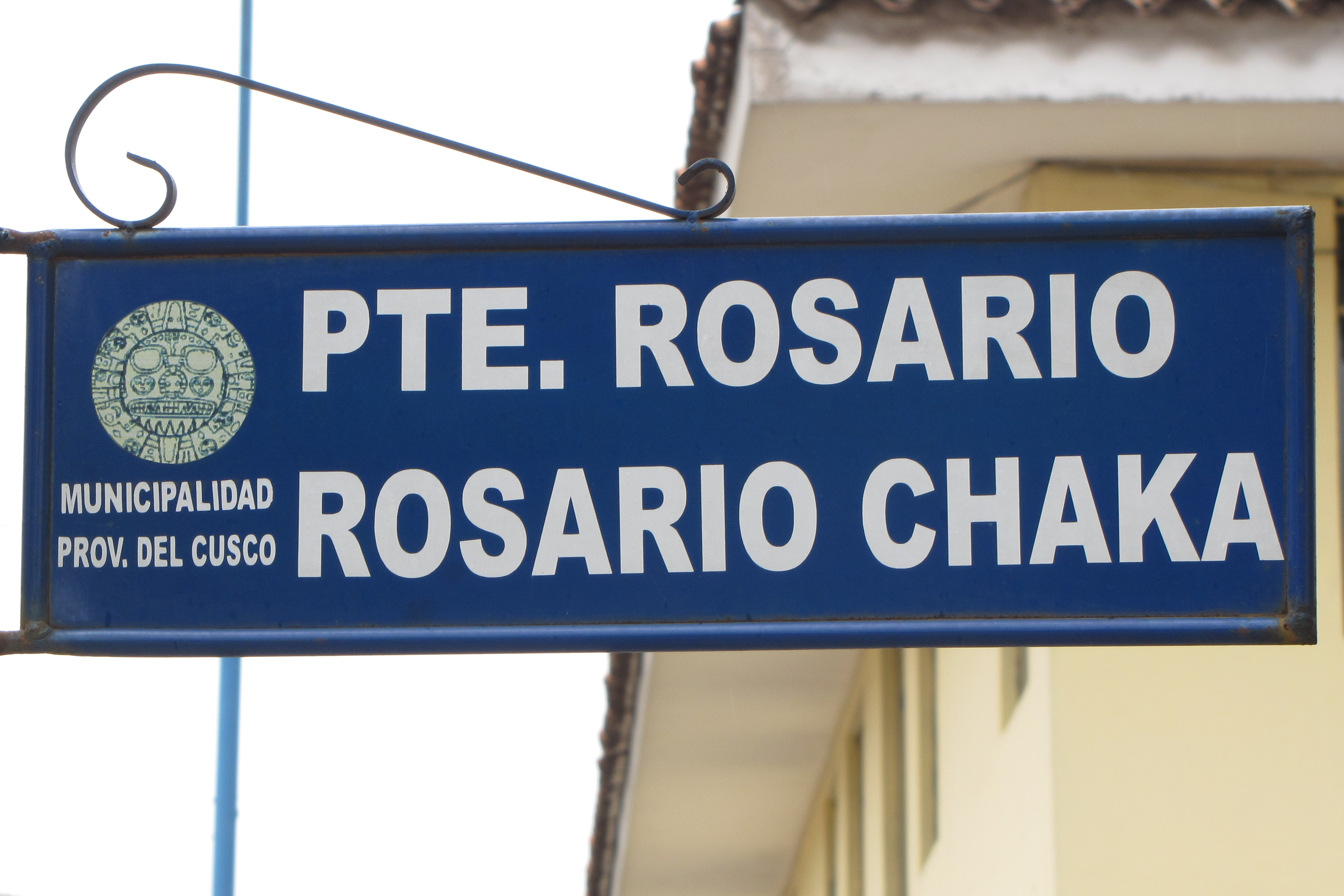
- Sign in Cuzco in Quechua and Spanish (pte. is short for puente).
- Official: Spanish (nationwide level); Indigenous languages (in areas where they are common)
- Indigenous: Quechua, Aymara, languages of the Arawakan, Piro, Upper Amazon, Bora–Witoto, Cahuapanan, Chicham, Panoan, Quechuan, Tucanoan, Tupian and Zaparoan families
- Vernacular: Peruvian Spanish, Andean Spanish, Amazonic Spanish, Peruvian Ribereño Spanish, Equatorial Spanish
- Minority: French, Arabic, Hindi, Chinese, Japanese, Italian, Portuguese
- Foreign: English
- Signed: Peruvian Sign Language, Inmaculada Sign Language, Sivia Sign Language
- Keyboard layout: No officially designated keyboard layout. Both the Latin American Spanish layout and the Spaniard Spanish layout are de facto in use side by side

Peru has many languages in use, with its official languages being Spanish, Quechua and Aymara. Spanish was introduced by conquistadors in the 1500s; it began being taught in the time of José Pardo instead of the country's Native languages, especially the languages in the Andes. In the beginning of the 21st century, it was estimated that in this multilingual country, about 50 very different and popular languages are spoken: which reduces to 44 languages if dialects are considered variants of the same language. The majority of these languages are Indigenous, but the most common language is Spanish, which is spoken by about 94.4% of the population. Spanish is followed by the country's Indigenous languages, especially all types of Quechua (13.9% combined) and Aymara (1.7%), which also have co-official status according to Article 48 of the Constitution of Peru. In addition, Amazonian languages are spoken in the Amazon Basin and the Peruvian Sign Language is used by the Deaf community in Peru. In urban areas of the country, especially the coastal region, most people are monolingual and only speak Spanish, while in many rural areas of the country, especially in the Amazon, multilingual populations are prevalent.

== Linguistic situation ==
According to Peter Landerman, the Jesuits translated fragments of Christian scriptures into about 150 Indigenous languages of the Peruvian Amazon area. Of those, about 60 survive today.

=== Linguistic legislation ===
At the political level, Spanish is the official language of Peru and, in areas where they are common, Quechua, Aymara, and some other Indigenous languages are also the official language.

=== Number of speakers ===
In Peru, there are close to 40 languages within the Amazon rainforest which are usually grouped into 17 families and divide into close to 120 recognizable local varieties.

Population by Native Language:

Language	1993		2007		2017	
Language	Total	Percentage	Total	Percentage	Total	Percentage
Total	19,190,624	100%	24,687,537	100%	26,887,584	100%
Spanish	15,405,014	80.3%	20,718,227	83.9%	22,209,686	82.6%
Quechua	3,177,938	16.6%	3,261,750	13.2%	3,735,682	13.9%
Aymara	440,380	2.3%	434,370	1.8%	444,389	1.7%
Ashaninka	No data	No data	No data	No data	68,667	0.3%
other Indigenous languages	132,174	0.7%	223,194	0.9%	141,350	0.5%
foreign languages	35,118	0.2%	21,097	0.1%	48,910	0.2%
Sign Language	No data	No data	28,899	0.1%	10,447	0.0%
No Response	No data	No data	No data	No data	203,829	0.8%

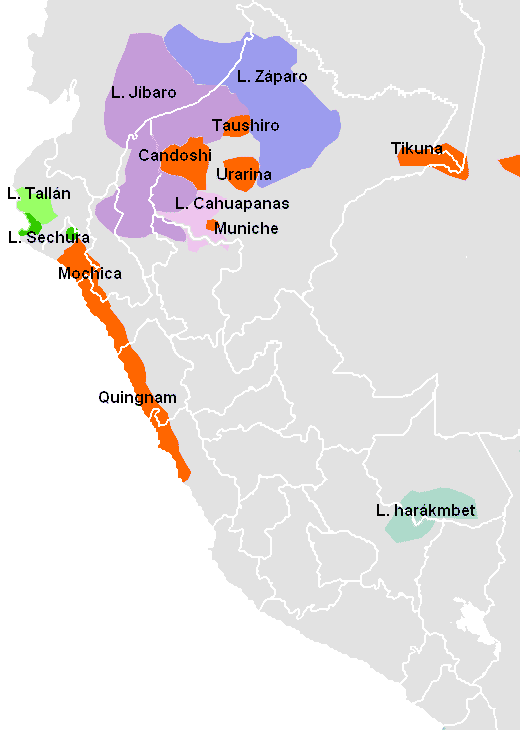
Small language families in Peru (20th century).

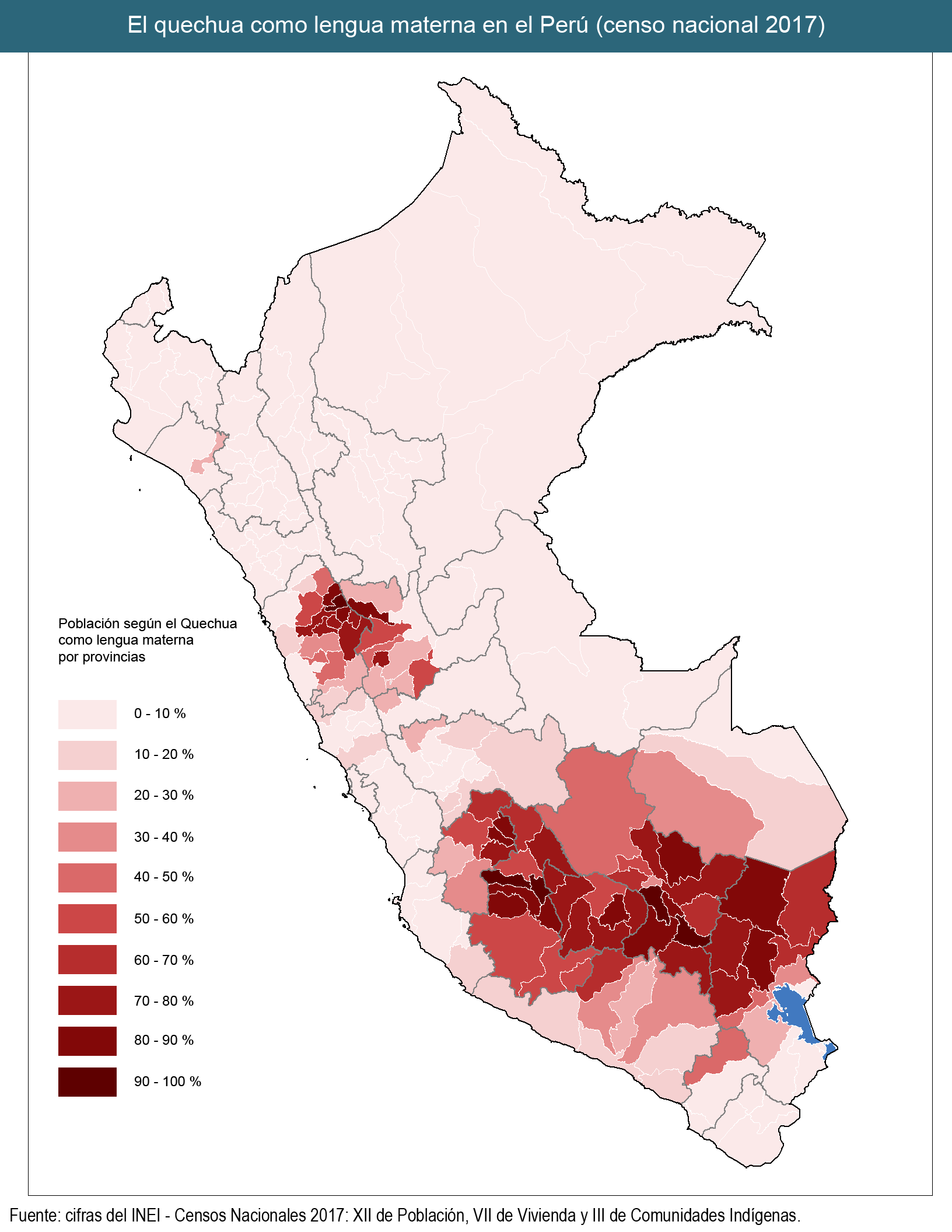
Native speakers of Quechua in Peru (National census 2017)

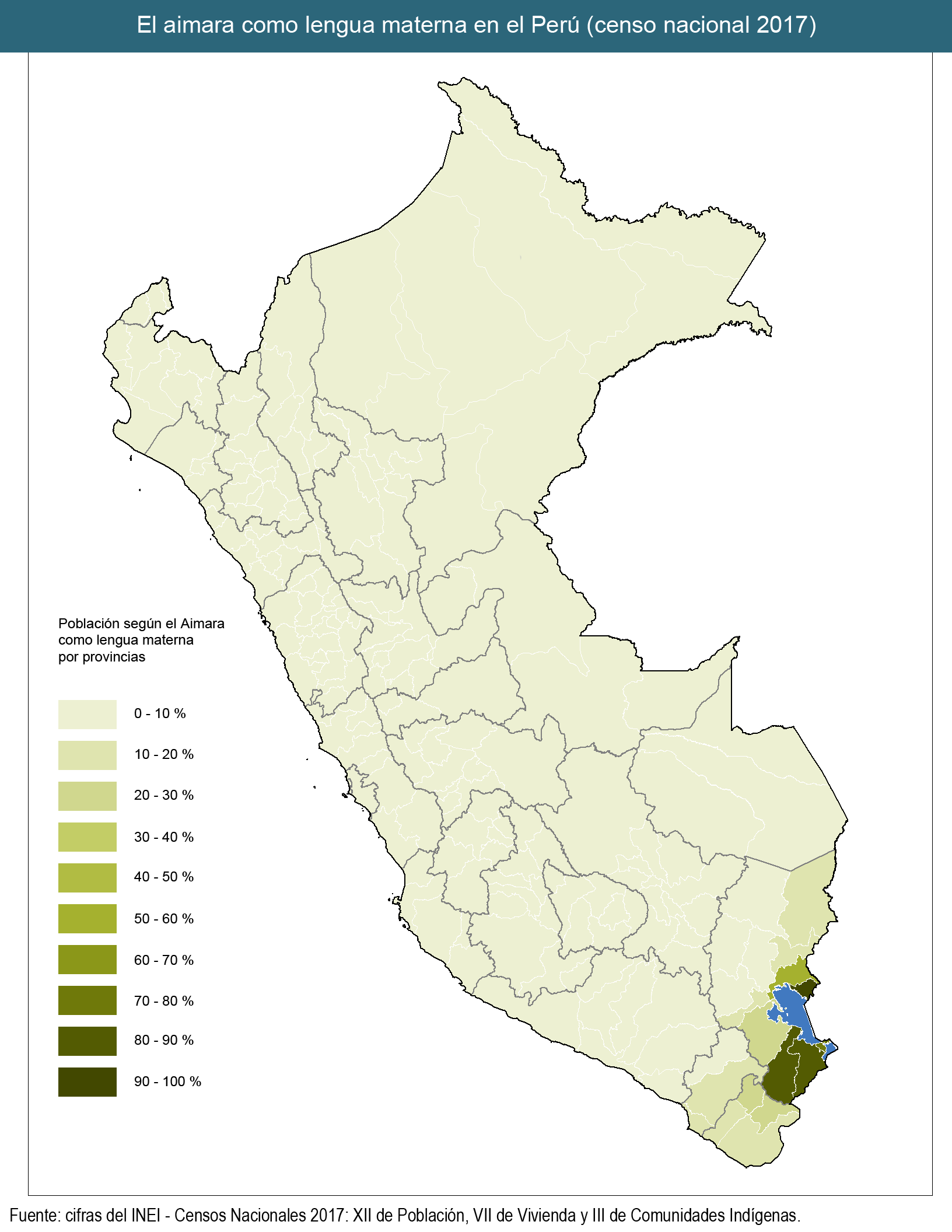
Native speakers of Aymara in Peru (National census 2017)

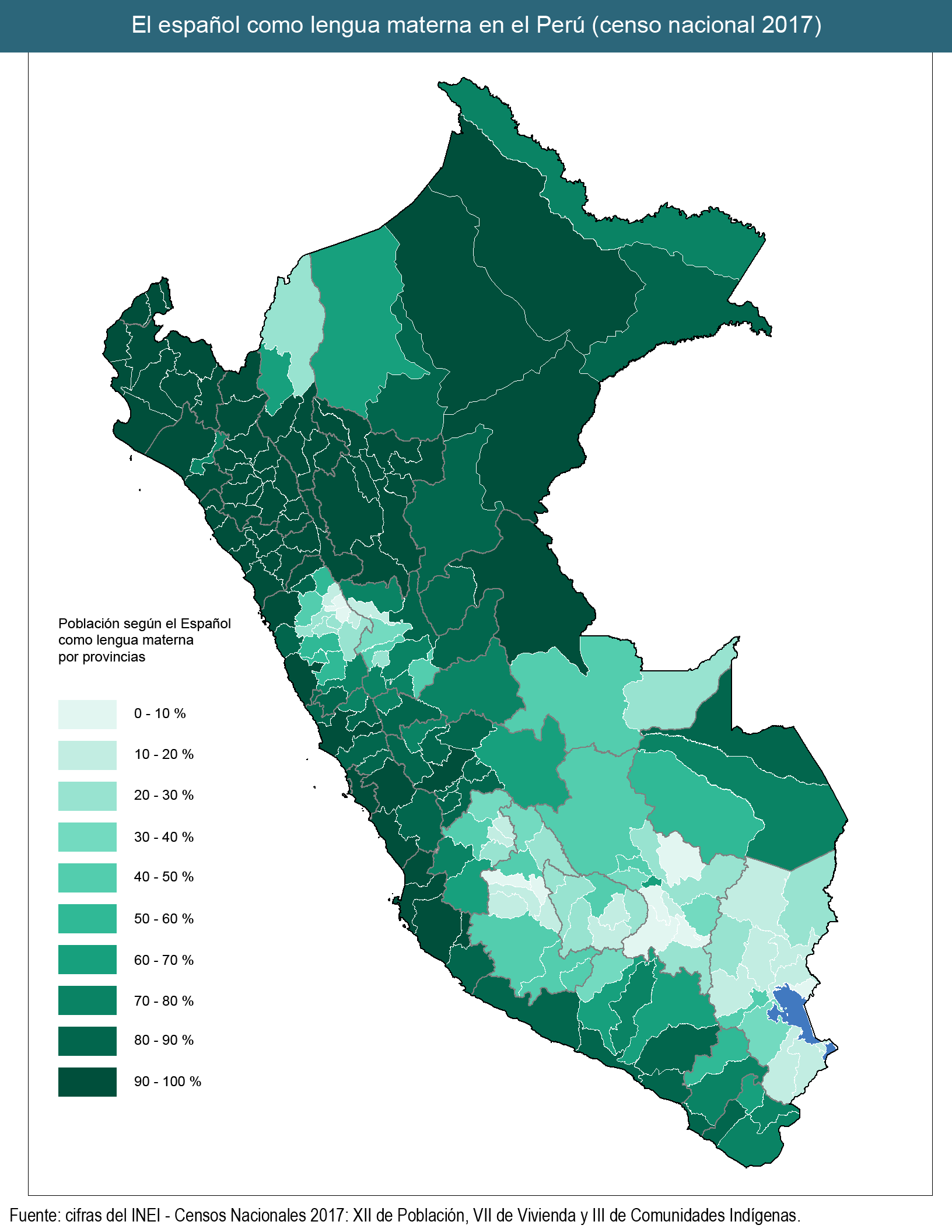
Native speakers of Spanish in Peru (National census 2017)

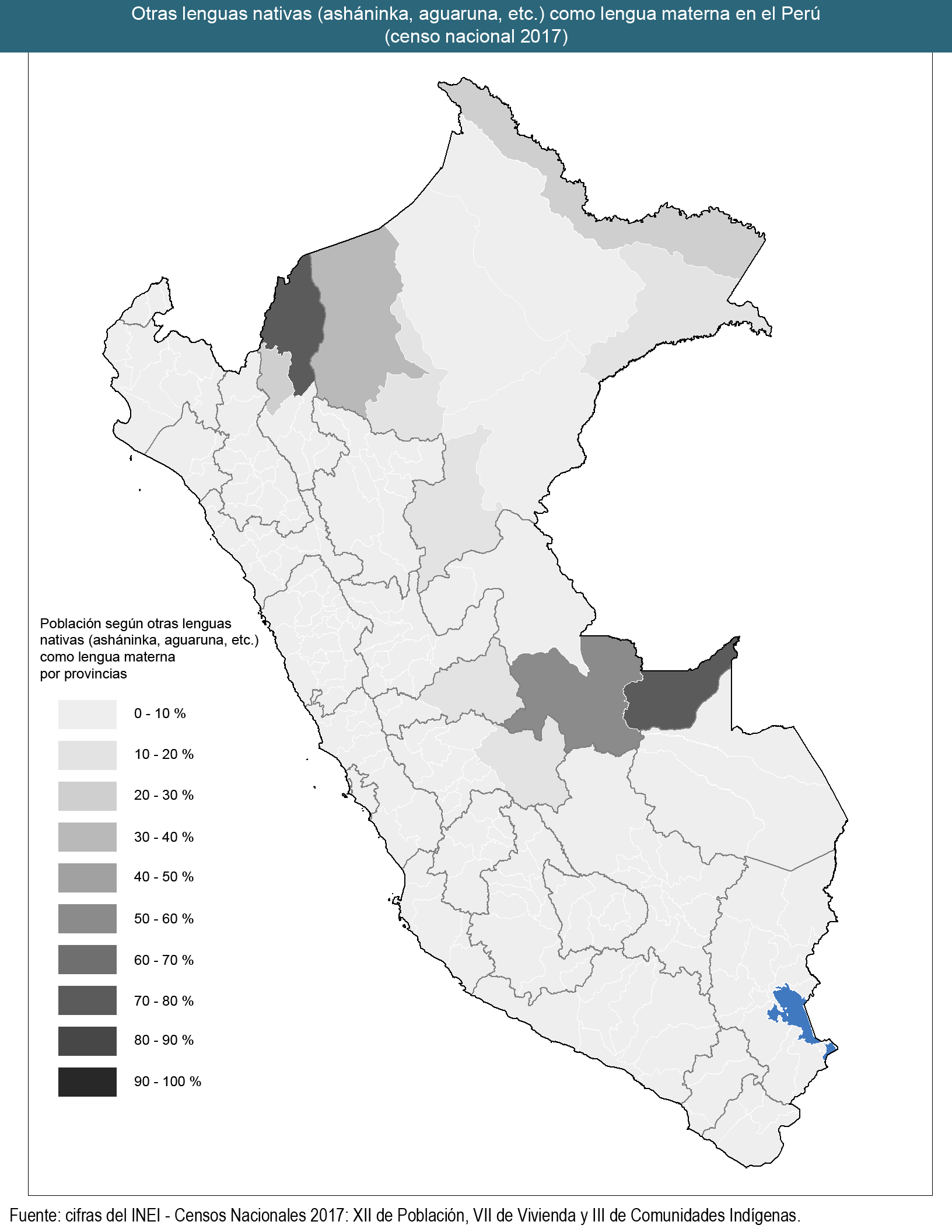
Other Native languages (Asháninka, Aguaruna, etc.) (National census 2017)

== Indigenous languages ==
Indigenous languages of Peru are primarily located in the central Andes and the Amazon rainforest. Many northern Andes languages were located along the northern coast and the northern Andes, but most of them died in the 19th century. The only Native languages in the Andes that are common are Quechua, Aymara, Jaqaru, and Kawki; while in the Amazon region, there is an abundance of various Native languages. In the Amazon, the most common languages are Asháninka and Aguaruna. There are more than 15 defined linguistic families in Peru's territory and another 15 or more languages that are isolated or not classified.

The actual number of languages in Peru could have exceeded 300. Some authors even say that there could have been 700 languages. However, since the conquering of Latin America by Spain and after Peru's independence, the disappearance of Indigenous people (because of conquest and mixing of languages) and discrimination against Indigenous languages because of mixed populations, as well as the Peruvian government (which imposed Spanish), led to the number of Indigenous languages dropping to fewer than 150. Today the number of Indigenous languages is still large, but much less than it used to be. The following list shows the languages spoken today in Peru and those that went extinct since the 20th century.

=== Classification ===
The Indigenous languages of Peru belong to more than 15 language families, and some isolated or unclassified languages, which are extinct today (represented in the table as †), are also documented to more than 15 languages. The following list organizes more than 95 languages within existing and extinct languages:

Classification of Indigenous Languages in Peru
Family	Group		Language	Territory
Aymaran A family that is well-known demographically and historically, the north branch suffered from the expansion of Quechua, while the south branch still has many speakers today.		Northern	Jaqaru	Yauyos
Aymaran A family that is well-known demographically and historically, the north branch suffered from the expansion of Quechua, while the south branch still has many speakers today.		Southern	Aymara	Puno
Arawan A small family with languages in Brazil and Peru. Some authors and scholars consider these languages related to Arawak.	Dení-kulina		Kulina	Ucayali
Arawak This is the family with the most languages in South America.	Northern	North Amazonian	Resígaro	Loreto
Arawak This is the family with the most languages in South America.	Southern	Southwest	Iñapari	Madre de Dios
Arawak This is the family with the most languages in South America.	Southern	Southwest	Mashko-Piro	Madre de Dios
Arawak This is the family with the most languages in South America.	Southern	Southwest	Yine	Madre de Dios, Ucayali, Loreto
Arawak This is the family with the most languages in South America.	Southern	Rural	Asháninca	Cuzco
Arawak This is the family with the most languages in South America.	Southern	Rural	Asheninca	Cuzco
Arawak This is the family with the most languages in South America.	Southern	Rural	Axininca	Cuzco
Arawak This is the family with the most languages in South America.	Southern	Rural	Campa de Pajonal	
Arawak This is the family with the most languages in South America.	Southern	Rural	Caquinte	Cuzco
Arawak This is the family with the most languages in South America.	Southern	Rural	Machiguenga	Cuzco
Arawak This is the family with the most languages in South America.	Southern	Rural	Nomatsiguenga	Cuzco
Arawak This is the family with the most languages in South America.	Southern	Amuesha-Chamicuro	Amuesha	Cuzco
Arawak This is the family with the most languages in South America.	Southern	Amuesha-Chamicuro	Chamicuro (†)	Loreto
Bora-witoto Some scholars question whether the Bora languages and the Witoto languages form a single family due to the large diversity between the 2 groups.	Bora		Bora	Loreto
Bora-witoto Some scholars question whether the Bora languages and the Witoto languages form a single family due to the large diversity between the 2 groups.	Bora		Muinane	Loreto
Bora-witoto Some scholars question whether the Bora languages and the Witoto languages form a single family due to the large diversity between the 2 groups.	Witoto		Coixama	Loreto
Bora-witoto Some scholars question whether the Bora languages and the Witoto languages form a single family due to the large diversity between the 2 groups.	Witoto		Meneca	Amazonas Department
Bora-witoto Some scholars question whether the Bora languages and the Witoto languages form a single family due to the large diversity between the 2 groups.	Witoto		Murui	
Bora-witoto Some scholars question whether the Bora languages and the Witoto languages form a single family due to the large diversity between the 2 groups.	Witoto		Nonuya	
Bora-witoto Some scholars question whether the Bora languages and the Witoto languages form a single family due to the large diversity between the 2 groups.	Witoto		Nüpode witoto	Loreto
Bora-witoto Some scholars question whether the Bora languages and the Witoto languages form a single family due to the large diversity between the 2 groups.	Witoto		Ocaina	Loreto
Cahuapanas			Cayahuita	Loreto
Cahuapanas			Jebero	Loreto
Candoshi-chirino			Candoshi	Loreto
Candoshi-chirino			Chirino (†)	Amazonas, Cajamarca
Harákmbut–Katukinan			Harákmbut	Madre de Dios River
Hibito-Cholón			Cholón (†)	San Martín
Hibito-Cholón			Hibito (†)	San Martín
Chicham	Aguaruna		Aguaruna	Amazonas, Cajamarca, San Martín
Chicham	Shuar-Huambisa		Achuar	Loreto
Chicham	Shuar-Huambisa		Huambisa	Amazonas, Loreto
Pano-Tacanan One of the families with the most different languages in Peru.	Pano	Yaminawa	Amahuaca	Madre de Dios, Ucayali
Pano-Tacanan One of the families with the most different languages in Peru.	Pano	Yaminawa	Cashinahua	Ucayali
Pano-Tacanan One of the families with the most different languages in Peru.	Pano	Yaminawa	Sharanahua	Ucayali
Pano-Tacanan One of the families with the most different languages in Peru.	Pano	Yaminawa	Yaminawa	Ucayali
Pano-Tacanan One of the families with the most different languages in Peru.	Pano	Chacobo	Arazaire (†)	Cuzco
Pano-Tacanan One of the families with the most different languages in Peru.	Pano	Chacobo	Atsahuaca (†)	Madre de Dios
Pano-Tacanan One of the families with the most different languages in Peru.	Pano	Chacobo	Yamiaca (†)	Madre de Dios
Pano-Tacanan One of the families with the most different languages in Peru.	Pano	Capanawa	Capanahua	Loreto
Pano-Tacanan One of the families with the most different languages in Peru.	Pano	Capanawa	Isconahua	Ucayali
Pano-Tacanan One of the families with the most different languages in Peru.	Pano	Capanawa	Marubo	Ucayali
Pano-Tacanan One of the families with the most different languages in Peru.	Pano	Capanawa	Pánobo (†)	Loreto
Pano-Tacanan One of the families with the most different languages in Peru.	Pano	Capanawa	Remo (†)	Loreto
Pano-Tacanan One of the families with the most different languages in Peru.	Pano	Capanawa	Shipibo	Ucayali
Pano-Tacanan One of the families with the most different languages in Peru.	Pano	Others	Cashibo	Ucayali, Huánuco
Pano-Tacanan One of the families with the most different languages in Peru.	Pano	Others	Mayo-Pisabo	Loreto
Pano-Tacanan One of the families with the most different languages in Peru.	Pano	Others	Mayoruna	Loreto
Pano-Tacanan One of the families with the most different languages in Peru.	Pano	Others	Nahua	Cuzco, Madre de Dios, Ucayali
Pano-Tacanan One of the families with the most different languages in Peru.	Pano	Others	Nocamán (†)	Ucayali
Pano-Tacanan One of the families with the most different languages in Peru.	Pano	Others	Sensi (†)	Loreto
Pano-Tacanan One of the families with the most different languages in Peru.	Tacanan		Ese'ejja	Madre de Dios
Peba-Yaguan			Peba (†)	Loreto
Peba-Yaguan			Yagua	Loreto
Peba-Yaguan			Yameo (†)	Loreto
Quechuan These languages make a family of different languages, and not every variety of Quechua is known yet.	Quechua I	Central Quechua I	Quechua ancashino	Ancash
Quechuan These languages make a family of different languages, and not every variety of Quechua is known yet.	Quechua I	Central Quechua I	Quechua huanca	Junín
Quechuan These languages make a family of different languages, and not every variety of Quechua is known yet.	Quechua I	Central Quechua I	Quechua yaru	Junín, Pasco
Quechuan These languages make a family of different languages, and not every variety of Quechua is known yet.	Quechua I	Peripheral Quechua I	Quechua de Pacaraos	Distrito de Pacaraos(Huaral)
Quechuan These languages make a family of different languages, and not every variety of Quechua is known yet.	Quechua II	Quechua II-A	Quechua cajamarquino	Provincia de Cajamarca
Quechuan These languages make a family of different languages, and not every variety of Quechua is known yet.	Quechua II	Quechua II-A	Quechua Incawasi-Cañaris	Distritos de Incahuasi y Cañaris
Quechuan These languages make a family of different languages, and not every variety of Quechua is known yet.	Quechua II	Quechua II-A	Quechua yauyino	Provincia de Yauyos
Quechuan These languages make a family of different languages, and not every variety of Quechua is known yet.	Quechua II	Quechua II-B	Quechua chachapoyano	Provincias de Chachapoyas y Luya
Quechuan These languages make a family of different languages, and not every variety of Quechua is known yet.	Quechua II	Quechua II-B	Quechua lamista	Provincia de Lamas, Valle del Huallaga
Quechuan These languages make a family of different languages, and not every variety of Quechua is known yet.	Quechua II	Quechua II-B	Quichua norteño	Loreto
Quechuan These languages make a family of different languages, and not every variety of Quechua is known yet.	Quechua II	Quechua II-C	Quechua ayacuchano	Ayacucho, Huancavelica
Quechuan These languages make a family of different languages, and not every variety of Quechua is known yet.	Quechua II	Quechua II-C	Quechua cuzqueño	Cuzco
Ticuna-Yuri			Ticuna	Loreto
Tucanoan This family is formed by many local languages in the south of Colombia and in parts of Brazil.	Western	Southwestern	Orejón	Loreto
Tupí This is the family with the most languages in South America, especially in Brazil.	Tupí-Guaraní	subgroup III	Cocama-cocamilla	Loreto
Tupí This is the family with the most languages in South America, especially in Brazil.	Tupí-Guaraní	subgroup III	Omagua	Loreto
Záparoan	Group I		Cahuarano (†)?	Loreto
Záparoan	Group I		Iquito	Loreto
Záparoan	Group II		Arabela	Loreto
Záparoan	Group II		Andoa-shimigae(†)?	Loreto
Záparoan	Group II		Conambo (†)	Loreto
Záparoan	Group II		Záparo (†)?	Loreto
Language isolates Languages not known to be related to any other language or each other			Culli (†)	La libertad, Cajabamba
Language isolates Languages not known to be related to any other language or each other			Mochica (†)	Departamento de Lambayeque
Language isolates Languages not known to be related to any other language or each other			Munichi (†)	Loreto
Language isolates Languages not known to be related to any other language or each other			Omurano (†)	departamento
Language isolates Languages not known to be related to any other language or each other			Puquina (†)	Alrededor del lago Titicaca
Language isolates Languages not known to be related to any other language or each other			Sechura (†)	Department of Piura
Language isolates Languages not known to be related to any other language or each other			Tallan (†)	Department of Piura
Language isolates Languages not known to be related to any other language or each other			Taushiro	Loreto
Language isolates Languages not known to be related to any other language or each other			Urarina	Loreto
Unclassified Languages There exists a group of languages with rare documentation and references to extinct villages, that cannot be classified due to lack of information. For more examples, see List of unclassified languages of South America.			Aguano (†)	Loreto
Unclassified Languages There exists a group of languages with rare documentation and references to extinct villages, that cannot be classified due to lack of information. For more examples, see List of unclassified languages of South America.			Bagua (†)	Amazonas, Cajamarca
Unclassified Languages There exists a group of languages with rare documentation and references to extinct villages, that cannot be classified due to lack of information. For more examples, see List of unclassified languages of South America.			Chachapoya (†)	La Libertad, San Martín
Unclassified Languages There exists a group of languages with rare documentation and references to extinct villages, that cannot be classified due to lack of information. For more examples, see List of unclassified languages of South America.			Copallén (†)	Amazonas
Unclassified Languages There exists a group of languages with rare documentation and references to extinct villages, that cannot be classified due to lack of information. For more examples, see List of unclassified languages of South America.			Patagón (†) (cariban?)	Amazonas, Cajamarca
Unclassified Languages There exists a group of languages with rare documentation and references to extinct villages, that cannot be classified due to lack of information. For more examples, see List of unclassified languages of South America.			Quingnam (†)	Lima, Ancash, La Libertad
Unclassified Languages There exists a group of languages with rare documentation and references to extinct villages, that cannot be classified due to lack of information. For more examples, see List of unclassified languages of South America.			Sacata (†)	Cajamarca
Unclassified Languages There exists a group of languages with rare documentation and references to extinct villages, that cannot be classified due to lack of information. For more examples, see List of unclassified languages of South America.			Tabancale (†)	Cajamarca
Unclassified Languages There exists a group of languages with rare documentation and references to extinct villages, that cannot be classified due to lack of information. For more examples, see List of unclassified languages of South America.			Terikaka (†) (zápara?)	Loreto

=== Quechua ===
Quechua is the second language of Peru, in terms of number of speakers. It is the official language in areas where it is the dominant language, even though from a linguistic point of view, it's a family of related languages. (Ethnologue assigns separate language codes to more than 25 varieties of Quechua in Peru.)

Geographic distribution of the first divisions of the Quechua family

=== Aymara ===
Aymara has the third largest number of speakers within Peru, with about half a million speakers in the country. It is most common in the southern part of the country, in parts of Puno, Moquegua, and Tacna.

=== Amazonian languages ===
The rest of the Indigenous languages of Peru have more than 105 thousand speakers in total, and are located mostly in the east and north part of the country, specifically in Loreto, Madre de Dios, and Ucayali. The northern part of Peru (Loreto) is probably the most diverse part of the country from a linguistic standpoint since that part contains an abundance of the small families of languages and isolated languages.

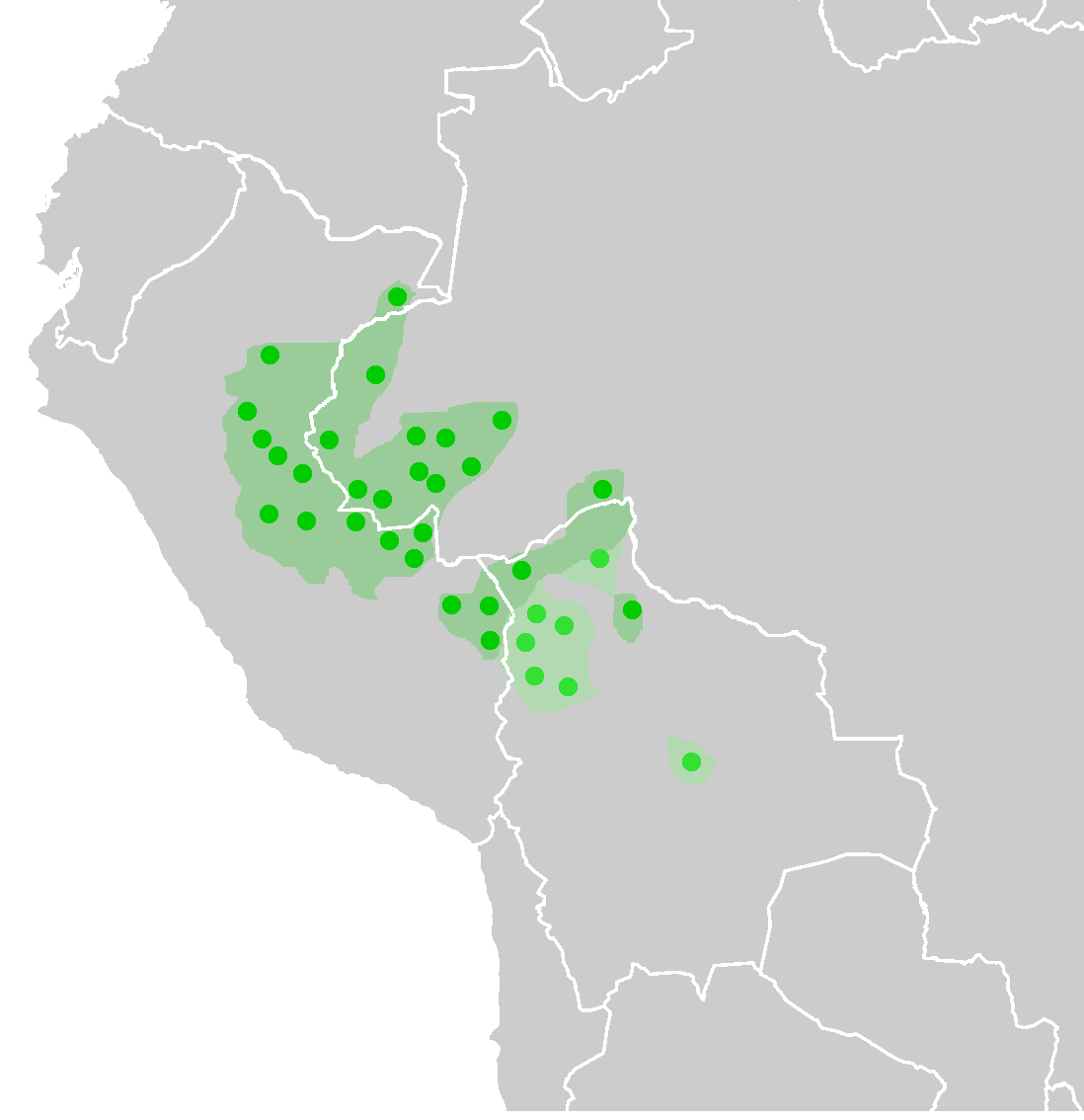
Pano-Takanan languagesPano languages (dark green) and Takana languages (clear green). The points indicate documented locations of the languages.

In northern Peru, there are 5 small families of languages: Cahuapana, Chicham, Zápara, Peba-yagua, and Bora-witoto. These families of languages are mostly spoken in Loreto, but also in areas connected to Brazil, Colombia, and Ecuador. The majority of these groups were destroyed in the "Rubber Boom" at the beginning of the 20th century. In the Putumayo river region, the population fell from 50 thousand to between 7-10 thousand within the first decade of the 20th century.

In the Ucayali area, Pano languages are most common, while in the high jungle of the Ucayali River basin the southern Arahuaca languages are most common.

In the Peruvian Amazon over forty languages, which are usually grouped into 14 families and diversifying about 120 recognizable local varieties are spoken.

== Other minority languages ==
A foreign language of a territory is a language whose historical origin is known and falls outside of said that territory and arrived in this territory through conquest, immigration, or colonization.

=== Sign language ===
The sign language of Peru (Peruvian Sign Language) is used by the deaf community in the country. The 2007 census did not include any questions about the LSP, but this was corrected in 2017.

=== Other foreign languages ===
In addition to Spanish, which is the most common foreign language, there exist other languages that also did not originate in Peru, and are spoken due to the results of migration.

While it is true that there are many foreign colonies in Peru, the majority of these abandoned their original language. Within the first communities of immigrants lived people from Japan, China, and in smaller amounts people from Germany (central jungle in Pozuzo and Oxapampa), Italy (urban areas of Lima and Arequipa), and Arabic and Hindi (Urdu) areas. These last two are due to the recent waves of immigrants from Palestine and Pakistan (especially to the southern department of Tacna). French is also a language that is rooted in Loreto due to a campaign by the French Alliance. French was well received in the Peruvian population, especially in Iquitos. Lately English has also had a big influence due to the number of tourists and American/British residence. Portuguese is also used in areas like Ucayali, Loreto, and Madre de Dios. These areas border Brazil, whose official language is Portuguese.

== Use in government ==
Historically name registers only captured Spanish or Western-inspired names. In 2019, the government began encouraging the use of Indigenous names in name registers.

There is discrimination against the ways of pronouncing Spanish in the interior of Peru and against languages other than the Spanish of Lima, the capital.

== See also ==
- Demographics of Peru
- Quechuan and Aymaran spelling shift
- Indigenous languages of the Americas

== Bibliography ==
- Adelaar, Willem F. H.; & Muysken, Pieter C. (2004): The languages of the Andes. Cambridge language surveys. Cambridge University Press. ISBN 978-0-521-36275-7
- Dixon & Alexandra Y. Aikhenvald (eds.) (1999): The Amazonian languages. Cambridge: Cambridge University Press, ISBN 978-0-521-57021-3.
