= Iquito language =

Zaparoan language of Peru

Iquito
- Native to: Peru
- Ethnicity: 230 Iquitos (2007)
- Native speakers: 25 (2011)
- Language family: Zaparoan: Iquito
- Dialects: Cahuarano †
- Writing system: Latin

Official status
- Official language in: Peru

Language codes
- ISO 639-3: iqu
- Glottolog: iqui1243
- ELP: Iquito

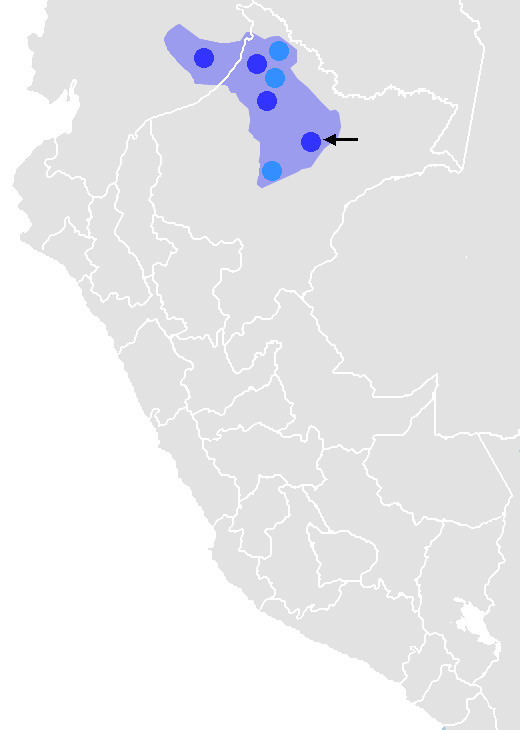
Iquito language

Iquito (pronounced [iˈkitu]) is a highly endangered Zaparoan language of Peru. Iquito is one of three surviving Zaparoan languages; the other two being Záparo, with 1-3 speakers, and Arabela with about 75 speakers. Three extinct languages are also considered to be Zaparoan: Andoa, Aushiri, and Cahuarano. Some classifiers also consider Omurano to be Zaparoan. Other names used for the language include Iquita, Ikito, Amacacore, Hamacore, Quiturran, and Puca-Uma, although Iquito is the most common.

Of the ethnic Iquito population of 500, as of 2006, there are 25 fluent or native speakers, all of whom are over 55 years old, and about 25 partial or passive speakers, all of whom are over the age of 25. Iquito is spoken in the Loreto Province, the regions of the Pintoyacu, Nanay, and Chambira rivers, and the villages of San Antonio and Atalaya.

It is technically an official language of Peru. There is a negative attitude towards the language in the Iquito communities and Iquitos mostly use Spanish. This is partially due to decades of pressure to assimilate into Spanish-speaking culture. The population is Christian; the Bible was translated into Iquito in 1963. The Iquito people cultivate yuca, are fishermen and hunters, rubber gatherers, and traders.

== History ==
This area of present-day northeastern Peru was settled for thousands of years by indigenous peoples. In the mid 17th century, there was a large group of Iquito speakers where the present-day city of Iquitos developed.

But, by the period of 1958 to 1966, only about 100 native speakers of Iquito remained, and they were on the verge of acculturation to Spanish. During this period, the population of older adults spoke Iquito and understood Spanish, middle-aged adults were bilingual in Spanish and Iquito, and children spoke Spanish as their first language and understood Iquito.

== Reasons for decline ==
Several factors have affected the decline in speaking Iquito; there are 25 speakers now. The infectious diseases of whooping cough, measles, and pneumonia had devastating effects on the speaking population, with a high number of fatalities. Also, the landowner system in place at the time, and the disruptions associated with the rubber boom and exploitation of rubber reduced the population.

== Revitalization ==
The University of Texas sponsored a program run by graduate students to help the population of San Antonio revitalize the Iquito language. They are working on a 1500-word dictionary and teaching plans in order to teach the younger population Iquito.

== Iquito Language Documentation Project ==
The Iquito Language Documentation Project (IDLP) is a community language revitalization effort to help revitalize the Iquito language.

== Phonology ==
=== Vowels ===
	Front	Central	Back
Close	i	ɨ	u
Open	a		

=== Consonants ===
	Bilabial	Dental / Alveolar	Palatal	Velar	Glottal
Stop	p	t		k	
Fricative		s			h
Nasal	m	n			
Approximant	w		j		
Trill		r			

Eastman, Eastman, and Powlison (2008) find labialized and palatalized consonants but do not include them as phonemic.

== Example ==
The Lord's Prayer in Iquito

Pwe sake niyakuxra kyaya cunya nayeunyu.
Kya niyakuxigha kanakiyu rikhi aniki.
Kya nakare zabane kana-nigwami ryeta namyani : yakukhira imakhira karamigwani. Mesyaka yakweno bwakhina keakaninon seike kanike semannikya nesivite. Kanevite nya kya kanivite.
Ikyaki katereke kya kivite, eka kinakare etinyu.
Kikamita numa sennui, zeke eke uyapa khinekhi keynanele. Amen

== Bibliography ==
- Beier, Christine; Hansen, Cynthia; Lai, I-Wen; Michael, Lev (2011). "Exploiting word order to express an inflectional category: Reality status in Iquito". Linguistic Typology. 15 (1): 65–99. doi:10.1515/lity.2011.004.
- Beier, Christine; Michael, Lev (2006). "The Iquito Language Documentation Project: Developing team-based methods for language documentation". Linguistic Discovery. 4 (1). doi:10.1349/PS1.1537-0852.A.303.
- Eastman, Robert; Eastman, Betty; Powlison, Esther (2008) [1976]. Fonoligia del Idioma Iquito (PDF). Datos Etno-Lingüisticos (in Spanish). Vol. 29. Lima: Instituto Lingüístico de Verano.
- Hansen, Cynthia (May 2011). Expressing reality status through word order: Iquito irrealis constructions in typological perspective (PhD thesis). Austin: University of Texas. hdl:2152/ETD-UT-2011-05-3447.
- Lai, I-Wen (May 2009). Time in the Iquito language (PhD thesis). Austin: University of Texas. hdl:2152/18441.
- Michael, Lev (2009). "Clause linking in Iquito (Zaparoan)". In Dixon, R.M.W.; Aikhenvald, Alexandra (eds.). The Semantics of Clause Linking. Oxford University Press. pp. 145–166.
- Michael, Lev (2011). "The interaction of tone and stress in the prosodic system of Iquito (Zaparoan, Peru)". Amerindia. 35: 53–74.
