= Cashibo =

Cashibo, Caxibo or Kashibo may refer to:

- Cashibo people, an indigenous people of Peru
- Cashibo language, the language of the Cashibo people
- Cashibo (mission), a Christian mission in Peru
