= Aewa language =

Language spoken in Peru

Aewa
- Tequiraca
- Aʔɨwa
- Native to: Peru
- Region: Puerto Elvira
- Ethnicity: Aʔɨwa
- Extinct: 1980s 2 rememberers (2010)
- Language family: Language isolate

Language codes
- ISO 639-3: ash
- Glottolog: abis1238
- ELP: Tequiraca

Aewa, also spelled Aʔɨwa, and also known as Abishira, Tequiraca (Tekiráka), (Note: Alternate spellings include Abigira, Abijira, Abira, Awishiri, Abixira Avishiri, Auishiri, Agouisiri, Avirxiri, Abiquira.) Ixignor, or Vacacocha, is an extinct language formerly spoken in Peru. It is presumed extinct some time in the 1980s, though in 2008 two rememberers were found and 160 words and short sentences were recorded. Today, most ethnic Aiwa people have shifted to Kichwa and Spanish.

== Classification ==
The little data available show it to not be closely related to other languages, though a distant connection to Canichana was proposed by Terrence Kaufman (1994).

== History ==
The last fluent speakers of Aʔɨwa in Puerto Elvira are thought to have died in the 1980s. Two people were reported to remember the language in 2008.

=== Language contact ===
Marcelo Jolkesky (2016) also notes that there are lexical similarities with Taushiro, likely as a result of prehistoric contact within the circum-Marañón interaction sphere.

== Names ==
Aʔɨwa has been referred to under a variety of names in the past, among them Abishira/Awishiri and variants, Tekiraka/Tequiraca, and Vacacocha. In particular, Awishiri is highly ambiguous as it has been used to reference no less than four different peoples and languages: the Aʔɨwa themselves, a subgroup of the Arabela people, who speak a Zaparoan language, the Waorani people, who speak a language isolate, and an otherwise unidentified group of Western Tukanoan linguistic affiliation during the colonial period. The name Aʔɨwa is the people's self-designation and the only one recognized by them. One of the consultants, Delia Andi Macahuachi, and her family members, thought the name Aushiri might refer to a group of "wild people" living on the Tiputini River, possibly referring to the Waorani. Günter Tessmann (1930) records that the "civilized" Aʔɨwa objected rather strongly to being called Auischiri, and the Sápara, who also speak a Zaparoan language, used the name Awishiri to refer generally to other Indigenous peoples, including the Chicham-speaking Shuar, other Sápara from the Curaray River, and Napo Kichua. Avencio Villarejo (1959) opted for the name Vacacocha 'Cow Lake', from the name of the location the Aʔɨwa lived at the time, now part of Puerto Elvira. The name Tekiráka was first used by Tessmann (1930) as he reported it as a self-designation by the Aʔɨwa, and has since been adopted by a number of other authors, although the Aʔɨwa consultants did not recognize the name as such.

== Phonology ==
=== Consonants ===
		Bilabial	Alveolar	Postalveolar	Palatal	Velar	Labiovelar	Glottal
Plosive		p	t		kʲ	k	kʷ	ʔ
Affricate			ts	t͡ʃ				
Fricative			s	ʃ		x		h
Nasal		m	n					
Tap			r					
Approximant	Central	v			j		w	
Approximant	Lateral		l		ʎ			

=== Vowels ===
	Front	Central	Back
High	i ĩ	ɨ	u ũ
Mid	e		o õ
Low		a ã	

== Vocabulary ==
=== Michael & Beier (2012) ===
Aiwa lexical items listed in Michael & Beier (2012):

gloss	Aiwa (aˈʔɨwa)
(my) husband	(kun) aˈʃap
(my) head	(kun) ˈhuti
(my) brother	(kun) auˈʃaʔ
(my) knee	(kun) kuˈpɨnu
1st person pronoun	kun
2nd person pronoun	kin
3rd person pronoun, demonstrative	jan
agouti	aʃˈpali
alone, single	iˈʃam
approach	jaˈsik
autonym	aˈʔɨwa
ayahuasca	lukˈʔãk
barbasco (fish poison)	maˈlahi
basket	ˈhaʔu
bathe!	haɾ kin tsuk
big	tuˈkut
big head	hutuˈluk
big-bellied person	aˈɾuh tʃuˈluk
bird sp. (woodpecker)	isaˈɾawi
bird sp. (paujil)	wiˈkoɾõ
bird sp. (partridge)	hũʔˈʃũlũ
bird sp. (pucacunga)	ɾoˈʔele
bird sp. (vaca muchacho)	kʷãˈʔũli
blue and yellow macaw	alkahˈneke
breast	aˈkiʃ
caiman	amˈhala
canoe	aˈtɾewa
capuchin monkey sp.	ɾũtɾũˈkʲãwã
capuchin monkey sp.	waˈnaha
cat sp. (tigrillo)	hũhũkũˈpãʔ
cleared path	tasˈʔãʔĩ
clothing	kuhˈpaw
coati	ʃakˈɾaɾa
come!	ˈsikʷas
cooking fire	asˈkʷãwa
corn	suˈkala
cotton	nuiˈnui
deer	atɾiˈwaʔa
earth	ahulˈtaʔ
eat!	iˈtakʷas
eye	jaˈtuk
firewood	wiɾuˈkawa
garden	tahaˈɾũʔũ
give	ɨˈwɨt
have sex	hiˈtʃinuas
here	ˈhiɾwas
hit	ˈpɨwas
I am bathing	kun inˈtsukwas
jaguar	miˈala
leaf	iˈɾapi
little woman	aslantaˈnia
little, a little bit	iˈʃikta
masato, yuca beer	nutˈnɨt
monk saki monkey sp.	kʷɨˈɾiɾi
mosquito	wiˈʃala
no	ˈtʃahtaɾ
non-indigenous person	ˈpaɾi
penis	jatˈhaka
pepper	aˈlaha
potato variety	jaunaˈhi
red macaw	milahˈneke
see	uˈkaik
snake	auˈʔek
squirrel monkey	siˈaʔa
stingray sp.	hamˈham
stingray sp.	makɾaˈlasi
sugar cane	raiwãˈʔãk
sun, moon, God	akɾeˈwak
tamarin monkey	aslʲaˈʔãũ
tapir	ˈsahi
tree	ˈau
white-lipped peccary	ɾaˈkãʔõ
?	niˈkʲaw

Table comparing Aiwa (Tequiraca) with Waorani, Iquito, and Maijiki (mã́ḯhˈkì; Orejón) from Michael & Beier (2012):

gloss	Aiwa (aˈʔɨwa)	Waorani	Iquito	Maijiki (mã́ḯhˈkì)
white-lipped peccary	ɾaˈkãʔõ	ˈɨɾæ̃	anitáaki	bɨ́ɾɨ́
tapir	ˈsahi	ˈtitæ	pɨsɨ́kɨ	békɨ́
collared peccary	iˈhaɾa	ˈãmũ	kaáʃi	káókwã̀
deer	atɾiˈwaʔ	koˈwãnʲɪ	ʃikʲáaha	nʲámà, bósá
red macaw	milahˈneke	ˈæ̃wæ̃	anápa	má
mosquito	wiˈʃala	ˈgʲijɪ	anaáʃi	mɨ́tè
(my) mother	(kun) ˈama	ˈbaɾã	áni, (ki) niatíha	(jì) hàkò, bɨ́ákò
(my) father	(kun) ha	ˈmæ̃mpo	ákɨ, (ki) kakɨ́ha	(jì) hàkɨ̀, bɨ́ákɨ̀
person, compatriot	aˈʔɨwa	waɨɤˈɾãni	árata ɨyáana	mã́ĩ́
(my) husband	(kun) aˈʃap	nãnɨˈɡæ̃ŋã	ahaáha, (ki) níjaaka	(jì) ɨ̃́hɨ̃́
head	ˈhuti	ɨˈkabu	ánaka	tʃṍbɨ̀
ear	ʃuˈɾala	ɨ̃nɨ̃ˈmɨ̃ŋka	túuku	ɡã́hòɾò
breast	aˈkiʃ	ɤɨˈɨ̃mæ̃	ʃipɨɨ́ha	óhéjò
pepper (hot or sweet)	aˈlaha	ˈɡʲĩmũ	napɨ́ki	bíà
cotton	nuiˈnui	ˈdajɨ̃	sɨ́wɨ	jɨ́í
leaf	iˈɾapi	ɨ̃ˈnʲabu, ɨdʲɨ̃	iímɨ, naámɨ	hàò
plantain	aˈlaʔa	pæ̃ˈæ̃næ̃	samúkʷaati	ò
corn	suˈkala	kaˈɤĩŋɨ̃	siíkiraha	béà
cooking fire	asˈkʷãwa	ˈɡɨ̃ŋa	iinámi	tóà
canoe	aˈtɾewa	ˈwipu	iímina	jóù
house	atˈku, atˈkua	ˈɨ̃ŋkɨ̃	íita	wè
firewood	wiɾuˈkawa	tɪ̃ˈnɪ̃wæ̃	háraki	héká
yuca or corn beer	nutˈnɨt	ˈtɪpæ̃	itíniiha	gónó
stone	nuˈklahi	ˈdika	sawíha	ɨ́nò, ɡɨ́nò
sun	akreˈwak	ˈnæ̃ŋkɪ	nunamíja	mã́ĩ̀
small	iˈʃikta	ˈɡʲiijã	sɨsanuríka	jàɾì
what?	iˈkiɾi	kʲĩnɨ̃	saáka	ɨ̃́ɡè
where?	ˈnahɾi	æjɨ̃ˈmɨ̃nɨ̃	tɨɨ́ti	káɾó
no	ˈtʃahtar	ˈwĩĩ	kaa	-mà
come!	sik, ˈsikʷas	ˈpũɪ	aníma	dáímà

== Sources ==
- Hammarström, Harald. 2010. "The status of the least documented language families in the world". In Language Documentation & Conservation, v. 4, p. 183.
- Fabre, Alain. 2005. Diccionario etnolingüístico y guía bibliográfica de los pueblos indígenas sudamericanos: AWSHIRI.
- Michael, Lev; Beier, Christine. (2012). Phonological sketch and classification of Aewa. (Manuscript).

Earlier lexical sources

- Tessmann, Günter. 1930. Die Indianer Nordost-Perus: Grundlegende Forschungen für eine Systematische Kulturkunde. Hamburg: Friederichsen, De Gruyter & Co. (112 lexical items)
- Espinoza, Lucas. 1955. Contribuciones lingüísticas y etnográficas sobre algunos pueblos indígenas del Amazonas peruano. Madrid: Consejo Superior de Investigaciones Científicas, Instituto Bernardino de Sahagún. (17 lexical items)
- Villarejo, Avencio. 1959. La selva y el hombre. Editorial Ausonia. (93 lexical items)
