= Pastaza corydoras =

Conservation status
- Least Concern (IUCN 3.1)

Scientific classification
- Kingdom: Animalia
- Phylum: Chordata
- Class: Actinopterygii
- Order: Siluriformes
- Family: Callichthyidae
- Genus: Corydoras
- Species: C. pastazensis

Binomial name
- Corydoras pastazensis Weitzman, 1963

Synonyms
- Corydoras pastazensis orcesi Weitzman & Nijssen, 1970

Species of fish

The Pastaza corydoras (Corydoras pastazensis) is a species of freshwater ray-finned fish belonging to the subfamily Corydoradinae, the corys, of the family Callichthyidae, the armoured catfishes. This species is found in the Amazon Basin of Colombia, Ecuador and Peru.

This species was first formally described in 1963 by the American ichthyologist Stanley Howard Weitzman with its type locality given as the Río Conambo near the village of Conambo at, 1°55'S, 76°51'W in the River Tigre system, Pastaza, Ecuador. The specific name references the type locality.

The fish will grow in length up to 6.1 centimetres (2.4 inches). It lives in a tropical climate in water with a 6.0 – 8.0 pH, a water hardness of 2 – 25 dGH, and a temperature range of 22–26 °C (72–79 °F). It feeds on worms, benthic crustaceans, insects, and plant matter. It lays eggs in dense vegetation and adults do not guard the eggs.

The Pastaza corydoras is found in the aquarium trade industry.

== See also ==
- List of freshwater aquarium fish species
