= Kakataibo =

Kakataibo may refer to:

- Kakataibo people, an ethnic group of Peru
- Kakataibo language, their language
