= Abira =

Abira can refer to:

- Abira (deity), a Peruvian creator god
- Tequiraca language, a Peruvian language
- Abira, Hokkaido, a town in Japan
