= Becky Soundy =

Salvadoran linguist and activist

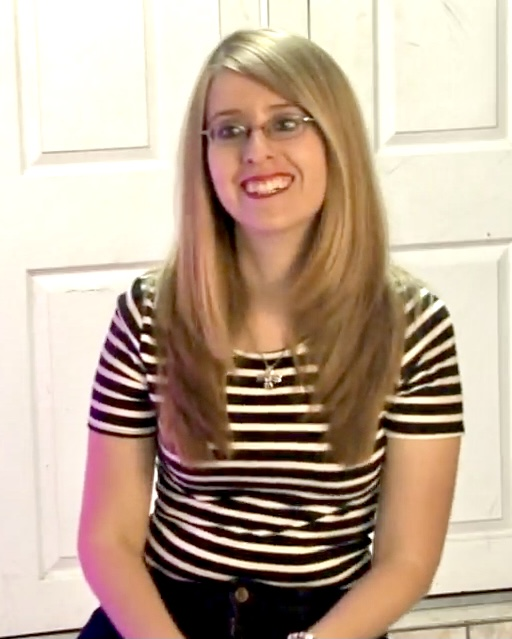
- Born: Rebeca Lourdes García Soundy; 11 April 1993 (age 32); San Salvador, El Salvador
- Occupations: Deaf educator, YouTuber

YouTube information
- Channels: Becky Soundy TV; LESSAvirtual; Becky Soundy; Educasordo
- Years active: 2017–present
- Genres: Education; entertainment; vlogs

Rebeca Lourdes García Soundy (born 11 April 1993) is a Salvadoran deaf educator and YouTuber. She teaches Salvadoran Sign Language (LESSA) and American Sign Language (ASL). Her channel aims to raise societal awareness of deaf culture and sign language.

== Biography ==
Soundy was born in San Salvador on 11 April 1993. Her mother Yanira is an author and lawyer. When Soundy was nine months old, she was diagnosed with profound hearing loss from a reaction to an antibiotic. She began her schooling in an American Sign Language (ASL)-medium school for the deaf. After sixth grade, she was transferred to a mainstream secondary school. In 2017, she graduated with a Bachelor's degree in Education Sciences (specializing in Special Education) from the Universidad Evangélica de El Salvador. In 2013, she gave a presentation to the United Nations regarding human rights for deaf Salvadorans. She is the first profoundly deaf Salvadoran to earn a degree in special education.

Soundy is the director of the Fundación Manos Mágicas (Magic Hands Foundation). During the COVID-19 pandemic in El Salvador, she started offering online classes in Salvadoran Sign Language (LESSA) while her in-person classes were on hold. She has also founded EducaSordo, a platform for deaf education. In addition to education, she has participated in working groups with other NGOs for human rights issues, including campaigns against trafficking of disabled people.

Soundy started a YouTube channel called "Becky Soundy TV" in July 2017 to raise awareness of sign language. She also has associated accounts on Instagram and Facebook. In July 2019, she became a presenter for Canal 12's morning show Hola El Salvador. She participated in International Week of the Deaf 2020 events held by Colombia's Radiónica and RTVC Sistema de Medios Públicos.
