= Deafness in El Salvador =

Though the information surrounding Deafness in El Salvador remains limited, sources estimate that there are between 48 and 88 thousand deaf people in El Salvador. The primary language used by Deaf Salvadorans is Salvadoran Sign Language, with approximately 15,000 signers. Other Deaf Salvadorans use a regional form of American Sign Language, Costa Rican Sign Language, or live in rural areas and use home signs. Education, interpretation, and government protection remains limited for Deaf Salvadorans, making it difficult for them to find employment and stability in Salvadoran society.

== Government Support for Deaf people ==
The Constitution mandates that the Office of the Human Rights Advocate maintains a standing panel of persons with disabilities, and the executive branch created the Secretariat for Social Inclusion position in 2009 to advise on issues of diversity, equity, and inclusion. In 2013, the United Nations Committee on the Rights of Persons with Disabilities published a report finding that the Salvadoran government was deficient in enforcing accessibility and protecting people with disabilities from discrimination. The committee found inadequate procedures for recording and punishing discrimination against people with disabilities and a general disregard for the forms of intersectional discrimination that women with disabilities face. Additionally, the committee reported a lack of reasonable accommodation in justice systems, an absence of economic and employment opportunities for persons with disabilities, and a lack of access and community services to low-income and rural populations.

Access to interpretation for Salvadoran Sign Language remains a significant barrier for Deaf Salvadorans’ participation in society at large, as the country had only 14 recognized interpreters as of 2018. Interpretation is available to Deaf people in judicial proceedings, and as of 2018, the Salvadoran Standards Organization has been working to revise accessibility standards for communications and web content. While the government is taking steps to support disabled Salvadorans, it does not provide a pension or financial assistance to people born Deaf. This creates an economic strain for Deaf people and their families, as they have limited access to job opportunities.

== Educational Access for Deaf Salvadorans ==
Historically, access to quality education for Deaf Salvadorans has been limited. There are 5 schools for Deaf children in El Salvador, educating 458 students. Of these schools, only one offers education from kindergarten to high school. Many Deaf Salvadoran students attend mainstream schools, which widely lack infrastructure and policies to support students with disabilities. In these schools, Deaf children are sometimes prohibited from signing and are instead required to vocalize and mimic spoken language, and are threatened with physical blows if they do not oblige. It is estimated that, on average, deaf students only complete education up to first grade. Previously, only one institution of higher education (the University of El Salvador) offered interpretation, but this access has improved recently as the School of Health and the Pedagogical University of El Salvador have increased the teaching of Salvadoran Sign Language.

== Deafness and Increased Risk of Violence ==
Despite the government’s attempts to structurally support disabled people, they are still at increased risk of harm from gangs. This risk is compounded for children, women, and LGBTQ+ people with disabilities. The rival Barrio 18 and MS-13 gangs control much of the Salvadoran landscape, enforcing territorial borders and patrolling areas with often violent force. Recent government crackdowns—so called “mano dura” or “iron fist” policies—have strengthened the gangs by concentrating members in prisons together.

Because of these mano dura policies, which allow police officers and soldiers to target and detain possible gang members, Deaf people are particularly vulnerable to violence by the state. Due to communication barriers, Deaf people can be confused for gang members, making them targets for security forces. In detention, they often experience mistreatment by guards and police. High rates of impunity and police violence limit the formal reporting of complaints, but most formal complaints filed by people with disabilities regard mistreatment by law enforcement. According to the Public Safety Inspectorate, the National Civil Police reported 30 complaints between 2013 and 2017. Of these, 16 complaints have been closed, 10 are being investigated, and 4 have been settled.

== Evangelism and Deafness ==
Numerous American and International missionary groups such as the Borgen Project and Wycliffe USA have taken special interest in the Deaf community in El Salvador. Several of these groups have founded missions, providing Deaf-accessible Bibles and church services to Salvadorans. As of 2018, there are at least 11 churches of various denominations that employ interpreters for American and/or Salvadoran Sign Language in their services.
