= Amadeo García García =

Last speaker of the Taushiro language

- Born: c. 1949 (age 76–77); Gómez Caño, Peru
- Known for: Last speaker of Taushiro

Amadeo García García (born c. 1949, Gómez Caño) is a Taushiro man who is the last speaker of the Taushiro language, a language isolate. In June 2015, he was residing in "Intuto on the Tigre River in the northeastern Peruvian region of Loreto." Zachary O’Hagan performed targeted field work with him on topics such as ethnohistory, genealogy, sociocultural practices, lexicon, and grammar of Taushiro.

Amadeo García García is probably most known for his ability to speak Taushiro, since he is the only one left who is able to speak this language. He cannot teach the language to his children because they live in Puerto Rico.

As of December 2017, government linguists from Peru's Ministry of Culture, working with Amadeo, have created a database of 1,500 Taushiro words, 27 stories, and three songs.
