= Corrientes River =

River in Ecuador and Peru

Location
- Countries: Ecuador; Peru

Physical characteristics
- Mouth: Tigre River
- Length: 500 km (310 mi)

The Corrientes River is a river in Ecuador and Peru. The Corrientes is a tributary of the Tigre, into which it discharges after a journey of 500 km.
