= Colombian Sign Language =

Deaf sign language of Colombia

- Lengua de Señas Colombiana
- Native to: Colombia
- Signers: 151,000 (2021)
- Language family: Andean?

Language codes
- ISO 639-3: csn
- Glottolog: colo1249
- ELP: Colombian Sign Language

Colombian Sign Language (Spanish: Lengua de Señas Colombiana, LSC, Spanish pronunciation: [ˈleŋɡwa ðe ˈseɲas kolomˈbjana]) is the sign language used by the deaf community of Colombia.

== Classification ==
Clark notes that Peruvian, Bolivian, Ecuadorian and Colombian sign languages "have significant lexical similarities to each other" and "contain a certain degree of lexical influence from ASL" as well, at least going by the forms in national dictionaries. Chilean and Argentine share these traits, though to a lesser extent.

== Description ==
The development of the signs have influences of Spanish sign language and American Sign Language. It is reported to have signs in common with Salvadoran Sign Language.

== Teaching ==
There are two sign language schools in Bogotá (the first started in 1929), two in Medellín and one in Cali. Countrywide, three different institutions of support for deaf promotes the learning of the language. The national Committee for the sign language promotes the research in the area, distributes the manual alphabet for spelling and the Grammar Dictionary and supports the organization for sign language teachers. The now defunct national central of telecommunications TELECOM distributed a CD-ROM software for self-learning.

== Relevancy ==
There is a growing interest for learning the sign language between the hearing people. Some schools use sign language in the classroom. Interpreters are provided at important public events, and for college students.
