= Ecuadorian Sign Language =

Deaf sign language of Ecuador

- Native to: Ecuador
- Native speakers: 50,000 (2021)
- Language family: Andean?

Language codes
- ISO 639-3: ecs
- Glottolog: ecua1243
- ELP: Ecuadorian Sign Language

Ecuadorian Sign Language (Spanish: Lengua de señas ecuatoriana or de Ecuador, LSEC) is the sign language of Ecuador.

== Classification ==
Clark notes that Peruvian, Bolivian, Ecuadorian and Colombian sign languages "have significant lexical similarities to each other" and "contain a certain degree of lexical influence from ASL" as well, at least going by the forms in national dictionaries. Chilean and Argentinian share these traits, though to a lesser extent.
