= Cahuarano dialect =

Extinct Zaparoan language of Peru

Cahuarano
- Native to: Peru
- Extinct: c. 1990
- Language family: Zaparoan: Iquito; Cahuarano

Language codes
- ISO 639-3: cah
- Glottolog: cahu1268
- ELP: Cahuarano
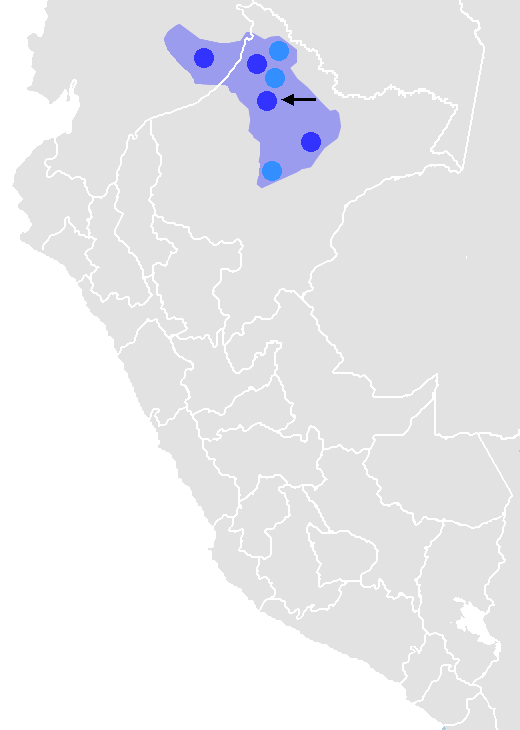
- Former Zaparoan language distribution, with Cahuarano pointed at

Cahuarano is an extinct dialect of Iquito, a language of the Zaparoan family, once spoken along the Nanay River in Peru. The last speaker died in the late 1980s or early 1990s. While considered a language by most scholars, it was considered by some to be a dialect of Iquito.

Its speakers, who were of the Moracano tribe, lived north of the Nanay River northwest of Iquitos. In 1930, Günter Tessmann estimated the language's number of speakers to be around 1,000, while linguist Gustavo Solís gave the number 5 in 1987.
