= Don i tison =

Mountaintop near Bafia, Cameroon

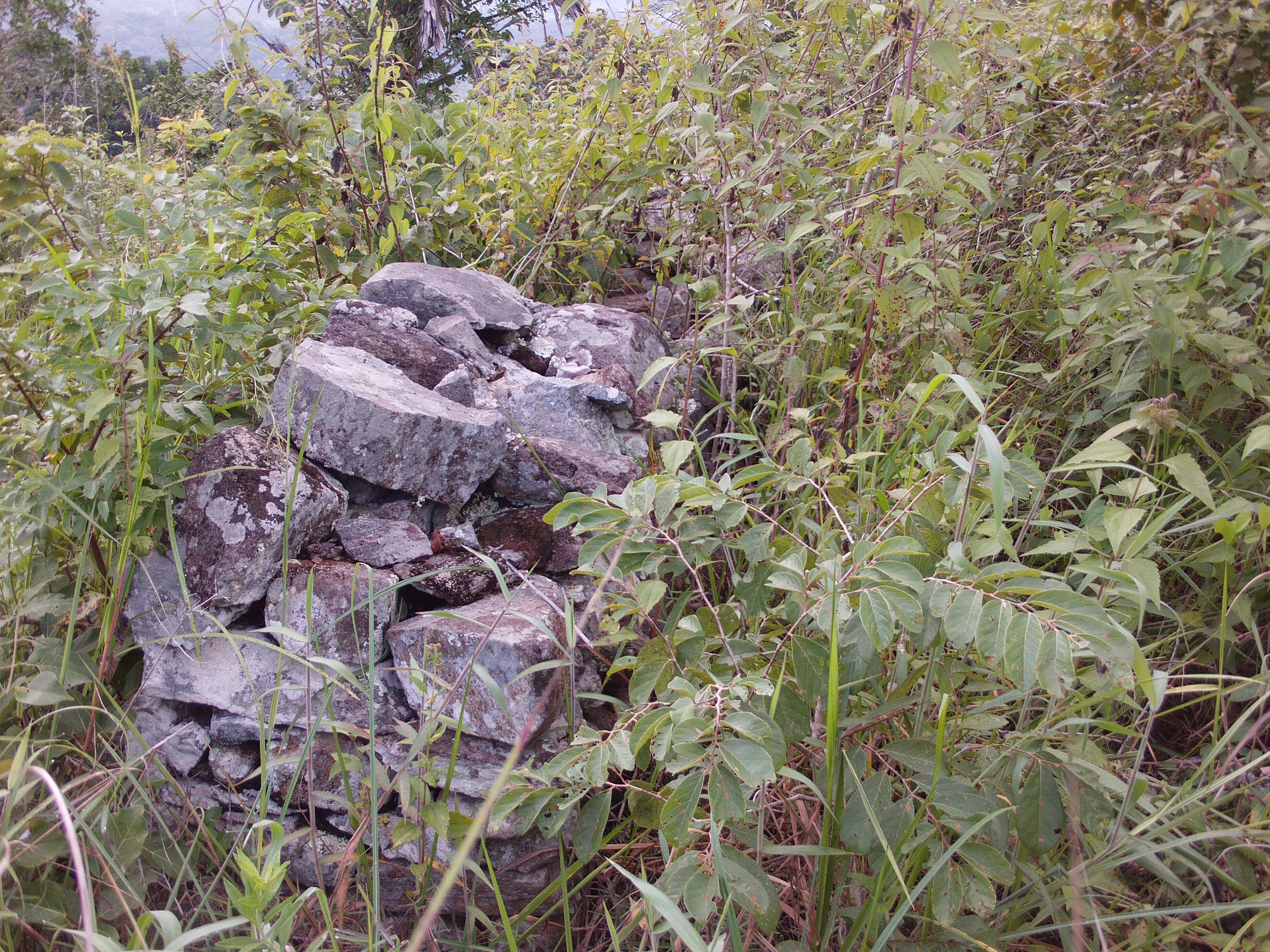
- Ruins of former German military post (1911/12) at the summit

Highest point
- Elevation: ca. 620 m
- Coordinates: 4°39′01″N 11°05′46″E

Geography
- Location within Cameroon
- Location: Cameroon

Don i tison (from Bafia: Town-hill) is the southernmost peak of a mountainous ridge west of the Cameroonian city of Bafia. The nearest populated place is Gouife.

In the figurative sense Don i Tison means populated peak. This comes probably from the fact that a German military base was located here from March 1911 to September 1912 during the Bafia campaign against surrounded populations. Some ruins from this period still remain. Most spectacular is a surrounding wall made from roughly-cut stone.

From November 6, 1914, to December 15, 1914, German ethnologist Günther Tessmann used the place as a base camp during his expedition to the Bafia people.

The ascent of the mountain is a part of the biannual Mbam'Art festival.

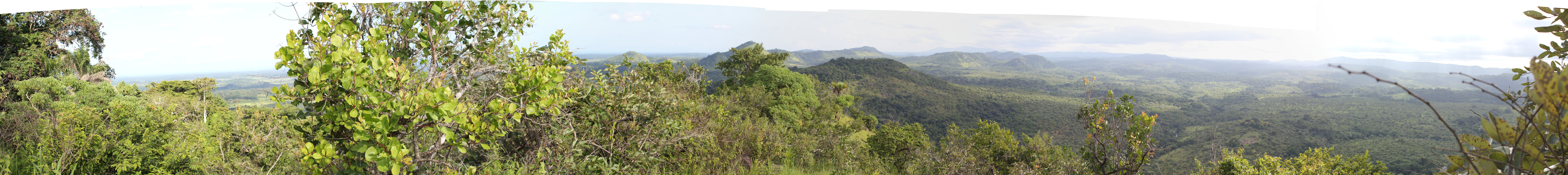
Southern panoramic view to the Sanaga plains from Don I tison.

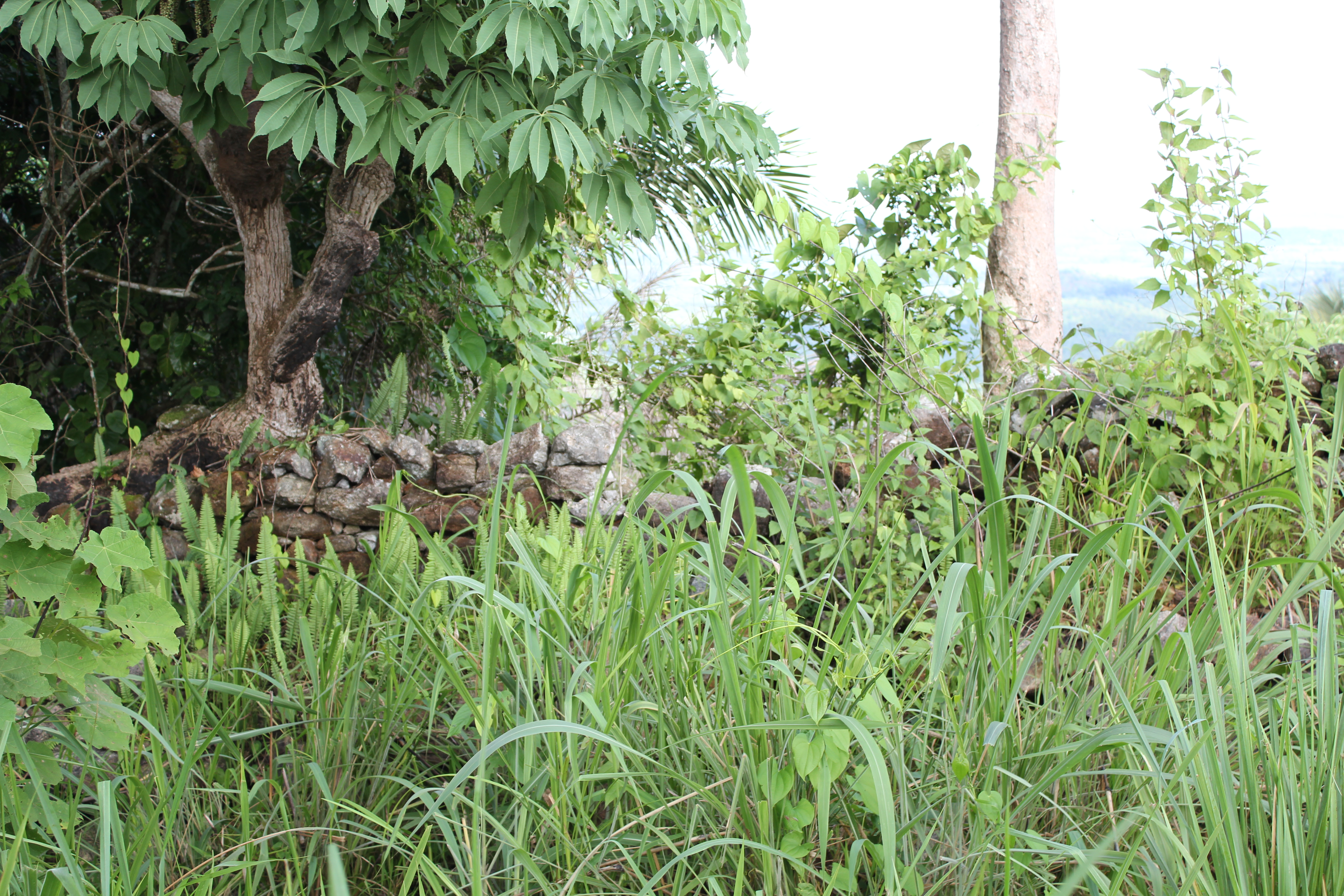
Eastern part of the surrounding wall of the inner section of former German military base.
