= Taushiro language =

Language isolate of the Peruvian Amazon

Taushiro
- Pinche
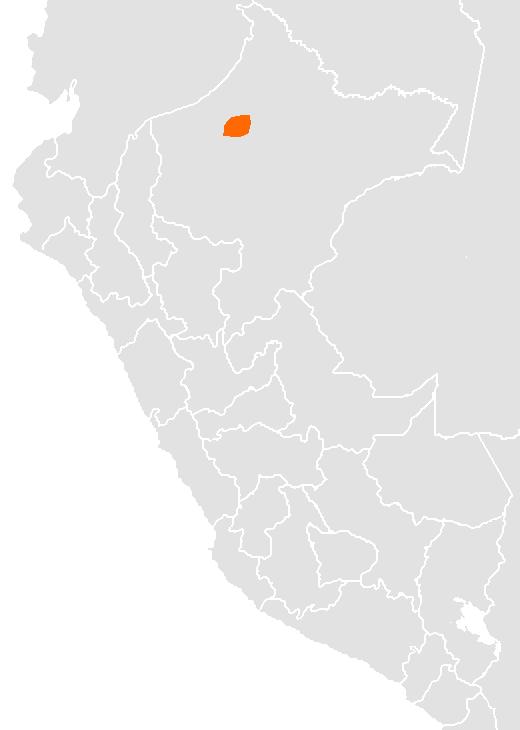
- Native to: Peru
- Region: Department of Loreto
- Ethnicity: 5 Taushiro (2017)
- Native speakers: 1 (2017)
- Language family: Language isolate

Language codes
- ISO 639-3: trr
- Glottolog: taus1253
- ELP: Taushiro
- Taushiro is classified as Critically Endangered by the UNESCO Atlas of the World's Languages in Danger.

Taushiro, also known as Pinche or Pinchi, is a nearly extinct language isolate of the Peruvian Amazon near Ecuador. The last living speaker of Taushiro is Amadeo García García. The language is poorly described, and was only documented beginning in the 2000s.

== Documentation ==
No documentation seems to have been made or survived from before the 2000s, including colonial documentation or in Günter Tessmann's 1960 work Die Indianer nordost-Perus. The first glossary of Taushiro contained 200 words and was collected by Daniel Karniš in 2001 from Czechoslovakia. The first substantial documentation was done in the mid-2000s by Nectalí Alicea Ortiz with SIL International.

== Classification ==
Taushiro is generally considered a language isolate, a language with no known relatives.

Following Tovar (1961), Loukotka (1968), and Tovar (1984), Kaufman (1994) notes that while Taushiro has been linked to the Zaparoan languages, it shares greater lexical correspondences with Kandoshi and especially with Omurano. In 2007, however, he classified Taushiro and Omurano (but not Kandoshi) as Saparo–Yawan languages. Marcelo Jolkesky (2016) also identifies lexical similarities with Tequiraca and Leco.

== Phonology ==
=== Consonants ===
Taushiro has 17 phonemic consonants. The only bilabial consonant in Taushiro is /w/, although it is analyzed as labiovelar by the SAPhon phonological database, thus lacking any labial consonants altogether. Phonemes with restrictions on occurrence are in (parentheses).

Taushiro consonants
| | | Alveolar | Palatal | Velar | | Glottal | | |
| | | Alveolar | Palatal | plain | lab. | plain | lab. | pal. |
|---|---|---|---|---|---|---|---|---|
| Stop | plain | t | | k | kʷ | ʔ | | |
| Stop | prenasalized | ⁿt | | (ᵑk) | | | | |
| Nasal | | n | | (ŋ) | | | | |
| Fricative | | | ɕ | x | | h | hʷ | hʲ |
| Affricate | | | c͡ɕ | | | | | |
| Flap | | (ɾ) | | | | | | |
| Glide | | | j | | w | | | |

/ɾ/ is restricted to grammatical morphemes. /ŋ/ only occurs in the suffix -ŋɨ and is only pronounced in careful speech, often nasalizing the preceding vowel instead. /ᵑk/ only occurs in the grammatical forms /aᵑka/ 'REL' and /niᵑka/. /w/ and /j/ have nasal allophones of [w̃] and [ɲ], respectively.

=== Vowels ===
| | Front | | Central | | Back | |
| | plain | nasal | plain | nasal | plain | nasal |
|---|---|---|---|---|---|---|
| High | i | ĩ | ɨ | ɨ̃ | u | ũ |
| Mid | e | ẽ | | | o | õ |
| Low | | | a | ã | | |

==== Nasality ====
Nasality spreads leftward within a word, only affecting glides /w/ and /j/.

=== Tone ===
Taushiro has two surface-level tones, high and low. The mora is the tone-bearing unit.

=== Phonotactics ===
Known syllable shapes include V(ː), CV(ː), and CV(ː)C, with /ʔ/ as the only possible coda. Words apparently must be at least bimoraic.

== Morphology ==
=== Noun phrases ===
==== Pronouns ====
Three persons and a first person inclusive are distinguished in independent pronouns, which have long forms, used as the core argument in verbs, and short forms, used to complement postpositions. Number is not distinguished for pronouns, with the first person exclusive expressed using the simple first person pronouns.

| | long | short |
|---|---|---|
| 1 | úì | ú |
| 1INCL | áì | á |
| 2 | íì | í |
| 3 | nácɕ͡ò | á |

==== Noun class ====
Taushiro distinguishes inalienable versus alienable possession, without any other noun classes.

==== Postpositions ====
Taushiro utlizes postpositions to indicate non-core arguments into a clause, most of which express spatial relation. Core arguments do not bear case markers.

Selection of Taushiro postpositions
| gloss | Taushiro |
|---|---|
| recipient | -ŋɨ̀ |
| instrumental, comitative | -ha |
| locative | -kú |
| locative | -wà |
| allative | -wɨ̀ |
| illative | -kúʔkɨ̀ |
| ablative | -wẽʔwɨ̀ |
| superessive | -kàné |
| adessive | -tàkɨ́ |

== Syntax ==
Word order in Taushiro is verb–subject–object.
