= Arabela language =

Zaparoan language of Peru

Arabela
- Tapweyokwaka
- Native to: Peru
- Ethnicity: 400 Arabela (2007)
- Native speakers: 50 (2002)
- Language family: Zaparoan: Arabela–Andoa; Arabela

Official status
- Official language in: Peru

Language codes
- ISO 639-3: arl
- Glottolog: arab1268
- ELP: Arabela
- Arabela is classified as Severely Endangered by the UNESCO Atlas of the World's Languages in Danger.

Arabela is a nearly extinct indigenous American language of the Zaparoan family spoken in two Peruvian villages in tropical forest along the Napo tributary of the Arabela river.

Also known as Chiripuno and Chiripunu, it is spoken by fewer than 50 people out of an ethnic population of about 400.

Since there are so few speakers of Arabela left, its speakers speak either Spanish or Quechua as a second language. The literacy rate for Arabela as a first language is about 10–30%, and about 50–75% for a second language. It uses a SOV word order.

Like all native languages in Peru, it has an official status in areas where it is spoken.

== The language and its speakers ==
Arabela is a language of the Zaparoan family of languages. Zaparoan tongues were once widely spoken in the rain forest of north-eastern Peru, but Zaparoan-speaking people have been decimated by diseases, wars with neighboring native groups, and by quasi-enslavement during the rubber boom. Most Zaparoan communities have shifted to Lamas Quechua or Spanish, while others have been incorporated into Shuar groups. The few surviving Zaparoan languages are all severely endangered. Among those, Arabela is most closely related to Zaparo (the only one still spoken), Andoa and Conambo.

== Current situation ==
The dominant languages of the area are Kichwa and Spanish, and they are both widely spoken by Arabelas. Kichwa has been the default language for native communities in the area since the rubber boom era, and has spread through trade mixed marriages. It is, however, losing ground to Spanish in the younger generations. The use of Arabela is restricted to a small elderly fraction of the population. The language is official per the Constitution of Peru, but this did not stop its decline. There is little written literature in Arabela. El Nuevo Testamento en Arabela del Perú, 2da ed. ©2008, La Liga Bíblica (the New Testament in Arabela) was completed in 2008. A publication of select portions of the Old Testament was completed in 2009. The language has been used in education by the Peruvian government, which has issued some school material in it. The Universal Declaration of Human Rights has been translated into Arabela in 1988.

== Dialectal divisions ==
There is no dialectal division among known Arabela speakers. A small group, called Pananuyuri, separated from other Arabelas roughly a century ago. Their fate is unknown but they may have survived, in which case their dialect is likely to have somewhat diverged from the other speakers'.

== Phonology ==
The Arabela phonemic inventory is quite typical for a Zaparoan language. It has five places of articulation and a vowel inventory of five vowels common within the family.

=== Vowels ===
Vowels
	Front	Back
Close	i	u
Near-close	ɪ	
Mid		o
Open	a	

- /ɪ/ can also be heard as a nasal [ẽ] when in nasal positions.
- /a/ can have allophones [a, æ, ɛ, ɔ, ʌ].
- /u/ can also be heard as [ʊ].

=== Consonants ===
Consonants
	Bilabial	Dental / Alveolar	Postalveolar	Velar	Glottal
Stop	[p]	[t]		[k]	
Fricative		[s]	[ʃ]		[ɦ̃]
Nasal	[m]	[n]			
Approximant	[w]		[j]		
Trill		[r]			

== Morphology ==
=== The noun ===
Arabela has no grammatical gender but for a few words, mostly describing persons, the sex can be specified by adding a suffix:

- Cua niya-nu: 'my son'
- Cua niya-tu: 'my daughter'

Arabela has two grammatical numbers, singular and plural. The plural is generally added by adding a suffix to the singular, the nature of this suffix varying according to the pluralized word.

- tia: 'house' yields tiaca: 'houses'
- maaji: 'woman' yields maajipohua: 'women'
- niyacoo: 'unmarried girl' yields niyacoojori: 'unmarried girls'

In a few cases, however, the plural can be formed through suffix substitution, or by using a different root altogether.

- caya: 'man' yields 'canuu'
- maanu: 'group' yields 'maapue'
- nucua: 'mother' yields 'nuhuocuaca'

A number of other words form their plural by removing a singular specific suffix:

- saijia: 'stone' yields sai 'stone'

=== Pronouns ===
Arabela has a complex pronominal system, similar to those of other Zaparoan languages and distinguishes between active and passive personal pronouns. Active pronouns act as subjects in independent clauses and as objects in dependent ones.

==== Personal pronouns ====
Personal pronouns
	First singular	Second singular	Third singular	First plural inclusive	First plural exclusive	Second plural	Third plural
Independent clause subject	janiya -nijiya	quiajaniya quiaa -quiaa	nojuajua -Vri	paa -pue paajaniya	canaa	niajaniya niaa	nojori
Independent clause object	cua	quia	na quinio	pa	canaa	nia	nojori na -no

==== Anaphoric pronouns ====
The verbal ending -no is used as an anaphoric. It can also mark the subject of a subordinate sentence when it refers to the object of the main sentence.

==== Demonstrative pronouns ====
Arabela has three kinds of demonstrative pronouns:

- noo indicates an object close to the speaker
- nio indicates an object further away from the speaker (Nio-te quia panishano—is it what you want)
- cuno indicates a contrast between objects or persons (cuno-cuaja cua sare—this is my dog)

==== Interrogative pronouns ====
Arabela has a rather restricted of interrogative pronouns, composed of:

- cana: who
- canapue: who (plural)
- casaa: what
- taa: how, how much
- taamueca: how
- tee: where
- teje: where from
- teyano: who, which

== Bibliography ==
- Dicconario Arabela—Castellano, Rolland G. Rich, Instituto Lingüistico de Verano, Perú – 1999
- Rich, Furne. 1963. "Arabela Phonemes and High-Level Phonology," SPIL I, 193-206
