= Aushiri dialect =

Extinct Zaparoan language of Peru

Aushiri
- Native to: Peru
- Extinct: (date missing)
- Language family: Zaparoan: Aushiri

Language codes
- ISO 639-3: avs
- Glottolog: aush1242

Aushiri (Auxira, Awishira) is an extinct dialect of Záparo, a Zaparoan language, spoken in Peru. It was spoken in the area of the tributaries to the right bank of the Napo River, in the Escuelacocha region.
