= Inmaculada Sign Language =

Deaf sign language of Lima, Peru

- Native to: Peru
- Region: Lima
- Language family: Andean: Peruvian–Inmaculada Sign; Inmaculada Sign Language

Language codes
- ISO 639-3: None (mis)
- Glottolog: inma1234

Inmaculada Sign Language is a deaf-community sign language of the older generations of deaf in Lima, Peru. It is clearly related to Peruvian Sign Language (LSP), but is distinct enough to be considered a separate language.

The language is used by people who attended a school for the deaf, CEBE La Inmaculada de Barranco, before about 1960, when LSP was established as the national language for the deaf. The school had been opened in 1939. Inmaculada Sign Language has about half the influence from American Sign Language that LSP has, and the manual alphabet is rather different.
