= Omurano language =

Endangered language isolate of Peru

Omurano
- Mayna
- Native to: Peru
- Ethnicity: Maina
- Extinct: 2006, with the death of Esteban Macusi <10 rememberers (2013)
- Language family: Language isolate (Saparo–Yawan?)

Language codes
- ISO 639-3: omu
- Glottolog: omur1241

Omurano is a language isolate formerly spoken in Peru. It is also known as Humurana, Roamaina, Numurana, Umurano, and Mayna. The language is only remembered by under ten people as of 2013.

== Geographical distribution ==
It was spoken near the Urituyacu River (a tributary of the Marañón River); as of 1964, it was spoken on the Nucuray River.

== Classification ==
Previous proposals have frequently linked Omurano with Zaparoan, though Fernando de Carvalho (2013) finds no evidence for this. Tovar (1961) linked Omurano to Taushiro (and later Taushiro with Kandoshi); Kaufman (1994) found the links reasonable, and in 2007 he classified Omurano and Taushiro (but not Kandoshi) as Zaparo–Yaguan languages. Maynas, once mistaken for a synonym, is a separate language.

== History ==
The name "Omurano" is first mentioned in 1743 in a letter by the Jesuit Juan Magnin. By the time of the Amazon rubber cycle, the Omurano had been severely reduced and began intermarrying with the Urarina, who had migrated to the area in the 19th century. By 1925, only 13 men, eight women, and three children, who lived on the tributary of Yanayacu, were enumerated by Günter Tessmann, who collected a wordlist of the language and published it five years later. In the early 1940s, the Omurano were decimated by a measles epidemic, completely wiping out the population on the Yanayacu. The language was presumed to have become extinct by 1958 from epidemics of measles and whooping cough according to a survey of the region by the Summer Institute of Linguistics, though this did not actually cause the extinction of Omurano. In 2011, a rememberer was found who knew some 20 words in Omurano; he claimed that there were still people who could speak it. Less than ten people still remember the language as of 2013; they were born between the 1940s and 1980s. The community has otherwise switched to Urarina, another language isolate.

=== Language contact ===
According to Marcelo Jolkesky (2016), there are lexical similarities with the Urarina, Arawak, Zaparo, and Leko language families due to contact.

== Phonology ==
=== Consonants ===
Omurano has 10 consonants, and, unusually, appears to lack velar consonants.

Omurano consonants
	Bilabial	Alveolar	(Alveo) palatal
Obstruent	p b	t	t͡ʃ
Nasal	m	n	ɲ
Flap		ɾ	
Lateral		l	
Glide			j

/b/ becomes [β] before /e/. Apart from that, no fricatives have been attested.

=== Vowels ===
Omurano has 5 vowel qualities. Nasal vowel counterparts are only present for [i]. Length is not phonemic.

	Front		Central	Back
	plain	nasal	Central	Back
High	i	ĩ		u
Mid	e			o
Low			a	

=== Tone ===
Omurano has two surface-level tones, high and low.

== Morphology ==
=== Case ===
Omurano seems to be a nominative–accusative language, as the direct object of transitive verbs is always marked using -ta.

== Vocabulary ==
A word list by Tessmann (1930) is the primary source for Omurano lexical data.

=== Comparison ===
Comparison of Omurano with other languages
gloss	Omurano	Taushiro	Urarina	Candoshi	Achuar
young man	ɾáwànà		enamanaː	kanugaasi	nátsa
lazy person	t͡ʃàtàné t͡ʃàtánè			wamiŋkaanuɾi	náki
scabied person	wìt͡ʃúmà			ʃaapi	mámu
white person	nàt͡ʃúɾì	nìjí		iŋkɾisa	ìŋkis
old person	bùɾú	jèjú	biːna		weámɾau
water	t͡ʃùá	wéì	akaʉ	kuŋku	júmi
manioc beer	t͡ʃùá	ahʲãnehoke	baɽʉe	kapuʂi	hamánt͡ʃ
agouti	pùɾìmá	wɨ̀ntɨ́	mami	punt͡ʃuwa	kãjū́k
paca	jàpú	àjáwà	it͡ɕa	maʂaaʂi	káʃai
collared peccary	t͡ʃàné	hùjóntò	ubana	kaʂuuma	jaŋkipík
white-lipped peccary	àné	tàjá	ɽaːna	waŋkaana	páki
dog	màɾàt͡ʃí màɾát͡ʃì	wànántà	ɽeːmae	tumuuʂi	jãwã́ã
spider monkey	bàbàné	àhú	alau	t͡ʃuupa	wáʃi
howler monkey	màɾìàbé	wàʔná	ɽuɽu	ʂant͡ʃiiʂi	jakúm
woolly monkey	lùné	àhúntù	aɽauata	t͡ʃuɾu	t͡ʃuː
deer	àlámàɾé	ùʔwéwì	ukwaːe	mant͡ʃani	hápa
tapir	làùtùmé làùtùmá	xèhí	aɽãla	pamaɾa	pamá
curassow	tátànà	éìntì	ataɽi	maʃu	máʃu
blue-throated piping guan	nàpít͡ʃù	wàhìnó	kʉeːɽi	wat͡ʃuɾu	kúju
Spix's guan	t͡ʃàùɾí	tèntá	enʉɽi	kaɾuntsi	aúnts
fish	màmá	éìnà	ate	kajupt͡ʃi	namák
manioc	jùné	àhʲã́	laːnu	kaʂinʂi	máma
plantain	pùɾá	àntá	fʷanaɽa	paɾantama	pánːtam
ayahuasca	ìjùné	ànùʔwɨ́	iɲunu kʷ aiɽi	ʂuɾuupʂi	natém
canoe	òpí	tɨ̀nɨ́ntɨ̀	enanihʲa	kanu	kánu
paddle	túnìt͡ʃà		kiha	pitʂi	kawín
blowgun	pìt͡ʃàná	ànètá	hic͡ɕana	ʃuŋkanaaʂi	uːm
I (1SG)	nàùɾú	úì	kanʉ	nu, nuwa	wi

== See also ==
- Maina Indians
- Extinct languages of the Marañón River basin
- Classification of indigenous languages of the Americas
