= Cashibo (mission) =

Missionary base in Peru

Coordinates: 8°23′19″S 74°40′04″W

Cashibo is a missionary base in the jungle of Peru, located near the city of Pucallpa. The name Cashibo is used both for the bases of the Swiss mission Indicamino and the base of the South American Mission, which are located about 5 kilometers apart.

The part of Cashibo that is referred to as the Swiss Mission is a base of Indicamino about 3 kilometers away from the main road, the Carretera Federico Basadre, which leads from Pucallpa to Lima. Indicamino is an Evangelical Mission that has worked for fifty years in Peru, Bolivia, and Colombia. The people working there are mostly European (Swiss and German), but there are also several Peruvian workers. The main goal of the Swiss Mission is to teach the Bible to different students from all over Peru, so that they can teach the Gospel to their own people. But at the base of the Swiss Mission natives can also get an education in the areas of carpentry, cattle breeding, and mechanics.
