= Conambo language =

Extinct Zaparoan language of Peru

Conambo
- Native to: Peru
- Region: Conambo River, Loreto Department
- Era: attested 1908
- Language family: Zaparoan: Záparo–Conambo; Conambo

Language codes
- ISO 639-3: None (mis)
- Glottolog: None

Conambo is an extinct Zaparoan language formerly spoken in north-eastern Peru, on the Conambo River in Loreto Department. Some authors consider Conambo a dialect of the Záparo language, while others consider it an independent language.

== Vocabulary ==
Conambo vocabulary
gloss	Conambo
tree	nakuna
mouth	pa-tupwama
dog	ar̥yaku
heart	ku-swaka
rooster	taꭓuka
water	mur̥itsiaha
forest	nisa
brother	mitsiaꭓia-wir̥imatu
forehead	pa-tur̥ga
leg	pu-eꭓyaku
day	tapagate
moon	kašikwa
hand	pe-kagwaka
mother	mamwaꭓwa
eye	pa-namiꭓya
ear	ku-tawer̥eko
father	pait-siaꭓwa
foot	pu-enakwa
hen	takar̥a
sister	mitsiꭓia-wir̥imatu
sun	yañagwa, yañakwa
head	p-anaka
belly	pa-mar̥ata
