= Sivia Sign Language =

Deaf sign language of Peru

- Native to: Peru
- Region: Sivia
- Native speakers: 12 native speakers (2015–2016); 15–18 proficient, plus additional learners
- Language family: village sign

Language codes
- ISO 639-3: lsv
- Glottolog: sivi1235

Sivia Sign Language is the deaf sign language of the Quechua town of Sivia in Peru. It is not related to Peruvian Sign Language.

The first generation consists of a deaf woman born in 1972, her deaf younger sister born in 1984, and a deaf friend of intermediate age. The second generation started in 1996 with the older woman's first child, who was deaf, and the rest of her and the other two women's children, all native signers, along with some additional cousins and friends.
