= Cashibo people =

Ethnic group in Peru

Cashibo'
Total population
- 4,000 (1999)

Regions with significant populations
- Peru

Languages
- Cashibo, Spanish

Religion
- traditional tribal religion, Christianity

The Cashibo or Carapache are an indigenous people of Peru. They live near the Aguaytía, San Alejandro, and Súngaro Rivers. The Cashibo have three subgroups, that are the Cashiñon, Kakataibo, and Ruño peoples. They mainly live in five villages.

== Language ==
Cashibo people speak the Cashibo-Cacataibo language, a Western Panoan language which is written in the Latin script and taught in primary schools.

== History ==
When first approached by missionaries in 1757, the Cashibo killed one of them and forced the rest to flee. They maintained hostile relations with neighboring tribes. They joined Juan Santos Atahualpa in 1744 in the destruction of missions. In 1870, Shetebo and Conibo people raided the Cashibo. There was a "decisive punitive expedition" against the Cashibo natives around the Pachitea River's connection with the Ucayali River on December 10, 1866. The Peruvian navy gunboats El Morona, El Napo and El Putumayo retaliated against the Cashibo there because they attacked members of El Putumayo when the crewmen disembarked to collect food from a native crop field. During the punitive expedition, women and children were captured and there was a massacre when around five hundred Cashibo men tried to attack the group of Peruvians returning to their gunboats. Hundreds of Cashibo men were killed from the gunboat's artillery.

Until the 20th century, Cashibo avoided outside contact. In 1930, they numbered 4,000 but their population was reduced by diseases. Simón Bolívar Odicio dominated the Cashibo from 1930 to 1940. Odicio was a Cashibo who had been kidnapped and raised by the Shipibo. He encouraged the tribe to open a road into their territory, which brought on non-native settlement and rapid acculturation, with devastating effects on the tribe.

In 1940, the Peru government offered the surviving Cashibos a reservation; however, they declined, wishing to remain in their own homeland.

== Bibliography ==
- García Hierro, Pedro; Hvalkof, Søren; Gray, Andrew (1998). Liberation through land rights in the Peruvian Amazon. The International Work Group for Indigenous Affairs.
