= Abira (deity) =

Creator god in the mythology of the Antioquia people of Colombia

Antioquia Territory

Abira is the creator god in the mythology of the Antioquia people of Colombia.
