= Kashibo language =

Panoan language spoken in Peru

Cashibo
- Cacataibo
- Native to: Peru
- Ethnicity: Cashibo people
- Native speakers: 3000–3500 (2018)
- Language family: Panoan: Mainline Panoan; Cashibo
- Dialects: Lower Aguaytía; Upper Aguaytía; Sungaroyacu; Nocaman †; San Alejandro

Language codes
- ISO 639-3: cbr – inclusive code Individual code: nom – Nocamán (retired)
- Glottolog: cash1251
- ELP: Cashibo

Cashibo (Caxibo, Cacibo, Cachibo, Cahivo), Cacataibo, Cashibo-Cacataibo, Managua, or Hagueti is an indigenous language of Peru in the region of the Aguaytía, San Alejandro, and Súngaro rivers. It belongs to the Panoan language family.

== Name ==
The name Kashibo and its variants are an exonym and are derived from the word kashi 'bat' and the collective suffix -bo. Most Panoan-speaking peoples did not have ethnonyms and were thus known by other names applied to them by other groups. This designation was first attested in the late 18th century in colonial documents. The Kashibo themselves have attempted to change this name as they find it offensive due to its connotations with their supposed cannibalism; the names Uni, meaning 'people' in Kashibo, and Kakataibo (and its variant spelling Cacataibo) have been proposed as replacements. A number of authors report that Uni was preferred by the Kashibo, though this appears to be restricted to those living along the Sungaroyacu River; even there, it has not been well established. Cacataibo has been more widely used and even appears in the name of the Kashibo political organization. This term originally designated a subgroup of the Kashibo, is most likely derived from the Kashibo language itself, and apparently means ‘the very best ones’.

== History ==
The Cashibo are first attested under the name Carapacho, derived from the Quechua words /qaɾa/ 'naked' and /patʂa/ 'belly', thus meaning 'a person who does not cover his belly'. Presumably the final -o in Carapacho is derived from a Spanish reanalysis of the original final /-a/ as a feminine marker.

== Classification ==
The Panoan linguistic family, to which Kashibo belongs, was first proposed by Raoul de la Grasserie in 1888.

== Dialects ==
Dialects of Cashibo are Lower Aguaytía, Upper Aguaytía, Sungaroyacu, San Alejandro, and the extinct Nokamán. Günter Tessmann distinguished three subgroups of the Cashibo, further divided into 18 clans. Tessmann distinguished additionally the Nokamán, who were subsumed under the Cashibo by missionaries; their language is evidently a dialect of Cashibo. It is closest to the San Alejandro dialect; the two are the most divergent dialects.

== Phonology ==
=== Consonants ===
	Bilabial	Alveolar	Retroflex	Palatal	Velar		Glottal
	Bilabial	Alveolar	Retroflex	Palatal	plain	lab.	Glottal
Plosive	p	t			k	kʷ	ʔ
Nasal	m	n		ɲ			
Tap/Flap		ɾ					
Affricate		t͡s		t͡ʃ			
Fricative		s	ʂ	ʃ			
Approximant	β̞			j		w	

The consonant inventory includes both a bilabial approximant, realized as [β̞], and a labial-velar approximant /w/.

=== Vowels ===
	Front	Central	Back
Close	i	ɨ	ɯ
Mid	e		ɤ
Open		a	

Kakataibo lacks rounded vowels.

== Statistics ==
The language is official along the Aguaytía, San Alejandro, and Súngaro rivers in Peru where it is most widely spoken. It is used in schools until third grade. There are not many monolinguals, although some women over the age of fifty are. There is five to ten percent literacy compared to fifteen to twenty-five percent literacy in Spanish as a second language. A Cashibo-Cacataibo dictionary has been compiled, and there is a body of literature, especially poetry.

== Sources ==
- Zariquiey, Roberto (10 September 2018). A grammar of Kakataibo. De Gruyter Mouton. ISBN 9783110416350.
