= Pintoyacu River =

River in Ecuador

Location
- Country: Ecuador

The Pintoyacu River is a river of Ecuador. It merges with the Conambo at the Peruvian border to form the Tigre.

== See also ==
- List of rivers of Ecuador
