= Peruvian Sign Language =

Deaf sign language of Peru

- Native to: Peru
- Native speakers: 10,000 (2017 census)
- Language family: Andean: Peruvian–Inmaculada Sign; Peruvian Sign Language

Language codes
- ISO 639-3: prl
- Glottolog: peru1235
- ELP: Peruvian Sign Language

Peruvian Sign Language (Spanish: Lengua de señas peruana, LSP) is a Peruvian language created and used by the Deaf community in Peru. It has been officially recognized by Peruvian law since 2010. It is not clear how many users there are in the country; the most recent general census registered little more than 10,000, but the more specific census on people with disabilities found around half a million people with hearing disabilities.

Variations exist in several geographically and among generations and religious groups, while the variety used in Lima is the most prestigious one. The government has tried to integrate deaf students into mainstream educational programs with no real success, resulting in low levels of education for deaf students. On the other hand, deaf social gatherings and private schools keep the Peruvian Sign Language strong.

== Classification ==
Clark notes that Peruvian, Bolivian, Ecuadorian and Colombian sign languages "have significant lexical similarities to each other" and "contain a certain degree of lexical influence from ASL" as well (30% in the case of LSP), at least going by the forms in national dictionaries. Chilean and Argentinian share these traits, though to a lesser extent. Clark counts the lexical similarities to Peruvian SL as Ecuadorian (54%), Bolivian (53%), Colombian (47%), Chilean (41%), and Argentinean (33%).

== See also ==
- Sivia Sign Language
- Inmaculada Sign Language
