= Tigre River =

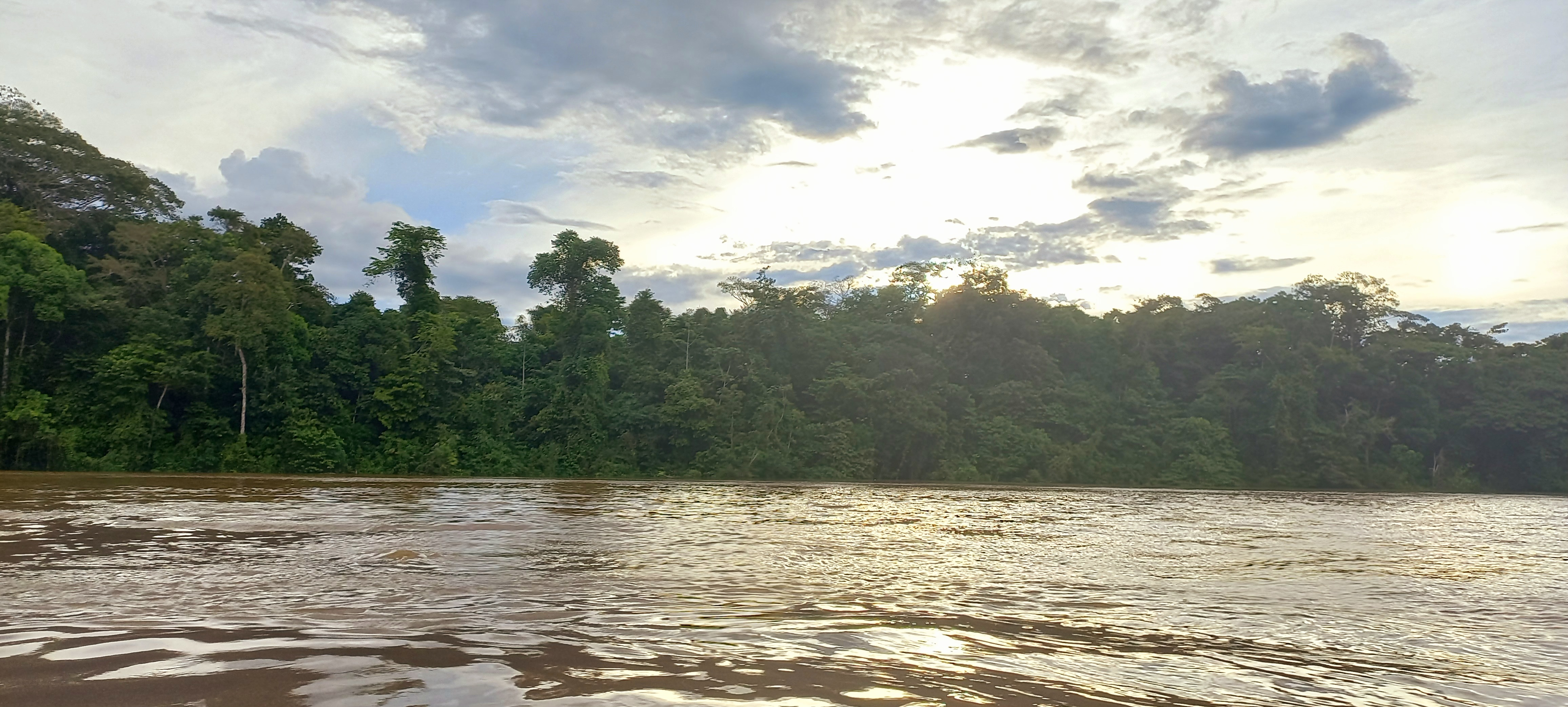

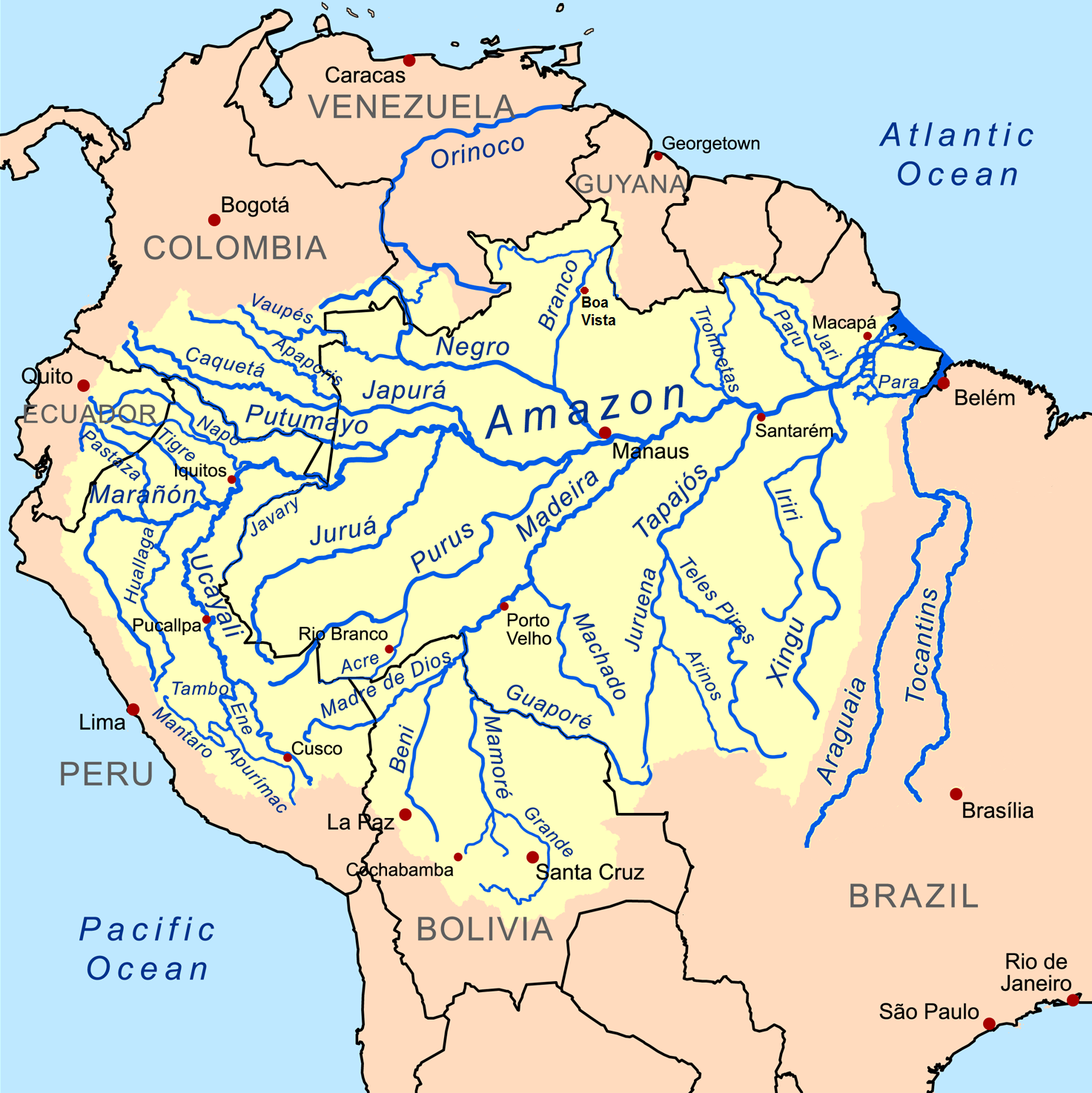
- Amazon Basin with Tigre River in the far west

Location
- Country: Ecuador, Peru

Physical characteristics
- Source: confluence of Conambo and Pintoyacu rivers
  - elevation: 510 m (1,670 ft)
- Mouth: Marañón River
  - coordinates: 4°29′7″S 74°3′59″W
  - elevation: 95 m (312 ft)
- Length: 920.23 km (571.80 mi) 760 km (470 mi)
- Basin size: 43,604.3 km^{2} (16,835.7 mi^{2}) 45,073 km^{2} (17,403 mi^{2})
- Discharge
  - location: Confluence of Marañón (near mouth)
  - average: (Period: 1965–2013)3,046.77 m^{3}/s (107,596 cu ft/s) 3,279 m^{3}/s (115,800 cu ft/s)

Basin features
- Progression: Marañón → Amazon → Atlantic Ocean
- River system: Amazon
- Tributaries
  - left: Corrientes
  - right: Tangarana

The Tigre River (Spanish pronunciation: [ˈtiɣɾe]) is a Peruvian tributary of the Marañón River west of the Nanay River. It is navigable for 125 mi (201 km) from its confluence with the Marañón. It forms from the confluence of the Ecuadorian rivers Conambo and Pintoyacu at the Peruvian border. Like the Nanay, it flows entirely in the plains. Its mouth is 42 mi (68 km) west of the junction of the Ucayali River with the Marañón. Continuing west from the Tigre along the Marañón River are the Parinari, Chambira, and Nucuray, all short lowland streams, resembling the Nanay in character. Tigre is Spanish for "tiger", the vernacular name in the region for the Jaguar.
