= Aguaytía River =

Coordinates: 8.05652°S 74.6445°W

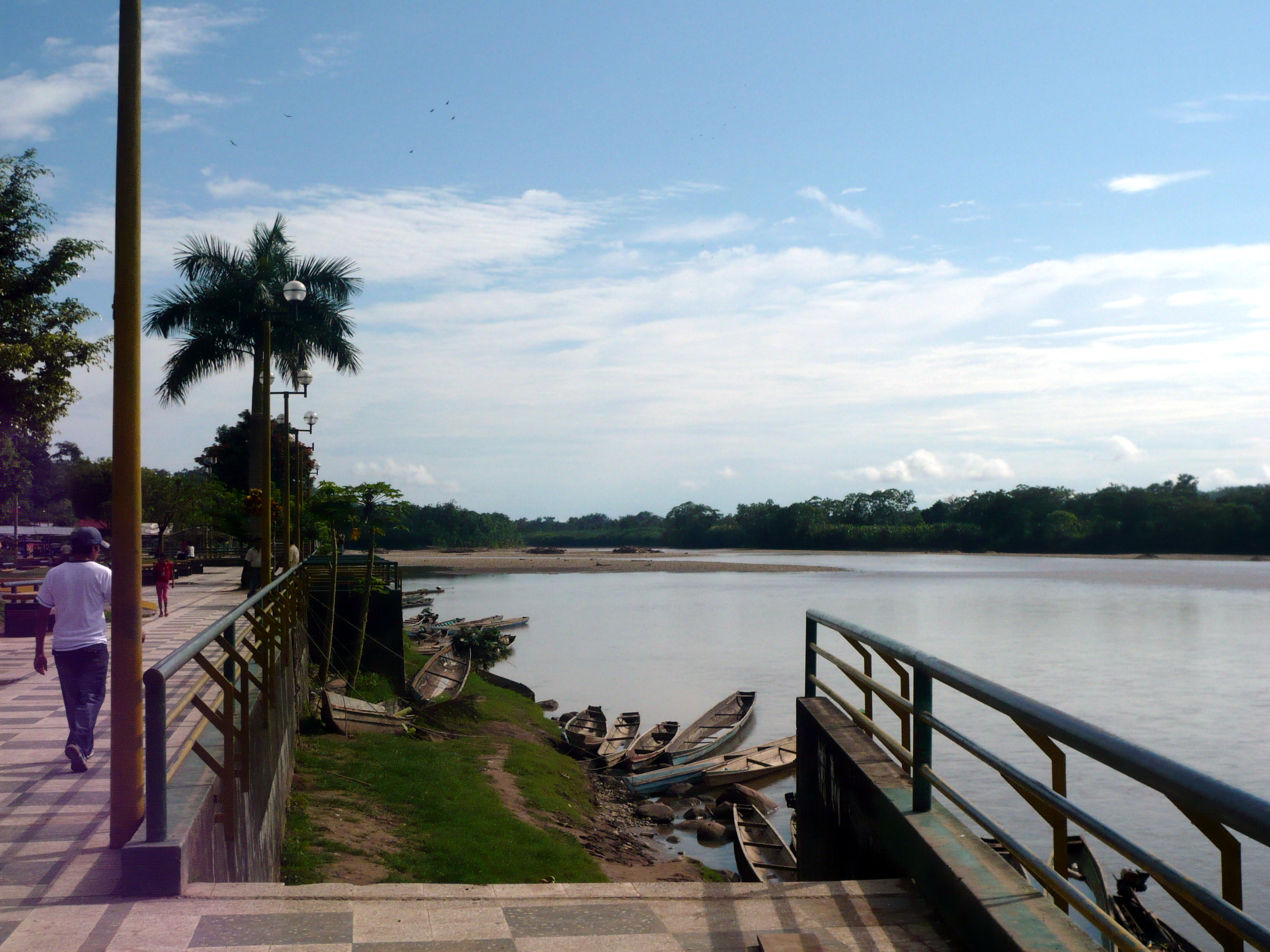

Location
- Country: Peru

Physical characteristics
- Mouth: Ucayali River
- Length: 350 km (220 mi)

The Aguaytía River is a river in Peru. It is a left-bank tributary of the Ucayali River.
