= Salvadoran Sign Language =

Sign language used in El Salvador

- Native to: El Salvador
- Native speakers: 26,000 (2020)
- Language family: unclassified

Language codes
- ISO 639-3: esn
- Glottolog: salv1237
- ELP: Salvadoran Sign Language

Salvadoran Sign Language (Spanish: Lengua de señas salvadoreña, LESSA) is a language used by the deaf community in El Salvador. Its main purpose is to communicate and is used by about 15,000 people, or 0.25% of the population. There are three distinct forms of sign language. American Sign Language was brought over to El Salvador from the United States by missionaries who set up small communal schools for the deaf. The government has also created a school for the deaf, teaching by means of their own modified Salvadoran Sign Language. The third type of sign language used is a combination of American Sign Language and Salvadoran Sign language. Most deaf understand and rely upon both. Their own unique Salvadoran Sign language is based on their language and is most useful in regular encounters; however, American Sign Language is often relied on within education due to the larger and more specific vocabulary. This is the reason that the deaf community within El Salvador sometimes relies upon both ASL and SSL in a combined form.

== Education ==
There is a formal school for the deaf run by the government. About every five years, government-hired teachers make their rounds to all the villages and small communities offering to care for and educate the deaf children. The parents may choose to not send their deaf children away, but then the children risk receiving little to no education.

== Classification ==
Henri Wittmann posits that SSL is a language isolate (a 'prototype' sign language), though one developed through stimulus diffusion from an existing sign language, likely French Sign Language. SSL is reported to have signs in common with Colombian Sign Language.
