= Conambo River =

River of Ecuador

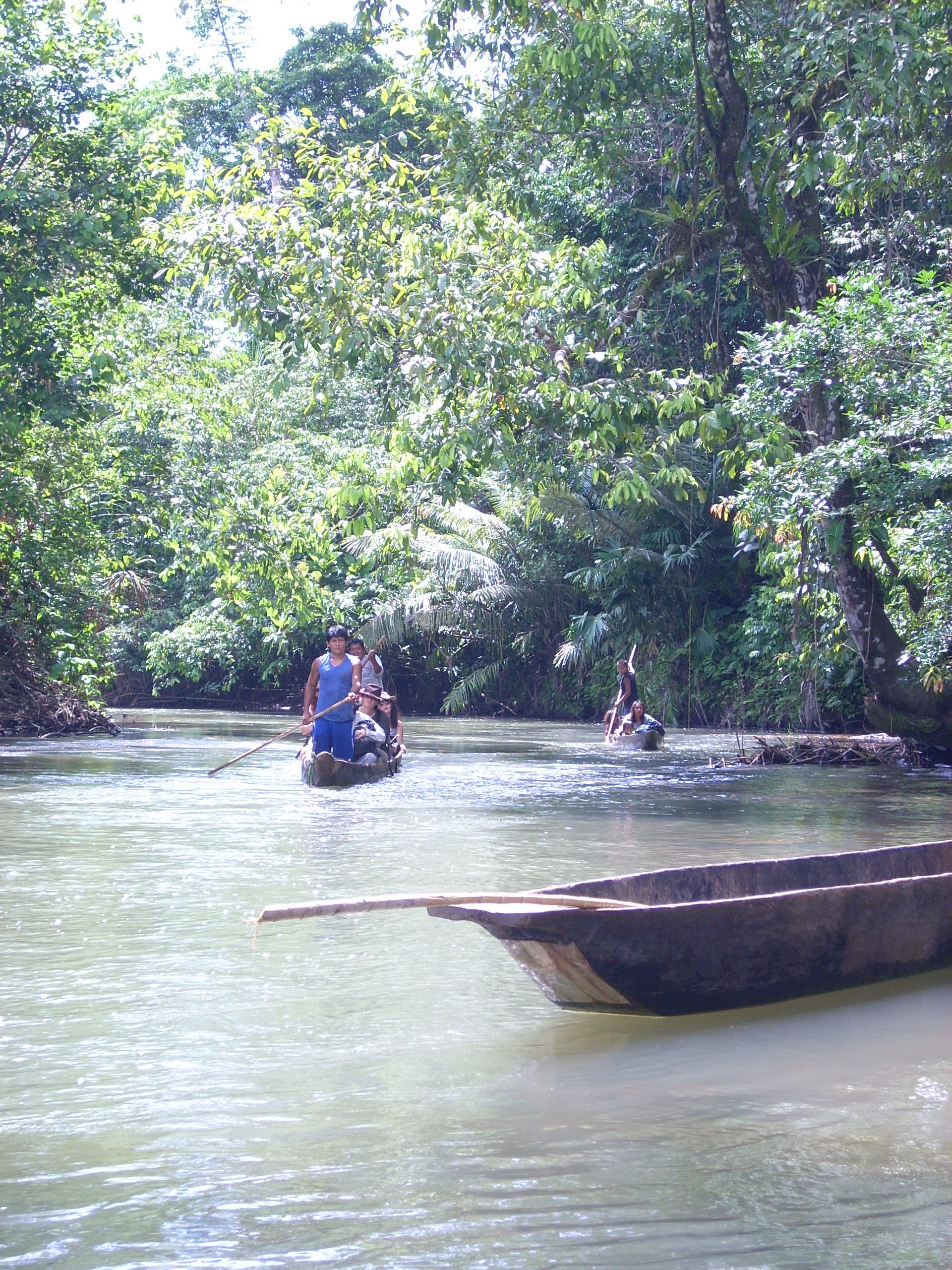

Location
- Country: Ecuador

The Conambo River is a river of Ecuador. It merges with the Pintoyacu at the Peruvian border to form the Tigre

== See also ==
- List of rivers of Ecuador
