= Andoa language =

Extinct Ecuadorian and Peruvian language

Andoa
- Andoa-Shimigae
- Katsakáti
- Native to: Peru
- Region: Pastaza River
- Ethnicity: Andoa
- Extinct: 2012, with the death of Hipólito Arahuanaza
- Language family: Zaparoan: Arabela–Andoa; Andoa

Language codes
- ISO 639-3: anb
- Glottolog: ando1255
- ELP: Andoa
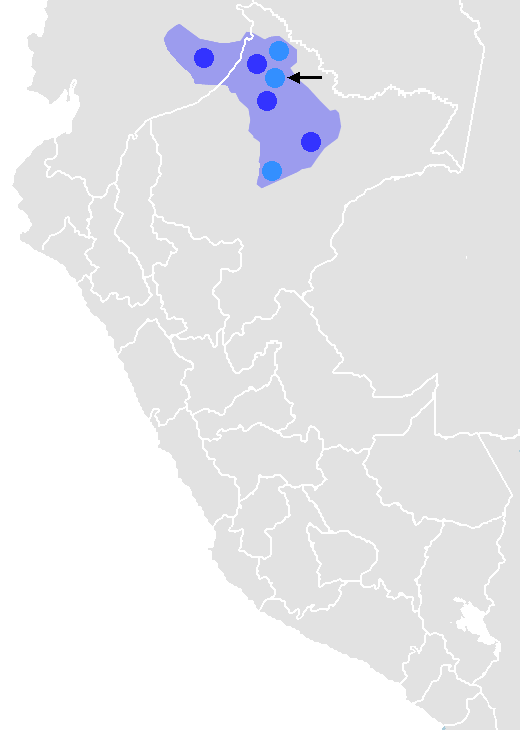
- Location of Andoa-Shimigae language

- Andoa is classified as Critically Endangered by the UNESCO Atlas of the World's Languages in Danger.

Andoa (Andoa: Katsakáti) is an extinct Zaparoan language of Ecuador and Peru. It was found in the Pastaza River region of Ecuador and Peru. It is also known as Shimigae/Semigae and Gae/Gay. The Andoa people have integrated into the Quechua and now speak either Canelos-Quechua or Spanish. The last known speaker, Hipólito Arahuanaza, died in 2012.
