= Záparo language =

Language from Ecuador

Záparo
- Sápara
- Native to: Peru, Ecuador
- Ethnicity: 200 Záparo (2007)
- Native speakers: 4 (2017)
- Language family: Zaparoan: Záparo–Conambo; Záparo
- Dialects: Aushiri †

Language codes
- ISO 639-3: zro
- Glottolog: zapa1253
- ELP: Záparo
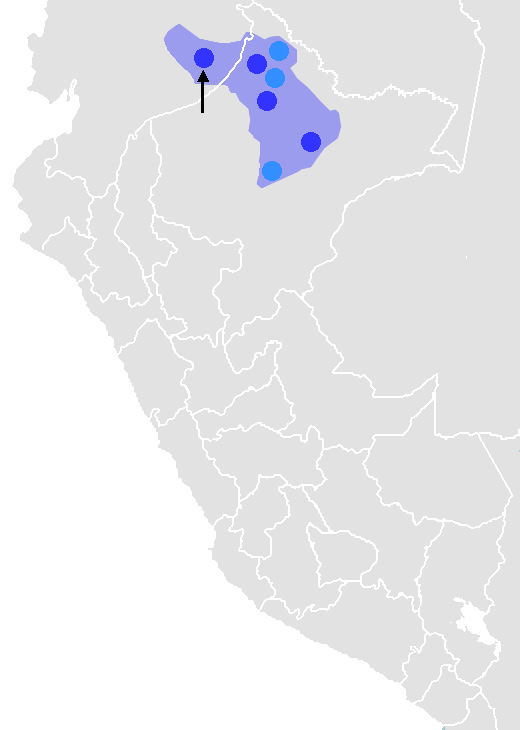

Záparo is a nearly extinct language spoken by the Sápara, or Záparo, people of Ecuador. As of 2000, it was spoken by only one person out of a total population of 170 in Pastaza Province, between the Curaray and Bobonaza rivers. Záparo is also known as Zápara and Kayapwe. The members of the Záparo ethnic group now speak Quichua, though there is a language revival effort beginning. Záparo is sometimes confused with Andoa, though the two languages are distinct. Záparo has a subject–verb–object word order.

== History ==
The Záparos were one of the most numerous peoples of western Amazonia, and it is thought the language was spoken by more than 100,000 people at some point. The number of speakers steadily declined after the arrival of Europeans under the effect of old world diseases and wars with other Amazonian people driven off by the progress of European settlement.

At the beginning of the 20th century, Záparos fell victims to the rubber boom. As with many Amazonian peoples, they were virtually enslaved and used as cheap labor to collect rubber. As a result, their communities were heavily disrupted, and their scattered members began to intermarry with neighboring tribes. The use of the Záparo language was progressively discontinued in favor of Quechua.

Only 150 to 170 ethnic Záparos remain today, most of them in the Loreto Canton, and all of them are Quechua speakers. Very few people have some command of Záparo, and those are elderly and isolated. The language is no longer used in everyday conversations, even though a language revival is currently underway.

Brenda J. Bowser, a professor of anthropology at CSUF, is working to capture the linguistic and oral history of the Záparo of Ecuadorian Amazonia with the help of a grant by the National Science Foundation. She hopes to fill a large gap in the understanding of the precolonial social and cultural history of the upper Amazon. The Záparo have also collaborated with Juan Casco, an Ecuadorian type designer, in discussing a syllabary system that facilitates in writing their language.

== Phonology ==
Záparo phonology is relatively simple, with only four vowels and 14 consonants.

Consonants
	Bilabial	Dental	Postalveolar	Velar	Glottal
Plosive	p	t		k	ʔ
Affricate		t͡s	t͡ʃ		
Fricative		s	ʃ	(x)	h
Nasal	m	n			
Approximant	w		j		
Rhotic		r			

- /h/ can be pronounced as [h] or [x].

Vowels
	Front	Central	Back
Close	i		u ~ o
Mid			u ~ o
Open		a	ʌ

- /u/ can vary between [u] or [o].

== Bibliography ==
- Moya, R. (2009). Pana sápara atupama, Nuestra lengua sápara: Diccionario trilingüe Sápara-Castellano-Quichua (Colección Runakay, Diccionario Escolar Intercultural Bilingüe de las Lenguas Ancestrales, 1.). Ecuador: Ministerio de Educación.
- Peeke, Catherine M. 1991. Bosquejo Gramatical del Zaparo, Cuadernos Etnolingüisticos, n°14, Quito: Instituto Lingüistico de Verano,
- Peeke, Catherine. 1962. "Structural Summary of Zaparo," in SEIL I, 125–216.
- Stark, Louisa R. 1981. "La lengua zápara del Ecuador", in Miscelánea Antropológica Ecuatoriana 1. 12–91.
