= Günter Tessmann =

German Anthropologist

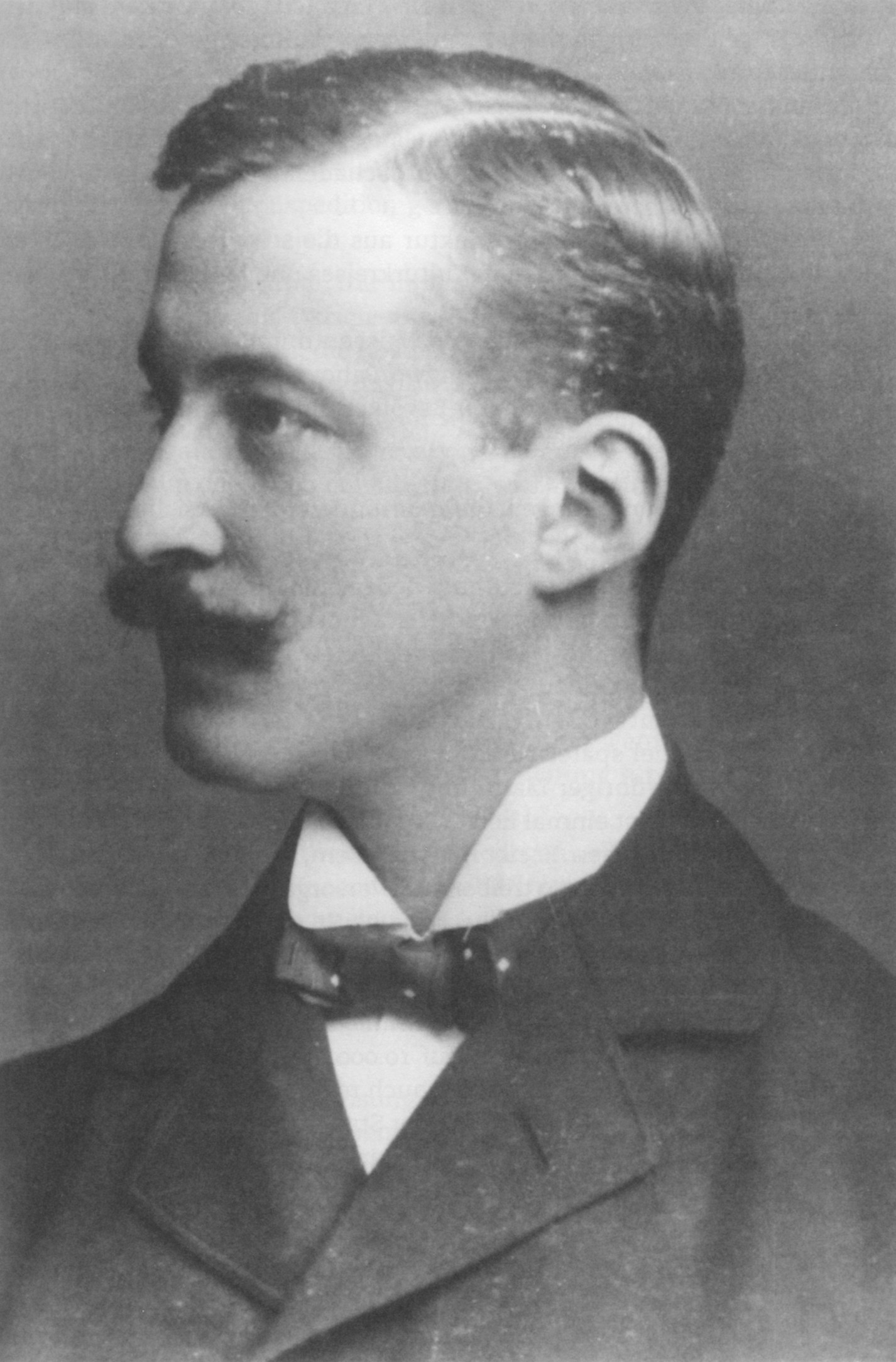
Tessmann in 1912

Günter Theodor Tessmann (also given as Günther Teßmann; 2 April 1884 – 15 November 1969) was a German anthropologist, explorer, botanist and zoologist who travelled in Cameroon, Gabon, Equatorial Guinea and Peru. He wrote a two volume work on the Fang people, Die Pangwe (1913), and another on the people of Peru in Die Indianer Nordost-Perus (1930). He also collected natural history specimens and cultural artefacts for German museums, particularly in his hometown Lübeck. A number of species were described from his collections including the plant genera Tessmannia, Tassmannianthus and Tessmanniodoxa.

Tessmann was born in Lübeck to businessman Theodor (1832–1924) and Laura Wöbbe. After school at the Lübeck Katharineum he apprenticed in tropical gardening at Witzenhausen. He travelled to Cameroon to work in a cocoa plantation in 1902. The Lübeck museum supported him to study the local people from 1907 to 1909. He also collected specimens and artefacts for the museum in Lübeck. In 1913 he published a two volume monograph Die Pangwe that described the Fang people. In 1914 Tessmann spent over a month on Don i tison. In 1923 he visited Peru and in 1930 he wrote Die Indianer Nordost-Perus and in the same year received a degree from the University of Rostock. Many species of plants and animals were described from his collections including the butterfly Bebearia tessmanni. In 1936, he was banned from teaching at the University of Halle by the Nazi regime and he moved to Brazil where he worked as a botanist at the Museu Paranaense and the Instituto de Biologia. He visited Germany once in 1955 and retired in 1958. He died in Curitiba in 1969.
