= Iskonawa language =

Indigenous American language

Isconahua
- Iskonawa
- Native to: Peru, Brazil
- Ethnicity: >100 Isconahua (2023)
- Native speakers: 1 (2023)
- Language family: Panoan: Mainline Panoan; Nawa; Poyanawa; Isconahua

Language codes
- ISO 639-3: isc
- Glottolog: isco1239
- ELP: Isconahua

Isconahua is an indigenous American language of the Panoan family. It is spoken by the Isconahua prople in Peru. The Isconahua, of which over 100 people identified as in 2023, were a very isolated group as of 2008 and has very little contact with the outside world. In spite of this, as of 2023, the language is spoken by only one person, Nawa Nika (Nelita Campos), when language preservation efforts were reported to be underway.

It has an official alphabet approved by the Ministry of Education of Peru.

== History ==
During the 19th and 20th centuries, the Iskonawa are thought to have retreated into the forest after their numbers were drastically reduced during the Amazon rubber cycle. In 1959, when they were contacted again by American missionaries, who settled them in a village, there were 100 Iskonawa. The linguist Roberto Zariquiey has conducted fieldwork on Iskonawa. As of 2023, only one speaker of Iskonawa remains, Nawa Niká or Nelita Campos. Zariquiey has creates apps to teach Iskonawa from the data collected from Campos, and they have become very popular in Callería, and has launched a school to teach young Iskonawas the language. Campos has also encouraged children to learn the language.

== Classification ==
Iskonawa is a Panoan language. David Fleck (2013) classifies it with Poyanawa, Nukini, Náwa, and the extinct Remo language of the Jaquirana River. He specifically notes that it is very similar to Poyanawa, but also has similarities with Shipibo-Capanahua and Amahuaca.

== Phonology ==
Letters of the official alphabet are given in ⟨brackets⟩.

=== Consonants ===
Iskonawa consonants
	Bilabial	Alveolar	Palatal	Velar	Glottal
Occlusive	p	t		k	
Nasal	m	n			
Vibrant		ɾ ⟨r⟩			
Affricate		ts	tʃ ⟨ch⟩		
Fricative		s	ʃ ⟨sh⟩		h
Approximant	β ⟨b⟩ w		j ⟨y⟩		

=== Vowels ===
Iskonawa vowels
	Front	Central	Back
Close	i	ɨ ⟨e⟩	u ⟨o⟩
Open		a	
