= Amahuaca language =

Panoan language spoken in Peru and Brazil

Amahuaca
- Yora
- Native to: Peru, Brazil
- Ethnicity: Amahuaca
- Native speakers: (520 cited 1995–2007)
- Language family: Panoan: Mainline; Nawa group; Headwaters subgroup; Amahuaca

Language codes
- ISO 639-3: amc
- Glottolog: amah1246
- ELP: Amahuaca
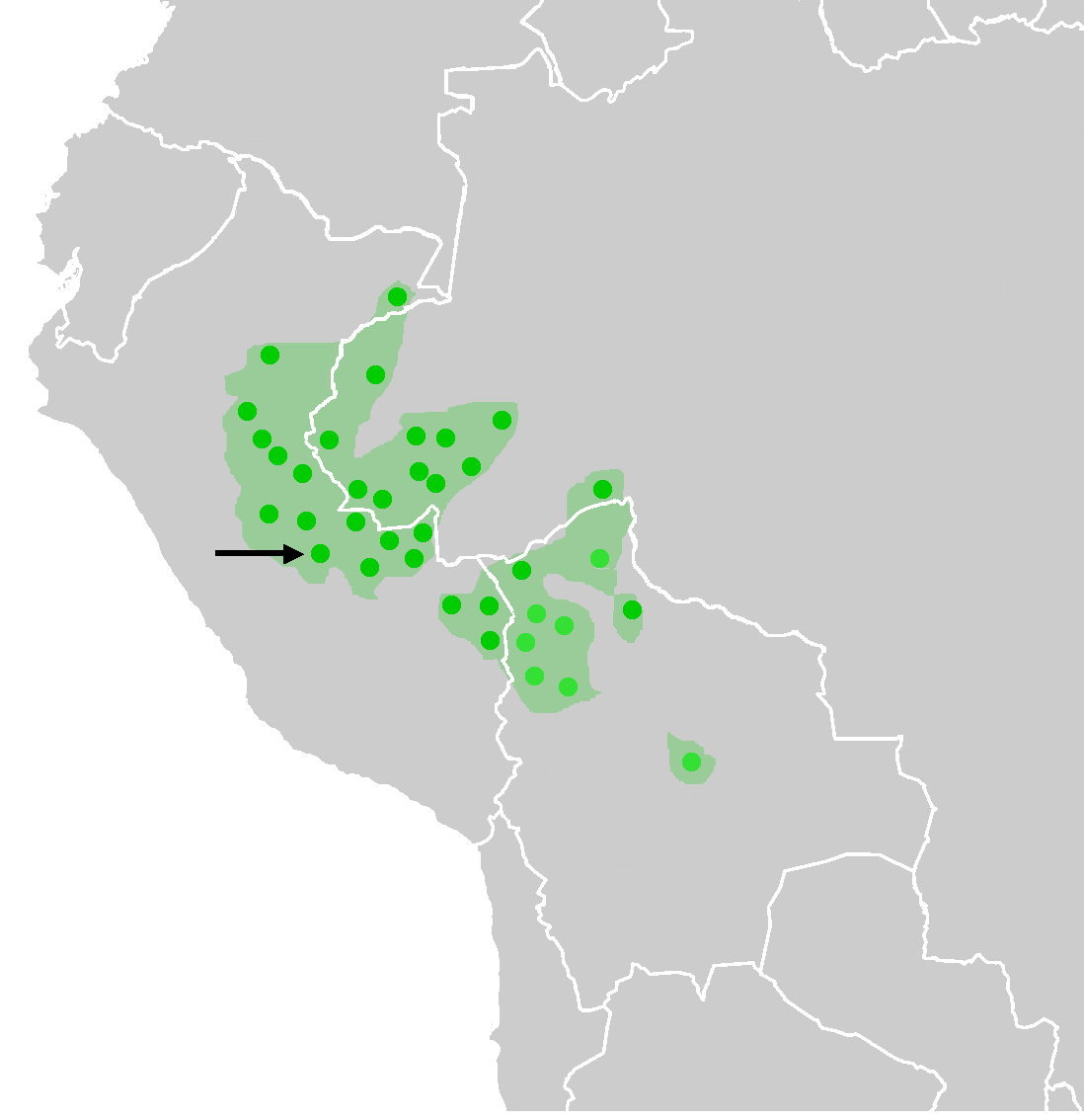
- Map of Amawaca among the Pano-Tacanan languages

Amahuaca is an indigenous language of the Amazon Basin in Peru and Brazil. It is also known as Amawaka, Amaguaco, Ameuhaque, Ipitineri, and Sayaco. Amahuaca is a Panoan language that is believed to be closely related to Cashinahua and Yaminawa. There around 220 speakers in Brazil, and around 328 speakers in Peru.

== History ==
The Amahuaca people were first contacted by Franciscan missionaries in 1686. They were formerly hostile to other groups in the area and sometimes attacked them in raids. Even after the Amazon rubber cycle, which resulted in numerous deaths of Indigenous people in the region, the Amahuaca were still fairly numerous. However, conflict with other groups, such as the Yine, Shipibo, and Yaminawá, greatly reduced their numbers. Beginning in the 1960s, the Amahuaca began to move near Spanish-speaking mestizo communities, and gradually began to assimilate into their culture. More and more Amahuaca speakers, as a result, are becoming bilingual with Spanish. The Amahuaca language is now endangered and poised to become extinct in the near future.

== Classification ==
Amahuaca is a member of the Panoan language family. David Fleck (2013) groups Amahuaca as being closest to the extinct Remo language of the Môa river and Tuxinawa, and the still-spoken Kashinawa and Yaminawa dialect complex, which also includes Sharanawa, Shanenawa, Yora, and Yawanawa.

== Phonology ==
Vowels of Amahuaca
	Front		Central		Back	
	plain	nasal	plain	nasal	plain	nasal
Close	i	ĩ	ɨ	ɨ̃		
Close-mid					o	õ
Open	a	ã				

Consonants of Amahuaca
	Bilabial	Alveolar	Palatal	Velar	Glottal
Nasal	m	n			
Plosive	p	t		k	ʔ
Fricative		s	ʃ	x	h
Approximant			j		
Tap/flap		ɾ			

== Writing system ==
30% of Amahuaca speakers are literate in Amahuaca and 50% are literate in Spanish. Amahuaca uses a Latin-based script. There are some bilingual schools. A dictionary has been developed along with a grammatical description and bible portions.

== See also ==
- Amhuaca people
