= Korubo =

Indigenous people of Brazil

Coordinates: 04°39′02″S 70°15′42″W

Dslala

Regions with significant populations
- Brazil (Amazonas)

Languages
- Korubo language

The Korubo or Korubu, also known by the endonym Dslala and in Portuguese as caceteiros ('clubbers'), are a largely uncontacted, Panoan-speaking Indigenous people of Brazil living in the lower Vale do Javari in the western Amazon Basin. Much of what the outside world knows of this group is based on the research of Brazilian explorer Sydney Possuelo, who first contacted the tribe in October 1996, and journalist Paul Raffaele.

== Region ==
The Flecheiros live in the far west of Brazil, in the Vale do Javari Indigenous Territory, an area covering 83,000 square kilometres (32,000 sq mi). Access to the Vale do Javari Indigenous Territory is limited by the government of Brazil to protect the Indigenous groups inhabiting the area and the environment on which they depend for their traditional lifeways from exploitation by loggers, miners, poachers, drug traffickers and others. Several other Indigenous peoples live in this territory, including the Kanamari and the Tsohom Djapa, who speak languages in the Katukina family, the Matis, the Marubo, the Kulina Pano and the Matses or Mayoruna, who speak Panoan languages like the Korubo. The region is also home to certain other groups of uncontacted peoples. Contact with uncontacted peoples is prohibited by the government of Brazil, even with respect to other Indigenous groups living traditional lifeways, but state capacity is low in these areas and monitoring or enforcement is difficult.

== History ==
As early as the 1920s, clashes between rubber tappers and the Korubo led to violence. Logging and other economic activity along the Itui river in the 1960s precipitated a series of violent clashes with the Korubo which caused Brazil's FUNAI to initiate contact in the early 1970s. Contact was difficult to establish and the agency lost seven civil servants in attempts to establish a peaceful relation with them, including FUNAI member (and close friend of Sydney Possuelo) Raimundo (Sobral) Batista Magalhães, on August 22, 1997 by Korubo warrior Ta'avan. Sobral was attempting to take back a tarpaulin stolen by the Korubo.

A dispute between about 20 members and the main tribe caused the two bands to separate. Soon after it broke away from the larger Korubo, the splinter group was chased away by the settlers of Lodario, killing two members. Led by a warrior Ta'avan, the Korubo later killed three loggers.

Despite FUNAI's efforts, the main tribe continues to be in complete isolation, but whereas the smaller band of Korubo were successfully contacted in 1996 and have frequent interaction with neighbouring settlements and FUNAI employees.

FUNAI's policy since the 1980s has been to minimize contact with otherwise voluntarily isolated indigenous tribes. "Uncontacted" as a label can be misleading, with some scholars and activists preferring the description "living in voluntary isolation". The Korubo have experience with recognizing non-indigenous people, and weapons and are generally hostile to interlopers. They are, however, likely to be immunologically naive.

Access to the Vale do Javari Indigenous Territory is limited to protect the indigenous groups inhabiting the area and the environment on which they depend for their traditional lifeways from exploitation by loggers, miners, poachers, drug traffickers and others. Several other indigenous peoples live in this territory, including the Kanamari and the Tsohom Djapa, who speak languages in the Katukina family, the Marubo, the Kulina Pano, the Matis and the Matses or Mayoruna, who speak Panoan languages like the Korubo. The region is also home to certain other groups of uncontacted peoples.

FUNAI helps the contacted portion of the Korubo by providing vaccines, antimalarial medication and other services.

In 2014/2015, a conflict between the Matis and the Korubo resulted in two Matis fatalities and seven to fifteen Korubo fatalities.

Population figures of the main tribe are unknown but estimated from aerial reconnaissance of houses to be a few hundred individuals.

== Culture ==
Their hunting and weapon of choice is the club and, aside from poison darts they use no other ranged weapons - their workday is about 4–5 hours long, and they often live inside large, communal huts known as malocas. Both men and women paint themselves with a red dye from the roucou plant. Both men and women wear little clothing.

The Korubo hunt spider monkeys, peccary, birds and wild pig, among other species. They grow bananas, manioc and maize in clearings.

A leading cause of illness and death within the tribe is by malaria.

== Western Reporting ==
National Geographic Magazine published an article about them in its August 2003 edition called After First Contact. More recently, in its April 2005 edition, The Smithsonian published an article about the same tribe called Out of Time.

== See also ==
- Sydney Possuelo
- Other Uncontacted Groups of Brazil
