= Matis =

Indigenous people of Brazil

Matís: Matses
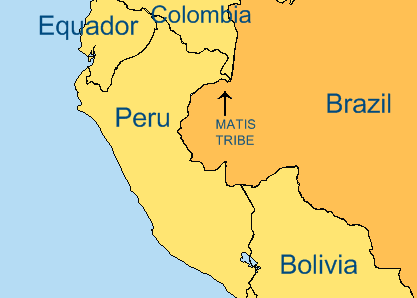

Total population
- 390 (2010)

Regions with significant populations
- Brazil (Amazonas)

Languages
- Matis language, Portuguese

Religion
- traditional tribal religion

The Matis people (also called Matsë in their own native language) are an Indigenous people of Brazil. As of 2014 the population of Matis people was 457. Outsiders sometimes call them the Jaguar People, but they do not like the name. They currently live in the far west of Brazil, in the Vale do Javari Indigenous Territory, an area covering 83,000 square kilometres (32,000 sq mi). They practice hunting, fishing, foraging and agriculture. They work as teachers, health assistants, and surveillance of the territory for FUNAI, among other jobs, and the elders receive pensions from the government (registered as retired farmers, as other traditional communities also have the right for in Brazil).

== Name ==
The Matis people's own names for themselves include the "Mushabo" ("the tattooed people" or possibly "the people of the peach palm"), the "Deshan Mikitbo" (possibly "people of the headwaters"), and the Matses. "Matses" means "person" or "human being" in Matis and related Panoan languages and can also refer to a related neighboring group known as the Matses or Mayoruma. The name Matis was given to them by non-indigenous outsiders, in particular FUNAI officials. Their ritual body modifications include "whiskers" that have caused some journalists or filmmakers to refer to them as the "Jaguar People", but they do not prefer this name.

== Language ==
The Matis language belongs to the Panoan family from the Amazonian area of Brazil. Almost all Matis men and many Matis women speak some Portuguese in addition to Matis.

== Region ==
The Matis live in the far west of Brazil, in the Vale do Javari Indigenous Territory, an area covering 83,000 square kilometres (32,000 sq mi) in three separate communities or villages called maloca with a total population of roughly 340. They originally lived in the region between the Itui and Itacoai rivers but were displaced during the turmoil of the "first contact" period of the 1970s and 1980s.

Access to the Vale do Javari Indigenous Territory is limited by the government of Brazil to protect the indigenous groups inhabiting the area and the environment on which they depend for their traditional lifeways from exploitation by loggers, miners, poachers, drug traffickers and others. Several other indigenous peoples live in this territory, including the Kanamari and the Tsohom Djapa, who sepak languages in the Katukina family, the Marubo, the Kulina Pano, the Korubo and the Matses or Mayoruna, who speak Panoan languages like the Matis. The region is also home to certain other groups of uncontacted peoples. Contact with uncontacted peoples is prohibited by the government of Brazil, even with respect to other indigenous groups living traditional lifeways, but state capacity is low in these areas and monitoring or enforcement is difficult.

== Culture ==
The Matis practice various forms of ritual body modification, including extensive tattooing featuring both traditional and modern designs. They wear facial ornaments including "whiskers" made of sticks, bone piercings, and ear and lip gauges made of shells and other materials.

Matis traditionally used blowguns and bows and arrows for hunting, though in modern times they have supplemented these with shotguns. Blowguns in particular are still preferred for certain tasks like hunting monkeys where they outperform the firearms available. The darts used in this hunting practice are designed such that the tip will break off inside the prey animal. This is achieved via notches carved below the point weakening the neck structure of the dart. Poison for blowgun darts is made from local vines the residue of which is then boiled down to a tar like consistency. The Matis also set traps for various species of game.

Species hunted include the peccary, tapir, sloth, several species of monkey, and caiman. Birds hunted include the macaw, currasaw, jacu, cujubim and nhambu-hen. Fish caught and eaten include the cara, piau, tamboata, traira, poraque, piranha, matipiri, branquinha, curumata, pacu and the pirarucu. The eggs of the yellow-spotted river turtle are also collected and eaten.

Plant foods foraged from the jungle include patauá, buriti, puna (fruit), cocoa and cupu. Some fruit trees harvested by the Matis were planted by previous generations in villages that were deserted during the turmoil of the first contact period. It is likely that other jungle resources reflect pre-contact permaculture work as well.

The Matis farm cassava, banana, peach palm, and corn as staples. Farming among the Matis takes place in rotating, deliberately burned areas called rocas. Each roca is planted with a succession of crops over several growing seasons, and then left to rewild once productivity decreases.

Before contact, the Matis assumed passenger airplanes were xokeke, the spirits of their ancestors. They also assumed bush planes were binkeke, a kind of strange demon-bird. This tribe saw the two kinds of airplanes as distinct phenomena, since passenger planes would appear to be smaller than the bush planes (which fly closer to the ground).

== History ==
Little is known about the Matis specifically before the 1970s, but they were likely affected along with other indigenous tribes of the area, by the depredations associated with the Amazon rubber booms of the late nineteenth and twentieth centuries.

=== "First Contact" Period ===
The Matis people were contacted by the Brazilian agency FUNAI during 1976–1978, although it was not until two years later in 1978 that FUNAI employees began visiting the then-five Matis villages.

As a result of this initial contact, a large number (likely between 1/3 and 2/3) of the Matis population, devoid of natural immunity, died from diseases and from lack of care. By 1983, only 87 Matis people survived, down from a population of initially 300 or more people. The decade also saw the loss of three of their villages which now, completely abandoned, are occasionally visited by the Matis to harvest fruit trees.

Many cultural practices also fell by the wayside, including coming-of-age tattooing practices, but some of these practices have seen a resurgence since the 1990s.

== Current relationship with broader Brazilian society ==
Many elder Matis traditionalists are keen to retain, and in some cases, readopt their old way of life, many younger Matis have been influenced by the modern outside world and want closer ties with modern Brazil, particularly for education.

The Matis collaborate with FUNAI in various ways, serving as guides and translators during Amazonian expeditions of various kinds and liaising between FUNAI and the Korubo, a subset of whom have recently become a contact-tribe.

On October 31, 2009, members of the Matis tribe located nine survivors of a plane crash near the Ituí River then contacted the Brazilian Air Force.

In 2014–2015, a conflict between the Matis and the Korubo resulted in two Matis fatalities and seven to fifteen Korubo fatalities.
