= Nawa language =

Nawa may be:

- Nahuatl, in Mexico
- any of several Panoan languages, such as:
  - Yora language
  - Moa Nawa language
