= Remo language =

Remo language may refer to:

- Several languages of Peru, also known as Sakuya, Sacuya, Kukuini, or Cucuini, an extinct Panoan language of South America
  - Môa Remo language
  - Blanco River Remo language
  - Jaquirana Remo language
- Bonda language or Remo, an Austro-Asiatic language spoken by the Bonda people of India
