= Amahuaca =

Total population
- 500 (2000)

Regions with significant populations
- Brazil (Amazonas); Peru

Languages
- Amahuaca, Spanish, Yaminahua, Sharanahua

Religion
- Animism, Christianity

The Amahuaca or Amhuaca are Indigenous peoples of the southeastern Amazon Basin in Peru and Brazil. Isolated until the 18th century, they are currently under threat from ecological devastation, disease and violence brought by oil extractors and illegal loggers. In 1998, they numbered about 520. The largest community of the Amahuaca is in Puerto Varadero, a jungle community on the Peruvian–Brazilian border.

== Name ==
The Amahuaca are also known as: Amaguaco, Amawaca, Amawáka, Amawaka, Amenguaca, Ameuhaque, Ipitineri, Sayaco, Sayacu, Yora or Hondi Kuí.

== History ==
Since the group established contact with Westerners in the 18th century, they have been threatened by illegal logging, disease, and loss of territory. During the Amazon rubber boom, Amahuaca tribes were largely exploited by rubber barons like Carlos Fitzcarrald and Carlos Scharff.

== Language ==
The Amahuaca, like many neighboring tribes in southwestern Amazonia, speak a Panoan language. As of 2000, approximately 220 Amahuaca spoke the Amahuaca language, a Panoan language. The language is written in the Latin script, and a grammar has been published. From 1963 to 1997, portions of the Bible were translated into Amahuaca.

== Ayahuasca ==
The Amahuaca are one group of Indigenous Amazonians in which shamans are known to use ayahuasca in ritual ceremonies, typically for the purpose of entering the realm of spirits and deceased relatives or ancestors. The use of this drug is not recreational, but rather spiritual.

== Economic development ==
Amahuaca people hunt, fish, farm, and work in the lumber and oil industries or as domestic servants. They harvest and process Brazil nuts.
