= Matsés language =

Indigenous language on Brazil–Peru border

Matsés
- Mayoruna
- Pronunciation: /ˈmat͡sə/
- Native to: Peru, Brazil
- Ethnicity: Matsés
- Native speakers: 2,200 (2006)
- Language family: Panoan: Mayoruna; Mayo; Matses group; Matsés
- Dialects: Peruvian; Brazilian; Paud Usunkid †; Pisabo (see below)

Official status
- Official language in: Brazil (Amazonas)

Language codes
- ISO 639-3: mcf
- Glottolog: mats1244
- ELP: Matsés
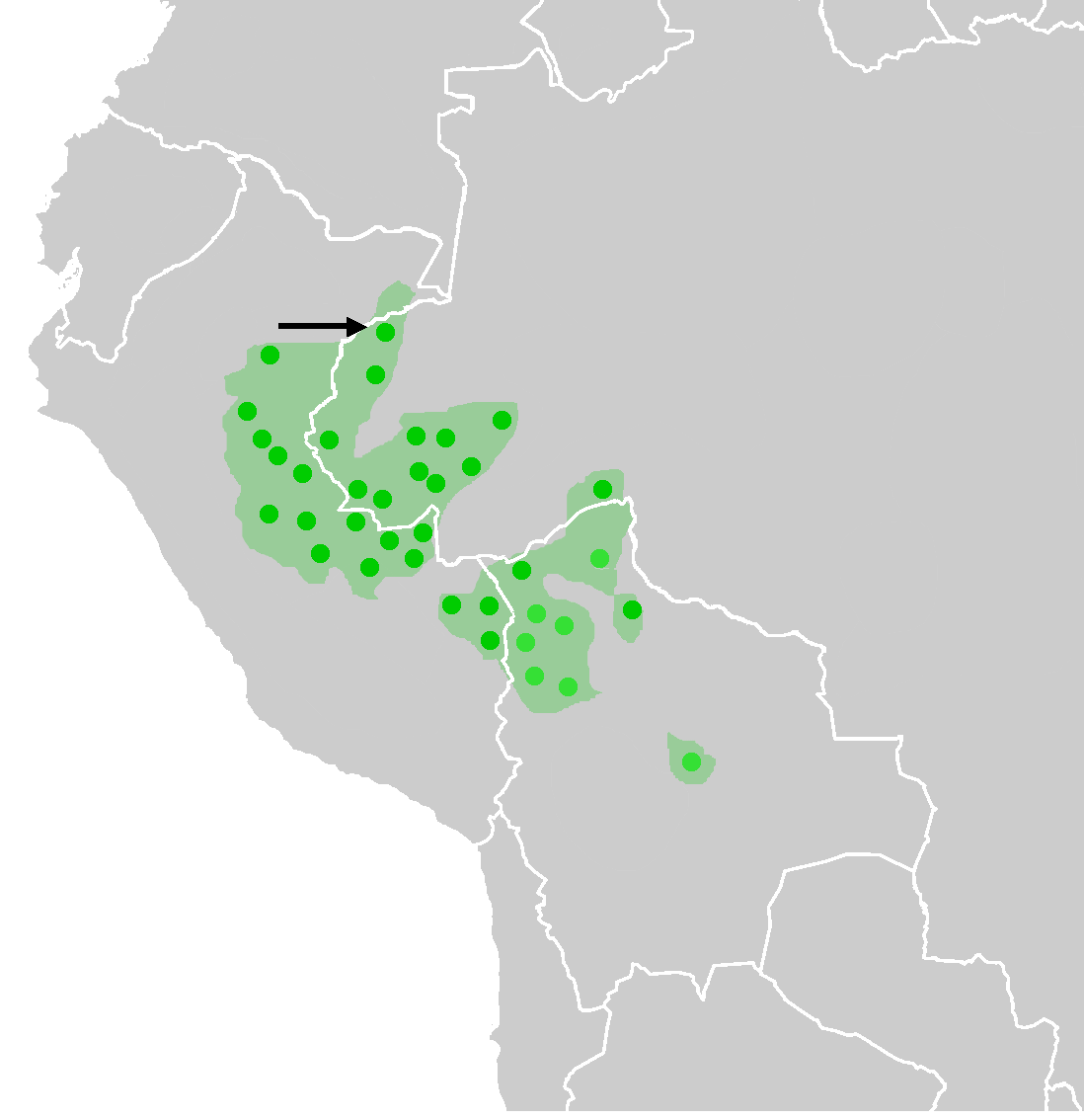
- Pano-Tacanan languages (Matses-Mayoruna language is indicated with an arrow)

Matsés, also referred to as Mayoruna in Brazil, is an indigenous language utilized by the Matsés, inhabitants of the border regions of Brazil and Peru. Matsés communities are located along the Javari River basin of the Amazon, which forms part of the border between Brazil and Peru; hence the term river people. This term, previously used by Jesuits to refer to inhabitants of that area, is not formally a word in the Matsés language. The language is vigorous and is spoken by all age groups in the Matsés communities. Several other indigenous are also spoken in Matsés communities by women captured from neighboring tribes and some mixture of the languages occur. Dialects are Peruvian Matsés, Brazilian Matsés, and the extinct Paud Usunkid.

== Etymology ==
A term with Quechua origins, Mayoruna translates to mayu = river; runa = people. Colonizers and missionaries during the 17th century used this term to refer to the Indigenous peoples that occupied the lower Ucayali Region, Upper Solimões and the Vale do Javari.

== Speakers ==
From research gathered in 2003, Fleck states that the Matsés language is spoken by approximately 2,000-2,200 Matsés, since being contacted in 1969. In Brazil, the Matsés inhabit the Vale do Javari Indigenous Territory (IT) that covers 8,519,800 hectares of land. The land is distributed among eight communities that are mostly located within the IT borders. According to a more recent census (2007), the population of Matsés in Brazil was 1,143 people. Meanwhile, in 1998, the Peruvian Matsés population reached a total of 1,314 people.

It is very common for Matsés families in the northern Pano group to shift between villages, including across national borders. As a result, it becomes difficult to establish trustworthy data for the Matsés populations in Brazil and Peru. Currently, Matsés in Brazil identify themselves as monolingual, since most children in Matsés communities are nurtured and taught exclusively in the Matsés language. For this reason, the level of endangerment of the language is relatively low. The Instituto Socioambiental states: "Only those people who have worked or studied in the surrounding Peruvian or Brazilian towns speak Portuguese or Spanish fluently." This strongly indicates that the language will sustain itself throughout generations. One of the most important functions of language is to produce a social reality that is reflective of that language's culture. When children are raised learning the language, the continuation of the cultural traditions, values, and beliefs is enabled, reducing the chances of that language becoming endangered.

== Classification ==
Currently, the Matsés language belongs to one of the largest subsets within the Northern Pano region. The Panoan family of languages is known to be spoken in Peru, western Brazil, and Bolivia. In turn, Panoan languages are included within the larger Pano-Tacanan family. This language group includes languages of Indigenous groups similar to the Matsés, including Matis, Kulina-Pano, Maya, Korubo, and other groups that presently evade contact with the outside world (De Almeida Matos, 2003). Not only are these Indigenous groups culturally similar, they share mutually intelligible languages.

== Literature ==
Bibliographies about Panoan and Matsés linguistic and anthropological sources can be found in Fabre (1998), Erikson (2000), and Erikson et el. (1994). A Pano-Takana bibliography written by Chavarría Mendoza in 1983 is outdated, but still has relevant information about some linguistic and anthropological works on the Matsés. Missionaries from the Summer Institute of Linguistics (SIL) produced the first descriptions of the Matsés language. Researchers utilized escaped captives as consultants and were able to study the language and culture from the verbal affirmations of captives before they were able to make contact in 1969.

The most extensive published grammatical description of this language is the educational work done by the SIL, intended to teach the Matsés language to Spanish speakers. This work focused on the morphology of the language as well as the phonology and syntax systems. Literature which includes phonological descriptions, grammatical descriptions, collections of texts and word lists can be found in the work published by Fields and Kneeland during (approximately) 1966 to 1981. Kneeland (1979) has developed an extensive modern lexicon for Matsés which includes approximately an 800-word Matsés-Spanish glossary, along with some sample sentences. Work completed by Wise (1973) contains a Spanish-Matsés word list with approximately 150 entries.

Carmen Teresa Dorigo de Carvalho, a Brazilian fieldworker and linguist, has been conducting linguistic analyses based on her work about the Brazilian Matsés. Her contributions to the study of this language include her Master's thesis on Matsés sentence structure and a PhD dissertation on Matsés phonology, based on an optimality theory treatment of Matsés syllable structure and many other aspects of Matsés phonology. In addition to this work, she published an article about Matsés tense and aspect, an article on split ergativity, and an unpublished paper on negation in Matsés and Marubo.

== Phonology ==
Matsés has 21 distinctive segments: 15 consonants and 6 vowels. Along with these vowels and consonants, contrastive stress also is a part of the phoneme inventory. The following charts contain the consonants and vowels of the language, as well as their major allophones that are indicated in parentheses.

=== Vowels ===
The vowel system of Matsés is peculiar in that no vowels are rounded. Both of its back vowels should accurately be represented as [ɯ] and [ɤ] but the convention is to transcribe them orthographically with ⟨u⟩ and ⟨o⟩.

Vowels
	Front	Central	Back
Close	i	ɨ	ɯ ⟨u⟩
Mid	ɛ		ɤ ⟨o⟩
Open		ɑ	

=== Consonants ===
Consonants
	Labial	Alveolar	Retroflex	Palatal	Velar	Glottal
Nasal	m	n			(ŋ)	
Plosive	p b	t d			k	(ʔ)
Fricative		s	ʂ	ʃ		
Affricates		ts	tʂ	tʃ		
Approximant	w			j		
Flap			ɾ			

== Morphology ==
The Indigenous Brazilian language, Matsés is a language that falls into the classification of both an isolating and a polysynthetic language. Typically, single-morpheme words are common, and some longer words could include about 10 morphemes. Still, the general use of morphemes per word in the language tends to be 3 or 4. Half of the Matsés language makes use of simple morphemes, while "verbal inflectional suffixes, transitivity agreement enclitics, and class-changing suffixes are, with very few exceptions, portmanteau morphemes." Morphemes normally, imply a one-to-one association between the two domains, but the Matsés language permits portmanteau morphemes to be part of the morphology. The distinction applies to morphemes, as productive synchronically segmented forms, while a formative morpheme includes "historical forms that are fossilized sub-morphemic elements with form-meaning associations." Root words in the language possess lexical meaning and need to occupy the nuclear parts of the word. What helps identify the nuclear word, is that it involves the use of free morphemes within the phrase, also if it occurs alone without other phonologically attached material. Free and bound morphemes also distinguish roots from affixes/clitics. Roots are morphemes that can also occur with inflectional morphology. However, some adverbs must be inflected for a transitivity agreement, as well as verbs that are not being used in the imperative mode, or that occur alone as monomorphemic words, because semantically monomorphemic words are incompatible with the imperative mode. All roots in the language can occur with no phonologically attached material, or with inflectional morphology. A stem is combined with either a root with one, none, or multiple affixes/clitics. Words are defined as a stem that is combined with inflectional suffixes, when it is necessary to do so.

A pronoun is a word used as a substitute for a noun, it may function alone, or as a noun phrase to refer either to the participants in the discourse or to something mentioned in the discourse. Typically, in Matsés, pronouns are divided into four types: personal, interrogative, indefinite, and demonstrative. Each of these types of pronouns include three case-specific forms, that are known as absolutive, ergative/instrumental and genitive. Pronouns in this language are not distinguished by number, gender, social status or personal relations between the participants in the discourse.

mimbi chedo
2.ERG etc./too
'you and them'/'you too!'

ubi chedo
1.ABS etc./too
'me and others'/'me too!'

=== Inflection vs Derivation ===
Inflection is the change in the form of a word, usually by adding a suffix to the ending, which would mark distinctions such as tense, number, gender, mood, person, voice and case. Whereas derivation is a formation of a new word or injectable stem that comes from another word or stem. This usually occurs by adding an affix to the word, which would make the new word have a different word class from the original. In Matsés, inflection normally only occurs on verbs as a lexical-class-wide and syntactic-position-wide phenomenon. There are a set of suffixes that include finite inflection and class-changing suffixes that must occur on finite verbs. Adjectives are also a word class that have a lexical-class-wide inflection. Adverbs and postpositions have a marginal inflectional category known as transitivity agreement.

Traditionally, derivational morphology includes meaning-changing, valence-changing and class-changing morphology. In the reading A Grammar of Matsés by David Fleck, he uses the term "derivational" to refer to only meaning-changing and valence-changing morphology. This is due to the fact that class-changing morphology patterns are closely related to inflectional suffixes. For the verbs in Matsés, the inflectional suffixes and class-changing suffixes are in pragmatic contrast, (shown in example 1), so it could be concluded that all verbs in this language either require class-changing morphology or inflection.

opa cuen-me-nu
dog run.off-CAUS-INTENT.1
'I'm going to make the dog run off'

opa cuen-me-boed nid-ac
dog run.off-CAUS-REC.PST:NMLZ go-INFR
'The one who made the dog run off has left'

opa cuen-me-ash nid-o-sh
dog run.off-CAUS-after:S/A>S go-Past-3
'After making the dogs run off, he left'

Table 2 displays the differences between derivational and inflectional/class-changing morphology in the language Matsés.

Table 2
Derivational Morphology	Inflectional/Class-changing morphology
Optional; Closer to root; Simple morphemes; Most lexical classes have them	Obligatory (at least in some situations); Further from root; Almost all are portmanteau morphemes; Most are restricted to verbs

=== Reduplication ===
There was a generalization put forth by Payne (1990), stating that in lowland South American languages, all cases of reduplication are iconic. This means that they are indicating imperfective action, greater intensity, progressive aspect, iterative, plurality, or onomatopoeia of repeated sounds. Matsés, does not confirm this generalization, as there are various different meanings that have to do with reduplication, which includes iconic, non-iconic, and "counter-iconic" reduplication. A summary of the different functions and meanings of reduplication in Matsés are shown in Table 3.

Table 3
Iconic	Suffixed verb reduplication = distributive (iterative, plural, habitual, spatial, distribution); Adverb reduplication = distributive; Cliticized postposition reduplication = distributive; Some animal names mimic animal call with repetitive notes
Non-iconic	Noun reduplication = adjectivization
"Counter-iconic"	Unsuffixed verb reduplication = incompletely, improperly, hurriedly; Unprefixed adjective reduplication = de-intensification (i.e., 'somewhat X'); Prefixed adjective reduplication = partly (i.e., adjective only applies to part of the prefixed body part); Uncliticized postposition reduplication: de-intensification

== Syntax ==
=== Case and Agreement ===
The Indigenous Brazilian language known as Matsés, is considered to be an ergative-absolutive system. Sentences in this language case mark the subject of an intransitive sentence equal to the object of a transitive sentence. In particular, the subject of a transitive sentence is treated as the ergative, while the subject of an intransitive verb and the object of a transitive verb is weighed as the absolutive. To identify core arguments based on noun phrases, absolutive argument are identified via noun or noun phrase that are not the final part of a larger phrase and occur without an overt marker. Non-absolutive nominals are marked in one of the three ways:

1. case-marking,
2. phonologically independent, directly following postposition word,
3. occurring as a distinct form that generally incorporates a nasal.

In contrast, ergative arguments are identifiable through ergative nouns or noun phrases' that are "case-marked with the enclitic -n, identical to instrumental and genitive case markers, and to the locative/temporal postpositional enclitic." Pronoun forms are more distinctive, in form and distribution. There are four pronominal forms associated with the four -n enclitics and this suggests that there are four independent markers, in contrast to a single morpheme with a broader range of functions. Enclitics suggest that the four markers could be either: ergative, genitive, instrumental and locative, where each enclitic represent different kinds of morphemes. The locative noun phrase can be replaced by deictic adverbs, whereas an ergative, genitive, and instrumental are replaced by pronouns in the language. The locative postpositional enclitic -n is the core argument marker, and additionally is phonologically identified to the ergative case marker. This means that it can code two different semantic roles, locative and temporal. Ergative and absolutive are imposed by predicates and are later identified as cases, since they are lexically specified by the verbs, and never occur optionally. Adjacently, genitive cases are not governed by predicates but rather the structure of the possessive noun phrase. Since most possessive noun phrases require the possessor to be marked as a genitive, some postpositions require their objects to be in the genitive case, if human. Together with coding ownership, interpersonal relation, or a part-whole relation, the genitive marker obtains the syntactic function of marking the genitive noun as subordinate to a head noun. Instrumental is that least prototypical case, however, like the ergative, instrumental is allowed per clause. Unlike the ergative, it occurs optionally. Instrumental cases also require remote causative constructions of inanimate causes to appear and if there is an overt agent in a passive clause, then, by definition, it is an instrumental case.

== Semantics ==
=== Plurals ===
In Matsés, the suffix -bo may be optionally attached to a noun that refers to humans, but excluding pronouns. This is used to specify that the referent involves a homogeneous category, shown in example 1, but it could also occur with a non-human reference to show a heterogeneous category, although this is quite rare (example 2 and 3).

Abitedi-mbo uënës-bud-ne-ac mëdin-bo aid
all-AUG die-DUR-DISTR-Narr.PAST deceased.person-PL that.one
'All of them have died off, the now deceased one... those ones.'

chompian-bo
shotgun-PL
'Different types of shotguns'/ 'shotguns, etc.'

poshto-bo
woolly.monkey-PL
'Woolly monkeys and other types of monkeys'

Padnuen sinnad utsi-bo mannan-n-quio cani-quid
By.contrast palm.genus other-PL hill-LOC-AUG grow-HAB
'By contrast, other kinds of sinnad palms grow deep in the hills [upland forest].'

With human subjects, the plurality indicator -bo is used to either indicate a set of people in a group (4a), a category of people (4a, and 5), or with numerous people who are acting separately (4a, and 6). In addition to the suffix –bo indicating plurality, the verbal suffixes –cueded or –beded are used to specify collective semantics, used either with or without –bo (4b).

chido-bo choe-e-c
woman-PL come-NPAST-IND
'A group of women are coming'
'Women (always) come.'
'Women are coming (one by one)'

chido(-bo) cho-cueded-e-c
women(-PL) come-Coll:S/A-NPAST-IND
'A group of women are coming'

tsësio-bo-n-uid-quio sedudie pe-quid
old.man-PL-ERG-only-AUG nine.banded.armadillo eat-HAB
'Only old men eat nine-banded armadillos'

cun papa pado-bo-n cain-e-c
1Gen father deceased-PL-ERG wait-NPAST-IND
'My late father and my uncles wait for them [historical present]'

Usually a Matsés speaker would leave out the -bo suffix and let the speaker figure out the plurality from the context, or if number is important in the context, the speaker would use a quantitative adverb such as daëd 'two', tëma 'few', dadpen 'many'.

Another plurality indicator in this language is the suffix -ado. This suffix is used to specify that all members are being included and it can even include members that are in similar categories, whereas the suffix -bo only refers to a subset of a kinship category. This difference is shows in example 7a and 7b.

cun chibi-bo
1Gen younger.sister-PL
'My younger sisters'
'My younger female parallel cousins'

cun chibi-ado
1Gen younger.sister-PL:Cat.Ex
'My younger sisters and younger female parallel cousins (and others sisters, and female cousins)'

== Pisabo language ==
Pisabo
- Mayo, Quixito, Pisagua
- (unattested)
- Native to: Peru, Brazil
- Native speakers: 600 (2006)
- Language family: Pano-Tacanan: Panoan; Mayoruna; Mayo; Matses group; Matsés; Pisabo

Language codes
- ISO 639-3: pig
- Glottolog: pisa1244
- ELP: Matsés

Pisabo, also known as Pisagua (Pisahua), is a purported Panoan language spoken by approximately 600 people in Peru and formerly in Brazil, where it was known as Mayo (Maya, Maia) and was evidently the language known as Quixito. However, no linguistic data is available, and it is reported to be mutually intelligible with Matses.
