= Pyn =

Pyn or PYN may refer to:

- Bobby Pyn, an American punk rock vocalist also known as Darby Crash
- pyn, the ISO 639-3 code for the Poyanawa language of Brazil
- PYN, the National Rail code for Penryn railway station, Cornwall, UK
