= Yawanawa language =

Language

Yawanawa
- Shanenawa
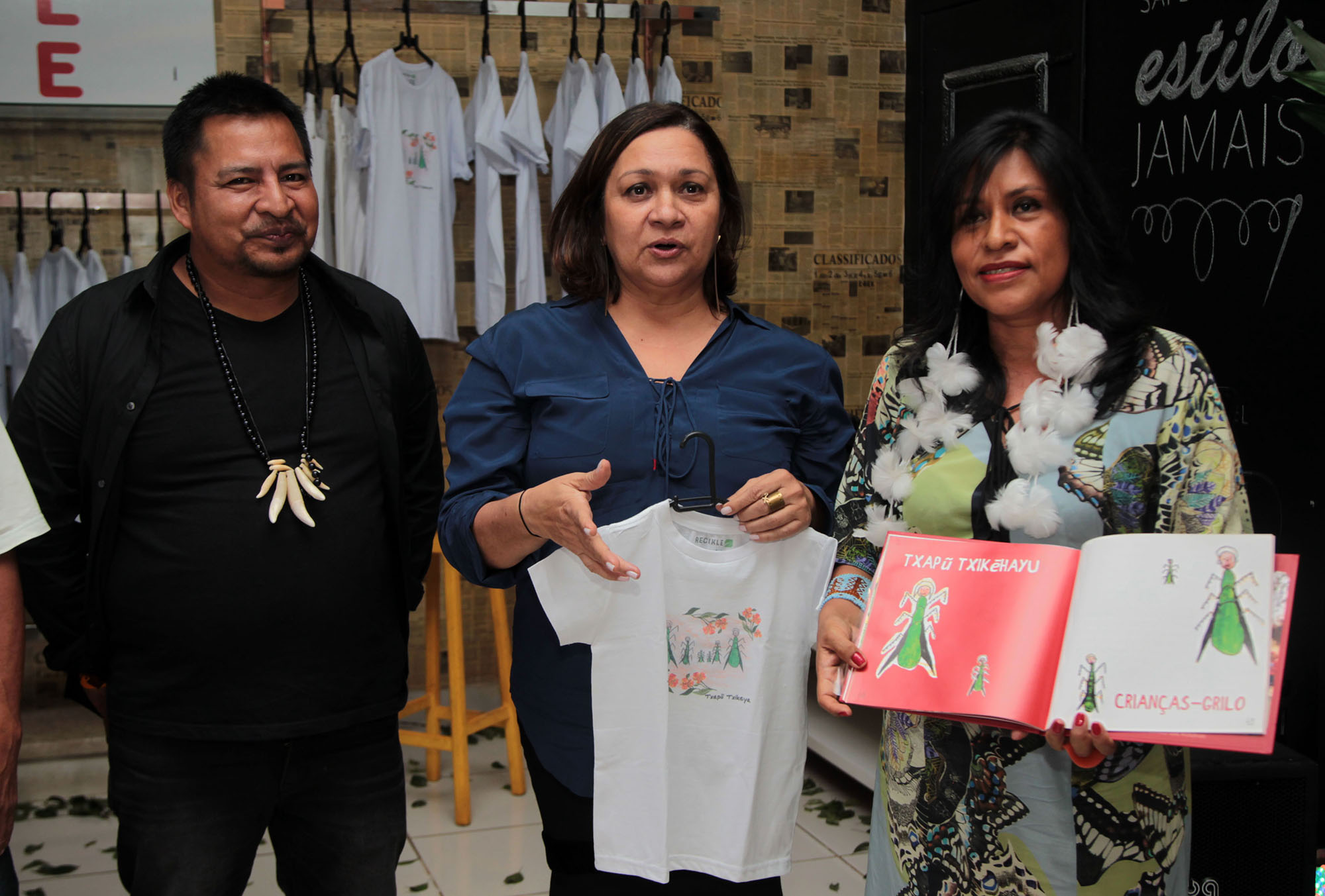
- Bilingual Portuguese-Yawanawa book
- Native to: Brazil
- Native speakers: (450 cited 1999)
- Language family: Pano–Tacanan: Panoan; Amawak–Jaminawa; Yawanawa

Language codes
- ISO 639-3: ywn
- Glottolog: yawa1260

Yawanawa is a Panoan language of Brazil. It also goes by the name Shanenawa – it is not clear if this is distinct from the reportedly extinct Panoan language Shaninawa.
