= Katukina language =

Katukina language may refer to:

- the Katukína dialect of Katukína-Kanamarí, a language of the Katukinan language family
- the Katukina Pano language

== See also ==
- Catuquinarú, an extinct and unclassified language
