= Olivença Kulina language =

Panoan language of Brazil

Kulina
- Culina of São Paulo de Olivença
- Native to: Brazil
- Region: São Paulo de Olivença
- Ethnicity: Kulina (Pano)
- Extinct: (date missing)
- Language family: Panoan: Mainline Panoan; Nawa; Marubo group; Kulina

Language codes
- ISO 639-3: None (mis)
- Glottolog: None maru1252 Marúbo

Olivença Kulina is an extinct Panoan language of Brazil (Fleck 2013). The Kulina language of Olivença was first recorded by Johann Baptist von Spix in 1820.

The name "Pano Kulina" normally refers to the Kulina language of Curuça.
