= Arasairi =

Arasairi may refer to:

- Arasairi people, an ethnic group of Peru
- Arasairi language, a language of Peru

== See also ==
- Arazaire, an extinct language of Peru
