= Arazaire language =

Extinct language of Peru

Arazaire–Arasa
- Native to: Peru
- Region: Department of Madre de Dios
- Ethnicity: Arazaire
- Era: attested 1906
- Language family: Panoan/Tacanan: Mainline Panoan; Nawa; Madre de Dios; Arazaire–Arasa
- Dialects: Arazaire; Arasa

Language codes
- ISO 639-3: None (mis)
- Glottolog: araz1236

Arazaire and Arasa are a pair of closely related languages of uncertain affiliation, within the Pano-Tacanan languages.

== Classification ==
These have been claimed to be either Panoan or Takanan, or Takanan with Panoan words. Campbell (2012) says they are too poorly attested to classify. However, Fleck (2013) classifies them definitely in the Madre de Dios branch of Panoan, and says that the confusion is due to a second, Takanan language that also went by the names Arazaire and Arasa; a similar naming problem has caused confusion with its close relative Yamiaka. The name Arasairi has been used for yet another language, a dialect of the Harakmbut.

Loukotka (1968) uses Arazaire for the Panoan language and Arasa for the Takanan language. The names both derive from the Arasa river.

== Vocabulary ==
gloss	various Panoan	Arazaire ("Panoan")	Arasa ("Takanan")
sun	huari	fuari	huári
one		nunchina	nonchina
two		buta	béta
head		mashashue	é-osha
water	éna, xéne, etc.	humapasha	éna
maize		hoki	shishe
house	shopo, shobo		so:po
