= Sensi language =

Extinct Panoan language of Peru

Sensi
- Tenti
- Native to: Peru
- Region: Ucayali River
- Extinct: mid 20th century
- Language family: Panoan: Mainline Panoan; Nawa; Chama; Sensi

Language codes
- ISO 639-3: sni
- Glottolog: sens1242

Sensi (Senti, Senci, Sentci, Senchi, Scensevo, Shensivo, Ssenssi, Šintsi) is an extinct Panoan language, spoken on the right bank of the Ucayali River, Peru. It disappeared around the mid-20th century.

== History ==
The Sensi people were first contacted in 1811 by Franciscans on the headwaters of the Maquía River, an eastern tributary of the Ucayali River. They were frequently described as highly different from other Panoan-speaking peoples, and their language was very different from others, though also as being similar to other Panoan languages. The Sensi language was initially documented in 12 words published in 1836 by Smyth and Lowe. Subsequently, Günter Tessmann (1930) includes a number of vocabulary items in the language. They disappear from the historical record in the mid-20th century.

== Classification ==
The Franciscans were the first to recognize the similarity of Sensi to other Panoan languages. In spite of its reported difference from other Panoan groups, David Fleck proposes that it was very similar to the Shipibo or Wariapano languages.

== Vocabulary ==
The following Sensi vocabulary items are listed in Tessmann (1930):

Sensi vocabulary
gloss	Sensi
woman	tši
jaguar	ináwa
tapir	áwua
stick	hívui
two	rawué
white	hóxo
red	ozé
corn	šinki
black	tšö́xö
caiman	mápue
to eat	piwué
to sleep	uxe (tá)
to kill	tete
sun	varíxi
banana	maníewo
one	nawuištikoe
water	enipáxa
good	íro
bad	mítše
house	puö́xe
tongue	yáta
tooth	küö́́dsa
eye	ítso
ear	helíxi
head	oma’tsi
hand	epípi
moon	puöne
earth	kuáhi
stone	mátsi
pot	tšapuóxe
man	mankó
woman	tšinán
chicken	otšitši
cassava	óma
three	narawuekoe

15 total words do not correspond to words in other Panoan languages, and the other 20 are similar to Panoan languages of the Chama group. Tessmann himself claimed that only 17 words belonged to Panoan, seven words were from Jê, and five words from Arawakan, also suspecting that some words from Sensi were actually from Setebo instead. Fleck thus accords the informant to speak a language related to, but not a part of, the Chama group, and answered with non-Panoan vocabulary items when he had forgot his Sensi language. These may have been fabricated or from other legitimate languages. Thus, Sensi may be either a Panoan language, a mixed Panoan-non-Panoan language, or a completely non-Panoan language, in which case the informant would have taken vocabulary from Panoan languages which he also knew whenever he forgot his language. The first option is improbable, due to the geographic distribution of the languages proposed to be mixed in question, the second option is unlikely due to the Franciscan missionaries' reports, and the third option is equally improbable due to the existence of the other wordlist published by Smyth and Lowe.

Sensi vocabulary
gloss	literal meaning	Sensi
Canopus	thing of the day	noteste
Jupiter	-	ishmawook
Sirius	little caiman	kapaygui
Orion (Rigel)	land tortoise	manasang
Procyon	-	chiska
Orion's Belt	-	kishumah
Southern Cross	dew	nebo
Mars	forward	tapa
Regulus	arrow	pijarre
Gemini	cross	koorus
Capella	spoon	cuchara
Scorpius	manatee	manatee

Three Spanish loanwords are found in the Smyth and Lowe list. The other words are very clearly of Panoan origin. This suggests that Sensi was indeed a "pure" Panoan language of the Chama subgroup.
