= Capanahua language =

Language

Capanahua
- Kapanawa
- Native to: Peru
- Ethnicity: 400 Capanahua
- Native speakers: 50 (2007)
- Language family: Pano–Tacanan: Panoan; Shipibo; Capanahua

Language codes
- ISO 639-3: kaq
- Glottolog: capa1241

Capanahua or Kapanawa [kapaˈnawa] is a moribund Panoan language spoken in western South America by 50 of the 400 Capanahua people, around the area of the Tapiche-Buncuya river.

== Usage ==
If a Capanahua speaker talks to another Capanahua speaker in Spanish, it is considered insulting and the application of the stigmatizing label of outsider. The language is in decline since there are few speakers and almost no children can speak it. Capanahua is used in two bilingual schools and, to some degree, in other primary schools, but not in secondary schools. Capanahua speakers and people are referred to derogatorily as "Capachos".

== Classification ==
There is one dialect called Pahenbaquebo; the closest related language is Shipibo, with which is shared 50 to 60 percent comprehensibility.

== Phonology ==
Consonants
	Labial	Alveolar	Retroflex	(Alveolo-} Palatal	Velar	Laryngeal
Nasal	m	n				
Plosive	p	t			k	ʔ
Affricate		ts		tɕ		
Fricative	β	s	ʂ	ɕ		(h)
Sonorant	w	ɾ		j		

/h/ is placed in a "Pharyngeal" column separate from "Laryngeal" in the source. It is unclear if it is meant to represent /ħ/ instead.

Since /h/ occurs only in word initial position before vowels and vowels never occur initially unpreceded by /h/ or another consonant, /h/ can be regarded as a predictable redundancy. [sic]

Vowels
	Front	Back
Close	i	ɯ
Mid		o
Open	a	

/o/ ranges from mid close to high open, unconditioned. [sic]

The source uses "High/Low" instead of "Close/Open".

== Orthography ==
There is 5 to 10 percent literacy in Spanish compared to 10 percent literacy in the native mother tongue. The language has a written grammar, a dictionary, and uses Latin script when written.

== Bibliography ==
- Fleck, David W. (2013-10-10). Panoan Languages and Linguistics. Anthropological Papers of the American Museum of Natural History. American Museum of Natural History. p. 11. doi:10.5531/sp.anth.0099. hdl:2246/6448. ISBN 978-0-9852016-2-3.
- Loos, Eugène (1969). The Phonology of Capanahua and Its Grammatical Basis. Summer Institute of Linguistics. Archived from the original on 2024-04-02.
