= Yora language =

Language of Peru

Yora
- Nahua, Parkenawa
- Native to: Peru
- Region: Manu Park, Panagua River
- Native speakers: 170 known; possibly 400 uncontacted (2007)
- Language family: Pano–Tacanan: Panoan; Amawaka–Jaminawa (divergent); Yora

Language codes
- ISO 639-3: mts
- Glottolog: yora1241

Yora (Yura), also called Yuranahua, Parkenawa, or simply Nahua, is an indigenous language of Peru in the region of Manú National Park on the Panagua River. It belongs to the Panoan language family which also counts Cashibo language, Shipibo language; the languages most closely related to Yora are the Yaminahua and Sharanahua languages.

== Name ==
The Yora call themselves [yuɾɐ] 'people'.

== Classification ==
Yora is classified as closest to Yaminawa in the Documento nacional de lenguas originarios del Perú. David Fleck (2013) treats it as a dialect of Yaminawa.

== Dialects ==
Speakers of Yora have claimed to belong to one of three subgroups, these being the Maxonafa, Roanifo, or Iskonafa. Claims about other people belonging to these groups are based on their father's ancestry. A few grammatical markers are different and vocabulary differences are attested, though the three groups are not known to speak distinct dialects of Yora.

== History ==
=== Language contact ===
For some time, a number of Yora speakers lived with speakers of Yaminawa along the Purus River. A number of orphans resulting from a 1984 epidemic were also raised by Yaminawa speakers. Additionally, a number of Yaminawa speakers have also moved into Yora-speaking communities. Presumably, this contact has influenced the speech of the Yora, so that they use certain Yaminawa morphemes, including words.

== Status ==
According to the Ethnologue, there were 350 to 400 speakers of Yora in 1998, but the language was vigorous in the communities.

== Geographical distribution ==
Speakers of Yora live in the communities of Santa Rosa del Serjali and San Martín, which are near each other. They are located on the Mishagua River, at the mouth of the Serjali River.
