= Chiriba language =

Language of Moxos Province, Bolivia

Chiriba
- Chiriva
- Native to: Bolivia
- Region: Moxos Province
- Extinct: (date missing)
- Language family: Panoan?: Mainline Panoan; Nawa; Bolivian; Chiriba
- Dialects: Chumana?

Language codes
- ISO 639-3: None (mis)
- Glottolog: chir1294

Chiriba (Chiriva) is a poorly attested language of Moxos Province, Bolivia which may have belonged to the Panoan family. All that was recorded of it was a list of seven words; several of these resemble Panoan languages, especially Pakawara, and none resemble other language families. Unattested Chumana is reported to have been related.

== Vocabulary ==
Chíriva word list from the late 1790s published in Palau and Saiz (1989):

Spanish gloss	English gloss	Chíriva
bueno	good	sheoma
malo	bad	besoma
el padre	father	reomo
la madre	mother	yllquite
el hermano	brother	ycoyo
uno	one	tevisí
dos	two	jorová

== See also ==
- Reyesano language
