= Mayoruna language (Jandiatuba) =

Extinct Panoan language of Brazil

Mayoruna
- Jandiatuba Mayoruna
- Native to: Brazil
- Region: Jandiatuba River
- Ethnicity: Mayoruna
- Extinct: after 1957
- Language family: Panoan: Mayoruna; Mayo; Matis group; Mayoruna

Language codes
- ISO 639-3: None (mis)
- Glottolog: mayo1270

Jandiatuba Mayoruna is an extinct indigenous language of the Brazilian Amazon basin, near the borders of Peru and Colombia. The language is cited as Mayoruna of the Jandiatuba River in David Fleck's classification of the Panoan languages. Its closest extant relative is the Matis language. The only known linguistic data on Jandiatuba Mayoruna is a 503-word lexicon from 1957.
