= Mayoruna language (Amazon) =

Extinct indigenous language of South America

Mayoruna
- Amazon Mayoruna
- Native to: Brazil, Peru, Colombia
- Region: Amazon River
- Ethnicity: Mayoruna
- Extinct: after 19th century
- Language family: Panoan: Mayoruna; Mayo; Matis group; Mayoruna
- Dialects: "wild"; "settled"

Language codes
- ISO 639-3: None (mis)
- Glottolog: mayo1271

Amazon Mayoruna is an extinct indigenous once spoken along the Amazon River, on the borders of Brazil, Peru, and Colombia. It is documented by two 19th-century wordlists recorded by European explorers. There were two dialects, known only as the dialects of the "wild" Mayoruna and the "settled" Mayoruna.
