= Kaxararí language =

Panoan language spoken in Brazil

Kaxararí
- Kaxarari
- Native to: Brazil
- Region: northwest Rondônia
- Native speakers: (270 cited 2001)
- Language family: Panoan: Mainline Panoan; Kaxararí

Language codes
- ISO 639-3: ktx
- Glottolog: kaxa1239

Kaxararí is a Panoan language of Brazil. It is spoken around the northwest border of the State of Rondônia. The Kaxarari language is the most divergent of the Mainline Panoan branch.

== Phonology ==
=== Consonants ===
Kaxararí has 16 consonant phonemes (Sousa 2004).

Consonant phonemes
		Bilabial	Alveolar	Alveolo -palatal	Retroflex	Palatal	Velar	Glottal
Nasal		m	n			ɲ		
Plosive		p	t				k	
Tap								
Affricate			ts	tʃ				
Fricative		β	s	ʃ	ʂ			h
Approximant	Median	w				j		
Approximant	Lateral		l					

== Vocabulary ==
Kaxarari Vocabulary (Sousa 2004):

nº	English	Portuguese	Kaxarari
1.	stone	pedra	ʃaˈʃu
2.	sand	areia	hunuˈmaʃi
3.	dust	pó	ˈmapu
4.	clay, earth	barro, terra	ˈmaβi
5.	hole	buraco	ˈkili
6.	coal	carvão	tiˈtiʃi
7.	mountain	montanha	mãˈkuʃaj
8.	hill	morro	mãkuˈlaki
9.	sun	sol	waˈʧi
10.	moon	lua	ˈuʃi
11.	star	estrela	ʃãˈlali
12.	sky	céu	naiˈʧi
13.	cloud	nuvem	kuˈani
14.	rain	chuva	ˈwahi
15.	thunder	trovão	kaˈlaka
16.	wind	vento	uˈhila
17.	air	ar	mɨurɨˈta
18.	light	luz	ˈisto
19.	shadow	sombra	paˈki
20.	summer	verão	βaˈʧia
21.	winter	inverno	uˈja
22.	fire	fogo	ʧiˈi
23.	firewood	lenha	ʧipaˈʃa
24.	smoke	fumaça	kuˈani
25.	ember	brasa	ʧiˈpɨki
26.	ash	cinza	maˈpu
27.	large river	rio grande	wakaˈlaki
28.	small river	rio pequeno	wakapiˈʃa
29.	water	água	ˈwaka
30.	animal	animal	ʃuˈi
31.	pet	animal de estimação	iˈnaβa
32.	bat	morcego	kaʃiˈwa
33.	monkey	macaco	ʃiluˈa
34.	lesser anteater	tamanduá pequeno	ˈβiβi
35.	mouse	rato	ʃujˈã
36.	sloth	bicho-preguiça	ˈnali
37.	capybara	capivara	ˈmaka
38.	paca	paca	anaˈu
39.	agouti	cutia	maʧahi
40.	dog	cachorro	ʧaʂˈpa
41.	two dogs	dois cachorros	ʧaβuta ʧaʂˈpa
42.	three dogs	três cachorro	ʧaβutauipi ʧaʂˈpa
43.	large dog	cachorro grande	ʧaʂˈpa laki
44.	small dog	cachorro pequeno	ʧaʂˈpa ˈpisti
45.	coati	quati	ʃiˈʃiwa
46.	jaguar	onça	inaˈwa
47.	large jaguar	onça grande	inawaʧuˈa
48.	small jaguar	onça pequena	inawapisˈte
49.	tapir	anta	awaˈʧa
50.	deer	veado	ʧaˈʃu
51.	Amazonian brown brocket	veado roxo	kaˈhu
52.	vulture	urubu	iʃˈmili
53.	king vulture	urubu-rei	iʃmiliβakuˈʃo
54.	hawk	gavião	ˈiʧu
55.	macaw	arara	ʃawaˈlã
56.	parrot	papagaio	ˈβawa
57.	my parrot	meu papagaio	ɨˈβawa
58.	your parrot	teu papagaio	miˈβawa
59.	her parrot	papagaio dela	haˈβawa
60.	owl	coruja	ˈpupu
61.	toucan	tucano	ˈʃɨkɨ
62.	nest	ninho	ʃuipistaˈna
63.	snake's nest	ninho de cobra	ʧuluaˈna
64.	egg	ovo	βaˈʧi
65.	turtle	tartaruga	naˈsã
66.	many turtles	muita tartaruga	nasaˈnaki
67.	few turtles	pouca tartaruga	nasanaˈkima
68.	caiman	jacaré	kapɨˈtɨ
69.	caiman egg	ovo de jacaré	kapɨtɨβaˈʧi
70.	lizard	lagarto	ɨˈã
71.	my lizard	meu lagarto	ɨˈã
72.	snake	cobra	ʧuˈlu
73.	anaconda	sucuri	ʧuluʃaˈlu
74.	toad	sapo	ˈkali
75.	frog	rã	kaˈʧa
76.	fish	peixe	ˈmaili
77.	piranha	piranha	ˈmaka
78.	ray	arraia	iˈβaβi
79.	sting of a stingray	ferrão de arraia	iβaβiʧiˈmuʃa
80.	grasshopper	gafanhoto	uruˈku
81.	cockroach	barata	ʧuˈpãlo
82.	termite	cupim	naˈkaʃa
83.	louse	piolho	iˈa
84.	my louse	meu piolho	ˈɨja
85.	your louse	teu piolho	ˈmɨja
86.	her louse	piolho dela	ˈhɨja
87.	louse egg, nit	lêndea	jaˈβaʧi
88.	butterfly	borboleta	koʃkoˈʃa
89.	weevil	gorgulho	paʧaˈli
90.	fly	mosca	napaʃoˈʃo
91.	blackfly	borrachudo	ʃiˈhu
92.	ant	formiga	isiˈsa
93.	anthill	formigueiro	isisaˈna
94.	bee	abelha	naβiˈla
95.	beehive	colméia	naβɨˈlik
96.	honey	mel geral	βuˈna
97.	Uruçu honey	mel uruçu	piʧoβuˈna
98.	tarantula	aranha caranguejeira	parawaˈsa
99.	spider web	teia	haˈpamã
100.	earthworm	minhoca	ˈmuli
101.	slug	lesma	ʧɨˈwa
102.	tree	árvore	hiˈwi
103.	plant	planta	βaˈnaka
104.	grass	capim	waˈsai
105.	forest	mata	ˈlawã
106.	leaf	folha	hiˈmani
107.	twig	galho	haˈpawa
108.	tree branch	galho da árvore	hiwiˈpawa
109.	flower	flor	ˈhiwa
110.	fruit	fruta	ipiˈmi
111.	wood	madeira	ˈhiwi
112.	head	cabeça	βoʃkaˈta
113.	hair	cabelo	waʃkaˈʧani
114.	my hair	meu cabelo	ɨwaʃkaˈʧani
115.	eyes	olho	ˈβuʧu
116.	my eyes	meus olhos	ɨˈβuʧu
117.	your eyes	teu olho	miˈβuʧu
118.	their eyes	olho dele	haˈβuʧu
119.	eyebrow	sobrancelha	ˈβuʃkɨ
120.	eyelash	cílio	βuʃˈpi
121.	nose	nariz	ʧuˈkani
122.	my nose	meu nariz	ɨʧuˈkani
123.	your nose	teu nariz	miʧuˈkani
124.	their nose	nariz dele	haʧuˈkani
125.	our nose	nosso nariz	lõʧuˈkani
126.	your (pl.) nose	nariz de vocês	matõʧuˈkani
127.	their (pl.) nose	nariz deles	hatõʧuˈkani
128.	cheek	bochecha	taˈmo
129.	my cheek	minha bochecha	ɨtaˈmo
130.	mouth	boca	kɨʃaˈka
131.	tooth	dente	ʃɨˈta
132.	my teeth	meus dentes	ɨʃɨˈta
133.	tongue	língua	haˈna
134.	my tongue	minha língua	ɨhaˈna
135.	chin	queixo	kɨniˈma
136.	my chin	meu queixo	ɨkɨniˈma
137.	your chin	teu queixo	mikɨniˈma
138.	their chin	queixo dela	hakɨniˈma
139.	our chin	nosso queixo	lõkɨniˈma
140.	your (pl.) chin	queixo de vocês	matõkɨniˈma
141.	their (pl.) chin	queixo deles	hatõkɨniˈma
142.	beard	barba	kɨmɨˈsi
143.	moustache	bigode	kɨmɨsiˈjoto
144.	nape	nuca	taˈi
145.	throat	garganta	tukaˈʃa
146.	heart	coração	huˈja
147.	my heart	meu coração	ɨhuˈia
148.	belly	barriga	toˈro
149.	stomach	estômago	takaβoˈʧo
150.	elbow	cotovelo	paʃoˈʃo
151.	hand	mão	makaˈli
152.	leg	perna	witaˈʃa
153.	foot	pé	taˈi
154.	toe	dedo do pé	taimiˈtsili
155.	vein	veia	puˈnu
156.	skin	pele	iβiˈʧi
157.	baby	bebê	ʃohupaˈtsi
158.	man	homem	βiˈki
159.	woman	mulher	ˈʃãpi
160.	food	comida	tsaˈsi
161.	salt	sal	ʧiˈra
162.	meat	carne	laˈmi
163.	Brazil nut	castanha do pará	tamapaˈʃa
164.	maize	milho	ʃɨˈkɨ
165.	manioc	mandioca	kɨˈna
166.	banana	banana	laβuˈka
167.	fish toxin	veneno de pescar	ˈwaka
168.	home	casa	ʃumaˈʧa
169.	village	aldeia	maˈhɨ
170.	city	cidade	kariwamaˈhi
171.	hammock (for sleeping)	rede (de dormir)	paˈmɨ
172.	clay cups	copos de barro	kɨlopiˈʃa
173.	plate	prato	kɨˈlo
174.	hoe	enxada	mawiʧiˈta
175.	arrow	flecha	piˈa
176.	fishhook	anzol	tsaˈpi
177.	basket	cesto	paˈnero
178.	baby sling	faixa para carrega nenê	paˈpi
179.	needle	agulha	malɨmuˈʃa
180.	feather ornament	enfeite de penas	patsaˈnu
181.	body painting	pintura corporal	kɨʃuˈma
182.	brush	escova	ʃakiˈlo
183.	bridge	ponte	tãˈlali
184.	path, road	caminho	ɨpaˈi
185.	owner	dono	haiˈki
186.	friend	amigo	hihaˈwa
187.	indigenous person	índio	huˈni
188.	father (my)	pai (meu)	ɨˈpa
189.	my father	meu pai	ɨˈpa
190.	your father	teu pai	mɨˈpa
191.	their father	pai dele	haɨˈpa
192.	mother	mãe	ɨˈwa
193.	mother-in-law	sogra	jaˈja
194.	father-in-law	sogro	kuˈku
195.	grandfather	avô	ʧaˈpa
196.	my grandfather	meu avô	ɨʧaˈpa
197.	your grandfather	teu avô	miʧaˈpa
198.	their grandfather	avô delea	haʧaˈpa
199.	grandmother	avó	ʧiˈʧa
200.	my grandmother	minha avó	ɨʧiˈʧa
201.	your grandmother	tua avó	miʧiˈʧa
202.	their grandmother	avó dele/a	haʧiˈʧa
203.	wife	esposa	itaˈho
204.	my wife	minha esposa	ɨitaˈho
205.	their wife	esposa dele	miitaˈho
206.	son	filho	ʃoˈhu
207.	daughter	filha	ainiʃoˈhu
208.	stepson	enteado	βakaˈhi
209.	my stepson	meu enteado	ɨβakaˈhi
210.	old man	homem velho	ʧaˈpaβa
211.	old woman	mulher velha	ʃuˈmaβi
212.	warrior	guerreiro	huiˈpani
213.	language	língua	huˈi
214.	day	dia	βaˈʧihi
215.	night	noite	jamuˈta
216.	month	mês	ˈɨʃi
217.	year	ano	lɨˈta
218.	yesterday	ontem	muˈɲa
219.	after	depois	taiˈʃu
220.	today	hoje	jalˈtadepois
221.	cloudy	nublado	sikiriˈhi
222.	wet	molhado	jaˈri
223.	dry	seco	puˈo
224.	hot	quente	itsiˈsi
225.	cold	frio	iˈkani
226.	fat	gordo	ʃuˈaki
227.	light	claro	ˈsaʧa
228.	red	vermelho	puˈʃɨ
229.	yellow	amarelo	ʃiˈni
230.	green	verde	iaˈra
231.	hard	duro	tsaˈsi
232.	fast	rápido	ʃaˈhi
233.	old	antigo	hainiˈto
234.	dirty	sujo	ˈʧuʃo
235.	clean	limpo	ʃunaˈna
236.	empty	vazio	kiˈʃi
237.	tall (person)	alto (pessoa)	haʧaˈki
238.	wide	largo	ˈpala
239.	narrow	estreito	hapaˈlamã
240.	large	grande	laˈki
241.	small	pequeno	lakimaˈa
242.	wild	selvagem	honiˈʧa
243.	sad	triste	ʃinãtsamaˈma
244.	happy	alegre	ʃinãtsaˈma
245.	squatting	de cócoras	hoˈloka
246.	lying down	deitado	tsisuˈkɨ
247.	sitting	sentado	tihiˈki
248.	far away	longe	uˈʧa
249.	hungry	faminto	tsasikaˈtsa
250.	salty	salgado	saˈra
251.	to lower	abaixar	haiʧaimaiˈhi
252.	I lower	eu abaixo	ɨhaiʧaimaiˈhi
253.	you lower	você abaixa	mɨhaiʧaimaiˈhi
254.	they lower	ele abaixa	hakahaiʧaimaiˈhi
255.	we lower	nós abaixamos	lohaiʧaimaiˈhi
256.	your (pl.) lower	vocês abaixam	matohaiʧaimaiˈhi
257.	they (pl.) lower	eles abaixam	hatohaiʧaimaiˈhi
258.	to wake up	acordar	witsoˈhi
259.	to sharpen	afiar	kɨnaˈhi
260.	to feed	alimentar	pimaˈhi
261.	to lie down	deitar	tsisohi
262.	to divide	dividir	nataˈʃi
263.	to harvest manioc	tirar macaxeira	kaˈnaβahi
264.	to get sick	adoecer	isaliaˈhi
265.	to drown	afogar-se	haskaˈhi
266.	to become dawn	amanhecer	maikaˈhi
267.	to mature	amadurecer	ˈhãhi
268.	to walk	andar	ˈkãhi
269.	I'm going to walk	eu vou andar	ɨˈkãhi
270.	you're going to walk	você vai andar	miˈkãhi
271.	they're going to walk	ele vai andar	hakaˈkãhi
272.	we're going to walk	nós vamos andar	loˈkãhi
273.	you're (pl.) going to walk	vocês vão andar	matoˈkãhi
274.	they're (pl.) going to walk	eles vão andar	hatoˈkãhi
275.	to rot, decay	apodrecer	paˈtsahi
276.	to get close	chegar perto	oˈʧamihi
277.	to cross (a river)	atravessar (rio)	wakatiˈhi
278.	to fall from a tree	cair da árvore	hipuˈʃu
279.	to fall	cair	wiloˈhi
280.	to get tired	cansar-se	tsasimaiˈhi
281.	to get married	casar-se	hananãhi
282.	to cry	chorar	wiʃaˈhi
283.	to cry (adult)	(adulto) chorar	wiˈlihi
284.	to arrive	chegar	hakipoˈhi
285.	to give food to children	dar comida para criança	ʃohutsasawaˈhi
286.	to rub, scratch	coçar	wiʃanaˈhi
287.	I rub	eu coço	ɨwiʃanaˈhi
288.	I am rubbing	eu estou coçando	ɨwʧanaˈhi
289.	to run	correr	ˈlihi
290.	I run	eu corro	ɨˈlihi
291.	you run	você corre	miˈlihi
292.	they run	ele corre	hakaˈlihi
293.	I ran	eu corri	ɨˈlito
294.	you ran	você correu	miˈlito
295.	they ran	ele correu	hakaˈlito
296.	I'm going to run	eu vou correr	ɨˈlihi
297.	you're going to run	você vai correr	miˈlikahi
298.	they're going to run	ele vai correr	hakaˈlikahi
299.	to grow	crescer	honiʧaˈhi
300.	to sleep	dormir	uʃaˈhi
301.	I sleep	eu durmo	ɨuʃaˈhi
302.	you sleep	você dorme	miuʃaˈhi
303.	they (pl.) sleep	eles dormem	hatouʃaˈhi
304.	you (pl.) sleep	vocês dormem	matouʃaˈhi
305.	to enter	entrar	haʧãhi
306.	to be angry	estar com raiva	noˈtsihi
307.	to be tired	estar cansado	tsatsimaiˈto
308.	to be hungry	estar com fome	tsasikaˈtsa
309.	to stand	ficar em pé	niʧiˈhi
310.	to raise	levantar	βujtsoˈhi
311.	to lift something	levantar algo	iwitsoˈhi
312.	to get wet	molhar	kãlahi
313.	to carry	trazer	βuˈihi
314.	to get sick	adoecer, ficar doente	isaliaˈhi
315.	I get sick	eu fiquei doente	ɨisaliˈato
316.	you get sick	você ficou doente	misaliˈato
317.	we get sick	nós ficamos doentes	loisaliˈato
318.	you (pl.) get sick	vocês ficaram doentes	matoisaliˈato
319.	they (pl.) get sick	eles ficaram doentes	hatoisaliato
320.	to close	fechar	popoˈhi
321.	to flee	fugir	wanaliˈhi
322.	I flee	eu fujo	ɨwanaliˈhi
323.	to yell, scream	gritar	kɨkɨˈhi
324.	to go	ir	ˈkãhi
325.	I go	eu vou	ɨˈkãhi
326.	to die	morrer	kɨʧɨˈhi
327.	to jump	pular	haiaˈhi
328.	to laugh	rir(-se)	kuʧaˈhi
329.	to dry the well	secar o poço	lalaˈhi
330.	to indicate	indicar	mataˈhi
331.	to kill	matar	mataʃaˈhi
332.	to think (about)	pensar (em)	ʃinaˈhi
333.	to eat	comer	piˈhi
334.	I eat	eu como	ɨlpiˈhi
335.	you eat	você come	milpiˈhi
336.	they eat	ele come	halpiˈhi
337.	they ate	ele comeu	halpiˈto
338.	they're going to eat	ele vai comer	halpiˈhi
339.	to fish	pescar	pãtaʃiˈhi
340.	to hug	abraçar	talanaˈhi
341.	to light (fire)	acender (fogo)	ʧitaβaˈhi
342.	to think	achar	witsoˈhi
343.	I think	eu acho	ɨlwitsoˈhi
344.	you think	você acha	milwitsoˈhi
345.	I thought	eu achei	ɨlwitsoˈto
346.	you thought	você achou	milwitsoˈto
347.	to drink	beber	kulaˈhi
348.	to carry on the back	carregar (n)as costas	papiˈhi
349.	to harvest	colher	tsokuhaˈhi
350.	to cook	cozinhar	imaˈhi
351.	to heal	curar	soaˈhi
352.	to peel	descascar	ʃokaˈhi
353.	to dance	dançar	moloˈhi
354.	I dance	eu danço	ɨmoloˈhi
355.	you dance	você dança	mimoloˈhi
356.	they dance	ele dança	hamoloˈhi
357.	to push	empurrar	kuitaˈhi
358.	to teach	ensinar	josiˈhi
359.	to bury	enterrar	maɲaˈhi
360.	to choose	escolher	isˈhi
361.	to hide	esconder	honaˈhi
362.	to listen	escutar	kaˈhi
363.	to shoot with an arrow	flechar	piaˈlihi
364.	to smoke	fumar	kuhaˈhi
365.	to pierce	furar	ʧulawaˈhi
366.	to wash (clothes)	lavar (roupa)	palohiʃuaˈlo
367.	to wash	lavar	paloˈhi
368.	to remember	lembrar	ʃinaˈhi
369.	to send	mandar	ʧãˈhi
370.	to chew	mastigar	noaˈhi
371.	to hear	ouvir	kaˈhi
372.	to ask	pedir	jokaˈhi
373.	to step (on)	pisar (em)	haˈmahi
374.	to name	pôr nome	halajawaˈhi
375.	to twist	torcer	pilohiˈhi
376.	to braid, weave	trançar	majuˈsi
377.	to sweep	varrer	masaˈhi
378.	to thread	enfiar	tsakaˈhi
