= Demushbo language =

Extinct Mayo language of Brazil

Demushbo
- Remo
- Native to: Brazil
- Extinct: early 2010s
- Language family: Panoan: Mayoruna; Mayo; Matis group; Demushbo

Language codes
- ISO 639-3: None (mis)
- Glottolog: demu1235
- ELP: Demushbo

Demushbo (Dëmushbo), or ambiguously Remo, is a recently extinct Panoan language of the Brazilian Amazon basin, near the Peruvian border.
