= Tarauacá Kashinawa language =

Extinct Panoan language of Brazil

Cashinawa
- Kaxinawá
- Native to: Brazil
- Region: Tarauacá River
- Ethnicity: Kaxinawá
- Era: attested 1927
- Language family: Panoan: Mainline Panoan; Nawa; Cashinawa

Language codes
- ISO 639-3: None (mis)
- Glottolog: cash1253

Tarauacá Kashinawa (Cashinahua of the Tarauacá River) is an extinct Indigenous language of the Panoan languages once spoken in the western Brazilian Amazon Basin.
