= Karipuna language =

Several languages that may more or less called "Karipuna" in different roles

"Karipuna" or "Caripuná" has been used in Brazil for languages in the Madeira–Guaporé River region of Rondônia and in the Uaçá River region of Amapá.

In Rondônia, the name originally applied to the Panoan language Jau-Navo, and was the only language there called Karipuna until the 1950s. However, from the 1950s until the 1970s, the name was extended to newly contacted peoples in the region who spoke various dialects of the Tupian Kawahib language. FUNAI started using the name for several Kawahib dialects, creating the current confusion in the region.

In Amapá, the only attested Indigenous language that went by the name was the Arawakan language Palikur. After the assimilation of the original Amapá people, the name was applied to immigrants, now known as the Karipuna do Amapá, whose language was not recorded but was reported to be Nheengatu, a Tupian language. Their recorded language is Karipuna Creole French.

Karipuna is used to refer to:

- Jau-Navo language, or Chakobo (Panoan): the original Karipuna of Guaporé in Rondônia, Brazil; one of two assigned ISO code [kuq]
- Kawahib language (Tupian): the more recently labeled Karipuna of Guaporé in Rondônia, Brazil, also assigned ISO code [kuq]
- Palikúr language (Arawakan): the original language of the Karipuna do Amapá of Brazil and French Guiana, assigned ISO code [plu]
- an unrecorded language, reportedly Nheengatu language (Tupian); the original language of recent immigrants to Amapá, whose original language was also assigned ISO code [kgm] but deprecated in 2023
- Lanc-Patuá creole, otherwise known as Karipuna Creole French; assigned ISO code [kmv]

== See also ==
- Karipuna Indigenous Territory in Rondônia, Brazil
