= Wariapano language =

Nearly extinct Panoan language of Peru

Wariapano
- Pano
- Native to: Peru
- Native speakers: moribund (2013) extinct 1991 (Pano)
- Language family: Panoan: Mainline Panoan; Nawa; Chama; Wariapano
- Dialects: Shetebo; Piskino; Pano †

Language codes
- ISO 639-3: pno
- Glottolog: pano1255
- Panobo is classified as Extinct by the UNESCO Atlas of the World's Languages in Danger.

Wariapano (Huariapano), also known as Pano, Panavarro, and Pánobo, is a nearly extinct Panoan language of Peru. The language has three dialects; one of them is extinct and the two others are nearly so.

== Dialects ==
There are three attested dialects: Shetebo and Piskino, which are no longer in daily use and are considered obsolescent, and Pano itself, which is extinct.

== Classification ==
David Fleck (2013) classified Pano as closely related to extinct Sensi and the still-living Shipibo–Konibo language, as part of the Chama subgroup of the Mainline Panoan languages. The Barbudo, Chakaya, Iltipo, Manannawa, Yawabo, and Puinawa languages, though undocumented, were also reportedly close to Pano. The Wriapano language was reported to be partially intelligible to speakers of Shipibo.

== Geographical distribution ==
In the late 17th century, the Wariapano lived along the Sarayacu River.

== History ==
In 1790, the Wariapano, Shetebo, Shipibo, and Konibo were put into missions by Franciscans. The last known speaker of the Pano dialect died in the spring of 1991.

=== Documentation ===
In 1861, the Franciscan missionaries Frezneda and Francisco de San José are reported to have made a grammar of Shetebo, which was not published. A supposed wordlist of Shetebo was also mentioned. Manuel Navarro presented a list of Pano words . Günter Tessmann recorded 35 words of Shetebo, along with seven additional terms, as well as over 200 words of Pano proper. Piskino is known solely through 14 words included in a 1993 Shipibo dictionary.

== Phonology ==
=== Consonants ===
		Labial	Alveolar	Alveopalatal	Retroflex	Palatal	Velar	Glottal
Plosive		p	t				k	
Affricate			ts	tʃ				
Fricative	voiceless		s	ʃ	ʂ			h
Fricative	voiced	β						
Nasal		m	n					
Flap			ɾ					
Approximant		w				j		

/β/ fluctuates between a stop and a fricative. /h/ is only distinctive word-initially.

=== Vowels ===
	Front	Central	Back
Close	i		ɯ
Mid			o
Open		a	
