= Mayoruna language (Tabatinga) =

Extinct Panoan language of South America

Mayoruna
- Tabatinga Mayoruna
- Native to: Brazil, Peru
- Region: Tabatinga
- Ethnicity: Mayoruna
- Extinct: (date missing)
- Language family: Panoan: Mayoruna; Mayoruna

Language codes
- ISO 639-3: None (mis)
- Glottolog: mayo1272

Tabatinga Mayoruna is an extinct indigenous language of the Amazon basin, on the borders of Brazil and Peru. It is the most divergent of the Mayoruna languages of the Panoan family.
