= Tutxiunaua language =

Extinct Panoan language of Brazil

Tutxiunaua
- Native to: Brazil
- Region: Acre
- Extinct: after 1923
- Language family: Panoan: Mainline Panoan; Nawa; Headwaters; Tutxiunaua

Language codes
- ISO 639-3: tux
- Glottolog: tuxi1238

Tutxiunaua (Tuchiunawa, Tuxinawa) is an extinct Panoan language of Brazil. Its only documentation comes from a list of 127 words collected in 1923.

== Classification ==
According to David Fleck (2013), it closely resembled dialects of Yaminawa.

== History ==
In 1923, the Tutxiunawa people were nearly extinct. That year, a Tutxiunawa woman was encountered; from her, it was confirmed that Tutxiunawa was a Panoan language. A total of 127 words were collected and published in 1929.
