= Sharanawa language =

Panoan language of Peru

Sharanawa
- Sharanahua
- Arara, Sharanahuan tsain
- Native to: Peru
- Ethnicity: Sharanawa
- Native speakers: (450 cited 2000)
- Language family: Pano–Tacanan: Panoan; Amawaka–Jaminawa; Sharanawa
- Dialects: Marinawa; Chandinawa; Mastanawa

Language codes
- ISO 639-3: mcd
- Glottolog: shar1245

Sharanawa (Acre Arara) is a Panoan language of Peru. There are 200 Sharanawa (meaning 'good people') in Brazil, but only 3 speak the language. Its speakers call the language Arara. The Mastanawa dialect may belong to either Sharanawa or Yaminawa, although the Mastanawa regarded their language to be identical with Sharanawa.

== Phonology ==
=== Consonants ===
Sharanawa consonants
	Bilabial	Alveolar	Postalveolar	Retroflex	Palatal	Velar	Glottal
Stop	p	t				k	
Affricate		ts	tʃ				
Fricative	ɸ	s	ʃ^{2}	ʂ^{2}			h^{1}
Nasal	m	n					
Approximant					j	w	
Tap/Flap		ɾ					

1. Pike and Scott (1962) indicate that [h] is velar.
2. [ʃ] and [ʂ] are contrastive only when preceding [a] or [ã].

=== Vowels ===
	Front		Central		Back	
	plain	nasal	plain	nasal	plain	nasal
High	i	ĩ	ɨ	ɨ̃	u	ũ
Low			a	ã		

=== Tone ===
Sharanawa is a tonal language. It distinguishes high tone, marked with an acute accent, and low tone, which is unmarked.
