= Atsawaka language =

Extinct Panoan language of Peru

Atsawaka
- Atsahuaca-Yamiaca
- Native to: Peru
- Region: Carama River
- Extinct: (date missing)
- Language family: Panoan: Mainline Panoan; Nawa; Madre de Dios; Atsawaka
- Dialects: Atsawaka; Yamiaka
- Writing system: Latin

Language codes
- ISO 639-3: atc
- Glottolog: atsa1242

Atswawaka, also called Atsahuaca, or Atsawaka-Yamiaka, is an extinct Panoan language of Peru. Atsahuaca is the name that the tribe calls themselves, meaning "children of the manioc" in their own language. Alternate spellings of the name of the Atswakaka language include: Atsawaka, Atsawaca, Astahuaca, Yamiaca, Yamiaka, Atsawaka-Yamiaka, and Atsahuaca-Yamiaca.

There were 20 speakers in 1904.

== Alphabet ==
The Atswawaka alphabet uses 24 letters commonly, and has 8 characters used for vowels.

Common character(s)	Alternate version	IPA symbol
a		a
e	~~i~~, ï, y	~~i~~
i		i
u	o	ʊ ~ o
an	ã	ã
en	ẽ	ẽ
in	ĩ	ĩ
un	õ	õ
c	k, qu	k
d	r	d
ch	č	tʃ
f		ɸ ~ β
h	j	h
m		m
n		n
p		p
qu		k
r		ɾ
s		s
x	sh, š	ʃ ~ ʂ
t		t
ts		ts
w	hu	w
y		j

== Vocabulary ==
Man - t'harki
Woman - tcinani
Yes - ei
No - tcama
Tea - ita
Tree - isthehowa
