= Hãtxa Kuĩ =

Panoan language of Peru and Brazil

- Kashinawa of the Ibuaçu River, Hantxa Kuin
- Kashinawa, Hantxa Kuin
- Native to: Peru, Brazil
- Ethnicity: Kaxinawá people
- Native speakers: 1,200 (2003–2007)
- Language family: Panoan: Mainline Panoan; Nawa; Headwaters; Hãtxa Kuĩ

Language codes
- ISO 639-3: cbs
- Glottolog: cash1254
- ELP: Cashinahua

Hãtxa Kuĩ (Hantxa Kuin), or Kashinawa (also spelled Kaxinawá, Kashinawa, Kaxynawa, Caxinawa, Caxinawá, and Cashinahua), is an Indigenous American language of western South America which belongs to the Panoan language family. It is spoken by about 1,600 Kaxinawá in Peru, along the Curanja and the Purus Rivers, and in Brazil by 400 Kaxinawá in the state of Acre.

About five to ten percent of speakers have some Spanish language proficiency, while forty percent are literate and twenty to thirty percent are literate in Spanish as a second language.

Dialects are Brazilian Kashinawa, Peruvian Kashinawa, and the extinct Juruá Kapanawa (Capanahua of the Juruá River) and Paranawa.

== Dictionary ==
A dictionary has been compiled and published since 1980.

== Phonology ==
The segmental inventory below is sourced from Kensinger (1963).

=== Vowels ===
	Front		Back	
	oral	nasal	oral	nasal
Close	i	ĩ	u	ũ
Mid			ʌ	ʌ̃
Open	a	ã		

- /a ã/ have the optional allophones [ə ə̃] in phrase-final syllables.
- /u ũ/ are realized as [u ũ] or [o õ] in free variation.

=== Consonants ===
		Labial	Alveolar	Retroflex	Palatal	Velar	Glottal
Nasal		m	n				
Plosive	voiceless	p	t			k	
Plosive	voiced	b	d				
Affricate			ts		tʃ		
Fricative			s	ʂ	ʃ		h
Approximant		w			j		

- /k/ is rarely and optionally voiced [g] in the onsets of unaccented syllables.
- /d/ is realized as [d]:
  - in the onset of the phrase nucleus;
  - as the lengthened consonant following phrase nucleus;
  - in the onset following a closed syllable.
  - Elsewhere, it is in free variation with [ɾ]; the latter is observed more frequently.

== Bibliography ==
- Kaxinawá, Joaquim Paulo de Lima (2014). Para uma gramática da língua Hãtxa kuĩ (Doctoral thesis) (in Portuguese). Recife: Universidade Federal de Pernambuco.
- Kensinger, Kenneth M. (1963). "The phonological hierarchy of Cashinahua (Pano)". In Waterhouse, Viola (ed.). Studies in Peruvian Indian Languages I (PDF). Summer Institute of Linguistics Publications in Linguistics and Related Fields. Vol. 9. Norman, OK: Summer Institute of Linguistics of the University of Oklahoma. pp. 207–217.
