= Nukini language =

Nearly extinct Panoan language of Brazil

Nukini
- Remo
- Nukuini
- Native to: Brazil
- Region: Acre
- Ethnicity: 600 (2012)
- Extinct: late 20th century 3 rememberers (2007)
- Language family: Panoan: Mainline Panoan; Nawa; Poyanawa; Nukini

Language codes
- ISO 639-3: nuc
- Glottolog: nuku1263
- ELP: Nukini
- Nukiní is classified as Extinct by the UNESCO Atlas of the World's Languages in Danger.

Nukini (Nukuini, Nuquini) is an obsolescent Panoan language of Brazil. In some historical texts the Nukini are also referred to as Inucuini, Nucuiny, Nukuini, Nucuini, Inocú-inins and Remo.

As a result of contact with outsiders, there are currently few who speak Nukini as a mother tongue. The Nukini stopped passing on the language to their descendants, and the current generation speaks Portuguese. The language has been taught in schools since 2000.

== Phonology ==
=== Consonants ===
		Bilabial	Labiodental	Alveolar	Palatal	Velar
Occlusive	voiceless	p		t		k
Occlusive	voiced	b				
Nasal		m		n		
Tap				ɾ		
Fricative	voiceless		f	s		x
Fricative	voiced		v			
Approximant		w			j	

== Orthography ==
The language uses 18 letters.
