= Môa Remo language =

Extinct Panoan language of Peru

Remo
- Môa Remo, Rheno
- Pronunciation: [rɯmo]
- Native to: Peru
- Region: Môa River
- Ethnicity: Remo (Panoan)
- Extinct: 1960s
- Language family: Panoan: Mainline Panoan; Nawa; Headwaters group; Remo

Language codes
- ISO 639-3: rem
- Glottolog: remo1248

Remo (Rheno) is an extinct indigenous language once spoken along the Môa River of Amazonas, Peru, one of several Panoan languages to go by that name. It was similar to Amawaka.
