= Shanenawa language =

Panoan language of Brazil

Shaninawa
- Xaninaua
- Native to: Brazil
- Region: Acre
- Native speakers: 23 (2016)
- Language family: Pano–Tacanan: Panoan; Shaninawa

Language codes
- ISO 639-3: swo
- Glottolog: shan1283
- ELP: Shanenawa

Shaninawa (Xaninaua) is a moribund Panoan language of Brazil, spoken by just 23 people in 2016.
