= Katukina language (Panoan) =

Panoan language spoken in Brazil

Waninawa
- (Panoan) Katukína
- Noke Vanna
- Native to: Brazil
- Native speakers: 700 (2010)
- Language family: Panoan: Mainline Panoan; Nawa; Marubo; Waninawa
- Dialects: Olinda; Sete Estreles; Kanamari (Canawari) †

Language codes
- ISO 639-3: knt
- Glottolog: pano1254

Waninawa, also known as Kamanawa and Panoan Katukína, is a Panoan language of Brazil.

Dialects are Katukina of Olinda, Katukina of Sete Estreles, and the extinct Kanamari (Canawari) (cf. Kanamari).

== Phonology ==
=== Vowels ===
Waninawa vowel phones
	Front		Central		Back		
	Oral	Nasal	Oral	Nasal	Oral		Nasal
	Oral	Nasal	Oral	Nasal	unrounded	rounded	
Close	i	ĩ					ũ
Near-close	ɪ	ɪ̃				ʊ	ʊ̃
Close-mid	e	ẽ				o	õ
Mid			ə	ə̃			
Open-mid	ɛ					ɔ	
Near-open			ɐ				
Open					ɑ		

Waninawa vowel phonemes
	Front	Central	Back
Close	i	ɨ	u
Open		a	

=== Consonants ===
Waninawa consonant phonemes
	Bilabial	Dental	Alveolar	Retroflex	Alveopalatal	Palatal	Velar
Occlusive	p	t			tʲ		k
Nasal	m	n				ɲ	
Tap			ɾ				
Affricate			ts				
Fricative	ɛ		s	ʂ	ʃ		
Approximant	w					j	
