= Korubo language =

Endangered Panoan language of Brazil

Korubo
- Cacetero
- dsalala
- Native to: Brazil
- Ethnicity: 250 Korubo (2000)
- Native speakers: 26 (2007)
- Language family: Panoan: Mayoruna; Mayo; Korubo
- Dialects: Korubo; Chankueshbo

Language codes
- ISO 639-3: xor
- Glottolog: koru1247
- ELP: Korubo

Korubo is a nearly extinct Panoan language spoken by the Korubo people of Brazil. There are two dialects, Korubo itself and moribund Chankueshbo.

== Phonology ==
Korubo has 6 vowels: /a, e, i, ɨ, o, u/.

Consonants
	Bilabial	Alveolar		Palatal	Velar	
	Bilabial	plain	lateral	Palatal	plain	labialized
Nasal	m	n				
Plosive	p	t			k	kʷ
Affricate		t͡s		t͡ʃ		
Fricative	β	s	ɬ	ʃ		
Semivowel				j		w
