= Náwa language =

Nearly extinct language of Brazil

Nawa
- Nawa of Môa River
- Native to: Brazil
- Region: Môa River
- Native speakers: moribund (2013)
- Language family: Panoan: Mainline Panoan; Nawa; Poyanawa?; Nawa

Language codes
- ISO 639-3: None (mis)
- Glottolog: nawa1239

Môa Nawa is an obsolescent indigenous language spoken in the Brazilian Amazon Basin. It is a Panoan language, and seems to be close to Poyanawa, but classification is difficult due to a near lack of data – it might not be a distinct language at all.
