= Karipuna language (Panoan) =

Extinct Panoan language

Karipuna
- Eʼloê
- Jaũn Àvo
- Native to: Brazil
- Region: Rondônia
- Ethnicity: Jau-Navo
- Extinct: after 1927
- Language family: Pano-Tacanan: Panoan; Mainline; Nawa; Bolivian Nawa; Karipuna

Language codes
- ISO 639-3: kuq (confuses this language with Tupian Karipuna, a dialect of Kawahíva)
- Glottolog: kari1312

Karipuna is an extinct Panoan language formerly spoken in the state of Rondônia in Brazil. It may have been a dialect of Chácobo. It was also known as Eʼloê, as well as Jau-Navo and Jaunavô, based on the self-denomination Jaũn Àvo. It is primarily known from a number of wordlists recorded by various explorers of the Amazon region, including Johann Natterer and Carl Friedrich Philipp von Martius, as well as by the Rondon Commission.

== Vocabulary ==
The following is a short extract of Martius' larger Karipuna vocabulary, from Keller 1874.

Karipuna	Gloss
oni passna	water
jui	tree
cannati	bow
