= Blanco River Remo language =

Extinct language of Peru

Blanco River Remo
- Native to: Peru
- Region: Blanco River
- Ethnicity: Remo
- Era: attested 1927
- Language family: Panoan: Mainline Panoan; Nawa; Blanco River Remo

Language codes
- ISO 639-3: None (mis)
- Glottolog: remo1250

Blanco River Remo is an extinct indigenous language once spoken in the Peruvian Amazon Basin, near the border with Brazil. It was documented by Father Leuque, the first Remo language ever recorded.
