= Marúbo language =

Panoan language of Brazil

Marúbo
- Native to: Brazil
- Region: Javari River basin
- Ethnicity: Marúbo people
- Native speakers: 1,300 (2006)
- Language family: Panoan: Mainline Panoan; Nawa; Marubo group; Marúbo

Official status
- Official language in: Brazil: Amazonas

Language codes
- ISO 639-3: mzr
- Glottolog: maru1252
- ELP: Marubo

Marúbo is a Panoan language of Brazil.

== Status ==
The Marubo language is considered threatened due to competition with Portuguese.

== Phonology ==
=== Consonants ===
	Labial	Alveolar	Post- alveolar	Palatal	Velar
Stop	p	t			k
Affricate		ts	tʃ		
Fricative	v	s	ʃ		
Nasal	m	n			
Rhotic		ɾ			
Approximant	w			j	

- /v/ can be heard as either [v] or [β].

=== Vowels ===
	Front	Central	Back
High	i ĩ	ɨ ɨ̃	u ũ
Low		a ã	

- /a, ɨ, u/ may also be heard as [ɐ, ɯ, ʊ].
- Vowels may also be nasalized when preceding nasal consonants.

== Grammar ==
Marubo is an agglutinative language with and SOV word order. It has a graded tense system where what tense is used it determined by the distance in time between the time of reference (usually the time of speaking) and the time in which the mentioned even happened. Marubo, unlike most Panoan languages, does not have prefixes to refer to various body parts.

== Sample text ==
English	Marubo
In the beginning was the Word, and the Word was with God, and the Word was God.	Txitavíanamã, mai shoviti vevo,“Vana” atõ aká ivo ayase.^{a} Aa Vanaro yora ikítõ ikí Yové Koĩnĩ nióti. Aaivo Vanaro Yové Koĩserívi
