= Jaquirana Remo language =

Extinct Panoan language of Brazil

Jaquirana Remo
- Native to: Brazil
- Region: Jaquirana River
- Ethnicity: Remo
- Extinct: (date missing)
- Language family: Panoan: Mainline Panoan; Nawa; Poyanawa; Jaquirana Remo

Language codes
- ISO 639-3: None (mis)
- Glottolog: remo1249

Jaquirana Remo is an extinct indigenous language once spoken in the Brazilian Amazon Basin, near the border with Peru.
