= Poyanawa language =

Nearly extinct Panoan language spoken in Brazil

Puinaua
- Poyanáwa
- Ûdikuî
- Native to: Brazil
- Region: Acre
- Ethnicity: 745 Puyanawa (2014)
- Native speakers: 1 (2023)
- Revival: 1985–2000
- Language family: Panoan: Mainline Panoan; Nawa; Poyanawa group; Puinaua

Language codes
- ISO 639-3: pyn
- Glottolog: poya1241
- ELP: Poyanawa

Puinaua (Poyanáwa: Ûdikuî, meaning 'true language'), a.k.a. Poyanáwa, is a Panoan language of Brazil. It is nearly extinct, with only one fluent speaker, 92-year-old Railda Manaitá as of 2023.

== Phonology ==
=== Consonants ===
		Bilabial	Labiodental	Alveolar	Palatal	Velar	Glottal
Occlusive	voiceless	p		t		k	
Occlusive	voiced	b		d			
Fricative	voiceless			s	ʃ		h
Fricative	voiced	β	v				
Affricate				ts	tʃ		
Nasal		m		n			
Vibrant				r			
Semivowel		w			j		

=== Vowels ===
	Front	Central	Back
	unrounded		rounded
Close	i	ɨ	u
Mid	e		o
Open		a	
