= Panoan languages =

Family of languages spoken in Peru, western Brazil, and Bolivia

Panoan
- Geographic distribution: southwestern Amazon
- Native speakers: 40,000–50,000 (2013)
- Linguistic classification: Pano–Tacanan: Panoan
- Subdivisions: Mayoruna; Mainline

Language codes
- Glottolog: pano1256
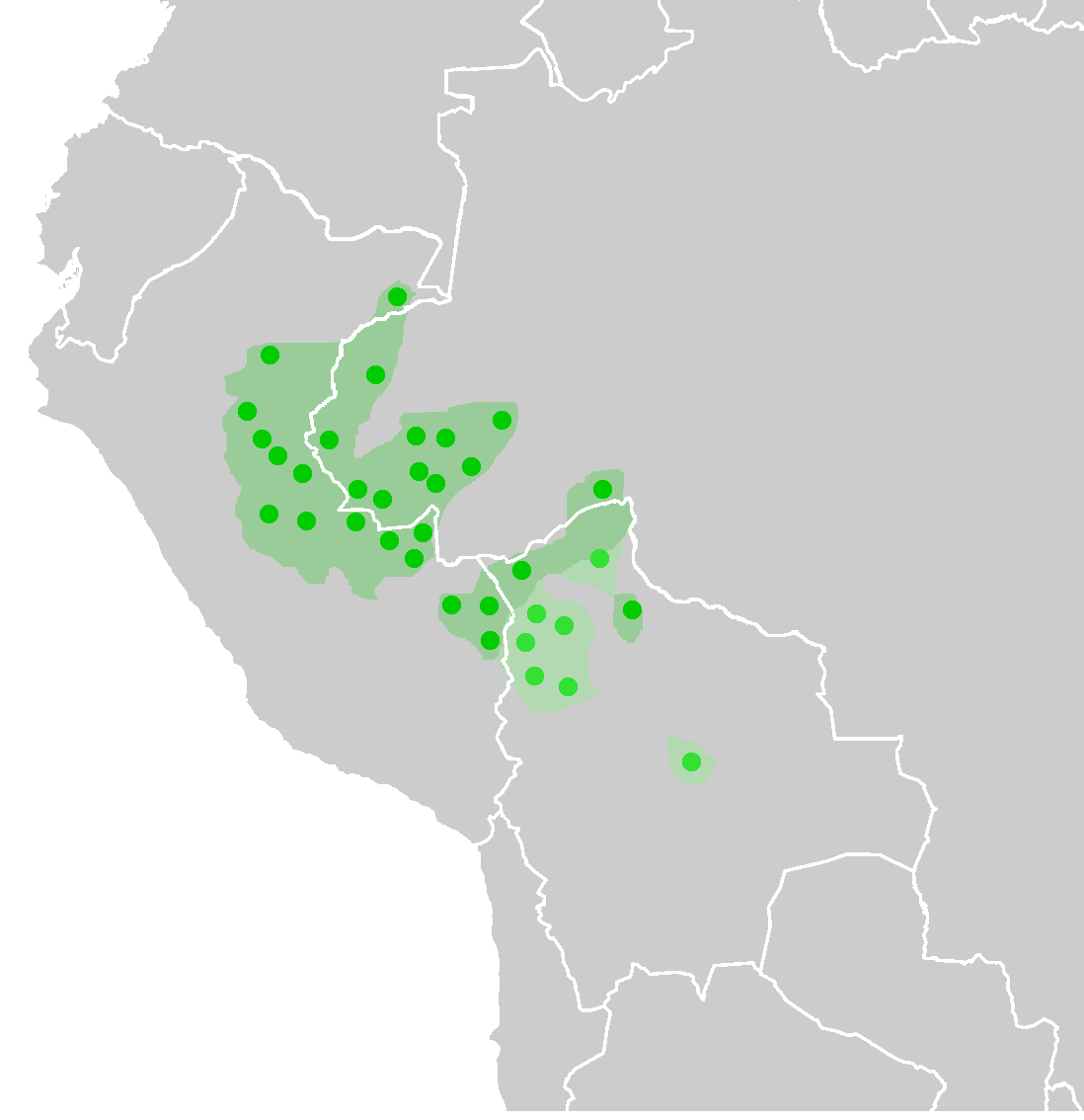
- Panoan languages (dark green) and Takanan languages (light green). Spots indicate documented locations.

Panoan (also Pánoan, Panoano, Panoana, Páno) is a family of languages spoken in western Brazil, eastern Peru, and northern Bolivia. It is a branch of a larger Pano–Tacanan family.

== Genetic relations ==
The Panoan family is generally believed to be related to the Tacanan family, forming with it Pano-Tacanan, though this has not yet been established (Loos 1999).

== Language contact ==
Jolkesky (2016) notes that there are lexical similarities with the Kechua, Mapudungun, Moseten-Tsimane, Tukano, Uru-Chipaya, Harakmbet, Arawak, Kandoshi, and Pukina language families due to contact.

== Languages ==
There are some 18 extant and 14 extinct Panoan languages. In the list of Panoan languages below adapted from Fleck (2013), (†) means extinct, and (*) obsolescent (no longer spoken daily). Dialects are listed in parentheses.

=== Fleck (2013) ===
- Panoan
  - Mayoruna
    - Tabatinga Mayoruna [most divergent] †
    - Mayo
      - Matses
        - Matses (Peruvian Matses, Brazilian Matses, Paud Usunkid^{†})
        - Kulino (of Curuça)* (Kapishtana*, Mawi*, Chema*)
        - Demushbo †
      - Korubo (Korubo, Chankueshbo*)
      - Matis
        - Matis
        - Jandiatuba Mayoruna †
        - Amazon Mayoruna † (two dialects)
  - Mainline Panoan
    - Kasharari [most divergent]
    - Kashibo (Kashibo, Rubo/Isunbo, Kakataibo, Nokaman)
    - Nawa branch (from least to most divergent)
      - Bolivian
        - Chokobo/Pakawara (Chokobo, Pakawara)
        - Karipuna [possibly a dialect of Chokobo-Pakawara] †
        - ? Chiriba †
      - Madre de Dios †
        - Atsawaka-Yamiaka † (Atsawaka, Yamiaka)
        - Arazaire †
      - Blanco River Remo †
      - Tarauacá Kashinawa †
      - Marubo
        - Marubo [of the Javari Basin]
        - Katukina (or Waninawa: Katukina of Olinda, Katukina of Sete Estrelas, Kanamari^{†})
        - Olivença Kulina
      - Poyanawa*
        - Poyanawa †
        - Iskonawa*
        - Nukini †
        - ?Môa Nawa* [tentative due to lack of data]
        - Jaquirana Remo †
      - Chama
        - Shipibo (Shipibo-Konibo, Tapiche Kapanawa*)
        - Pano* (Pano †, Shetebo*, Piskino*)
        - Sensi †
      - Headwaters
        - Ibuaçu Kashinawa (Brazilian Kashinawa, Peruvian Kashinawa, Juruá Kapanawa^{†}, Parannawa^{†})
        - Yaminawa (Brazilian Yaminawa dialects, Peruvian Yaminawa, Chaninawa, Chitonawa, Mastanawa, Parkenawa (= Yora), Shanenawa, Sharanawa/Marinawa, Shawannawa (= Arara), Yawanawa, Yaminawa-arara*, Nehanawa^{†})
        - Amawaka (Peruvian Amawaka, Nishinawa^{†}, Yumanawa^{†})
        - Môa Remo † (resembles Amawaka)
        - Tuchinawa † (resembles Yaminawa dialects)

Boundaries between the Poyanawa, Chama, and Headwaters groups are somewhat blurred. Karipuna and Môa River Nawa may not be distinct languages, and Chiriba may not be Panoan at all.

Hundreds of other Panoan "languages" have been reported in the literature. These are names of groups that may have been ethnically Panoan, but whose language is unattested. They sometimes are assumed to be Panoan on no other evidence than that the name ends in -nawa or -bo. A few, such as Maya (Pisabo), are unattested but reported to be mutually intelligible with a known Panoan language (in this case Matsés). The people speaking one of these supposed languages, Kontanáwa (Kuntanawa), was rediscovered in 1987, reported bilingual in their language and Portuguese. However, no linguistic information is available, and it is not known if they speak a distinct language.

=== Amarante Ribeiro (2005) ===
Classification of the Panoan languages according to Amarante Ribeiro (2005):

- Panoan
  - Group I
    - Amawaka
  - Group II
    - Subgroup II-1
      - Kashibo
      - Nokaman
    - Subgroup II-2
      - Shipibo
      - Kapanawa
      - Panobo
  - Group III
    - Subgroup III-1
      - Iskonawa
      - Kaxinawa
    - Subgroup III-2
      - Subgroup III-2-1
        - Nukini
        - Remo
      - Subgroup III-2-2
        - Subgroup III-2-2-1
          - Kanamari
          - Katukina
          - Marubo
        - Subgroup III-2-2-2
          - Mastanawa
          - Tuxinawa
          - Yoranawa
          - Sharanawa
          - Shanenawa
          - Arara
          - Yawanawa
          - Xitonawa
          - Yaminawa
      - Subgroup III-2-3
        - Kaxarari
        - Poyanawa
  - Group IV
    - Subgroup IV-1
      - Kapishto
      - Matsés
      - Kulina
      - Matis
    - Subgroup IV-2
      - Atsawaka
      - Arazaire
      - Yamiaka
    - Subgroup IV-3
      - Karipuna
      - Chacobo
      - Pakawara

=== Oliveira (2014) ===
Internal classification by Oliveira (2014: 123):

- Panoan
  - Group 1: Kashíbo
  - Group 2
    - Shípibo-Kónibo, Kapanáwa
    - Marúbo (?)
  - Group 3: Chákobo, Kaxararí (?)
  - Group 4: Yamináwa, Chanináwa, Sharanáwa
  - Group 5: Shanenáwa, Katukína
  - Group 6: Poyanáwa (?), Amawáka
  - Group 7
    - Kaxinawá, Marináwa
    - Yawanawá
  - Group 8: Mayorúna, Matís, Korúbo

=== Jolkesky (2016) ===
Internal classification by Jolkesky (2016):

(† = extinct)

- Pano
  - Pano, Northern
    - Kulina (Pano)
    - Korubo
    - Matis
    - Matses
    - Pisabo
  - Pano, Nuclear
    - Kasharari
    - Pano, Western
      - Kashibo, Kakataibo
      - Nokaman †
    - Pano, Central
      - Purus
        - Amawaka
        - Kashinawa
        - Yaminawa-Iskonawa-Marinawa: Iskonawa, Marinawa, Yaminawa; Yawanawa
      - Jurua
        - Kanamari (Pano)
        - Katukina (Pano)
        - Marubo
      - Nukini-Remo
        - Nukini
        - Remo †
        - Poyanawa
      - Atsawaka †
        - Arazaeri †
        - Atsawaka †
        - Yamiaka †
      - Chakobo
        - Chakobo
        - Karipuna (Pano)
        - Pakawara
      - Shipibo-Kapanawa
        - Kapanawa
        - Shipibo-Wariapano: Sensi †; Wariapano; Shipibo

=== Homonyms ===
Much of the confusion surrounding Panoan languages is the number of homonyms among different languages. The principal ambiguous names are as follows:

Panoan languages with the same name
Name	Location or other name	Language
Kapanawa	on the Tapiche	dialect of Shipibo-Konibo
Kapanawa	on the Juruá	dialect of Ibuaçu Kashinawa
Kashinawa	on the Ibuaçu	Headwaters group
Kashinawa	on the Tarauacá	Mainline branch
Kulina	on the Curuçá	Mayoruna branch
Kulina	of São Paulo de Olivençá	Mainline branch
Marubo	in the Javari Basin	Mainline branch
Marubo	of Maucallacta [no data]	Mayoruna branch
Remo	on the Blanco	Nawa group
Remo	on the Môa	Headwaters group
Remo	on the Jaquirana	Poyanawa group
Remo	Southern Remo [no data]	Chama group
Sinabo	of the Mamoré	Bolivian group
Sinabo	of the Ucayali Basin	Chama group
Katukina	Waninawa	Marubo group
Katukina	of Feijo' (Shanenawa)	dialect of Yaminawa
Nawa	on the Môa [little data]	Poyanawa group
Nawa	Parkenawa	dialect of Yaminawa
Maroyuna	(various)	three languages in list above
Maroyuna	Mates	Mates
Maroyuna	Barbudo [no data]	Chama group
Demushbo		Matses group
Demushbo	Chema	dialect of Curuçá Kulina

Neighboring languages of other families may also share the names of Panoan language. The table below ignores other homonyms further afield:

Non-Panoan languages with the same names as Panoan languages
Family	Language
Arawakan	Kanamari, Kasharari, Kunibo, Mayoruna, Pakaguara
Takanan	Chama, Arasa, Atsahuaca, Yamiaka
Katukinan	Katukina, Kanamari
Tupian	Karipuna, Katukinarú
Arawan	Kulina, Arawá
Harakmbut	Arasairi

== Grammatical features ==
=== Body-part prefixation ===
Exceptional to Panoan languages' predominantly suffixal morphology are sets of approximately 30 morphemes primarily referring to parts or features of prototypical human and animal bodies (and, by analogical extension, of botanicals, manufactures, landscapes, and abstract space) which have been found to occur in almost all attested languages of the family (Fleck 2006: 59; Ferreira 2007, 2008; Amarante Ribeiro and Cândido 2008; Zariquiey and Fleck 2012: 385–386).

That these monosyllabic forms are productively affixed to the front of verbal, nominal, or adjectival roots has led many Panoanists to describe them as prefixes (e.g. Prost 1967 and Zingg 1998 [for Chakobo]; Faust 1973, Loriot et al. 1993, and Valenzuela 2003 [for Shipibo-Konibo]; Hyde 1980 [for Amawaka]; Eakin 1991[for Yaminawa]), while the forms' resemblance and loose semantic correspondence to unbound, polysyllabic 'body-part terms' has led others to describe them as incorporated nouns (e.g. Loos 1999). More recent and detailed analyses of this feature in Matses (Fleck 2006) and Kashibo-Kakataibo (Zariquiey and Fleck 2012) have demonstrated that most body-part prefixes in these languages are not readily analyzable as synchronic allomorphs of the nouns they resemble.

Many Panoan body-part prefixes semantically encompass a wide range of extended meaning. In Matses, for example, the prefix an- corresponds to the nouns ana 'mouth, tongue, palm (of hand), sole (of foot), (arm)pit'; anmaëşh 'gill slits (of fish)'; and anşhantuk 'swampy depression in the ground'; but can itself be glossed also as 'cavity, concave surface, interior, underside'; and 'center (of path of stream)' (Fleck 2006: 64). In the examples below, the prefix an- with the verb root kiad 'learn' expresses the learning of a specifically 'oral activity' while the prefix më- 'hand, mortar, forearm, wrist, projecting carpal bones, elbow, finger, knuckles, fingernail, branch' expresses the learning of a specifically 'manual' one:

an-kiad-o-bi
mouth-learn-PAST-1S
'I learned with respect to (my) mouth', i.e., 'I learned an oral activity' (a language, to speak, a song, to sing, to recite the alphabet, to whistle, to eat a type of food, etc.) (Fleck 2006: 78)

më-kiad-o-bi
hand-learn-PAST-1S
'I learned to weave, write, do math problems, fire shotgun, fletch arrows, or other manual tasks' (Fleck 2006: 78)

The following example illustrates how an- can express locative information in non-corporeal, topographical space:

nëid-ø an-san-aşh we-ta ø ke-pa-ak ka-denne-k ke-onda-şh
this.one-ABS center-put:PL.O-after:S/A>S lie-IMP 3.ABS say-TOP.CONT-NARR.PAST tell-REM.PAST.IND tell-DIST.PAST-3
'"Put this one in the middle [of the path] and then lie down!" he [the moon] said, they used to tell, I was told' (Fleck 2006: 80).

While body-part prefixes in Kashibo-Kakataibo, as in Matses, are highly productive with verbs, they are used regularly with only a modest array of adjectives and nouns (Fleck 2006: 72; Zariquiey and Fleck 2012: 394–5). Zariquiey and Fleck (2012: 394) note that the Kashibo-Kakataibo "words for 'skin', 'hair', and 'flesh'" are regularly prefixed:

kapë të-şhaka mëra-aşh ...
caiman neck-skin.ABS find-S/A>S {}
'finding the caiman's neck skin ...' (Zariquiey and Fleck 2012: 395).

Due to the paucity of detailed studies of Panoan body-part prefixes, explanations of their grammaticalization remain largely speculative. Fleck has hypothesized that "Panoan (verb) prefixation evolved from past noun incorporation that co-existed with noun-noun and noun-adjective compounding that involved synchronic reduction of body-part roots" (2006: 92). In light of their analysis of Kashibo-Kakataibo prefixation, Zariquiey and Fleck present two diachronic scenarios to orient future comparative work: "(1) prefixation evolved from productive noun incorporation (prefixes have come from longer body-part nouns); or (2) Proto-Panoan body-part terms were monosyllabic forms that became bound, and most of the current body-part terms were later built up from these" (2012: 408).

== Proto-language ==
Proto-Panoan
- Reconstruction of: Panoan languages

Below are Proto-Panoan reconstructions by de Oliveira (2014). For the full list of original Portuguese glosses, see the corresponding Portuguese article.

Proto-Panoan reconstructions by de Oliveira (2014)

gloss	Proto-Panoan
'sun'	*βaɽi
'star'	*wis(...)
'corn'	*ʂɨki
'to make, to kill'	*ʔak-
'capybara'	*ʔamɨ(n)
'big, large'	*ʔani
'paca (Cuniculus paca)'	*ʔano
'intransitive concord suffix'	*-ʔaʂ
'kind of poison'	*ʔaʂ(an)-
'tapir (Tapirus terrestris)'	*ʔawaɽ
'woman, wife'	*ʔawi(n)
'woman'	*ʔaw̆iβo
'to swallow, to inhale'	*ʔaya-
'I (1sg)'	*ʔɨ
'big, large'	*ʔɨwa
'louse'	*ʔia
'lake'	*ʔian
'owner'	*ʔiʔβo
'bird species'	*ʔiʔtsak
'hot, heat'	*ʔitsis
'heat, hot'	*yoʔo
'hot'	*ʂa(n)a
'to embrace, to keep in one's arms'	*ʔikok-
'to keep/carry in one's arms'	*ʔikoʔiko-
'to rise, to go up'	*ʔira-
'livestock, domestic animal'	*ʔinak
'to give'	*ʔinar-
'jaguar species'	*ʔi(n)o
'fish species (of family Loricariidae)'	*ʔipo
'pain, to hurt'	*ʔisir-
'blackbird species (of family Icteridae)'	*ʔisko
'monkey species (of family Atelidae)'	*ʔiso
'monkey species'	*ɽiɽo
'howler monkey (monkey species)'	*ɽoʔo
'monkey species'	*ʃiro
'monkey species (Callitrichidae?)'	*sipi
'monkey species'	*wasa
'to run'	*ʔisto-
'very, much'	*ʔitsak
'king vulture'	*ʔiʃmi(n)
'heavy'	*ʔiwɨ
'stingray'	*ʔiwi
'tick'	*hoʔpoʂ
'rain'	*ʔoi
'to look'	*ʔoi(n)-
'to cough'	*ʔok(o)-
'to know, to learn'	*ʔo(n)a(n)-
'freshwater (lit. new liquid)'	*ʔoma-paʂa
'to laugh'	*ʔosa(n)-
'to sleep'	*ʔoʂ(a)-
'shadow'	*ʔota
'to suck'	*ʔoyo-
'he, that'	*ha(a)
'to run, to flee'	*haβa(t)-
'heron species'	*haka
'to tread (on)'	*hamak-
'tongue'	*hana
'to vomit'	*ha(n)a(n)-
'name'	*harɨ
'curassow (bird species of family Cracidae)'	*hãsi(n)
'opening'	*hãʂaβa
'this much'	*hatit
'3PL'	*hato
'what, which'	*haw(ɨ/a)
'his, her(s)'	*hawɨn
'path, way, forest trail'	*βaʔi
'night, dark'	*βaʔki(ʃ)i
'dark, night'	*yamɨ(t)
'cloth (?)'	*βatʃi
'grazed, cleared'	*βai(C)
'son, child'	*βakʷɨ
'foam'	*βakoʂ
'to plant'	*βana-
'egg'	*βatsi
'to whisper'	*βaʂɨʂɨ-
'sweet'	*βata
'fish species'	*βato(m)
'parrot (species of family Psittacidae)'	*βawa
'fish species (Pseudoplatystoma corruscans)'	*βawi(n)
'to fetch, to search'	*βɨ-
'comitative'	*-βɨt, *-bɨta(n)
'boy, adolescent'	*βɨʔra(C)
'to forget, to lose'	*βɨʔ(n)oÇ
'tear'	*βɨʔo(m)
'waves'	*βɨʔʃo(n)
'forehead, face'	*βɨmãnan
'husband, male'	*βɨnɨ
'man, male'	*βɨ̃βo
'tree species (of family Phyllanthaceae)'	*βɨp(on)
'eye'	*βɨɽo
'to cut'	*βɨstɨ-
'eyebrows'	*βɨʂko
'eyebrows'	*βɨʂpi
'frog species'	*βɨʂko
'thin, flat'	*βɨʂ(n)a(n)
'soup, broth'	*βɨtɨm
'face (body part prefix)'	*βɨ-
'to catch'	*βiÇ-
'skin, leather, hide'	*βitsi
'heron species'	*βitʃo
'mosquito species'	*βi
'fruit'	*βimi
'wasp'	*βira
'moriche palm (Mauritia vinifera)'	*βinon
'guava'	*βĩpiʃ
'pluralizer'	*-βo
'woodpecker species (of family Picidae)'	*βoir
'kind of box'	*βoʔ(n)a(n)-ti
'palm species'	*βoʔɽɨ(t)
'stump, trunk'	*βoʔɽo(Ç)
'fish species (of family Pimelodidae)'	*βoɨ
'resin'	*βoi(Ç)
'tree species (Cecropia?)'	*βoko(n)
'a small tree whose bark is used to make ropes'	*βoko
'bee species'	*βo(n)a
'hair, coat'	*βo
'kind of beetle'	*βõpa
'otter species'	*βõsi(m)
'head'	*βoʂka(Ç)
'to sit (down)'	*tsaʔo(t)-
'fish species'	*tsatsa
'hiccup, to hiccup'	*tsɨko-
'cicada'	*tsiʔo
'charcoal, ember'	*tsitsɨ
'ember, firewood charcoal'	*(ts)is(t)o
'who'	*tso(a)
'to catch, to grab with the hand'	*tsoma-
'to sting, to pierce, to inject'	*tʃaʔtʃi-
'to crush, to beat, to hit'	*tʂaka-
'to lie'	*tʃa(n)i-
'clam species'	*tʃãpiʃ
'cricket, locust'	*tʂãpo
'kingfisher'	*tʃaɽaʂ
'deer species'	*tʂaʂo
'fire'	*tʃiʔi
'ashes (lit. fire dust)'	*tʃiʔi mapo
'to steer (a canoe) from behind'	*tʃiβi-
'rear part'	*tʃipo
'to wash, to wash oneself'	*tʃoka-
'cloth, clothes'	*tʃopa
'hard, strong'	*tʃoɽiʃ
'hard, strong'	*kɨɽɨʂ
'liquid, water'	*hɨ(n)ɨ
'fish species'	*hɨ(n)ɨ ʔino
'to leave, to let go of'	*hɨ(n)ɨÇ
'palm species'	*hɨpɨ
'to shine, to burn'	*hɨɽɨ-
'to put out (fire)'	*(n)oka-
'seed'	*hɨʂɨ
'to enter'	*hiʔki-
'ant species'	*hiʔima
'ant species'	*hi(ts)i
'blood'	*himi
'tail'	*hina
'to see, to look'	*his-
'kind of ant'	*hitsis
'to urinate, urine'	*hisor-
'kind of tree as well as its fruit'	*hiʃtʃiβi
'tree (generic), log (generic)'	*hiwi-
'to hear, to listen, to understand'	*kʷak-
'edge, lips'	*kʷɨβi
'Penelope (bird species)'	*kʷɨβo
'to want, to desire'	*kʷɨ̃ɨ̃-
'to want'	*katsi, *-kas
'to love, to like, to want'	*(n)oi-
'to call'	*kʷɨ(n)a-
'kind of bench'	*kʷɨ(n)a(n)
'to draw, to paint'	*kʷɨ(n)ɨ-
'beard'	*kʷɨ(n)i
'end, extreme'	*kʷɨ(n)o-
'to skewer'	*kʷɨo(n)-
'lips'	*kʷɨʂa(n)
'beard'	*kʷɨʂ(n)i
'macaw species'	*kaʔi(n)
'back'	*kaʔtɨ
'relative'	*ka(n)i
'kind of basket'	*kaka(n)
'pineapple'	*ka(n)
'jaguar'	*kamar
'snake species'	*kaʔmoʂ
'macaw species'	*kara
'flash of lightning'	*karak
'bow'	*kano-
'kind of squirrel'	*kapa
'cayman'	*kapɨt
'cará (kind of yam)'	*kaɽi
'firewood'	*kaɽo
'mat'	*kaʃi
'back (body part prefix)'	*ka-
'to sew'	*kɨʔʂɨ-
'vessel, dish, plate'	*kɨ̃tʃa(C)
'piece, shard'	*kɨʂɨ
'thick'	*kɨʂto(C)
'kind of pan'	*kɨ̃ti(C)
'to end, to finish'	*kɨyo-
'locative ablative suffix, directional, towards'	*-ki
'hole, opening'	*kiri
'thigh'	*kʷisi
'smoke'	*kʷaʔin
'to boil'	*koβi(n)-
'jaw'	*kʷi
'mother's brother'	*koka
'glowworm'	*koki(ʃ)
'mother's brother'	*koko
'to swallow soft food'	*koko-
'glowworm'	*koko(ʃs)i-
'tinamou (bird species)'	*koma
'fungus species'	*ko(n)o
'pus'	*ko
'value'	*kopi
'ashes, greyish'	*koɽo
'cedar'	*(k)oʂna
'causative verbal suffix'	*-m(a)-
'hill'	*maʔtʃi
'fish species'	*maʔi(r)
'cold'	*matsi
'to sweep'	*matso-
'animal horn'	*mãtʃa(n)
'earth, land'	*mai
'on earth, on the ground'	*mai(n)
'to bury'	*mai(n)-, *maiwa-
'headband, hat'	*maiti
'rat'	*maka
'rat'	*ʂoya
'stone, rock'	*maka
'piranha (fish species)'	*makɨ
'to wish'	*mara-
'over, about'	*ma(n)a(n)
'metal'	*ma(n)ɨ
'banana'	*ma(n)i
'to long'	*(ma)(n)o(t)-
'to climb (a hill)'	*mapɨ-
'shrimp'	*mapi
'head'	*mapo
'clay, dust'	*mapok
'plant species'	*maɽaʂ
'agouti (rodent species)'	*maɽi
'calabash species'	*masɨ(n)
'sand'	*masi
'stone'	*maʂaʂ
'urucum (the tree and its fruit)'	*maʂɨ
'on top, peak'	*maʂka(t)
'to cut hair'	*maʂkoɽ-
'animal horn'	*mãʂo
'to hit the head'	*matas
'to die'	*mawa-
'ant species'	*mawis
'to twist, to spin, to move in circles'	*maya-
'to touch, to touch with the hand, to feel'	*mɨʔ(ɨ)-
'to wet, wet'	*mɨʔtʃa-
'hand, arm'	*mɨβi
'fingernail'	*mɨ̃tsis
'claw, nail'	*hõtsis
'hand'	*mɨkɨr
'right hand'	*mɨkɨrɨ kʷaya
'to find, to look for'	*mɨɽa-
'to crawl'	*mɨʂo
'finger'	*mɨtoti
'slough, muddy area'	*mɨwɨ
'2SG'	*mi
'2PL'	*mato
'pamonha (traditional corn pastry)'	*mɨsi
'hook, fishhook'	*miʃkiti
'poison, bitter'	*moka
'thorn'	*moʂa
'nest'	*naʔa
'sloth species'	*naʔir
'sky'	*naiɽ
'mosquito species'	*(n)akʷa
'termite'	*nakʷaʂɨ
'to dream'	*(n)ama-
'below, under, underneath'	*nama
'meat'	*rami
'genipap (kind of fruit)'	*(n)a(n)ɨ
'to put inside, to submerge'	*nan(ɨ)-
'inside, in the middle'	*(n)apo
'to bathe, to take a bath'	*(n)as(i)-
'wide, broad'	*(n)aʂβa
'to bite'	*(n)atɨʂ-
'foreigner'	*(n)awa
'rainbow'	*(n)awa βaʔi
'cut vegetation, abandoned land'	*(n)awɨ
'trumpeter bird'	*(n)ɨa
'to unite, to put together'	*(n)ɨʔa-
'to tie'	*(n)ɨʂa-
'bird species'	*(n)ɨʂ(n)ɨʂ
'day'	*rɨtɨ
'to stand'	*niÇ
'forest, woods'	*(n)iʔi
'breeze'	*(n)iβiÇ
'centipede, scorpion'	*(n)iβo
'to listen, to hear'	*(n)ĩka
'to drag, to pull'	*(n)i(n)-
'to sweat'	*(n)iska(n)-
'palm species'	*(n)isi
'to be bored'	*(n)iʃ-
'wind'	*(n)iwɨ
'1PL'	*no(-)
'deep'	*(n)oa-
'snail species'	*(n)oʔtʃo
'worm'	*noʔir
'snail species'	*(n)oβo
'tasty, delicious'	*(n)o(ɨ)
'to swim'	*(n)on(a)-
'to swim'	*nono-
'duck'	*rorom
'canoe'	*(n)õti
'to fly'	*(n)o(ya)-
'to come, to arrive'	*ho-
'flower'	*hoa
'language, voice, word'	*hoi
'to breathe'	*hoin
'heart'	*hoi(n)ti
'to hide'	*hon(ɨ)-
'man, human'	*honi
'wild hog species'	*ho(n)o
'red'	*hoʃin
'white'	*hoʂo
'to wash'	*paʔtsa-
'to get drunk, drunk'	*paʔɨn-
'deaf'	*paβɨ
'ear'	*paβĩki
'bamboo species (Guadua weberbaueri, taboca)'	*paka
'to fall'	*pakɨt-
'armadillo species'	*paɨ(n)o
'ear adornment, earring'	*pa(ʔ)o(t)
'father'	*papa
'to deceive'	*paɽa(n)-
'river'	*paɽo
'ear (body part prefix)'	*pa-
'yellow'	*pãʃin
'new, fresh, raw'	*paʂa
'blossoming small branch on a stem'	*paʂko
'deaf'	*pãtot
'to shake'	*paya-
'rotten'	*payo
'wing, feather'	*pɨʔi
'to eat'	*pi-
'nephew, son of one's sister'	*piʔak
'arrow'	*pia
'parakeet'	*pitso
'hummingbird'	*pi(n)o
'toucan species'	*pisa
'cujubi(m) (Pipile cujubi, bird species), wild turkey'	*koʂo
'large toucan species'	*ʂokɨ
'snake species'	*pisika
'small bag (?)'	*piʃa
'mat'	*piʃi(n)
'small'	*pistia
'food'	*piti
'feces'	*poʔi-
'kind of tubercle (yam?)'	*poa
'sister or brother of the opposite sex'	*poi
'intestine, belly'	*poko
'vein'	*pono
'owl species'	*popo
'sloth species'	*posɨ(n)
'ankle'	*poʂko
'to throw, to abandon'	*pota-
'dust'	*poto
'arm'	*poyam
'during, while'	*ɽaʔma
'remedy, drug, traditional medicine'	*ɽaʔo
'to be afraid, to get scared'	*ɽaʔtɨ-
'two'	*ɽaβɨt
'to be ashamed'	*ɽaβi(n)-
'knee, kneecap'	*ɽãβoʂo(ko)
'to fear, to be afraid of'	*ɽakʷɨ-
'to lie down'	*ɽaka-
'to cover, to surround'	*ɽako-
'body hair, coat'	*ɽani
'knee'	*ɽa(n)toko-
'to kill'	*ɽɨʔtɨ-
'end, headwater (?) ("ponta, cabeceira do rio")'	*ɽɨβo
'forward, upwards (of river)'	*ɽɨβo+ki
'hole in nose, nostril'	*ɽɨ+kini
'to grind'	*ɽɨnɨ-
'nasal septum'	*ɽɨpaC
'to knock down, to fall over'	*ɽɨɽ-
'musical instrument'	*ɽɨwɨ
'equal, the same way, also'	*-ɽiʔβi, *ɽiʔβa
'thread, string, cord'	*ɽisiβitʃi
'thread'	*ɽisis
'axe'	*ɽoɨ
'tobacco'	*ɽomɨ
'snake'	*ɽoro
'to be on a diet, to fast'	*sama-
'to lift, to suspend'	*sa(n)á(n)-
'fish species'	*sa(n)í(n)
'kind of small fish'	*sani(n)
'to put on clothes, to dress'	*sawɨÇ-
'fierce'	*si(n)a
'coati species (Nasua nasua)'	*sisi
'good, pretty'	*ʃaɽa
'chest (body part prefix)'	*ʃik
'plant species'	*ʃiko(n)
'spider species'	*ʃi(n)a
'to think'	*sina(n)-
'pium (fly species)'	*ʃio
'clarity'	*ʂaʔβak
'tamandua (kind of anteater)'	*ʂaʔɨ
'to cut'	*ʂaʔtɨ-
'to yawn'	*ʂaβa-
'tree bark, skin'	*ʂakaÇ
'sister-in-law, wife, cross-cousin (?)'	*ʂa(n)o
'bone'	*ʂao
'cotton'	*ʂapo
'pestle, stone'	*ʂaʂo
'calabash species'	*ʂata(n)
'macaw species'	*ʂawar
'tortoise'	*ʂawɨ
'sugar cane (?)'	*ʂawi
'to drink'	*ʂɨʔa-
'to thresh corn'	*ʂɨʔmɨ-
'palm species'	*ʂɨβo(n)
'gecko species'	*ʂɨkɨÇ
'caterpillar species'	*ʂɨ(n)a
'tree species'	*ʂɨ(n)a(n)
'fat, grease, oil'	*ʂɨ(n)i
'old'	*ʂɨ(n)i
'tooth, beak (of bird)'	*ʂɨta
'vulture'	*ʂɨtɨ
'to smell'	*ʂɨtɨ-
'smell, scent'	*wia
'stinky, stench'	*pisi
'ceiling, roof (made of straw), to thatch'	*ʂɨwa-
'benefactive'	*-ʂo(n)
'transitive concord suffix'	*-ʂon
'to roast'	*ʂoʔi-
'needle'	*ʂoʔomoʂ
'to scratch, to itch, itch'	*ʂoa-
'fat'	*ʂoaC-
'house'	*ʂoβo
'to peel'	*ʂoka-
'small'	*ʂoko
'to cast skin (?)'	*ʂokoC-
'breasts, milk'	*ʂoma
'green, unripe'	*ʂoo
'papaya'	*ʂopa(n)
'down feather'	*ʂopoÇ
'chest'	*ʂotsi
'girl, young girl'	*ʂõtako
'foot'	*taʔɨ
'temporary house, shelter (?)'	*taʔpas
'liver'	*takʷa
'peanut'	*tama
'cheek'	*tamβo
'to try, to taste (?)'	*tara-
'palm species'	*taoaÇ
'bridge, platform'	*tapo
'root'	*tapon
'old log, rotten log'	*taɽa
'to spin (?)'	*taɽá(n)-
'clothes'	*taɽi
'kind of basket'	*tasa
'salt'	*taʃi
'pile of logs floating down the river'	*taʂa
'bamboo used for making arrows'	*tawa
'to break'	*tɨʔk(ɨ)-
'blowpipe'	*tɨpi
'sprout, shoot'	*tɨʂka(n)
'neck, nape, throat'	*tɨʂo
'Adam's apple'	*tɨto(n)
'hawk species'	*tɨtɨC
'instrumental nominalizer'	*-ti
'to hit, to beat'	*tima-
'rifle, shotgun'	*to...
'strainer'	*toʔati
'to make pregnant, to give birth'	*to(ʔo)-
'frog or toad species'	*toa
'dark blue'	*to(n)a(n)
'wart'	*toʂpi
'to make'	*-wa
'farm, garden'	*wai
'water, river'	*waka
'fish species'	*wamɨ
'palm species'	*wani(m)
'pumpkin species'	*waɽa(m)
'to sweep, to forage'	*was
'herb'	*wasi
'spider's web'	*was(n)o(n)
'cotton'	*waʂmɨ(n)
'imperative verbal suffix'	*-wɨ
'narrow strait between two islands'	*wɨa
'other, another'	*wɨts(a)
'one (numeral)'	*wɨsti
'lower leg'	*wiʔtaʂɨ
'to row'	*wi(n)a-
'to cry, to weep'	*wi(n)-
'club, baton'	*wino
'to pass'	*wi(n)o-
'calf'	*wipoko
'black'	*wiso
'with, in possession of'	*-ya
'tick'	*yaʔra(n)
'town, settlement'	*yakat-
'negative suffix'	*(-ya)ma
'axe'	*yami
'fish'	*yapa
'late; afternoon'	*yãtan
'wild hog species'	*yawa
'armadillo species'	*yawis
'to say, to speak'	*yoʔi-
'animal'	*yoʔi(n)a
'to have fever, to get annoyed'	*yo(n)a-
'wizard'	*yoβɨ(ka)
'pepper species'	*yotʃi
'to ask'	*yoka-
'fish species'	*yoma
'thread, line, cord'	*yoma(n)
'to steal'	*yomɨtso-
'people, human body'	*yoɽa
'to grow'	*yo(o)si
'spirit'	*yosi(n)
'woman, old woman'	*yoʂa

== Bibliography ==
- Amarante Ribeiro, Lincoln Almir, and Gláucia Viera Cândido. (2008). "A formação de palavras a partir de morfemas monossilábicos nominais e bases verbais em línguas indígenas da família Pano: Prefixação ou incorporação nominal?" Veredas On Line (UFJF) 1:129–45.
- Campbell, Lyle. (1997). American Indian languages: The historical linguistics of Native America. New York: Oxford University Press. ISBN 0-19-509427-1.
- Eakin, Lucille. (1991). "Lecciones Para el Aprendizaje del Idioma Yaminahua. Documento de Trabajo no. 22. Yarinacocha, Peru: Instituto Lingüístico de Verano.
- Faust, Norma. (1973). "Lecciones Para el Aprendizaje del Idioma Shipibo-Conibo." Documento de Trabajo no. 1. Yarinacocha, Peru: Instituto Lingüístico de Verano.
- Ferreira, Rogério Vincente. (2007). "Afixos verbais em uma lingua da familia Pano." V Congreso Internacional de Investigaciones Lingüísticos-Filológicas: La Enseñanza de la Lengua en el Tercer Milenio. Lima: Universidad Ricardo Palma.
- Ferreira, Rogério Vincente. (2008). "Morfemas "partes do corpo" em Matis e algumas línguas da família Pano." Raído (Universidade Federal da Grande Dourados) 2, no. 4:35–39.
- Fleck, David. (2006). "Body-part prefixes in Matses: Derivation or noun incorporation?" IJAL 72:59–96.
- Hyde, Sylvia. (1980). "Diccionario Amahuaca" (Edición Preliminar). Serie Lingüística Peruana no. 7. Yarinacocha, Peru: Instituto Lingüístico Peruano.
- Kaufman, Terrence. (1990). "Language history in South America: What we know and how to know more." In D. L. Payne (Ed.), Amazonian linguistics: Studies in lowland South American languages (pp. 13–67). Austin: University of Texas Press. ISBN 0-292-70414-3.
- Kaufman, Terrence. (1994). "The native languages of South America." In C. Mosley & R. E. Asher (Eds.), Atlas of the world's languages (pp. 46–76). London: Routledge.
- Loos, E.; Loos, B. (2003). Diccionario Capanahua-Castellano. Versión electrónica ilustrada. (Serie Lingüística Peruana, 45). Lima: Summer Institute of Linguistics.
- Loos, Eugene E. (1999). "Pano." The Amazonian Languages, ed. R. M. W. Dixon and Alexandra Y. Aikhenvald, pp. 227–49. Cambridge: Cambridge University Press.
- Loriot, James; Erwin Lauriault; and Dwight Day. (1993). "Diccionario Shipibo–Castellano." Serie Lingüística Peruana no. 31. Yarinacocha, Peru: Instituto Lingüístico de Verano.
- Migliazza, Ernest C.; & Campbell, Lyle. (1988). "Panorama general de las lenguas indígenas en América". Historia general de América (Vol. 10). Caracas: Instituto Panamericano de Geografía e Historia.
- Prost, Gilbert R. (1967). "Chacobo." Bolivian Indian Grammars: 1, ed. Esther Matteson, pp. 285–359. Norman: Summer Institute of Linguistics and the University of Oklahoma.
- Rodrigues, Aryon. (1986). Linguas brasileiras: Para o conhecimento das linguas indígenas. São Paulo: Edições Loyola.
- Scott, M. (2004). Vocabulario Sharanahua-Castellano. (Serie Lingüística Peruana, 53). Lima: Summer Institute of Linguistics.
- Shell, Olive A. (1975). "Las lenguas pano y su reconstrucción". Serie Lingüística Peruana (No. 12). Yarinacocha, Peru: Instituto Lingüístico de Verano.
- Valenzuela, Pilar M. (2003). "Transitivity in Shipibo-Konibo grammar." Ph.D. dissertation, University of Oregon, Eugene.
- Zariquiey Biondi, Roberto and David W. Fleck. (2012). "Body-Part Prefixation in Kashibo-Kakataibo: Synchronic or Diachronic Derivation?" IJAL 78(3):385–409.
- Zingg, Philipp. (1998). Diccionario Chácobo–Castellano Castellano–Chácobo con Bosquejo de la Gramática Chacobo y con Apuntes Culturales. La Paz, Bolivia: Ministerio de Desarrollo Sostenible y Planificación Viceministro de Asuntos Indígenas y Pueblos Originarios.
