= Kulina language (Panoan) =

Endangered Panoan language of Brazil

Kulina
- Kulina Pano
- Native to: Brazil
- Region: Curuça River
- Ethnicity: Kulina Pano
- Native speakers: 32 (2007)
- Language family: Panoan: Mayoruna; Mayo; Matses; Kulina

Language codes
- ISO 639-3: xpk
- Glottolog: kuli1255
- ELP: Kulina

Kulina or Kulina Pano is an obsolescent Panoan language of Javari River valley, Brazil. The Kulina Pano people live in the village of Aldeia Pedro Lopes on the middle stretch of the Curuçá River in Amazonas. There are very few native speakers of Kulina Pano language remaining, and it is no longer in daily use. All Kulina Pano speak Portuguese.

Dialects are Kapishtana, Mawi, and Chema.
