= Pano-Tacanan languages =

Proposed family of languages

Pano-Tacanan
- (generally accepted)
- Geographic distribution: southern Amazon
- Linguistic classification: Macro-Panoan ?: Pano-Tacanan
- Subdivisions: Panoan; Tacanan

Language codes
- Glottolog: pano1259
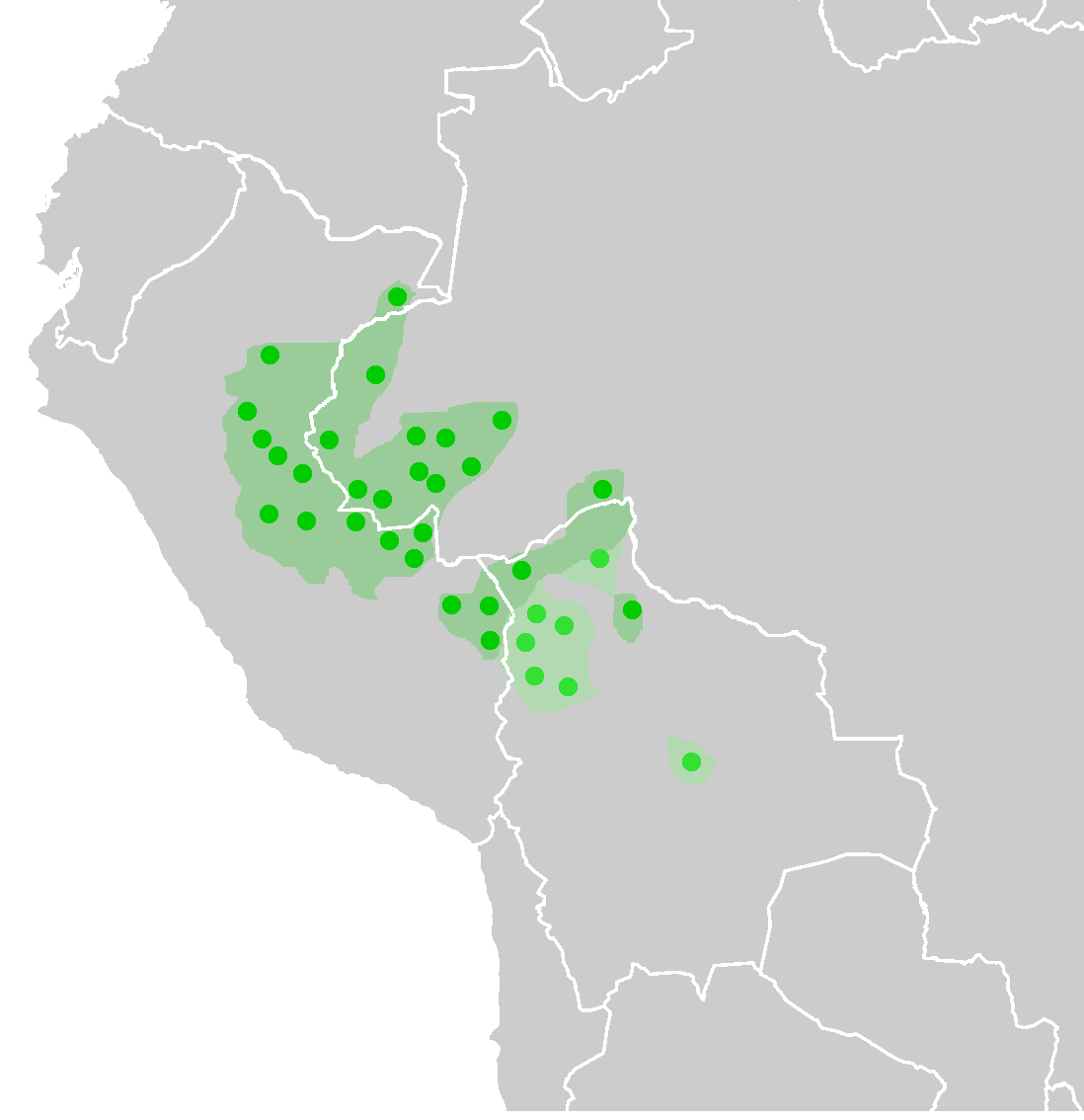
- Panoan languages (dark green) and Tacanan languages (light green). Circles indicate locations of modern languages.

Pano-Tacanan (also Pano-Takana, Pano-Takánan, Pano-Tacana, Páno-Takána) is a proposed and generally accepted family of languages spoken in Peru, western Brazil, Bolivia and northern Paraguay. There are two close-knit branches, Panoan and Tacanan (Adelaar & Muysken 2004; Kaufman 1990, 1994), with 33 languages. There are lexical and grammatical similarities between the two branches, but it has not yet been demonstrated that these are genetic (Loos 1999).

Most Panoan languages are spoken in either Peru or western Brazil; a few are in Bolivia. All Tacanan languages are spoken in Bolivia (Ese’ejja is also spoken in Peru).

== Genealogical relations ==
Migliazza has presented lexical evidence in support of a genetic relationship between the Panoan and Yanomaman languages. He also suggests that a Panoan–Chibchan relationship is plausible.

Jolkesky (2016) also notes that there are lexical similarities with the Arawakan languages due to contact.

== Comparison ==
Below is a list of lexical cognates shared between Proto-Pano and Proto-Takana, demonstrating the genetic relatedness of the Pano and Takana branches. The two branches also share many basic cognate grammatical morphemes.

| gloss | proto-Pano | proto-Takana | proto-Pano-Takana |
|---|---|---|---|
| tree | *hiwi | *akwi | **hegwi |
| tooth | *ʂɨ- | *t͡ʂe- | **ʂɨ- |
| two | *ɾa-ßɨta | *beta | **bɨta |
| liver | *takwa | *takwa | **takwa |
| leaf | *pɨʔi | *pei ‘to fan’ | **pɨʔi |
| bone | *ʂao | *t͡ʂau | **ʂau |
| tongue | *hana | *ana | **hana |
| hand | *mɨ- | *me- | **mɨ- |
| night | *(ya)mɨtV | *meta | **mɨta |
| skin | *ßitsi | *biti | **bitsi |
| fire | *tsiʔi | *ti | **tsiʔi |
| knee | *ɾã- | *da | **da-n |
| blood | *himi | *ami | **hemi |
| breast | *ʂo- | *aṭṣu | **aṣu |
| sun | *ßari | *badi ‘moon’ | **badi |
| I | *ʔɨ | *e | **ʔɨ |
| you (sg.) | *mi | *mi | **mi |
| come | *ßɨ- ‘come, bring’ | *be- ‘bring’ | **bɨ- |
| flesh | *nami | *ɾami | **Nami |
| fat (n.) | *ʂɨni | *ṭṣeri | **ṣɨNi |
| fingernail | *mɨ̃-tsis[i] | *metiji | **mɨ-tsizi |
| foot, leg | *ta- ‘foot’ | *ta- ‘leg’ | **ta- |
| lip, edge | *kwɨ- | *kwe(i)- | **kwɨ ~ **kɨ- |
| cheek | *tamo | *tamu | **tamu |
| mouth | *kwɨʂa[CV] | *kwat͡ʂa | **kweʂa |
| elbow | *βaȿ(u)- | *–batʂu | **baṣu |
| howler monkey | *ɾoʔo | *duʔu | **duʔu |
| mother | *ɨwa | *e-kwa | **ɨ-kwa |
| big | *ani | *aɾi | **aNi |
| flute | *ɾɨwɨ | *dewe | **dɨwɨ |
| hole | *kini | *kani | **keni |

== Bibliography ==
- Adelaar, Willem F. H.; & Muysken, Pieter C. (2004). The languages of the Andes. Cambridge language surveys. Cambridge University Press.
- Campbell, Lyle. (1997). American Indian languages: The historical linguistics of Native America. New York: Oxford University Press. ISBN 0-19-509427-1.
- Kaufman, Terrence. (1990). Language history in South America: What we know and how to know more. In D. L. Payne (Ed.), Amazonian linguistics: Studies in lowland South American languages (pp. 13–67). Austin: University of Texas Press. ISBN 0-292-70414-3.
- Kaufman, Terrence. (1994). "The native languages of South America." In C. Mosley & R. E. Asher (Eds.), Atlas of the world's languages (pp. 46–76). London: Routledge.
- Suárez, Jorge A. (1973). Macro-Pano-Tacanan. In International Journal of American Linguistics, Vol. 39, No. 3, pp. 137–154. The University of Chicago Press. Accessed from DiACL.
