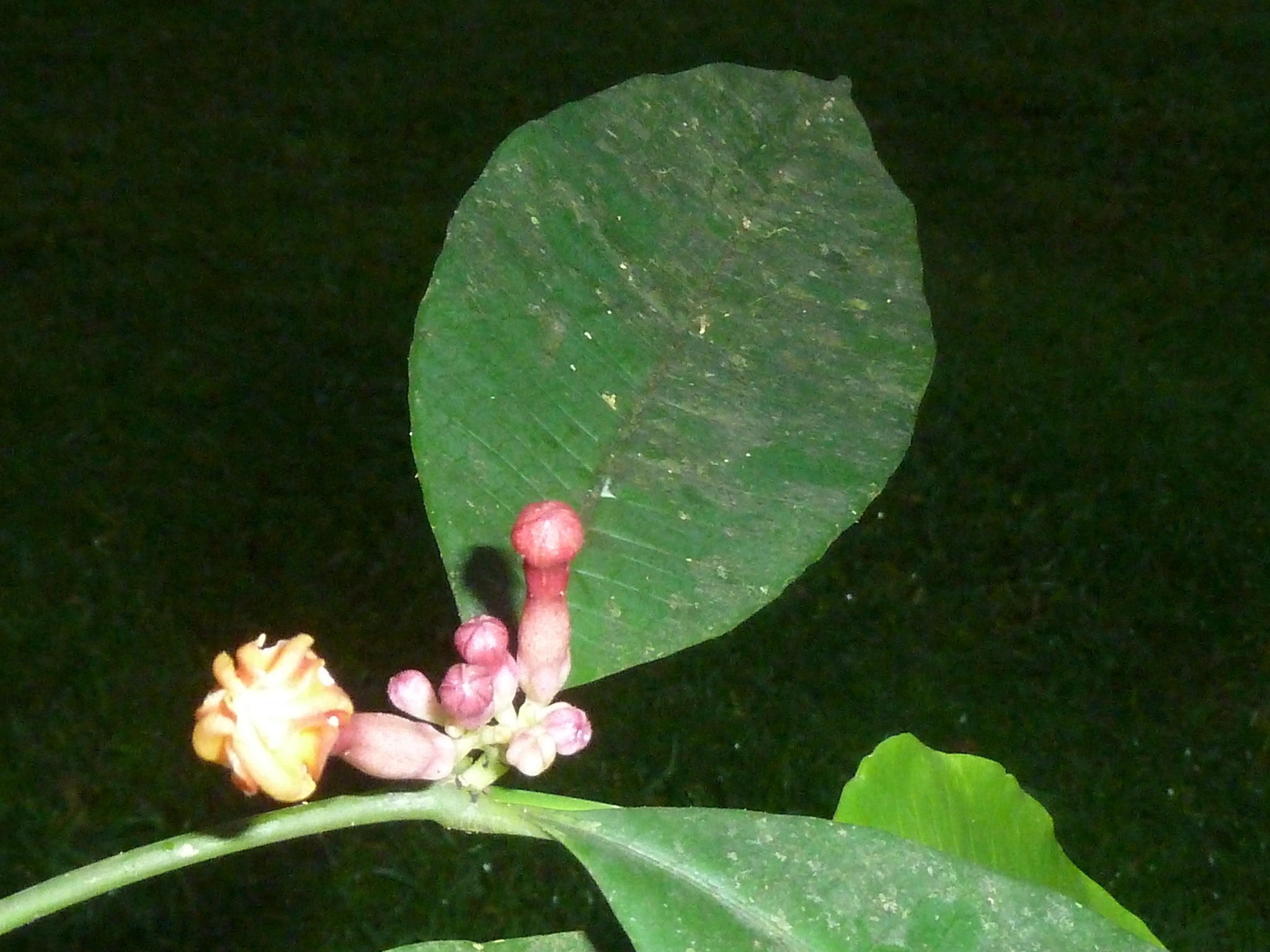

Scientific classification
- Kingdom: Plantae
- Clade: Tracheophytes
- Clade: Angiosperms
- Clade: Eudicots
- Clade: Asterids
- Order: Gentianales
- Family: Apocynaceae
- Genus: Tabernaemontana
- Species: T. undulata

Binomial name
- Tabernaemontana undulata Vahl

Synonyms
- Bonafousia undulata (Vahl) A.DC.

= Tabernaemontana undulata =

Species of plant

Tabernaemontana undulata, the becchete or bëcchëte (pronounced b'-chéw-teh, a Matis and Matsés word for a medicinal plant) is a plant species in the family Apocynaceae. It occurs in the Amazon rainforest.

== Effects ==
Preparation of the medicine begins with a shaman scraping off the outer layers of root bark of the Samá becchete into a leaf. The shaman recites calls to specific animal spirits, such as the squirrel monkey, hummingbird and deer. The shavings are placed inside kapok cotton, combined with water, and wrapped into a leaf that functions as an eye-dropper. When applied directly to the eye, becchete is reported by tribes to have the effect of giving the environment greater texture and dimension, making it easier to spot animals during hunting. The effects are reported to be long-term, lasting days or weeks, not just a few hours. In addition to visual enhancement, there is also an increase in energy. On application, the eyes sting, however this would be expected considering that becchete is extracted with Amazonian River water that is high in tannic acid, which on its own would sting and burn the eyes. In the Amazonian Ethnobotanical Dictionary by James A. Duke and Rodolfo Vásquez, it is reported that Amazonian Indians from the Ticuna tribe mix the latex from a closely related species, Tabernaemontana sananho, with water in order to treat eye wounds. In addition to be applied to the eyes as the Matis and Ticuna tribes do, it is most commonly taken orally by the Matsés.

== Active ingredients ==
Tabernaemontana undulata contains iboga alkaloids, naturally occurring psychoactive compounds. Ibogaine is used in pain management and to treat opiate addiction. In low dosages, ibogaine is a stimulant and aphrodisiac.

== History ==
Scott Wallace of National Geographic was the first person to report the use of this indigenous Amazonian medicine by the Matis tribe. Dan James Pantone, one of the founders of the Movement in the Amazon for Tribal Subsistence and Economic Sustainability (MATSES), discovered that the Matsés tribe also uses becchete. In September 2008, Pantone collected plant samples from the Amazon rainforest in the Matsés Indian Territory in the region of the Yaquerana River on the border of Peru with Brazil. Working together with other botanists at the Universidad Nacional de la Amazonía Peruana (UNAP) in Iquitos, Peru, he was able to identify the plant species as Tabernaemontana undulata, part of the genus Tabernaemontana and the plant family Apocynaceae. Pantone has produced a documentary video showing the Matis using Becchete as a traditional medicine.

== See also ==
- Tabernaemontana palustris
