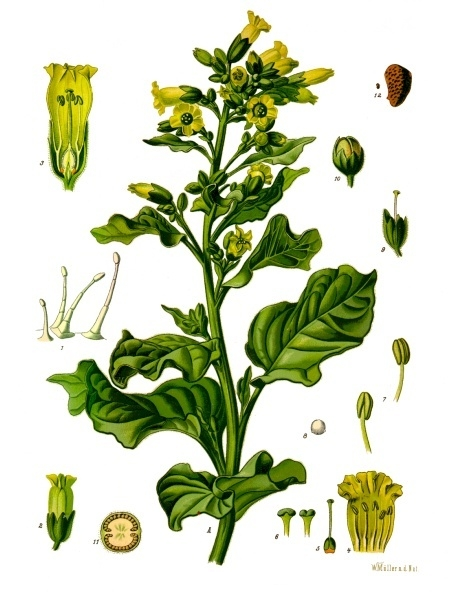

Scientific classification
- Kingdom: Plantae
- Clade: Embryophytes
- Clade: Tracheophytes
- Clade: Angiosperms
- Clade: Eudicots
- Clade: Asterids
- Order: Solanales
- Family: Solanaceae
- Genus: Nicotiana
- Species: N. rustica

Binomial name
- Nicotiana rustica L.

= Nicotiana rustica =

Species of plant

Nicotiana rustica, commonly known as Aztec tobacco or strong tobacco, is a rainforest plant in the family Solanaceae native to South America. It is a very potent variety of tobacco, containing up to nine times more nicotine than common species of Nicotiana such as Nicotiana tabacum (common tobacco). More specifically, N. rustica leaves have a nicotine content as high as 9%, whereas N. tabacum leaves contain about 1 to 3%. The high concentration of nicotine in its leaves makes it useful for producing pesticides, and it has a wide variety of uses specific to cultures around the world. However, N. rustica is no longer cultivated in North America (except in small quantities by certain Native American tribes) as N. tabacum has replaced it.

== Uses ==
=== South America ===
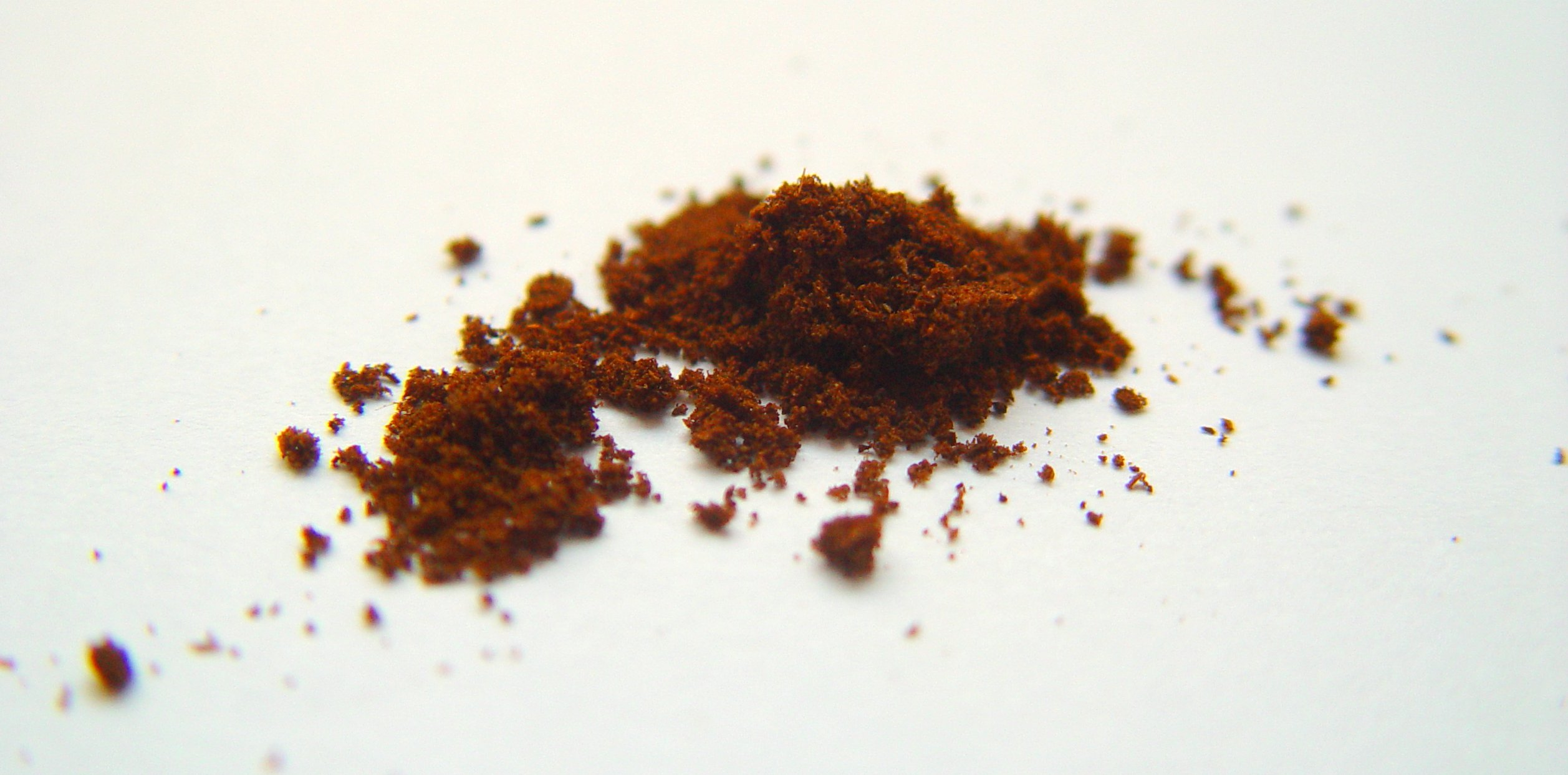
Rapé, a type of snuff tobacco

Nicotiana rustica is called mapacho in South America. It is often used for entheogenic purposes by South American shamans, because of the comparatively high levels of harmala alkaloids and nicotine. There are many methods of administration in South American ethnobotanical preparations. In a preparation known as singado or singa, N. rustica is allowed to soak or be infused in water, and the water is then insufflated. In Peru it is known as "Mapacho" and is smoked in pipes or drunk as a juice. The plant can also be smoked in cigars, administered as an enema, and made into a lickable product known as ambil. Finally, N. rustica is a common ingredient in rapé, a fine powder which is blown into the nostrils during ceremonies. Rapé is often a combination of N. rustica and a host of other herbs, depending on the intended use, including tonka beans, cinnamon, clove buds, soda ash (creating nu-nu), Anadenanthera, Erythroxylum, Virola, and more. In Amazonian traditions, rapé is a finely powdered nasal snuff typically prepared from the leaves of Nicotiana rustica mixed with ashes derived from the bark of particular tree species. The dried ingredients are pounded and filtered to produce a very fine dust. Varieties of N. rustica used include “corda”, “moi”, and in some contexts fermented mapacho. Due to its high nicotine content—often several times greater than Nicotiana tabacum—rapé is considered potent and is used ritually for its grounding and focusing effects. The choice of tree ashes and additional plant ingredients varies among different groups and is often specific to individual tribes.

=== Russia ===
In Russia, N. rustica is called makhorka (маxорка). Historically, makhorka was smoked mainly by the lower classes. N. rustica is a hardy plant and can be grown in most of Russia (as opposed to other Nicotiana species which require a warm climate), it was more readily and cheaply available, and did not depend on transport in a country with an underdeveloped road network and climatic portage problems. This remained the case until cultivated tobacco became widely available in the 20th century.

During Soviet times, rustic tobacco was an important industrial crop of agriculture. In those times, dozens of varieties were bred, some of them considered equal in quality to cultivated tobacco. In modern times, makhorka is still sometimes smoked by peasants and farmers due to its high availability and being almost free for them.

=== Vietnam ===
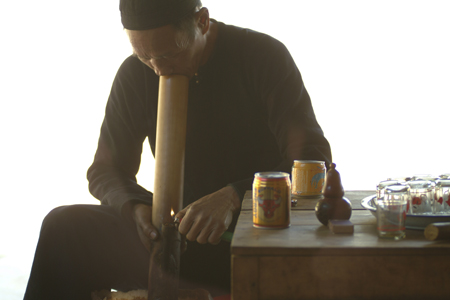
A man smoking thuốc lào with a bamboo pipe

The plant is called Thuốc lào in Vietnam, and is most commonly smoked after a meal on a full stomach to "aid in digestion", or along with green tea or local beer (most commonly the cheap bia hơi). A "rít" of thuốc lào is followed by a flood of nicotine to the bloodstream inducing strong dizziness that lasts several seconds. Heavy cigarette smokers have had trouble with the intense volume of smoke and the high nicotine content; side effects include nausea and vomiting.

There are many "brands" of tobacco, most of which are specific to the region in which they are grown. Some of these "brands" are mellow in flavor and effect, some are more energizing, and some are known for their relaxing properties.

Water pipes can be found everywhere, and are a fixture of local tea booths, eateries, and cafes. It is common to find a table with a small box of tobacco at these establishments from which anyone can help themselves to a bowl during a tea or work break.

The main difference between smoking thuốc lào and the use of other tobaccos is in the method of consumption, in that thuốc lào is consumed with a water pipe. The smoker is presented with either a bamboo pipe called a điếu cày (English: "farmer's pipe") or a ceramic hookah called a điếu bát. It may also occasionally be smoked in a more uncommon pipe known as a điếu ống. The pipe is filled with an appropriate amount of water and a small amount of thuốc lào is pressed into the bowl.

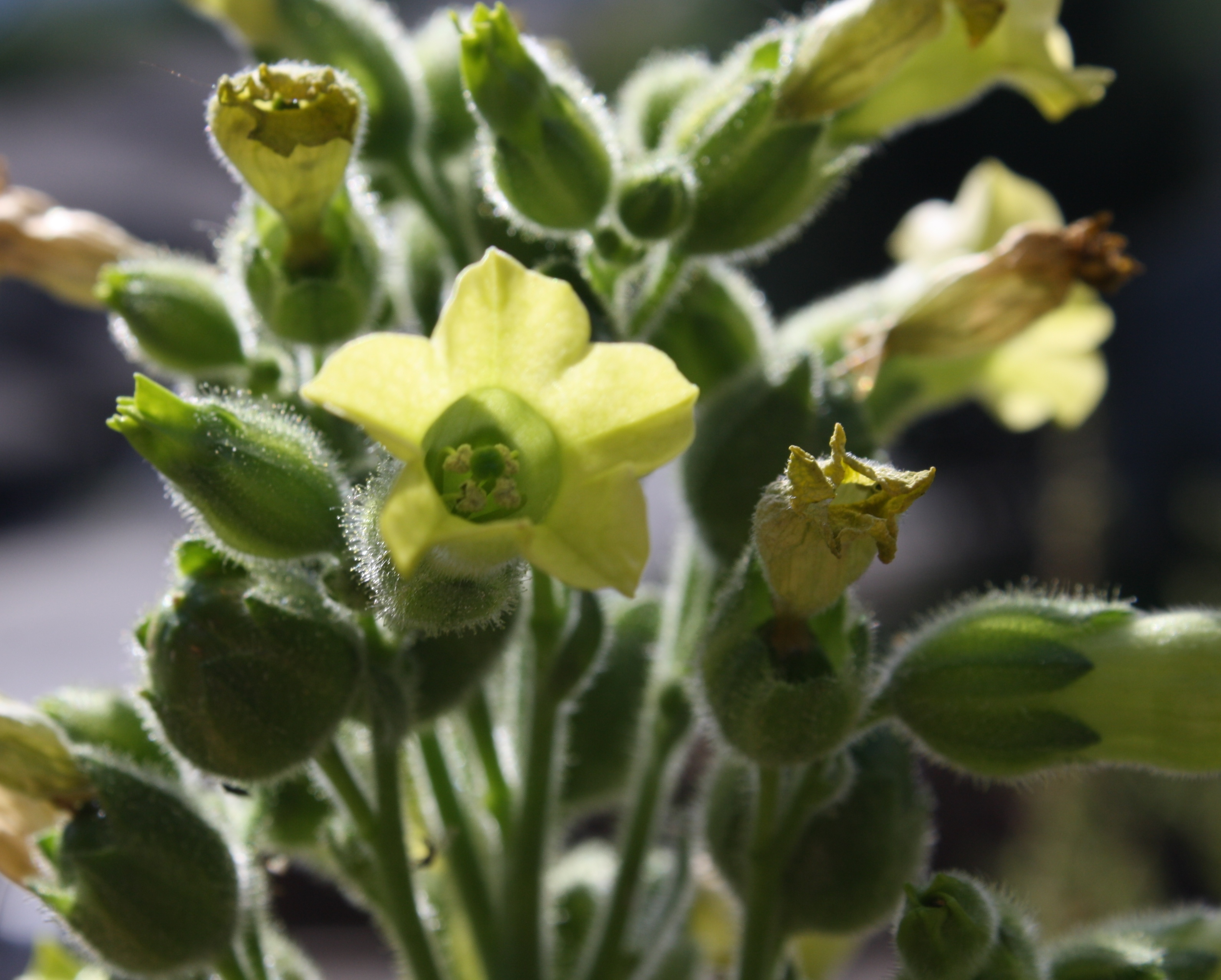
Flowering Nicotiana rustica

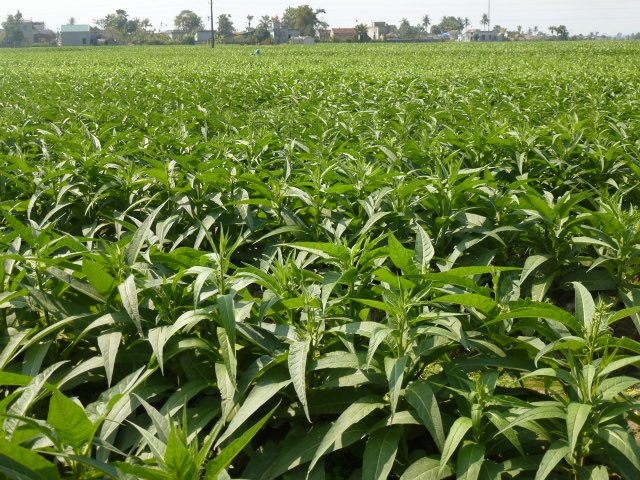
Nicotiana rustica field in Quảng Xương district, Thanh Hóa province, Vietnam

One then ignites the tobacco and inhales to create a body of smoke inside the pipe, before exhaling the smoke, reversing the process of air in the pipe by blowing into it to pop out the tobacco. The smoker then sharply inhales, usually tilting the pipe upwards to an almost horizontal position (but not completely, as the water would drain into the mouth).

=== Turkey ===
Maraş otu (English: Maraş weed) is a chewing variant of Nicotiana rustica commonly used by people who live in Maraş, Turkey and other areas of the country. Maraş Otu is a mixture of Oak tree ash and Nicotiana rustica that resembles henna. They use this by putting the mixture under their lips like Swedish snus or Afghan naswar. It is recognized as a drug by anti-drug activists. It can contribute to mouth cancers.

=== Sudan ===
In Sudan, this type of tobacco is called toombak (Arabic: توومباك). It has been used for over 400 years. Toombak being a form of smokeless tobacco, the tobacco leaves are cured, dried, ground and then mixed with sodium bicarbonate. As such, the freebase nicotine in this product is highly addictive.

== Ecology ==
Nicotiana rustica serves as a larval host plant for Chrysodeixis includens and Phthorimaea operculella. Known pollinators of Nicotiana rustica include: Augochlorella aurata, Lasioglossum perpunctatum, Bombus impatiens, Lasioglossum tegulare, Augochlora pura, Lasioglossum michiganense, Lasioglossum versans, Bombus vagans, Halictus ligatus, Lasioglossum oblongum, Halictus rubicundus, Megachile frigida, and Sphecodes heraclei.

== See also ==
- Teotlaqualli
