= Matsés massacre =

Bombing of Matsés people in Peru

- Location: Javary River area, Department of Loreto, Peru
- Date: 1964
- Victim: Unknown
- Perpetrator: Peruvian Air Force

The Matsés massacre was a set of military bombings carried out by the state of Peru against Matsés (also known as 'Mayoruna') communities in the northeast of the country in 1964, during the first presidency of Fernando Belaúnde. The number of deaths and injuries is unknown.

The northeastern jungle was already of interest to the Peruvian government. Belaúnde had published La conquista del Perú por los peruanos in 1959, in which he said that the natural resources of the Peruvian Amazonia must be exploited, especially wood, and that a highway must be built to connect the cities of the Amazon to the rest of the country. The massacre was part of the clash between the mixed-race, "civilized" western world and the Amazonian indigenous world.

The Belaúnde administration justified the attack by claiming that the Matsés were forming communist militias.

== Historical context ==
=== Relationship between Peru and Loreto ===
The Department of Loreto had made attempts at independence in the past; the indigenous population of the department was favorable to almost all of these attempts, leading to tense relations between the government of Peru and the residents of the department.

=== Violence against the indigenous population ===
Loreto was disconnected from the rest of the country, but during the Amazon rubber boom of the late 19th and early 20th centuries, many fortune-seekers were drawn to the area. One of them, Julio César Arana, was the main perpetrator of the Putumayo genocide between 1879 and 1912, in which the people of the Putumayo and Caquetá river basins were enslaved and forced to extract rubber.

While the Matsés inhabited the Javary River basin, far from the area of conflict, they still experienced subjugation by Brazilian and Peruvian rubber barons, provoking hostilities between the Matsés and non-indigenous intruders into their territories. The Belaúnde government posted a sign, in Spanish (which the Matsés could not read) warning that they could continue their behavior and be killed by bombs and poison, or be welcomed into civilization. The Matsés had developed many survival techniques to avoid being detected by settlers, such as teaching their dogs not to bark when ordered, cultivating small farms in different hidden parts of the forest, and establishing shorter periods of itinerant agriculture.

== Development ==
In October 1964 in Requena province, in the east of Loreto, Peruvian lumberjacks and colonists were ambushed by a group of Matsés. In response, Belaúnde sent the Peruvian Air Force to bomb the villages of three of the four most important Matsés clans (the fourth clan lived across the border in Brazil). The action was received positively by the Peruvian public. According to Stefano Varese, the Air Force used a napalm bomb in their attack, as a practice run for later use against the National Liberation Army of Peru and the Revolutionary Left Movement of Peru.

Residents of the area disputed the alleged relationship between the Matsés and the guerrillas:

Los cuentos que leí en los periódicos eran pura mentira: que había ametralladoras con los Matsés, que ellos lanzaron insultos en español (quizás algunos supiesen algunas palabras), que estaban dirigidos por la guerrilla… A Lima habían llegado historias que había guerrilla en la zona y que estaba atacando a la gente de Requena y bla, bla, bla. Pero era pura mentira. No había guerrilla allí. Después llegaron helicópteros de mi país [Perú] para ayudar a evacuar a los heridos. Yo he visto las fotos de los helicópteros militares que llegaron desde las bases de los Estados Unidos en Panamá para evacuar a los heridos. Luego vinieron los bombarderos de la aviación peruana, creo que llegaron de la base de Chiclayo, y echaron sus bombas. Felizmente no mataron a los Matsés, pero los asustaron. Ellos tuvieron que abandonar sus malocas. Se fueron corriendo y fue una cosa horrible, pero no fue una matanza. Gracias a Dios.

[The stories I read in the newspapers were pure lies: that there were machine guns with the Matsés, that they hurled insults in Spanish (maybe some of them knew a few words), that they were led by the guerrillas... Stories had reached Lima that there were guerrillas in the area and that they were attacking the people of Requena and blah, blah, blah. But it was pure lies. There were no guerrillas there. Then helicopters arrived from my country [Peru] to help evacuate the wounded. I have seen the photos of the military helicopters that arrived from the U.S. bases in Panama to evacuate the wounded. Then the Peruvian aviation bombers came, I think they arrived from the base in Chiclayo, and dropped their bombs. Fortunately they did not kill the Matsés, but they scared them. They had to abandon their malocas. They ran away and it was a horrible thing, but it was not a massacre. Thank God.]

At the end of the military campaign, Belaúnde congratulated the lumberjacks in the Government Palace and traveled to the city of Requena to inaugurate a new airport. The use of napalm was confirmed on October 9, 1968, after the Revolutionary Government of the Armed Forces of Peru performed a successful coup against the Belaúnde government earlier that year.

== Legacy ==
After the fall of the Revolutionary Government, the state did not consider the 1964 attack on the Matsés to be important. Recently, the Belaúnde government has been criticized for its hostile stance toward the Matsés, who were acting to defend themselves, and its softer stance the second Belaúnde administration had toward the Shining Path, a terrorist group that (among other violent actions) massacred the Asháninka people of the Amazon.
