= Eschatogonia minuta =

Scientific classification
- Kingdom: Fungi
- Division: Ascomycota
- Class: Lecanoromycetes
- Order: Lecanorales
- Family: Ramalinaceae
- Genus: Eschatogonia
- Species: E. minuta

Binomial name
- Eschatogonia minuta Timdal & R.Sant. (2008)
- Holotype: Jenaro Herrera, Peru

Species of lichen

Eschatogonia minuta is a species of corticolous (bark-dwelling) squamulose lichen in the family Ramalinaceae. The species was formally described in 2008 by the lichenologists Einar Timdal and Rolf Santesson, based on material collected from lowland Amazonian rainforest in Loreto, Peru. It is distinguished by its extremely fine, coral-like lobes that are only 0.04–0.06 mm wide, needle-shaped ascospores 16–25 micrometres long, and the complete absence of detectable secondary metabolites. The lichen is found in primary rainforests of Brazil, Peru, El Salvador, Venezuela, French Guiana, and Trinidad, where it grows on the shaded bark of tree trunks in humid, undisturbed forest environments.

== Taxonomy ==
Eschatogonia minuta is a narrowly lobed, scale-forming lichen that was formally described in 2008 by the lichenologists Einar Timdal and Rolf Santesson, based on material collected in lowland Amazonian rainforest in Loreto, Peru. It is readily separated from the widespread E. prolifera and from other Peruvian members of Eschatogonia by a unique character trio: extremely fine, partly cylindrical lobes only 0.04–0.06 mm wide, acicular (needle-shaped) ascospores 16–25 μm long, and a complete absence of detectable secondary metabolites on thin-layer chromatography.

Timdal's comparative key further shows that E. minuta differs from E. dissecta by having shorter spores and a chemistry devoid of homosekikaic or hyperhomosekikaic acids, while it is set apart from E. angustiloba by the coralloid habit of the lobes and their markedly smaller width. Field collections demonstrate that these traits remain stable even when E. minuta grows intermixed with related species on the same trunk, corroborating its rank as a distinct species within the Ramalinaceae.

== Description ==
The thallus forms loosely effuse patches of minute squamules 0.3–0.6 mm across. Each squamule quickly splits into a tuft of branch-like lobes that are mostly flat near their base but soon become half-round (terete) and ascend, giving the entire lichen a coral-like appearance. The upper surface is dull green, free of any frost-like coating (pruina) and unmarked by spots; the squamule margins are the same colour as the upper surface. Unlike several other Eschatogonia lichens, E. minuta produces no marginal lobules and its inner tissue (medulla) lacks the needle-shaped crystals that dissolve in potassium hydroxide solution, a standard spot test in lichenology.

Fruiting bodies (apothecia) are uncommon. When present they appear as solitary or weakly clustered discs up to 0.6 mm in diameter that start pale brown and become slightly domed with age; their rim is poorly developed and may become notched (emarginate). The spores are simple or faintly one-septate, slender cylinders about 1.5 μm thick and 16–25 μm long (measured in water from forty spores). No asexual propagules (pycnidia) have been observed, and repeated chromatographic surveys confirm that the thallus is chemically negative for all standard lichen products.

== Habitat and distribution ==
Eschatogonia minuta inhabits humid, shaded trunks in primary lowland to lower-montane rainforest. It has been recorded from four departments in the Peruvian Amazonia between roughly 100 and 1200 m elevation, with additional collections from El Salvador, Venezuela, and French Guiana. It was reported from the West Indies (Trinidad), and from Brazil in 2023. All Peruvian sites lie in undisturbed forest, where the lichen grows on the lower bark of standing trees, often among mosses and other corticolous lichens.

Although the species' overall range is probably broader than the present herbarium record, its reliance on shaded, consistently moist microhabitats suggests some sensitivity to canopy opening and bark desiccation. Within suitable rainforest, however, E. minuta can be locally frequent and sometimes co-occurs with E. angustiloba and E. prolifera, indicating that fine-scale niche partitioning—rather than broad ecological separation—may allow several Eschatogonia species to share the same substrate.
