= Tamshiyacu Tahuayo Regional Conservation Area =

- Área de Conservación Regional Comunal Tamshiyacu Tahuayo
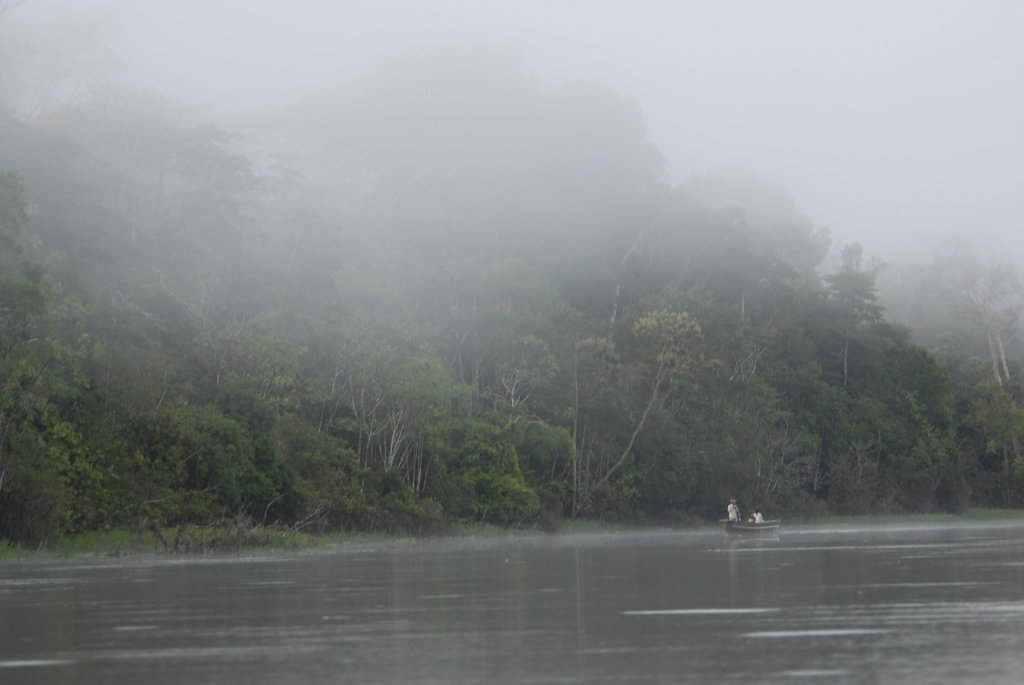
- Dawn on the Tamshiyacu Tahuayo Regional Conservation Area.

- Location within Peru
- Interactive map of Tamshiyacu Tahuayo Regional Conservation Area
- Location: Maynas, Requena, and Ramón Castilla provinces, Loreto, Peru
- Nearest city: Iquitos; Nauta
- Coordinates: 4°17′37″S 73°14′10″W
- Area: 420,080.25 hectares (1,621.9389 sq mi)
- Established: May 15, 2009 (by Decreto Supremo 010-2009-MINAM)
- Governing body: Regional Government of Loreto
- Website: www.regionloreto.gob.pe

Tamshiyacu Tahuayo Regional Conservation Area (ACRCTT; Spanish: Área de Conservación Regional Comunal Tamshiyacu Tahuayo) is a protected area located south east of Iquitos, extending over the Peruvian department of Loreto, provinces of Maynas (district of Fernando Lores), Ramón Castilla (district of Yavarí) and Requena (district of Sapuena and district of Yaquerana).

It was established by the Peruvian Ministry of Environment (MINAM; Spanish: Ministerio del Ambiente) on May 15, 2009. The reserve is managed and funded by the Regional Government of Loreto.

Tamshiyacu Tahuayo Regional Conservation Area spans an area of 4,200.8 km^{2} (420,080.25 ha; 1'038,040.9 acre; 1,621.94 sq miles) comprising floodable and upland forest of the Peruvian Amazon. It is known for its abundant wildlife.

It has high levels of biodiversity. Hundreds of species of mammals, primates, birds, fish and reptiles have been documented, including several that are endemic as well as either endangered or threatened.

The reserve was established to conserve ecosystems of upland and floodable rainforests, as well as ecological and evolutionary processes of the area, guaranteeing the sustainable use of the wildlife by the local population.

Tamshiyacu Tahuayo has several research and tourist activities focused on wildlife-spotting, including camping, hiking, boating, bird watching and fishing.

== History ==
Much research had been conducted in this area since the mid-1970s. Between 1980 and 1990 the importance of conserving the area was highlighted due its unique and vast biodiversity, especially the high diversity of primates as the threatened red bald uakari (Cacajao calvus ucayalii), endemic to Peru, as well as other species recently recorded, such as the red uakari poison frog (Ranitomeya uakarii).

During the 1980s, the Peruvian government noted the unusual number of primates produced by this region and so in the early 1980s biologist Pekka Soini (who later became renowned for his conservation work with Amazon turtles in the Pacaya Samiria) and his assistant Rogelio Castro, conducted the first primate population survey under the auspices of IVITA (the Peruvian Instituto Veterinario de Investigaciones Tropicales y de Altura).

In 1984, University of Illinois primatologist Paul Garber and his student Richard Bodmer came from the United States to further study the mammalian ecology. Evidence of the regions ecological importance continued to grow. Additionally, local villages of the Tahuayo River and the Blanco River had long grown tired of the exploitation and degradation of natural resources in the area which had started in the 1970s.

In the late 1980s, conservationist Greg Neise and Richard Bodmer worked with the communities of the Tahuayo River to develop a plan to have the region recognized as a community reserve.

A few years later the passage of Propuesta Tecnica by the province of Maynas became a reality.

On June 19, 1991 with the enactment of Executive Resolution #080-91-CR-GRA-P. The reserve was declared a community reserve and named Reserva Comunal Tamshiyacu-Tahuayo (RCTT) after two of its major boundary rivers. Initial conservation efforts in the RCTT were funded by the Rainforest Conservation Fund (RCF), based in Chicago and headed by Neise.

Unfortunately, during the first ten years of its creation, the legal protection of the RCTT failed as commercial loggers and fisheries exploited many resources. The situation was made worse due to the anti-conservationist sentiments heading the regional government of Loreto. The governor at the time, Robinson, was opposed to expanding or even honoring any existing conservation measures. The reserve was on the brink of collapse.

However, in 2006 the election of pro-conservation candidate Yvan Vasquez as regional president of Loreto renewed support for Tahuayo conservation. Soon after Vasquez election the reserve was expanded in size to over a million acres (over 440,000 hectares) and given added legal protection.

On May 21, 2007, the Regional Government of Loreto signed the Ordenanza Regional 011-2007-GRL-CR that approved the technical proposal for the establishment of the protected area. The proposal was signed at a ceremony held at Amazonia Expeditions Amazon Research Center.

A few years later on May 15, 2009 the proposal was ratified by the national government of Peru in Lima, the Ministry of Environment signed the Decreto Supremo 010-2009-MINAM, law that officially created the Area de Conservation Regional Communal Tamshiyacu Tahuayo (ACRCTT).

== Geography ==
ACRCTT is located within the Department of Loreto, in the north of Peru. It is 420,080.25 ha (4,200.8 km^{2}; 1’038,040.9 acres) in area.

The reserve comprises rivers, lakes, canals, oxbow lakes, swamps, several types of upland and lowland forests including varzea, igapo, and terra firme.

== Biology and ecology ==
The conservation area includes part of the Iquitos várzea ecoregion. ACRCTT has many world records on diversity of plants, primates and mammals species.

=== Flora ===
ACRCTT has habitat that supports a known 1650 species of plants, however it is estimated that there are 2500-3500 species of plants in ACRCTT. It is possible to find trees such cedar (Cedrela odorata), mahogany (Swietenia macrophylla), and others.

=== Fauna ===
In 2003 the Chicago Field Museum’s Rapid Biological Inventory, found in the ACRCTT 240 species of fish, 77 species of amphibians, 45 species of reptiles, 400 species of birds, and 39 species of terrestrial mammals, including 14 species of primates. Subsequent research has increased the totals to over 110 species of terrestrial mammals (Michael Valqui, doctoral thesis, University of Florida), over 600 species of birds (Dr. Carol Foss, Noam Shaney, Alfredo Begazo, Josias Tello, Andy Bicerra) and at least 16 species of primates, including a new species of saki monkey being described by Dr. Janice Chism (Winthrop University).

Some of the wildlife that inhabits the ACRCTT area are monkeys the huapo Colorado or red bald uakari (Cacajao calvus ucayalii), the squirrel monkey (Saimiri sciureus), the red howler monkey (Alouatta seniculus); the pink dolphin (Inia geoffrensis), the grey dolphin (Sotalia fluviatilis), the brown-throated sloth (Bradypus variegatus), the capybara (Hydrochoerus hydrochaeris), the spectacled caiman (Caiman crocodilus), the black caiman (Melanosuchus niger), the South American tapir (Tapirus terrestris), the giant river otter (Pteronura brasiliensis), the giant anteater (Myrmecophaga tridactyla), giant armadillo (Priodontes maximus), jaguar (Panthera onca), the Amazonian manatee (Trichechus inunguis), the wattled curassow (Crax globulosa), the hoatzin (Opisthocomus hoazin), the harpy eagle (Harpia harpyja), among others.

== Climate ==
ACRCTT is located on the Amazon rainforest, near the Amazon River. This protected area is located on the lowland jungle (Spanish: selva baja) also known as Omagua region or Amazon basin. It has annual temperatures ranging from 25 °C (77 °F) to 33 °C (91 °F) and an annual rainfall of 3,000 millimetres (120 in)

== Tourism and activities ==
It is possible to visit the ACRCTT year-round; however, the busiest season for visitors is from June to August. This is also the high tourist season throughout Peru.

As of 2025, there are several tourism facilities operating in areas near the ACRCTT, with the ability to offer excursions into the reserve. Most tourism facilities are a 3-4 hour speed boat ride from Iquitos or a 90-minute drive to Nauta, followed by a 1-2 hour speed boat ride.

Many of these lodges offer private bungalows with private bathrooms and most lodges now have electricity - some via solar power - and WiFi. Tahuayo Lodge, Grand Amazon Lodge, Muyuna Lodge and Curassow Lodge are all built within the border areas of the reserve as no new construction is permitted within the reserve's formal boundaries.

The only tourism facility located entirely within the reserve is Amazonia Expeditions secondary lodge, the Amazon Research Center Lodge. This is the only man-made structure that exists within the over 1 million acre conservation area as it was grandfathered in after the creation of the reserve.

Visitors partake in boating on rivers, lagoons and oxbow, hiking and camping. These activities are focused on wildlife observation. Also travelers may fish and navigate the Amazon River.

ACRCTT has great biodiversity and spans over an important flyway of migratory birds hence it is popular for bird watching and bird photography also.

== See also ==
- List of protected areas of Peru
- Peruvian Amazon
- Tourism in Peru
- Iperu, tourist information and assistance

== Bibliography ==
- The Field Museum (2003), Rapid Biological Inventories 11 Peru: Yavarí. Rapid Biological Inventory 11
- Puertas, Eloy (1999), Hunting Effort Analysis In Northeastern Peru: The Case Of The Reserva Comunal Tamshiyacu-Tahuayo, University of Florida (1999).
