= Eschatogonia angustiloba =

Scientific classification
- Kingdom: Fungi
- Division: Ascomycota
- Class: Lecanoromycetes
- Order: Lecanorales
- Family: Ramalinaceae
- Genus: Eschatogonia
- Species: E. angustiloba

Binomial name
- Eschatogonia angustiloba Timdal (2008)
- Holotype: Jenaro Herrera, Peru

Species of lichen

Eschatogonia angustiloba is a species of corticolous (bark-dwelling) squamulose lichen in the family Ramalinaceae. Formally described as a new species in 2008, it is distinguished by its very narrow, thread-like lobes that are typically only 0.1–0.3 mm wide, much narrower than those of the related E. prolifera. It forms loose patches of overlapping scales on tree bark and shows considerable chemical variation, with different populations containing distinct suites of secondary metabolites. The lichen is known from lowland and sub-montane tropical rainforests in Brazil, the Peruvian Amazon and Suriname, where it grows on the lower bark of standing tree trunks in undisturbed forest environments.

== Taxonomy ==
Eschatogonia angustiloba is a squamulose (scale-forming) member of the family Ramalinaceae that was formally described as new to science by the Norwegian lichenologist Einar Timdal in 2008. Within the genus, it is most easily distinguished from the widespread E. prolifera by its far narrower, linear lobes (usually 0.1–0.3 mm wide) that often roll slightly upwards at the tips; the lobes of E. prolifera are typically more irregular and two to three times broader. Timdal observed both species growing intermixed on the same tree trunks, confirming that the narrow-lobed morphology is stable and not an environmentally induced variant.

Chemical data further support the species rank of E. angustiloba. Peruvian material falls into three chemotypes, each characterised by different suites of secondary metabolites (e.g. sekikaic acid with or without homosekikaic acid, unidentified xanthones, and the triterpenoid zeorin), none of which matches the didymic acid profile typical of South American E. prolifera. A fourth chemotype, known from a single Surinamese collection, has yet another unique set of compounds. Despite this chemical variability, no consistent morphological or anatomical differences separate the chemotypes, so they were treated by Timdal as in-species variation within E. angustiloba.

== Description ==
The thallus of Eschatogonia angustiloba forms loose patches of overlapping scales (squamules) that measure 1–2 mm across but are deeply cut into thread-like lobes only 0.1–0.3 (rarely up to 0.6) mm wide. These lobes are usually flat to slightly convex and may become faintly rolled back (revolute) near the tips. Their upper surface is matt green, sometimes tinged yellowish or brownish, and lacks any powdery bloom (pruina). Tiny, finger-like offshoots (lobules) often sprout from the squamule margins, giving older thalli a finely frilled appearance. The medulla (the inner layer) contains minute crystals that dissolve in potassium hydroxide solution, a reaction frequently used to help identify species.

Fruiting bodies (apothecia) are uncommon but, when present, appear as pale-brown discs up to 1 mm in diameter that become slightly domed with age; their margin soon blends into the surrounding thallus. The microscopic spores are narrowly ellipsoid to rod-shaped, usually with no septum or just one, and measure 9–13 × 2.5–3 μm. Conidial structures (pycnidia) have not been observed. Thin-layer chromatography confirms the presence of several polyphenolic acids and the triterpene compound zeorin, but the precise cocktail of substances differs among collections.

== Habitat and distribution ==
At the time of its original publication, Eschatogonia angustiloba had been recorded from six rainforest localities in the Peruvian Amazon (100–1000 m elevation) and from a single site in Suriname. All known populations occur in undisturbed lowland or sub-montane tropical rainforest, where the lichen grows on the lower, often mossy, bark of standing tree trunks. In Peru it commonly shares the same substrates with E. prolifera, E. dissecta, and E. minuta, indicating that safe microclimate conditions on shaded trunks allow several close relatives from the same genus to coexist.

Field observations indicate that E. angustiloba is locally frequent wherever suitable primary forest remains. Its reliance on intact rainforest habitat makes it a potential indicator of undisturbed corticolous lichen communities in western Amazonia. It was reported from the Brazilian Amazon in 2017.
