= Acaté Amazon Conservation =

Acaté Amazon Conservation is a non-profit organization founded in 2012 by physician-ethnobotanist Christopher Herndon, M.D. and sustainable agriculturist William Park. Acaté Amazon Conservation works with the indigenous people of the Peruvian Amazon to help protect the Amazon rainforest while providing the indigenous people economic opportunities. Notable initiatives include permaculture methods for sustainable agriculture, generating income through renewable non-timber resources as well as preservation of traditional knowledge and culture.

== Three Pillars of Acaté ==
Working directly with the Matsés people, one of the largest indigenous populations in the Peruvian Amazon rainforest, Acaté Amazon Conservation is implementing strategic programs that provide much needed revenue without destroying their land and chosen way of life.

=== Sustainable Economy ===
Acaté has developed alternative approaches for viable long-term generation of revenue for Matsés communities that provides alternatives for unsustainable and destructive activities. These include the sustainable harvest and marketing of non-timber forest products with medicinal or cosmetic value, such as copaiba and sangre de grado.

=== Indigenous Medicine ===
Acaté Amazon Conservation seeks to maintain self-sufficiency of health care through the promotion of traditional systems of medicine. Acaté provides programmatic support for elder tribal shamans to teach and impart the knowledge of the rainforest to younger generations of Matsés and has successfully completed the first medicinal encyclopedia in the Matsés language, documenting and thus preserving the use of medicinal plants for the benefit of future generations.

=== Permaculture Methods for Sustainable Agriculture ===
Acaté is working with traditional Matsés tribes to build sustainable and resilient living systems that provide food staples for their communities. Acaté is implementing projects with the communities to apply concepts of permaculture, the goal being to adapt the Matsés farming practices around their fixed settlements to more sustainable methods thereby increasing the local biodiversity.

== History ==
=== Etymology ===
Acaté Amazon Conservation is named after the indigenous term for the giant monkey tree frog, 'Acaté', scientific name Phyllomedusa bicolor used ceremonially by the Matsés people in Peruvian Amazon. The skin secretions of the Acaté frog have been shown to contain powerful antimicrobial and angiostatic properties.
