= Eschatogonia triptophyllina =

Scientific classification
- Domain: Eukaryota
- Kingdom: Fungi
- Division: Ascomycota
- Class: Lecanoromycetes
- Order: Lecanorales
- Family: Ramalinaceae
- Genus: Eschatogonia
- Species: E. triptophyllina

Binomial name
- Eschatogonia triptophyllina (Nyl.) Kalb (2004)

Synonyms
- Lecidea triptophyllina Nyl. (1863); Thalloidima triptophyllinum (Nyl.) Müll.Arg. (1893); Psorella triptophyllina (Nyl.) Zahlbr. (1926)

Species of lichen

Eschatogonia triptophyllina is a rare species of lichen in the family Ramalinaceae. It was first described in 1863 by the Finnish lichenologist William Nylander as Lecidea triptophyllina and was transferred to the genus Eschatogonia by Klaus Kalb in 2004. The species is distinguished by its tiny, intricately scalloped squamules, reddish-brown apothecia (fruiting bodies), and complete absence of detectable lichen products, and is known from only a single collection with an uncertain tropical location.

== Taxonomy ==
It was first described as a new species in 1863 by the Finnish lichenologist William Nylander, who classified it in the genus Lecidea. After having been proposed for placement in the genera Thalloidima and Psorella in its taxonomic history, Klaus Kalb transferred the species to Eschatogonia in 2004. It is one of the three "classical" species that were recognised in the genus before Amazonian work added several new taxa. Einar Timdal's revision notes that the species lacks all detectable lichen products and develops reddish-brown apothecia, a chemical–morphological signature that immediately separates it from the chemically variable E. dissecta and the zeorin- or didymic acid-bearing E. prolifera. The lectotype held in Helsinki (specimen H-NYL 17338) is, as of 2008, the only unequivocal collection that can be referred to this taxon.

== Description ==
The thallus of Eschatogonia triptophyllina is composed of tiny, scale-like squamules with lobes that are extremely short and intricately scalloped or shallowly cut, imparting a delicate, frilled appearance that remains evident even through a hand lens. While still closely attached to the bark when young, the lobes tend to lift slightly as they mature, creating a subtle three-dimensional texture. Unlike most others in the genus, no crystals or colour-forming acids can be demonstrated in the medulla using thin-layer chromatography or standard chemical spot tests, and the cortex remains matt green throughout.

Fruiting bodies (apothecia) are reddish brown and convex; detailed spore measurements remain uncertain. The protologue reported acicular (needle-shaped) spores 23–32 μm long, whereas T. D. V. Swinscow and Hildur Krog later gave a range of 40–55 μm; Timdal could not find mature spores in the lectotype to resolve the discrepancy. No asexual propagules have been observed in this species.

== Habitat and distribution ==
Little is known about the ecology of E. triptophyllina. The lectotype label indicates a corticolous habit (growing on bark) in tropical rainforest, consistent with other members of the genus, but gives no precise locality beyond the broad "tropical America/Africa" range historically ascribed to Eschatogonia. Timdal points out that E. triptophyllina is "known from only one collection" and was not encountered during extensive surveys in Amazonian Peru.
