= Nu-nu =

Tobacco based herbal stimulant

Nu-nu is a herbal stimulant used by the Matsés people of the Amazon to prepare men for a successful hunt.

== Recipe ==
To prepare the snuff, the powdered roasted leaves of mapacho (Nicotiana rustica) are mixed with alkaline ashes of the inner bark of the mocambo tree (Theobroma bicolor), which, in the proper amount, improves the absorption of the drug while lessening the nasal irritation. The leaves and alkali are ground into a very fine powder and mixed.

== Consumption ==
A Matsés man administers the prepared snuff by blowing the powder through a bamboo tube into the recipient's nostril. Under the effects of the drug, the recipient is said to have visions of the location of game (such as peccary) in the surrounding rainforest. A Matsés man may receive as many as four doses of nu-nu in each nostril.

Alternatively, nu-nu is also taken sublingually, to much milder effect.

== See also ==
- Anadenanthera peregrina, a plant whose seeds are also used to prepare a psychotropic snuff
- Insufflation (medicine)
- Peruvian Amazon
