= Maquia =

Maquia may refer to:

- Maquia: When the Promised Flower Blooms, a 2018 Japanese film
- Maquia District, a district of Requena Province, Peru
