= Solar eclipse of April 29, 1995 =

20th-century annular solar eclipse

- Annular eclipse
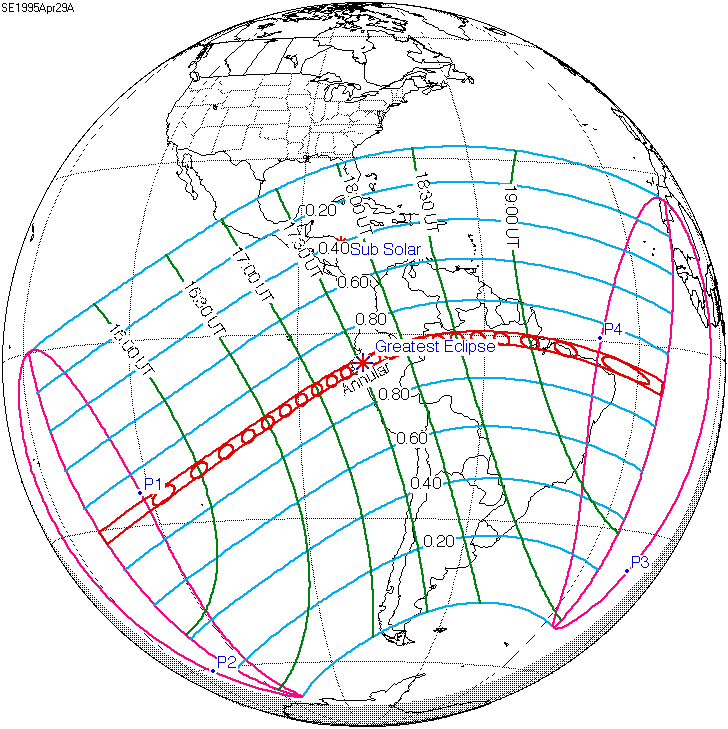
- Map
- Gamma: −0.3382
- Magnitude: 0.9497

Maximum eclipse
- Duration: 397 s (6 min 37 s)
- Coordinates: 4.8°S 79.4°W
- Max. width of band: 196 km (122 mi)

Times (UTC)
- Greatest eclipse: 17:33:20

References
- Saros: 138 (30 of 70)
- Catalog # (SE5000): 9497

An annular solar eclipse occurred at the Moon's descending node of orbit on Saturday, April 29, 1995, with a magnitude of 0.9497. A solar eclipse occurs when the Moon passes between Earth and the Sun, thereby totally or partly obscuring the image of the Sun for a viewer on Earth. An annular solar eclipse occurs when the Moon's apparent diameter is smaller than the Sun's, blocking most of the Sun's light and causing the Sun to look like an annulus (ring). An annular eclipse appears as a partial eclipse over a region of the Earth thousands of kilometres wide. Occurring about 3.5 days before apogee (on May 3, 1995, at 1:50 UTC), the Moon's apparent diameter was smaller.

Annularity was visible in Peru, southeastern Ecuador, southeastern Colombia and Brazil. A partial eclipse was visible for parts of South America, Mexico, Central America, Florida, the Caribbean, and West Africa.

== Observations ==
A team of NASA's Johnson Space Center observed the annular eclipse near Puinahua District in the Peruvian Amazon rainforest. The weather was clear and the observations were successful.

== Eclipse timing ==
=== Places experiencing annular eclipse ===
Solar Eclipse of April 29, 1995 (Local Times)
Country or territory	City or place	Start of partial eclipse	Start of annular eclipse	Maximum eclipse	End of annular eclipse	End of partial eclipse	Duration of annularity (min:s)	Duration of eclipse (hr:min)	Maximum coverage
Peru	Piura	10:26:48	12:24:07	12:27:17	12:30:27	14:31:56	6:20	4:05	90.34%
Ecuador	Loja	10:32:09	12:32:19	12:34:20	12:36:21	14:37:40	4:02	4:06	90.35%
Brazil	São Gabriel da Cachoeira	12:16:26	14:21:41	14:22:22	14:23:03	16:09:12	1:22	3:53	90.03%
Brazil	Belém	14:22:07	16:03:15	16:05:55	16:08:35	17:28:45	5:20	3:07	89.02%
Brazil	São Luís	14:33:22	16:09:07	16:11:15	16:13:24	17:30:04	4:17	2:57	88.77%
Brazil	Parnaíba	14:39:34	16:11:48	16:14:01	16:16:15	17:30:35	4:27	2:51	88.62%
Brazil	Sobral	14:42:28	16:14:28	16:15:07	16:15:49	17:30:32	1:21	2:48	88.54%
Brazil	Fortaleza	14:46:28	16:14:54	16:16:49	16:18:43	17:30:45	3:49	2:45	88.44%
Brazil	Fernando de Noronha	15:57:40	17:18:52	17:20:58	17:23:04	18:06:30 (sunset)	4:12	2:09	88.11%

=== Places experiencing partial eclipse ===
Solar Eclipse of April 29, 1995 (Local Times)
Country or territory	City or place	Start of partial eclipse	Maximum eclipse	End of partial eclipse	Duration of eclipse (hr:min)	Maximum coverage
French Polynesia	Gambier Islands	06:18:43 (sunrise)	06:40:07	07:53:30	1:35	66.21%
Pitcairn Islands	Adamstown	06:31:40 (sunrise)	07:11:45	08:29:52	1:58	77.69%
Chile	Easter Island	08:37:23	09:58:02	11:33:42	2:56	76.71%
Peru	Lima	10:30:15	12:29:55	14:30:29	4:00	69.21%
Nicaragua	Managua	09:59:06	11:36:09	13:16:14	3:17	31.57%
Costa Rica	San José	09:54:41	11:39:29	13:26:12	3:32	40.97%
Ecuador	Quito	10:40:21	12:42:42	14:43:15	4:03	81.06%
Panama	Panama City	11:00:32	12:52:30	14:41:16	3:41	49.80%
Bolivia	La Paz	12:01:26	13:57:27	15:41:59	3:41	47.53%
Colombia	Bogotá	11:02:38	13:04:40	14:56:31	3:54	70.26%
Aruba	Oranjestad	12:35:12	14:24:28	16:00:49	3:26	46.45%
Curaçao	Willemstad	12:37:07	14:27:11	16:03:18	3:26	48.41%
Dominican Republic	Santo Domingo	12:55:14	14:28:06	15:51:24	2:56	27.69%
Caribbean Netherlands	Kralendijk	12:39:09	14:28:59	16:04:25	3:25	48.56%
Venezuela	Caracas	12:38:52	14:31:40	16:08:17	3:29	54.73%
Puerto Rico	San Juan	13:04:56	14:37:02	15:57:59	2:53	28.95%
Brazil	Manaus	12:39:40	14:40:28	16:17:47	3:38	85.11%
Grenada	St. George's	12:58:55	14:45:03	16:13:56	3:15	50.48%
Trinidad and Tobago	Port of Spain	12:56:24	14:45:07	16:15:35	3:19	55.31%
Guadeloupe	Basse-Terre	13:09:19	14:46:04	16:08:34	2:59	37.35%
Saint Vincent and the Grenadines	Kingstown	13:03:16	14:46:32	16:13:16	3:10	46.76%
Dominica	Roseau	13:08:23	14:46:40	16:10:06	3:02	39.63%
Martinique	Fort-de-France	13:07:27	14:47:11	16:11:30	3:04	41.92%
Saint Lucia	Castries	13:06:09	14:47:14	16:12:25	3:06	43.90%
Barbados	Bridgetown	13:08:05	14:49:56	16:15:04	3:07	46.94%
Guyana	Georgetown	12:59:52	14:51:12	16:21:37	3:22	68.65%
Brazil	Rio de Janeiro	14:33:36	15:54:10	17:02:08	2:29	30.47%
Brazil	Brasília	14:19:22	15:55:21	17:13:31	2:54	47.48%
Suriname	Paramaribo	14:08:24	15:57:02	17:24:37	3:16	71.60%
French Guiana	Cayenne	14:16:27	16:02:00	17:26:52	3:10	73.83%

== Eclipse season ==
This eclipse is part of an eclipse season, a period, roughly every six months, when eclipses occur. Only two (or occasionally three) eclipse seasons occur each year, and each season lasts about 35 days and repeats just short of six months (173 days) later; thus two full eclipse seasons always occur each year. Either two or three eclipses happen each eclipse season. In the sequence below, each eclipse is separated by a fortnight.

Eclipse season of April 1995
April 15 Ascending node (full moon)	April 29 Descending node (new moon)
Partial lunar eclipse Lunar Saros 112	Annular solar eclipse Solar Saros 138

== Related eclipses ==
=== Eclipses in 1995 ===
- A partial lunar eclipse on April 15.
- An annular solar eclipse on April 29.
- A penumbral lunar eclipse on October 8.
- A total solar eclipse on October 24.

=== Metonic ===
- Preceded by: Solar eclipse of July 11, 1991
- Followed by: Solar eclipse of February 16, 1999

=== Tzolkinex ===
- Preceded by: Solar eclipse of March 18, 1988
- Followed by: Solar eclipse of June 10, 2002

=== Half-Saros ===
- Preceded by: Lunar eclipse of April 24, 1986
- Followed by: Lunar eclipse of May 4, 2004

=== Tritos ===
- Preceded by: Solar eclipse of May 30, 1984
- Followed by: Solar eclipse of March 29, 2006

=== Solar Saros 138 ===
- Preceded by: Solar eclipse of April 18, 1977
- Followed by: Solar eclipse of May 10, 2013

=== Inex ===
- Preceded by: Solar eclipse of May 20, 1966
- Followed by: Solar eclipse of April 8, 2024

=== Triad ===
- Preceded by: Solar eclipse of June 28, 1908
- Followed by: Solar eclipse of February 27, 2082

=== Solar eclipses of 1993–1996 ===
This eclipse is a member of a semester series. An eclipse in a semester series of solar eclipses repeats approximately every 177 days and 4 hours (a semester) at alternating nodes of the Moon's orbit.

Solar eclipse series sets from 1993 to 1996
Descending node			Ascending node		
Saros	Map	Gamma	Saros	Map	Gamma
118	May 21, 1993 Partial	1.1372	123	November 13, 1993 Partial	−1.0411
128 Partial in Bismarck, ND, USA	May 10, 1994 Annular	0.4077	133 Totality in Bolivia	November 3, 1994 Total	−0.3522
138	April 29, 1995 Annular	−0.3382	143 Totality in Dundlod, India	October 24, 1995 Total	0.3518
148	April 17, 1996 Partial	−1.058	153	October 12, 1996 Partial	1.1227

=== Saros 138 ===
This eclipse is a part of Saros series 138, repeating every 18 years, 11 days, and containing 70 events. The series started with a partial solar eclipse on June 6, 1472. It contains annular eclipses from August 31, 1598 through February 18, 2482; a hybrid eclipse on March 1, 2500; and total eclipses from March 12, 2518 through April 3, 2554. The series ends at member 70 as a partial eclipse on July 11, 2716. Its eclipses are tabulated in three columns; every third eclipse in the same column is one exeligmos apart, so they all cast shadows over approximately the same parts of the Earth.

The longest duration of annularity was produced by member 23 at 8 minutes, 2 seconds on February 11, 1869, and the longest duration of totality will be produced by member 61 at 56 seconds on April 3, 2554. All eclipses in this series occur at the Moon’s descending node of orbit.

Series members 20–41 occur between 1801 and 2200:
20	21	22
January 10, 1815	January 20, 1833	February 1, 1851
23	24	25
February 11, 1869	February 22, 1887	March 6, 1905
26	27	28
March 17, 1923	March 27, 1941	April 8, 1959
29	30	31
April 18, 1977	April 29, 1995	May 10, 2013
32	33	34
May 21, 2031	May 31, 2049	June 11, 2067
35	36	37
June 22, 2085	July 4, 2103	July 14, 2121
38	39	40
July 25, 2139	August 5, 2157	August 16, 2175
41
August 26, 2193

=== Metonic series ===
The metonic series repeats eclipses every 19 years (6939.69 days), lasting about 5 cycles. Eclipses occur in nearly the same calendar date. In addition, the octon subseries repeats 1/5 of that or every 3.8 years (1387.94 days). All eclipses in this table occur at the Moon's descending node.

21 eclipse events between July 11, 1953 and July 11, 2029
July 10–11	April 29–30	February 15–16	December 4	September 21–23
116	118	120	122	124
July 11, 1953	April 30, 1957	February 15, 1961	December 4, 1964	September 22, 1968
126	128	130	132	134
July 10, 1972	April 29, 1976	February 16, 1980	December 4, 1983	September 23, 1987
136	138	140	142	144
July 11, 1991	April 29, 1995	February 16, 1999	December 4, 2002	September 22, 2006
146	148	150	152	154
July 11, 2010	April 29, 2014	February 15, 2018	December 4, 2021	September 21, 2025
156
July 11, 2029

=== Tritos series ===
This eclipse is a part of a tritos cycle, repeating at alternating nodes every 135 synodic months (≈ 3986.63 days, or 11 years minus 1 month). Their appearance and longitude are irregular due to a lack of synchronization with the anomalistic month (period of perigee), but groupings of 3 tritos cycles (≈ 33 years minus 3 months) come close (≈ 434.044 anomalistic months), so eclipses are similar in these groupings.

Series members between 1801 and 2200
October 9, 1809 (Saros 121)	September 7, 1820 (Saros 122)	August 7, 1831 (Saros 123)	July 8, 1842 (Saros 124)	June 6, 1853 (Saros 125)
May 6, 1864 (Saros 126)	April 6, 1875 (Saros 127)	March 5, 1886 (Saros 128)	February 1, 1897 (Saros 129)	January 3, 1908 (Saros 130)
December 3, 1918 (Saros 131)	November 1, 1929 (Saros 132)	October 1, 1940 (Saros 133)	September 1, 1951 (Saros 134)	July 31, 1962 (Saros 135)
June 30, 1973 (Saros 136)	May 30, 1984 (Saros 137)	April 29, 1995 (Saros 138)	March 29, 2006 (Saros 139)	February 26, 2017 (Saros 140)
January 26, 2028 (Saros 141)	December 26, 2038 (Saros 142)	November 25, 2049 (Saros 143)	October 24, 2060 (Saros 144)	September 23, 2071 (Saros 145)
August 24, 2082 (Saros 146)	July 23, 2093 (Saros 147)	June 22, 2104 (Saros 148)	May 24, 2115 (Saros 149)	April 22, 2126 (Saros 150)
March 21, 2137 (Saros 151)	February 19, 2148 (Saros 152)	January 19, 2159 (Saros 153)	December 18, 2169 (Saros 154)	November 17, 2180 (Saros 155)
October 18, 2191 (Saros 156)

=== Inex series ===
This eclipse is a part of the long period inex cycle, repeating at alternating nodes, every 358 synodic months (≈ 10,571.95 days, or 29 years minus 20 days). Their appearance and longitude are irregular due to a lack of synchronization with the anomalistic month (period of perigee). However, groupings of 3 inex cycles (≈ 87 years minus 2 months) comes close (≈ 1,151.02 anomalistic months), so eclipses are similar in these groupings.

Series members between 1801 and 2200
August 27, 1821 (Saros 132)	August 7, 1850 (Saros 133)	July 19, 1879 (Saros 134)
June 28, 1908 (Saros 135)	June 8, 1937 (Saros 136)	May 20, 1966 (Saros 137)
April 29, 1995 (Saros 138)	April 8, 2024 (Saros 139)	March 20, 2053 (Saros 140)
February 27, 2082 (Saros 141)	February 8, 2111 (Saros 142)	January 20, 2140 (Saros 143)
December 29, 2168 (Saros 144)	December 9, 2197 (Saros 145)	
