= Saquena District =

Coordinates: 4.6599°S 73.5565°W

Saquena
- District
- Interactive map of Saquena
- Country: Peru
- Region: Loreto
- Province: Requena
- Founded: July 2, 1943
- Capital: Bagazan

Government
  - Mayor: Rogelio Escudero Sanchez

Area
  - Total: 2,081.42 km^{2} (803.64 sq mi)
- Elevation: 112 m (367 ft)

Population (2005 census)
  - Total: 4,402
  - Density: 2.115/km^{2} (5.478/sq mi)
- Time zone: UTC-5 (PET)
- UBIGEO: 160507

Saquena District is one of eleven districts of the province Requena in Peru.
