= Eschatogonia =

Scientific classification
- Domain: Eukaryota
- Kingdom: Fungi
- Division: Ascomycota
- Class: Lecanoromycetes
- Order: Lecanorales
- Family: Ramalinaceae
- Genus: Eschatogonia; Trevis. (1853)

Type species
- Eschatogonia montagnei Trevis. (1853)

Genus of lichens

Eschatogonia is a genus of lichen-forming fungi in the family Ramalinaceae. It has seven species. The genus was circumscribed by the Italian lichenologist Vittore Benedetto Antonio Trevisan de Saint-Léon in 1853.

== Description ==
The genus Eschatogonia includes lichens with a squamulose thallus, meaning the body of the lichen is composed of small, scale-like lobes known as squamules. These squamules have a single layer of cortical (outer) tissue on both their upper and lower surfaces. The lichen's photobiont, or photosynthetic partner, is a green alga.

The apothecia (fruiting bodies) are sessile (directly attached to the surface without a stalk) and lack a thalline exciple, meaning they do not have a rim of thallus-derived tissue around them. The apothecia range in colour from flesh-toned (carneous) to reddish brown. Each ascus (spore-producing sac) within the apothecia typically contains eight spores. These spores are colourless and fusiform, meaning they are spindle-shaped, tapering at both ends.

== Species ==
- Eschatogonia angustiloba Timdal (2008) – Peru
- Eschatogonia dissecta Timdal & R.Sant. (2008) – Peru
- Eschatogonia granulosorediata M.M.E.Alves, Aptroot & M.Cáceres (2014) – Brazil
- Eschatogonia marivelensis (Vain.) Kalb (2004)
- Eschatogonia minuta Timdal & R.Sant. (2008) – Peru
- Eschatogonia prolifera (Mont.) R.Sant. (1988) – Kenya, Tanzania, West Africa and tropical America
- Eschatogonia triptophyllina (Nyl.) Kalb (2004)
