= Jenaro Herrera District =

Coordinates: 4.9827°S 74.3272°W

Jenaro Herrera
- District
- Interactive map of Jenaro Herrera
- Country: Peru
- Region: Loreto
- Province: Requena
- Founded: October 19, 1993
- Capital: Jenaro Herrera

Government
  - Mayor: Edvin Olbis Huanuire Taricuarima

Area
  - Total: 1,517.43 km^{2} (585.88 sq mi)
- Elevation: 110 m (360 ft)

Population (2005 census)
  - Total: 4,922
  - Density: 3.244/km^{2} (8.401/sq mi)
- Time zone: UTC-5 (PET)
- UBIGEO: 160510

Jenaro Herrera District is one of eleven districts of the province Requena in Peru.

== Climate ==
Climate data for Generao Herrera, Jenaro Herrera, elevation 103 m (338 ft), (1991–2020)
Month	Jan	Feb	Mar	Apr	May	Jun	Jul	Aug	Sep	Oct	Nov	Dec	Year
Mean daily maximum °C (°F)	31.7 (89.1)	31.6 (88.9)	31.6 (88.9)	31.5 (88.7)	31.3 (88.3)	30.8 (87.4)	31.1 (88.0)	32.0 (89.6)	32.4 (90.3)	32.5 (90.5)	32.1 (89.8)	31.4 (88.5)	31.7 (89.0)
Mean daily minimum °C (°F)	22.7 (72.9)	22.8 (73.0)	22.8 (73.0)	22.7 (72.9)	22.3 (72.1)	21.6 (70.9)	20.8 (69.4)	21.1 (70.0)	21.7 (71.1)	22.4 (72.3)	22.6 (72.7)	22.8 (73.0)	22.2 (71.9)
Average precipitation mm (inches)	206.2 (8.12)	219.4 (8.64)	293.1 (11.54)	259.6 (10.22)	220.6 (8.69)	171.5 (6.75)	138.0 (5.43)	136.2 (5.36)	140.2 (5.52)	181.5 (7.15)	189.6 (7.46)	238.6 (9.39)	2,394.5 (94.27)
Source: National Meteorology and Hydrology Service of Peru
