= Emilio San Martín District =

Coordinates: 5.8471°S 75.4382°W

Emilio San Martín
- District
- Interactive map of Emilio San Martín
- Country: Peru
- Region: Loreto
- Province: Requena
- Founded: January 22, 1912
- Capital: Tamanco

Government
  - Mayor: Fernando Maldonado Mosquera

Area
  - Total: 4,572.56 km^{2} (1,765.48 sq mi)
- Elevation: 120 m (390 ft)

Population (2005 census)
  - Total: 7,433
  - Density: 1.626/km^{2} (4.210/sq mi)
- Time zone: UTC-5 (PET)
- UBIGEO: 160504

Emilio San Martín District is one of eleven districts of the province Requena in Peru.
