= Tabernaemontana sananho =

Conservation status
- Least Concern (IUCN 3.1)

Scientific classification
- Kingdom: Plantae
- Clade: Tracheophytes
- Clade: Angiosperms
- Clade: Eudicots
- Clade: Asterids
- Order: Gentianales
- Family: Apocynaceae
- Genus: Tabernaemontana
- Species: T. sananho

Binomial name
- Tabernaemontana sananho Ruiz & Pav.

Synonyms
- Bonafousia sananho (Ruiz & Pav.) Markgr.; Merizadenia sananho (Ruiz & Pav.) Miers; Taberna poeppigii (Müll.Arg.) Miers; Tabernaemontana poeppigii Müll.Arg.

Species of plant

Tabernaemontana sananho is a tropical tree species in the family Apocynaceae known as lobo sanango. Lobo sanango grows in the Amazon Basin of northern South America.

== Chemical composition ==
The plant is reported to contain coronaridine, 3-hydroxycoronaridine, (-)-heyneanine, (-)-ibogamine and voacangine.

== Traditional use ==
In Amazonian traditional medicine, preparations of the leaves, pulp, bark, and latex are either applied topically or taken internally to treat various conditions. Extracts from the tree are antiinflammatory and effective against the protozoan Leishmania.

In Peru, this tree is sometimes known by the Spanish–Quechua name lobo sanango ("wolf plant") or simply as sanango. Throughout the Amazon the species has numerous other aliases in several languages. The Secoya people of Ecuador call this plant baĩ su'u and put the sticky liquid from the fruit into dogs' noses so they can "smell far in hunting." They also eat the fruit of baĩ su'u.

== Taxonomy and phylogeny ==
T. sananho is one of 126 species recognized by the Catalogue of Life as of March 2021. Phylogenetic studies suggest T. markgrafiana to be its closest relative with the following phylogenetic relationships:

- - - - T. alba
      - T. citrifolia
    - T. amygdalifolia
  - - T. columbiensis
    - - - T. sananho
        - T. markgrafiana
      - T. siphilitica

== See also ==
- Tabernaemontana palustris
