= Capelo District =

Coordinates: 5.3993°S 74.6938°W

Capelo
- District
- Interactive map of Capelo
- Country: Peru
- Region: Loreto
- Province: Requena
- Founded: July 20, 1946
- Capital: Flor de Punga

Government
  - Mayor: Alvaro Diaz Mego

Area
  - Total: 842.37 km^{2} (325.24 sq mi)
- Elevation: 118 m (387 ft)

Population (2005 census)
  - Total: 3,926
  - Density: 4.661/km^{2} (12.07/sq mi)
- Time zone: UTC-5 (PET)
- UBIGEO: 160503

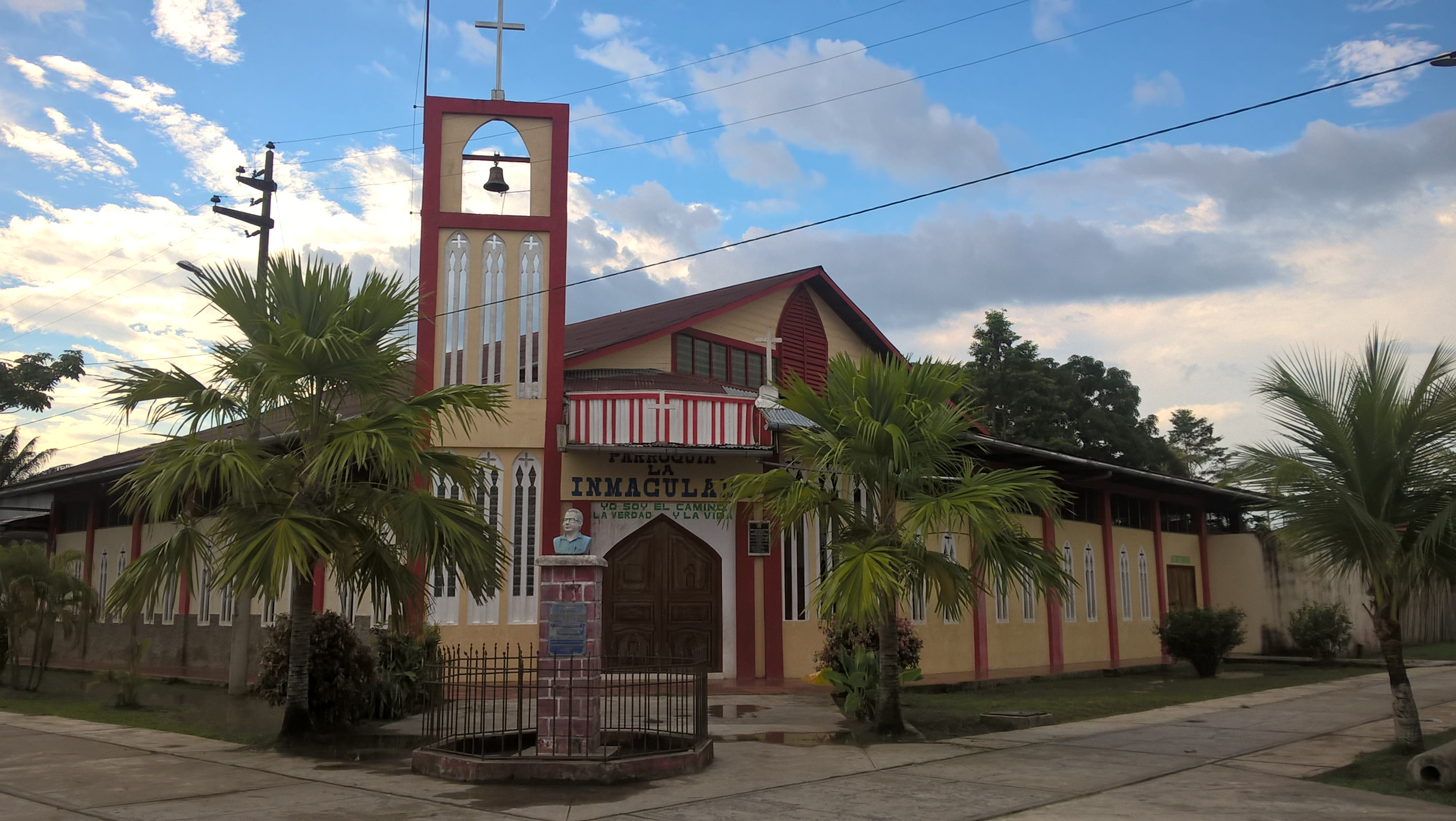
“La Inmaculada” church, Flor de Punga, Capelo District

Capelo District is one of eleven districts of the province Requena in Peru.
