= Requena District =

Coordinates: 5.0637°S 73.8586°W

Requena
- District
- Interactive map of Requena
- Country: Peru
- Region: Loreto
- Province: Requena
- Founded: July 2, 1943
- Capital: Requena

Government
  - Mayor: Orlando Ernig Jakers Huaymacari

Area
  - Total: 3,038.56 km^{2} (1,173.19 sq mi)
- Elevation: 114 m (374 ft)

Population (2017)
  - Total: 25,313
  - Density: 8.3306/km^{2} (21.576/sq mi)
- Time zone: UTC-5 (PET)
- UBIGEO: 160501

Requena District is one of eleven districts of the province Requena in Peru.

== Climate ==
Climate data for Requena, elevation 109 m (358 ft), (1991–2020)
Month	Jan	Feb	Mar	Apr	May	Jun	Jul	Aug	Sep	Oct	Nov	Dec	Year
Mean daily maximum °C (°F)	31.1 (88.0)	31.5 (88.7)	31.5 (88.7)	31.3 (88.3)	31.0 (87.8)	30.8 (87.4)	30.8 (87.4)	32.0 (89.6)	32.5 (90.5)	32.5 (90.5)	32.1 (89.8)	31.5 (88.7)	31.6 (88.8)
Mean daily minimum °C (°F)	22.5 (72.5)	22.4 (72.3)	22.4 (72.3)	22.4 (72.3)	22.1 (71.8)	21.7 (71.1)	21.5 (70.7)	21.8 (71.2)	22.2 (72.0)	22.5 (72.5)	22.6 (72.7)	22.5 (72.5)	22.2 (72.0)
Average precipitation mm (inches)	219.2 (8.63)	211.3 (8.32)	269.5 (10.61)	211.6 (8.33)	205.6 (8.09)	150.1 (5.91)	121.1 (4.77)	102.8 (4.05)	149.3 (5.88)	190.6 (7.50)	213.3 (8.40)	273.4 (10.76)	2,317.8 (91.25)
Source: National Meteorology and Hydrology Service of Peru
