= Tabernaemontana palustris =

Conservation status
- Least Concern (IUCN 3.1)

Scientific classification
- Kingdom: Plantae
- Clade: Tracheophytes
- Clade: Angiosperms
- Clade: Eudicots
- Clade: Asterids
- Order: Gentianales
- Family: Apocynaceae
- Genus: Tabernaemontana
- Species: T. palustris

Binomial name
- Tabernaemontana palustris Markgr.

Synonyms
- Homotypic Synonyms: Anacampta palustris (Markgr.) Markgr.; Bonafousia palustris (Markgr.) Boiteau & L.Allorge; Heterotypic Synonyms: Bonafousia rimulosa (Woodson) Boiteau & L.Allorge; Tabernaemontana rimulosa Woodson Ruiz & Pav.; Tabernaemontana tenuis Monach.

Species of plant

Tabernaemontana palustris is a tropical flowering plant species in the family Apocynaceae. It is native to Northern Brazil, Colombia, and Venezuela.

The species epithet palustris is Latin for "of the marsh" and indicates its common habitat.

In parts of the Peruvian Amazon, it is used medicinally to treat rheumatism, fever, and wounds; it may also be used as a purgative.

== See also ==
- Tabernaemontana sananho
