= Soplin District =

Coordinates: 6.0470°S 73.6253°W

Soplin
- District
- Interactive map of Soplin
- Country: Peru
- Region: Loreto
- Province: Requena
- Founded: July 20, 1946
- Capital: Nueva Alejandría

Government
  - Mayor: Ysabel Silva De Vargas

Area
  - Total: 4,711.38 km^{2} (1,819.07 sq mi)
- Elevation: 123 m (404 ft)

Population (2005 census)
  - Total: 665
  - Density: 0.141/km^{2} (0.366/sq mi)
- Time zone: UTC-5 (PET)
- UBIGEO: 160508

Soplin District is one of eleven districts of the province Requena in Peru.
