= Eschatogonia dissecta =

Scientific classification
- Kingdom: Fungi
- Division: Ascomycota
- Class: Lecanoromycetes
- Order: Lecanorales
- Family: Ramalinaceae
- Genus: Eschatogonia
- Species: E. dissecta

Binomial name
- Eschatogonia dissecta Timdal & R.Sant. (2008)
- Holotype: Jenaro Herrera, Peru

Species of lichen

Eschatogonia dissecta is a species of corticolous (bark-dwelling) squamulose lichen in the family Ramalinaceae. The species was formally described in 2008 by the lichenologists Einar Timdal and Rolf Santesson, based on material collected from lowland Amazonian rainforest in northern Peru. It is distinguished from related species by its very finely dissected, scale-like structures with thread-thin lobes only 0.08–0.2 mm wide and by its distinctive needle-like ascospores that are 26–40 micrometres long. The lichen is known from primary rainforests in Brazil, Peru, Venezuela, and French Guiana, where it grows on the shaded bark of tree trunks in consistently humid, undisturbed forest environments.

== Taxonomy ==
Eschatogonia dissecta is a squamulose lichen in the Ramalinaceae that was formally described in 2008 by the lichenologists Einar Timdal and Rolf Santesson, based on material collected in lowland Amazonian rainforest in northern Peru. Timdal and Santesson distinguished the species from the widespread E. prolifera and from E. angustiloba by its markedly finer, more deeply dissected squamules and by its much longer, needle-like (acicular) ascospores (26–40 μm). Chemically, the thallus contains homosekikaic acid, hyperhomosekikaic acid, or a mixture of the two, but it lacks zeorin and the didymic acid aggregate that typify other members of the genus. Field observations show E. dissecta growing intermixed with E. prolifera, corroborating the stability of its diagnostic characters even when both taxa share the same tree trunks.

Although three chemotypes are recognised, they show no consistent morphological or anatomical differences, so all collections are treated within a single, chemically variable species. The combination of small, deeply lobed squamules, acicular spores, and the homosekikaic acid profile provides a reliable set of characters for identification.

== Description ==
The thallus is composed of scale-like squamules 0.5–1 mm across that are soon carved into thread-thin lobes only 0.08–0.2 mm wide. While young the squamules lie flat against the bark, they become slightly up-curved and sometimes overlap as they age. Their upper surface is matt green, free of any powdery bloom, and bordered by a margin the same colour as the upper surface. Minute outgrowths (lobules) arise from the squamule edges and give older thalli a finely fringed appearance. Internally, the medulla contains tiny crystals that dissolve when a drop of potassium hydroxide solution is applied—an aid to spot testing in the field.

Fruiting bodies (apothecia) are occasional. They form pale-brown discs up to about 0.8–1.5 mm in diameter that become gently dome-shaped with age; their margin is initially paler but gradually merges with the disc. The ascospores are slender, needle-like cylinders (typically without a septum, or with only a faint one) measuring 26–40 × about 1.5 μm. No asexual propagules (pycnidia) have been observed. Thin-layer chromatography detects homosekikaic and/or hyperhomosekikaic acids as major constituents; no zeorin is present.

== Habitat and distribution ==
Eschatogonia dissecta is known from primary lowland to lower-montane rainforest in Peru, Venezuela, and French Guiana. In Peru the species has been recorded at three sites in the Amazonas Region between roughly 100 and 1000 m elevation, growing on the shaded, moss-flecked bark of standing trunks. All confirmed localities lie within undisturbed rainforest, where the lichen co-occurs with other members of its genus, such as E. prolifera. Outside Peru, scattered collections from French Guiana and Venezuela suggest that E. dissecta is part of a wider Guiana Shield–western Amazon element. In central French Guiana, it has been recorded from both lowland cloud forest and lowland rain forest. It was recorded from Brazil in 2012.

The species appears to favour consistently humid, shaded microsites near the base of trees, and it has not been reported from secondary forest or open woodland. Its association with intact corticolous lichen communities implies a degree of sensitivity to forest disturbance, so further surveys in well-preserved rainforest habitats are likely to yield additional populations.
