= Alto Tapiche District =

Coordinates: 6.0303°S 75.2048°W

Alto Tapiche
- District
- Interactive map of Alto Tapiche
- Country: Peru
- Region: Loreto
- Province: Requena
- Founded: July 20, 1946
- Capital: Santa Elena

Government
  - Mayor: Javier Villacorta Nacimento

Area
  - Total: 9,013.8 km^{2} (3,480.2 sq mi)
- Elevation: 121 m (397 ft)

Population (2005 census)
  - Total: 1,908
  - Density: 0.2117/km^{2} (0.5482/sq mi)
- Time zone: UTC-5 (PET)
- UBIGEO: 160502

Alto Tapiche District is one of eleven districts of Requena Province in Peru.
