= Maquia District =

Coordinates: 6.0118°S 75.8906°W

Maquia
- District
- Interactive map of Maquia
- Country: Peru
- Region: Loreto
- Province: Requena
- Founded: July 20, 1946
- Capital: Santa Isabel

Government
  - Mayor: Gonzalo Flores Aspajo

Area
  - Total: 4,792.06 km^{2} (1,850.22 sq mi)
- Elevation: 122 m (400 ft)

Population (2005 census)
  - Total: 8,487
  - Density: 1.771/km^{2} (4.587/sq mi)
- Time zone: UTC-5 (PET)
- UBIGEO: 160505

Maquia District is one of eleven districts of the province Requena in Peru.
