= Tabernaemontana markgrafiana =

Scientific classification
- Kingdom: Plantae
- Clade: Tracheophytes
- Clade: Angiosperms
- Clade: Eudicots
- Clade: Asterids
- Order: Gentianales
- Family: Apocynaceae
- Genus: Tabernaemontana
- Species: T. markgrafiana

Binomial name
- Tabernaemontana markgrafiana J.F.Macbr.

Synonyms
- Bonafousia longituba Markgr.

Species of plant

Tabernaemontana markgrafiana is a species of plant in the family Apocynaceae. It is found in Panama, and northwestern South America.
