= Puinahua District =

Coordinates: 5.2660°S 74.8438°W

Puinahua
- District
- Interactive map of Puinahua
- Country: Peru
- Region: Loreto
- Province: Requena
- Founded: July 2, 1943
- Capital: Bretaña

Government
  - Mayor: Arnulfo Tafur Navarro

Area
  - Total: 5,946.83 km^{2} (2,296.08 sq mi)
- Elevation: 118 m (387 ft)

Population (2005 census)
  - Total: 5,857
  - Density: 0.9849/km^{2} (2.551/sq mi)
- Time zone: UTC-5 (PET)
- UBIGEO: 160506

Puinahua District is one of eleven districts in the province of Requena in Peru.
