= Matsés =

Indigenous people of Peru and Brazil

Total population
- approx. 3,200 (various post-2000 est.)

Regions with significant populations
- Matsés Indigenous Reserve: approx. 2,000

Languages
- Matsés, many also speak Spanish or Portuguese.

Religion
- Christian, Animist

Related ethnic groups
- Matis, Korubo

The Matsés or Mayoruna are an Indigenous people of the Peruvian and Brazilian Amazon. Their traditional homelands are located between the Javari and Galvez rivers. The Matsés have long guarded their lands from other Indigenous tribes and struggle with encroachment from illegal logging practices and poaching.

The approximately 3,200 Matsés people speak the Matsés language which belongs to the Panoan language family. In the last thirty years, they have become a largely settled people living mostly in permanent forest settlements. However, they still rely on hunting and gathering for most of their subsistence. Their main source of income comes from selling peccary hides and meat.

== Name ==
The word Matsés comes from the word for "people" in the Matsés language. They are also known as the Mayoruna. The name Mayoruna comes from the Quechua (Runa Simi) language and means "river people." In Brazil the Matsés people are generally referred to as Mayorunas, while in Peru they are usually called Matsés.

== Technology ==
The Matsés have an elaborate knowledge of the plant and animal life of the surrounding rainforest. Little is imported into the Matsés communities and most of what they need for survival comes from the rainforest. Traditionally, they hunted with bows and arrows.

== Culture ==
Their cuisine includes the sweet plantain beverage chapo.

=== Worldview ===
In the animist Matsés worldview, there is no distinction between the physical and spiritual worlds, and spirits are present throughout the world. The Matsés believe that animal spirits determine health and success in hunting. They are careful not to offend animal spirits, and have many taboos for hunting different animal species.

Plants, especially trees, hold a complex and important interest for the Matsés. Each plant is associated with an animal spirit. When a plant product is used as a medicine, it is typically applied externally, and the shaman talks to the animal spirit associated with that plant.

=== Weapons ===
Bows and arrows are the main weapons of the Matsés culture, although they are currently rarely used in personal conflict. Generally they are only used for hunting animals. The Matsés were never known to use war clubs as do the neighboring Korubo. Historically, they used blowguns, similar to the Matis tribe of Brazil; however, they recently abandoned blowguns in favor of bows and arrows.

=== Marriage ===
Matsés families often practice polygamy. Cross-cousin marriages are most common. Marriages are primarily between cousins, with a man marrying the daughter of his father's sister (his aunt).

== Recent history ==
Compared to the other groups in the northern Pano subset, the Matsés have the largest population.

=== Contact with Indigenous and Non-Indigenous People ===
The origin of the Matsés is directly related to the merger of various Indigenous communities that did not always speak mutually intelligible languages. Historically, the Matsés participated in looting and planned raids on other Pano groups. The incentive for these attacks involved the massacre of that particular Pano group's Indigenous men, so that their women and children became powerless due to a lack of protection. The Matsés, consequently, would use their superiority and dominance, by killing off warriors of the other Indigenous' groups so that the women and children of the other groups would have no other choice but to join the Matsés, where they would have to assimilate. From approximately the 1870s to about the 1920s, the Matsés lost their access to the Javari River due to the boom of the rubber industry which was centered in the Amazon basin, where the extraction and commercialization of rubber threatened the Matsés lifestyle. During this period, the Matsés avoided conflict with non-Indigenous people and relocated to interfluvial areas, while maintaining a pattern of dispersal that allowed them to avoid the rubber extraction fronts. Direct contact between the Matsés and non-Indigenous people commenced around the 1920s. In a 1926 interview between Romanoff and a Peruvian man working on the Gálvez river, the Peruvian government declared that rubber bosses were unable to set up on the Choba river due to Indigenous attacks. These attacks ignited a response from the non-Indigenous people, who kidnapped Matsés woman and children. This resulted in intensified warfare, and successful Matsés attacks meant that they were able to recover their people, along with firearms and metal tools. Meanwhile, warfare between the Matsés and other Indigenous groups continued. By the 1950s, the wave of rubber tappers fizzled out and was later replaced by "logging activity and the trade in forest game and skins, mainly to supply the towns of Peruvian Amazonia."

=== Health ===
Presently, the Matsés have failed to receive adequate health care for over a decade. Consequently, diseases such as "malaria, worms, tuberculosis, malnutrition and hepatitis" have continued without reduction. The lack of organization and distribution of appropriate vaccinations, medication and prevention methods has resulted in high levels of deaths among the Matsés. The main problem is that most Indigenous communities lack medications or medical tools – microscopes, needles, thermometers – that help make basic diagnoses. For instance, Matsés today suffer "high levels of hepatitis B and D infections" and hepatic complications such as hepatitis D can cause death in a matter of days. It also causes the Matsés communities to distrust the use of vaccines. These people now fear falling ill, and do not receive clear information as to what caused the symptoms of their deceased kin. Sadly, "The Matsés do not know how many of them are infected, but the constant loss of young people, most of them under 30 years old, generates a pervasive mood of sadness and fear."

=== Education ===
In Brazil, Matsés communities are considered to be monolingual, so teachers are recruited from the community itself. Teachers tend to be elders; individuals that the community trusts to teach the youth although they have never completed formal teacher training. Attempts have been made to promote Indigenous teacher training. The state education secretary for the Amazons has been formally running a training course, but lack of organization means that the classes are offered only sporadically. Presently, only two Matsés schools exist, constructed by the Atalaia do Norte municipal council. Despite complaints from the Matsés communities, funding and construction of official Matsés schools is rare. As a consequence, Matsés parents, who hope to provide their family with higher education and greater job opportunities, send their children to neighbouring towns for their education. The lack of Matsés schools—that would have focused on Indigenous knowledge, culture, and language—consequently raises the likelihood of children assimilating into a culture unlike their own, decreasing the chances of cultural transmission to the next generation.

=== Other Materials ===
Comprehensive descriptions of the general Matsés culture can be found in Romanoff's 1984 dissertation; discussion of the Mayoruna subgroups history and culture can be found in Erikson's 1994 dissertation; and information about Matsés contemporary culture and history can be found in Matlock's 2002 dissertation. The first anthropologist to work among the Matsés was Steven Romanoff, who published an article on Matsés land use, a short article on Matsés women as hunters, as well as his Ph.D. dissertation. Works by Erikson (1990a, 1992a, and 2001) are all useful published ethnographic studies about the Matis in Brazil, which are relevant to the description of the Mayoruna subgroup, but lacking specific data on the Matsés. Luis Calixto Méndez, a Peruvian anthropologist, has also been working with the Matsés for several years. At first he did some ethnographic research among the Matsés, but in recent years his research has been restricted to administrative work for the Non-Government Organization Centre for Amazonian Indigenous Development.

The Matsés made their first permanent contact with the outside world in 1969 when they accepted SIL missionaries into their communities. Before that date, they were effectively at-war with the Peruvian government, which had bombed their villages with napalm and sent the Peruvian army to invade their communities to counter Matsés raids on villages to kidnap women for the tribe. At present, relations between the Matsés and the Peruvian government are peaceful. Dan James Pantone and Bjorn Svensson described the Matsés first peaceful contact with the outside world in an article in Native Planet. In their article, James and Svensson described the 1969 encounter between the Matsés with SIL linguists Harriet Fields and Hattie Kneeland. That same year, 1969, photojournalist Loren McIntyre made contact with the Matsés as described in Petru Popescu's book Amazon Beaming.

== Indigenous political reorganization ==
The Matsés are very divided and politically unorganized. Each village has its own chief and there is little centralized authority for the tribe. Lack of political organization has made it difficult for the Matsés people to obtain medical assistance from the outside world.

== Land rights ==
The Matsés have title to the Matsés Indigenous Reserve that was established in 1998. The reserve measures 457000 ha. Despite having title to their own reserve, living conditions for the Matsés have deteriorated. According to a 2006 article in Cultural Survival Quarterly by Dan James Pantone, living conditions have become much worse, to the point that the very survival of the Matsés people is in jeopardy. At present, there is a proposal to expand the Matsés Communal Reserve to give the Matsés people control over their traditional hunting grounds.

== Logging controversy ==
In September 2013, the Matsés chief announced plans to start logging the Matsés Native Community lands and rejected oppositions of environmental organisations which he claimed were manipulating Matsés students. In response, Matsés students claimed that the chief was being manipulated by loggers and demanded that the Matsés chief be removed for not defending the interests of his people.

== Municipality corruption ==
To make matters more complex for the Matsés people, in September 2013 the Matsés mayor (Andres Rodriquez Lopez) of the Yaquerana District was publicly accused of corruption by the municipal regulators who blocked his ability to use the municipal checking account. The municipality where the Matsés live has had a history of fraud and the ex-mayor, Helen Ruiz Torres, was sentenced to six years in jail for embezzling municipal funds.

== Conservation efforts ==
=== Acaté Amazon Conservation ===
Acaté Amazon Conservation is a non-profit that was founded in 2013, but existed since 2006 as a loose organization of its founders, Christopher Herndon, MD, and William Park. Acaté operates projects in the Peruvian Amazon rainforest, and integrates culture, health, and ecology into all of its projects. Its current projects include documenting and preserving the indigenous medicinal knowledge of the Matsés by completing the first traditional medicine encyclopedia written in the Matsés language, resiliency projects / programs utilizing permaculture techniques, and providing the Matsés economic opportunities with renewable non-timber natural products.

== See also ==
- Nu-nu, a snuff used by Matsés men
- Matsés massacre
