= Requena, Loreto =

Coordinates: 5.0569°S 73.8515°W

- Village
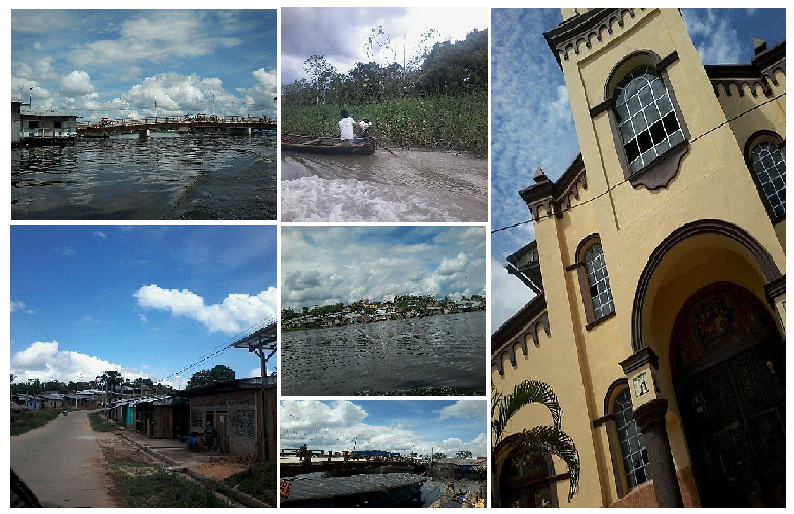
- Interactive map of Requena, Loreto
- Country: Peru
- Region: Loreto
- Province: Requena
- District: Requena
- Founded: 1907

Government
  - Mayor: Orlando Ernig Jakers Huaymacari
- Elevation: 114 m (374 ft)

Population (2017)
  - Total: 25,313
- Time zone: UTC-5 (PET)
- Climate: Af
- Website: www.munirequena.gob.pe

Requena is a town in the Loreto Region in northeastern Peru. It is the capital of both Requena Province and Requena District and has a population of 25,313 (2017 census).

== Climate ==
Climate data for Requena, elevation 109 m (358 ft), (1991–2020)
Month	Jan	Feb	Mar	Apr	May	Jun	Jul	Aug	Sep	Oct	Nov	Dec	Year
Mean daily maximum °C (°F)	31.1 (88.0)	31.5 (88.7)	31.5 (88.7)	31.3 (88.3)	31.0 (87.8)	30.8 (87.4)	30.8 (87.4)	32.0 (89.6)	32.5 (90.5)	32.5 (90.5)	32.1 (89.8)	31.5 (88.7)	31.6 (88.8)
Mean daily minimum °C (°F)	22.5 (72.5)	22.4 (72.3)	22.4 (72.3)	22.4 (72.3)	22.1 (71.8)	21.7 (71.1)	21.5 (70.7)	21.8 (71.2)	22.2 (72.0)	22.5 (72.5)	22.6 (72.7)	22.5 (72.5)	22.2 (72.0)
Average precipitation mm (inches)	219.2 (8.63)	211.3 (8.32)	269.5 (10.61)	211.6 (8.33)	205.6 (8.09)	150.1 (5.91)	121.1 (4.77)	102.8 (4.05)	149.3 (5.88)	190.6 (7.50)	213.3 (8.40)	273.4 (10.76)	2,317.8 (91.25)
Source: National Meteorology and Hydrology Service of Peru
