= Lasioglossum michiganense =

Scientific classification
- Domain: Eukaryota
- Kingdom: Animalia
- Phylum: Arthropoda
- Class: Insecta
- Order: Hymenoptera
- Family: Halictidae
- Tribe: Halictini
- Genus: Lasioglossum
- Species: L. michiganense

Binomial name
- Lasioglossum michiganense Nash

Species of bee

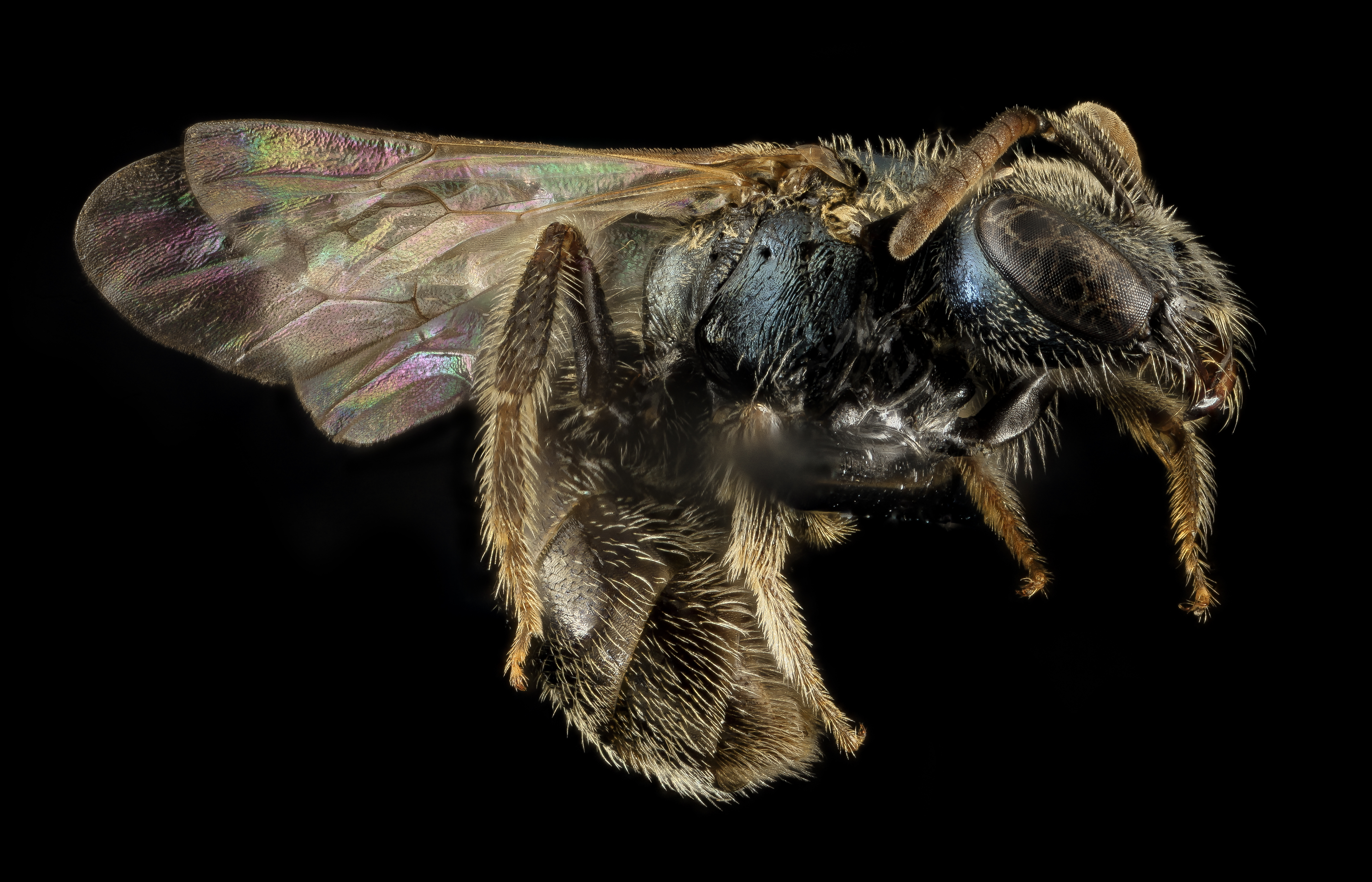
it is a cleptoparasite of other Lasioglossum species.

Lasioglossum michiganense is a species of sweat bee in the family Halictidae.
