= Yaquerana District =

Coordinates: 5.1492°S 72.8795°W

Yaquerana
- District
- Interactive map of Yaquerana
- Country: Peru
- Region: Loreto
- Province: Requena
- Founded: July 2, 1943
- Capital: Angamos

Government
  - Mayor: Pepe Fasabi Rimachi

Area
  - Total: 10,947.2 km^{2} (4,226.7 sq mi)
- Elevation: 130 m (430 ft)

Population (2005 census)
  - Total: 2,445
  - Density: 0.2233/km^{2} (0.5785/sq mi)
- Time zone: UTC-5 (PET)
- UBIGEO: 160511

Yaquerana District is one of eleven districts of the province Requena in Peru.

== Climate ==
Climate data for Angamos, Yaquerana, elevation 101 m (331 ft), (1991–2020)
Month	Jan	Feb	Mar	Apr	May	Jun	Jul	Aug	Sep	Oct	Nov	Dec	Year
Mean daily maximum °C (°F)	31.1 (88.0)	31.2 (88.2)	30.9 (87.6)	30.9 (87.6)	30.5 (86.9)	30.5 (86.9)	30.7 (87.3)	32.0 (89.6)	32.2 (90.0)	31.9 (89.4)	31.7 (89.1)	31.5 (88.7)	31.3 (88.3)
Mean daily minimum °C (°F)	22.2 (72.0)	22.2 (72.0)	22.3 (72.1)	22.0 (71.6)	21.6 (70.9)	21.1 (70.0)	20.5 (68.9)	21.0 (69.8)	21.4 (70.5)	22.0 (71.6)	22.3 (72.1)	22.4 (72.3)	21.8 (71.1)
Average precipitation mm (inches)	258.7 (10.19)	245.4 (9.66)	298.6 (11.76)	253.2 (9.97)	234.5 (9.23)	167.6 (6.60)	130.5 (5.14)	124.6 (4.91)	146.3 (5.76)	210.2 (8.28)	234.9 (9.25)	290.6 (11.44)	2,595.1 (102.19)
Source: National Meteorology and Hydrology Service of Peru
