= Requena province =

Coordinates: 5°04′12″S 73°54′36″W

Requena
- Province
- Coat of arms
- Requena Province Location of Requena in the Loreto Region
- Country: Peru
- Region: Loreto
- Founded: July 2, 1943
- Capital: Requena

Government
  - Mayor: Orlando Ernig Jakers Huaymacari

Area
  - Total: 49,477.8 km^{2} (19,103.5 sq mi)
- Elevation: 114 m (374 ft)

Population
  - Total: 58,511
  - Density: 1.1826/km^{2} (3.0628/sq mi)
- UBIGEO: 1605
- Website: www.munirequena.gob.pe

Requena is one of the eight provinces in the Loreto Region of Peru. It was created by Law No. 9815 on July 2, 1943 by president Manuel Prado Ugarteche. Its territory is part of the Amazon rainforest; as such, it is characterized by high temperatures, heavy rainfall and a wide diversity of plants and animals.

== Political division ==
The province is divided into eleven districts.

- Alto Tapiche (Santa Elena)
- Capelo (Flor de Punga)
- Emilio San Martín (Tamanco)
- Jenaro Herrera (Jenaro Herrera)
- Maquia (Santa Isabel)
- Puinahua (Bretaña)
- Requena (Requena)
- Saquena (Bagazan)
- Soplin (Nueva Alejandría)
- Tapiche (Iberia)
- Yaquerana (Angamos)
