= Jenaro Herrera =

- Village
- Location of Jenaro Herrera in Peru
- Coordinates: 4.9055783°S 73.6686202°W
- Country: Peru
- Region: Loreto
- Province: Requena
- District: Jenaro Herrera
- Founded: 1954
- Founder: Manuel Gordon Magne
- Time zone: UTC-5 (PET)
- Climate: Af

Jenaro Herrera is the capital of the Jenaro Herrera District in the Requena Province of Peru. The village was founded in 1954 by Manuel Gordon Magne, a lieutenant colonel (then a lieutenant) of the Guardia Civil del Perú. It is named for Jenaro Herrera, the first lawyer in Loreto, the region that encompasses the village.

== Climate ==
Climate data for Generao Herrera, Jenaro Herrera, elevation 103 m (338 ft), (1991–2020)
Month	Jan	Feb	Mar	Apr	May	Jun	Jul	Aug	Sep	Oct	Nov	Dec	Year
Mean daily maximum °C (°F)	31.7 (89.1)	31.6 (88.9)	31.6 (88.9)	31.5 (88.7)	31.3 (88.3)	30.8 (87.4)	31.1 (88.0)	32.0 (89.6)	32.4 (90.3)	32.5 (90.5)	32.1 (89.8)	31.4 (88.5)	31.7 (89.0)
Mean daily minimum °C (°F)	22.7 (72.9)	22.8 (73.0)	22.8 (73.0)	22.7 (72.9)	22.3 (72.1)	21.6 (70.9)	20.8 (69.4)	21.1 (70.0)	21.7 (71.1)	22.4 (72.3)	22.6 (72.7)	22.8 (73.0)	22.2 (71.9)
Average precipitation mm (inches)	206.2 (8.12)	219.4 (8.64)	293.1 (11.54)	259.6 (10.22)	220.6 (8.69)	171.5 (6.75)	138.0 (5.43)	136.2 (5.36)	140.2 (5.52)	181.5 (7.15)	189.6 (7.46)	238.6 (9.39)	2,394.5 (94.27)
Source: National Meteorology and Hydrology Service of Peru
