= Peruvian Amazonia =

Area of the Amazon rainforest

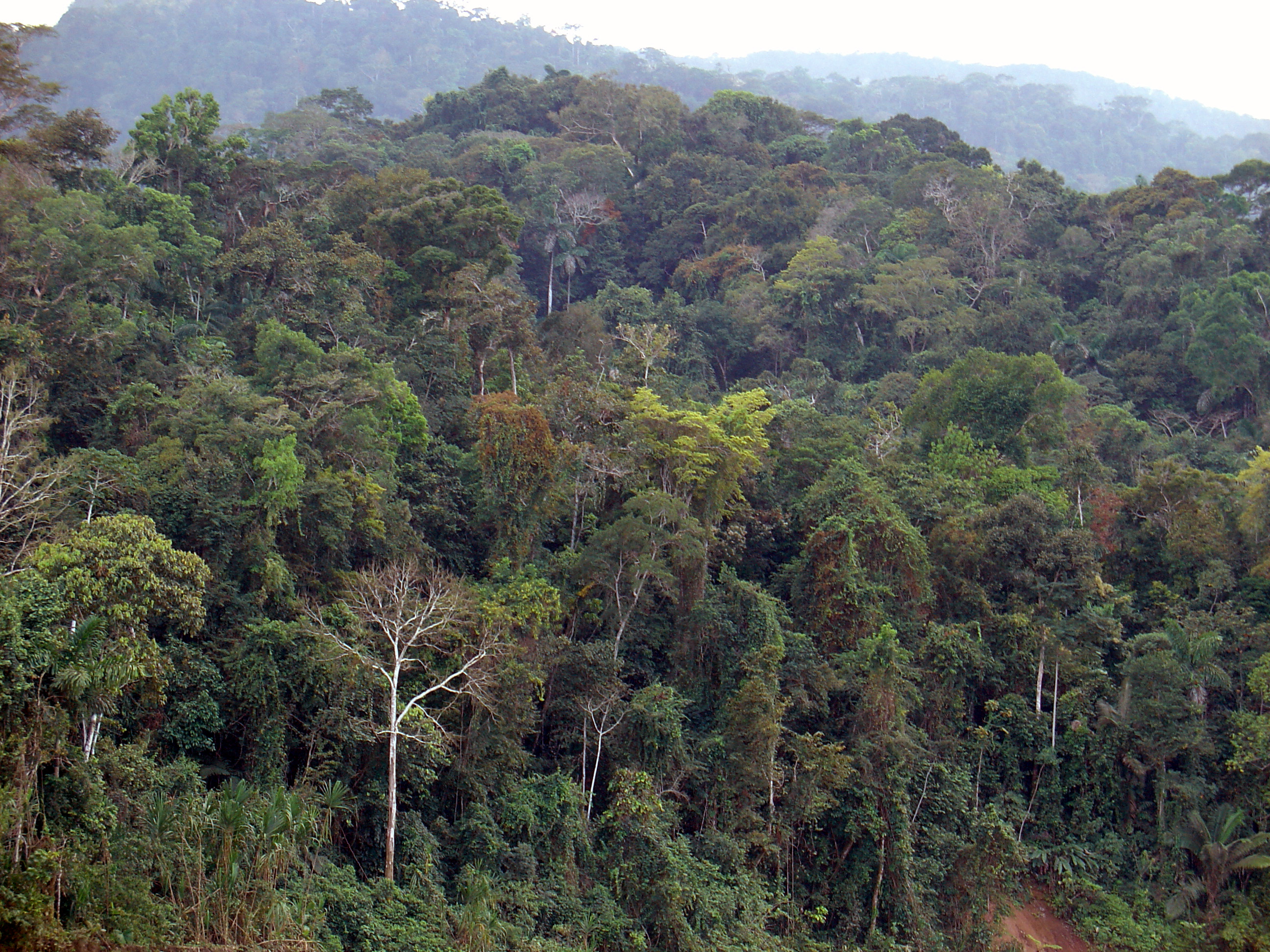
The Amazon rainforest in the Peruvian Amazonia

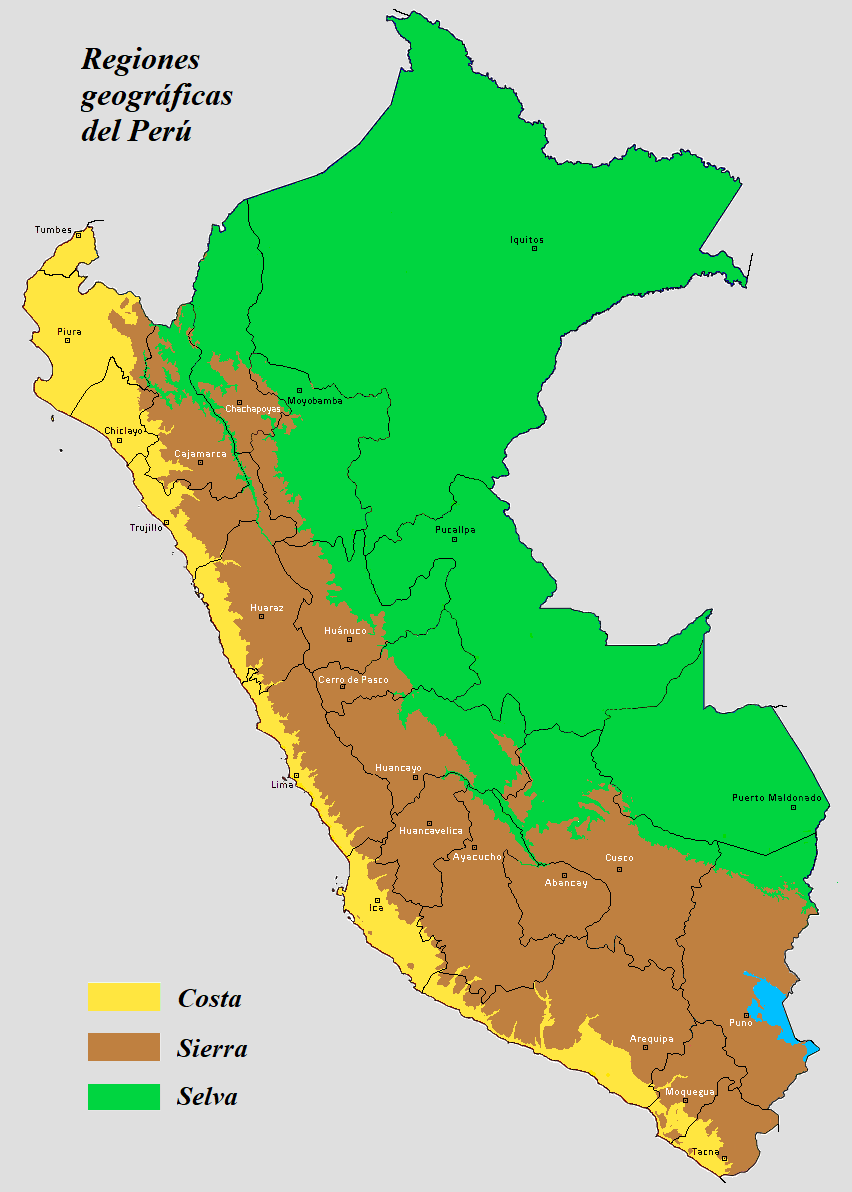
Map of the Amazon region in Peru (in green)

Peruvian Amazonia (Spanish: Amazonía del Perú), informally known locally as the Peruvian jungle (Spanish: selva peruana) or just the jungle (Spanish: la selva), is the area of the Amazon rainforest in Peru, east of the Andes and Peru's borders with Ecuador, Colombia, Brazil, and Bolivia. Peru has the second-largest portion of the Amazon rainforest after the Brazilian Amazon.

== Extent ==
Most Peruvian territory is covered by dense forests on the east side of the Andes, yet only 5% of Peruvians live in this area. More than 60% of Peruvian territory is covered by the Amazon rainforest.

According to the Research Institute of the Peruvian Amazon (Instituto de Investigaciones de la Amazonía Peruana, IIAP), the spatial delineation of the Peruvian Amazon is as follows:

- Ecological criteria: 782,880.55 km^{2} (302,271.87 sq mi) (60.91% of Peruvian territory and approximately 11.05% of the entire Amazon jungle).
- Hydrographic criteria or basin criteria: 969,224.7 km^{2} (374,219.7 sq mi) (75.31% of Peruvian territory and approximately 16.13% of the whole Amazon basin).

== Ecoregions and climate ==
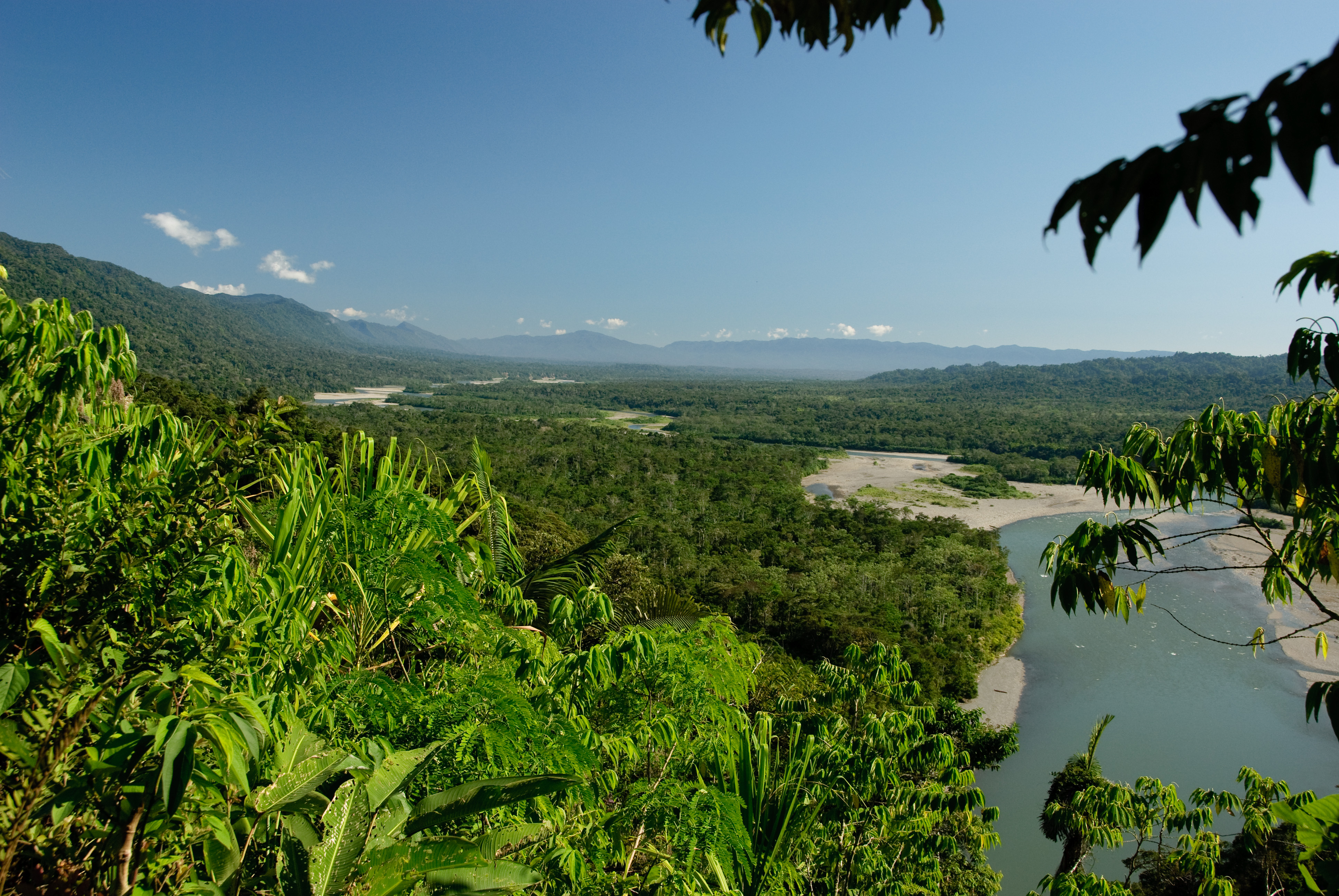
The Amazon rainforest in Manu National Park

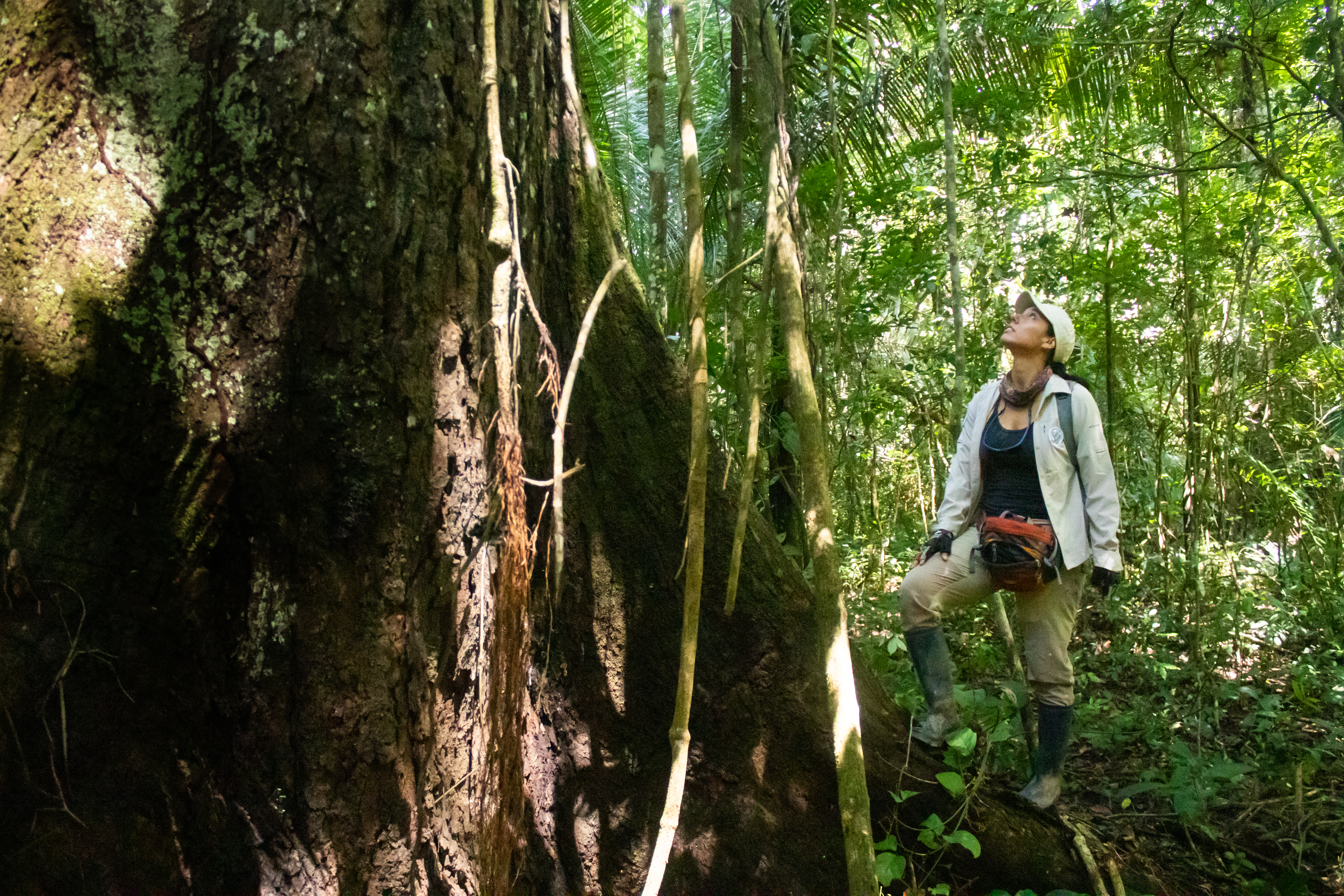
Peruvian researcher Tatiana Espinosa next to the Dipteryx micrantha tree

The Peruvian Amazon is traditionally divided into two distinct ecoregions:

=== Lowland Jungle ===
The lowland jungle (in Spanish Selva Baja) is also known as Omagua region, Walla, Anti, Amazonian rainforest or Amazon basin. This ecoregion is the largest in Peru, standing between 80 and 1,000 meters above sea level. It has very warm weather with an average temperature of 28 °C, high relative humidity (over 75%) and yearly rainfall of approximately 260 cm (100 in). Its soils are very heterogeneous, but almost all have river origins. Because of high temperatures and high rainfall, they are poor soils with few nutrients.

The jungle contains long and powerful rivers such as the Apurimac, Mantaro, Amazon, Urubamba, Ucayali, Huallaga, Marañón, Putumayo, Yavarí, Napo, Pastaza, Madre de Dios, Manu, Purus, and Tigre. The Apurímac River is the source of the Amazon River. The Pacaya-Samiria National Reserve, the Allpahuayo-Mishana National Reserve and the Tamshiyacu Tahuayo Regional Conservation Area are within the forest.

=== Highland Jungle ===
The highland jungle (in Spanish Selva Alta) is also called Rupa-Rupa region, Andean jungle, ceja de selva. This ecoregion extends into the eastern foothills of the Andes, between 1,000 and 3,800 m above the sea level. The eastern slopes of the Andes are home to a great variety of fauna and flora because of the different altitudes and climates within the region. Temperatures are warm in the lowlands and cooler in higher altitudes. There are many endemic fauna because of the isolation caused by the rugged terrain of the area.

Within the Amazon rainforest there are several other types of forest but they all have one characteristic in common: abundant rains. Over the course of a year, a portion of tropical forest will receive between 1,500 and 3,000 mm of rain. This creates the typical tropical atmosphere of a rainforest, with an average temperature of around 24 °C or more.

== Biodiversity ==
The Peruvian Amazon jungle is one of the most biologically diverse areas on Earth. As a nation, Peru has the largest number of bird species in the world and the third-largest number of mammals; 44% of bird species and 63% of mammal species inhabit the Peruvian Amazon. Peru also has a very high number of species of butterflies, orchids, and other organisms.

Taxa	Number of known species			Percentage of species	
Taxa	In the world	In Peru	In the Peruvian Amazon	Peru vs. world	Peruvian Amazon vs. Peru
Amphibians	5,125	403	262	8	65
Birds	9,672	1,815	806	19	44
Flowering plants	250,000	17,144	7,372	7	43
Ferns (Pteridophyta)	10,000	1000	700	10	70
Mammals	4,629	462	293	10	63
Butterflies (Lepidoptera)	16,000	3,366	2,500	21	74
Fish (river fish)	8,411	900	697	11	77
Reptiles	7,855	395	180	5	46

== Demography ==
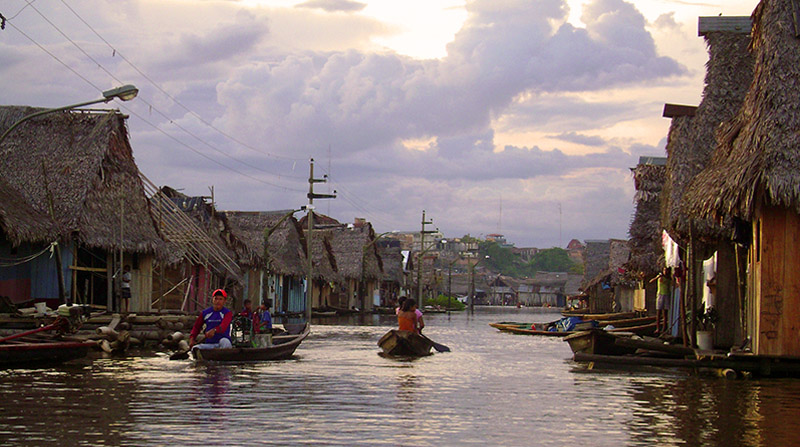
Amazon River floating village neighborhood in Iquitos

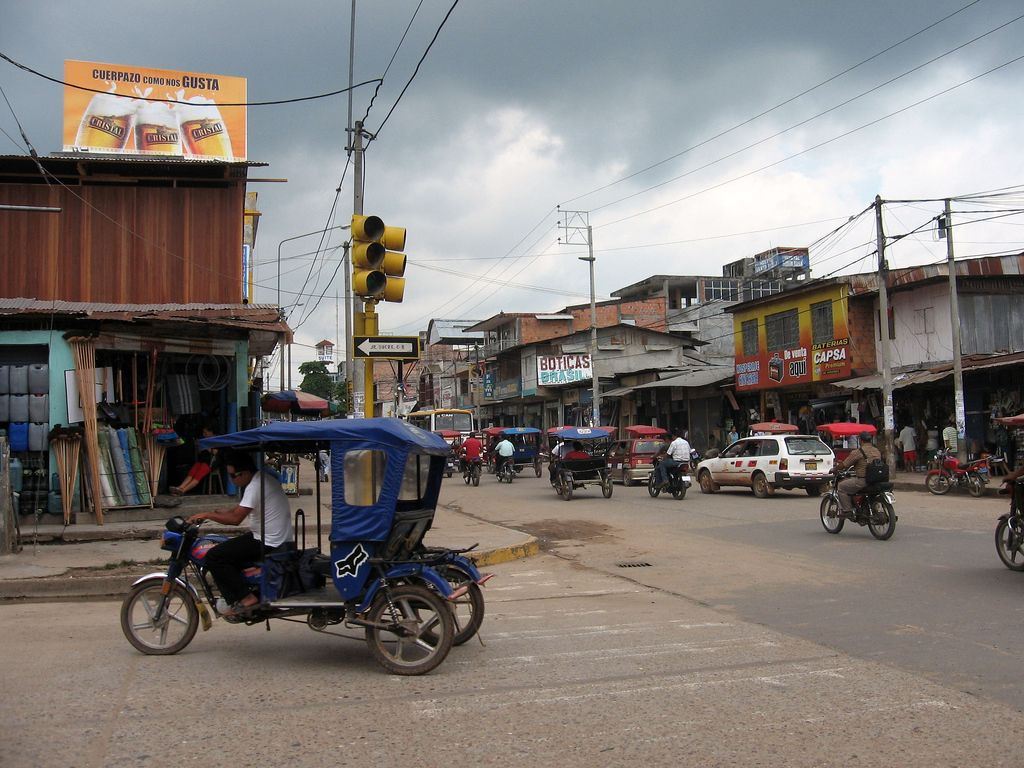
Mototaxis in Pucallpa

Although it is the largest region of Peru, the Peruvian Amazon is the least populated. It is home to approximately 5% of the country's population. Many indigenous peoples, such as the Aguaruna, Cocama-Cocamilla and the Urarina, inhabit the jungle, some in relative isolation from the rest of the world.

The primary cities located in the Peruvian Amazon include:

- Iquitos with 500,000 inhabitants at 104 m (Loreto region)
- Pucallpa, with 380,000 inhabitants at 154 m (Ucayali region)
- Yurimaguas with 140,000 inhabitants at 182 m (Loreto region)
- Puerto Maldonado with 104,000 inhabitants at 139 m (Madre de Dios region)
- Tarapoto with 181,000 inhabitants at 350 m (San Martín region)
- Jaén with 86,743 inhabitants at 729 m (Cajamarca region)
- Moyobamba with 77,000 inhabitants at 860 m (San Martín region)
- Bagua with 65,000 inh. at 400 m (Amazonas region)
- Rioja with 60,000 inh. at 848 m (at San Martín region)

== History ==
In the 1730s, Roman Catholic Franciscan missionaries established missions in the Gran Pajonal, but the missions were destroyed in the 1740s by the Asháninka under the leadership of Juan Santos Atahualpa. Several Spanish military expeditions tried to suppress the rebellion but failed or were defeated. The rebellion destroyed the missionary enterprise and left the Gran Pajonal in Asháninka control for 150 years although they suffered from periodic epidemics of European diseases and in the late 19th century from slave raids by businesses engaged in the gathering of rubber during the Amazon rubber boom.

== Illegal logging ==
Over the last decades illegal logging has become a serious problem in the Peruvian Amazon. In 2012 the World Bank estimated that 80% of Peru's timber exports are illegally harvested. This uncontrolled deforestation could negatively affect the habitats of indigenous tribes, the Peruvian biodiversity and contribute to climate change. Moreover, illegal deforestation might lead to more violent crimes. This has already been demonstrated on 1 September 2014, when four indigenous leaders were murdered, including the famous environmental activist Edwin Chota. These leaders were asking for governmental protection against illegal loggers, after being threatened several times. Partly due to this, illegal loggers are being blamed for the assassination.

=== Emergence of illegal industry ===
In an attempt to support local incomes in the Amazon, the Peruvian government granted non-transferable contracts to some farmers to perform small-scale logging activities. Soon however, big logging companies started paying individual loggers for the use of their contracts and established an illegal, large-scale logging industry. In 1992 the National Institute of Natural Resources (INRENA) was founded to guarantee a more sustainable use of national resources. Yet, this institution has never been able to carry out its task due to several reasons. First of all, INRENA lacked sufficient resources compared with the magnitude of their responsibilities. Next to this, corruption was a problem in several layers of the organisation. Moreover, until recently, INRENA was part of the Ministry of Agriculture. This suggests that INRENA was not completely independent; it was housed in an institution that had to safeguard the interest of the agricultural sector, which could be conflicting with INRENA's objective.

In 2000 Peru modified the Forestry and Wildlife Law in order to improve the logging sector. In the subsequent years however, the situation in the Peruvian timber industry only deteriorated. To some extent this can be explained by the fact that Brazil illegalised the exports of mahogany (one of the most valuable and endangered types of wood in the world) from 2001 on. This Brazilian ban is likely to have caused the increase in Peruvian mahogany exports. Soon after the ban, international institutions revealed their severe concerns about the state of the Peruvian timber industry. In particular the Convention on International Trade in Endangered Species of Wild Fauna and Flora (CITES), started paying extra attention to Peru as the trade in mahogany falls under CITES’ regulation. Albeit the fact that from then on, one needed special permits for harvesting and exporting any endangered species, the forestry sector was still far from sustainable.

=== Illegal logging with permits ===
Although it is understandable that illegal logging cannot be stopped easily in the Peruvian Amazons (an inaccessible area bigger than Spain), the illegal exportation of timber is supposed to be more difficult; the shipments are huge and there are very few routes from the Amazons to the coast. Nevertheless, until now it has been relatively easy for companies to ship and export illegal timber. Despite the fact that the Peruvian government claims that it does not know anything about the method used by these companies, it is common-knowledge.

The Environmental Investigation Agency (EIA) provided a clear picture of this mechanism in their report The Laundering Machine. According to them, the biggest flaw in the Peruvian system for years has been the granting of logging permits: 'Concessionaires submit for approval lists that do not exist in the real world, and complicit authorities approve the extraction of this non-existent wood'. These permits allow companies to transport almost all sorts of wood (both legal and illegal) out of the country. There are only two ways to stop illegal loggers: catching them in the act, or, in case of controlling a shipment, environmental prosecutors have to prove that the timber does not come from the place written on the permit (which is only possible by going to this place). With not more than a hundred environmental prosecutors in Peru, it is not surprising that both methods are far from effective.

=== The American-Peruvian Free Trade Agreement ===
The international attention levels increased again in 2007, when Peru and the United States (US) agreed on a new Free Trade agreement (FTA), which was implemented in 2009. According to the United States Trade Representative (USTR) the FTA included a number of binding commitments to ensure environmental protection, focussing on the Peruvian forestry sector. Both parties agreed, amongst others, on the following measures: establishing an independent forestry oversight body, penalising those who committed logging crimes, creating new (and a better implementation of existing) laws, developing an anti-corruption plan and the US would provide monetary help. Yet the results are ambiguous. On the one hand proponents claim that the forestry sector experienced significant improvements. Some (small) improvements are indeed visible. With the formation of the Supervisory Body of Forest and Wildlife Resources (OSINFOR), the first promise was met. Next to this, US officials started training Peruvian law enforcement officers, although only on a minor scale.

On the other hand, the FTA caused a lot of social unrest as indigenous groups expected the FTA to 'give incentives for further and irreversible destruction of virgin rainforest'. Local communities were not the only ones who criticised the agreement. In 2010 Public Citizen published an article, which stated that, despite all promises, 'environmental and labour conditions in Peru have deteriorated rapidly since the congressional passage of the FTA'.

Notwithstanding who was right, the FTA has not prevented illegal timber trade between Peru and the US. At least 35% of the Peruvian timber exports to the US between 2008 and 2010, contained illegal wood. This percentage however, only covers the trade in species that are regulated by the CITES. As only very few types of timber fall under this legislation, the real percentage of illegally harvested timber in Peru is assumed to be significantly higher.

== Illegal gold mining ==
Illegal gold mining is rampant among the Madre de Dios Region of Peru, and is extremely harmful to the environment. Individuals are mining more gold each year because of the exponential price hike in this commodity – a 360% surge in the last ten years. This price surge is driving many people who often are not able to attain jobs into the gold mining business because of the great financial gain. With the Interoceanic Highway available, "30,000 miners are estimated to be in operation without legal permits."

More mercury is being imported into the country than ever before for mining purposes because of the price increase. In mining, mercury is used to "amalgamate gold particles and then burned off – generally without even rudimentary technology". The import of mercury for this purpose is shown through atmosphere and water pollution, directly impacting human, animal, and plant lives in the area and beyond. Much of this contamination is a result of lack of education by the people directly mining the gold in Peru; “You can basically learn how to be a miner in a half an hour,” said Wake Forest University’s Center for Amazonian Scientific Innovation executive director, Luis Fernandez in 2021. The harmful impacts of gold mining in Madre De Dios can be seen from space.

== Illegal oil extraction ==
Oil extraction is a critical threat to the health of Peruvian Amazonia. While the land is potentially oil-rich, there are also many indigenous peoples living within the Amazon rainforest. The Camisea Gas Project on Lot 88 impacts the daily lives of indigenous residents. Project Camisea has numerous economic benefits, including savings of up to $4 billion in energy costs, however the environmental and cultural payoffs are widespread. In 2008, 150,000 square kilometers was set aside for oil drilling in the Western Amazon, and today that number has grown exponentially to over 730,000 square kilometers Direct destruction and deforestation often comes from the creation of access roads for oil and gas extraction. These roads then become catalysts for other illegal industries such as logging and gold mining

The plot of land where Camisea is located is on one of the most highly prioritized areas for biodiversity and conservation. In addition, these oil extraction projects impact the country through: fish stock decline, deforestation, pollution, disease and death of indigenous people, and roads and migration. The World Wildlife Federation concluded that the government has very little power over these oil sanctions, and there are countless loopholes in the policy, which makes stopping them in Peru extraction extremely difficult. Additionally, only seven percent of the oil blocs in the Western Amazon have been extracted, so there is potential for further illegal exploration in undiscovered areas.

== See also ==
- 2009 Peruvian political crisis
- List of Peruvian monkey species
