= Indigenous languages of South America =

Pre-Columbian languages of subcontinent

The indigenous languages of South America are those whose origin dates back to the pre-Columbian era. The subcontinent has great linguistic diversity, but, as the number of speakers of indigenous languages is diminishing, it is estimated that it could become one of the least linguistically diverse regions of the planet.

About 600 indigenous languages are known from South America, Central America, and the Antilles (see List of indigenous languages of South America), although the actual number of languages that existed in the past may have been substantially higher.

== Origins ==
The indigenous languages of South America, Central America and the Antilles completely covered the subcontinent and the Antilles at the beginning of the 16th century. The estimates of the total population are very imprecise, ranging between ten and twenty million inhabitants. At the beginning of 1980, there were about 16 million speakers of indigenous languages; three quarters of them lived in the Central Andes.

The number of existing tribes and ethnic groups is around 1500, although some authors have suggested it might reach 2000. However, it is uncertain if each of these groups has a unique language, so the figures likely indicate an upper bound for the actual number of languages spoken. For many of the known historical groups, there is no record of their language and many of them are extinct today. There is only one record of some 550 or 600 languages, with some 180 of them totally extinct today. In many cases, the fragmented records do not allow us to decide if they have to do with different languages or of divergent but mutually intelligible dialects of the same language.

=== Relationships with North America and Mesoamerica ===
Since the indigenous people of South America are historically from North America the problem of the origin involves looking for genetic and linguistic relationships with the indigenous groups of North America and Mesoamerica. Currently the only linguistic family of South America that shows a relationship with languages situated outside the region are the Chibchan languages, for which some evidence has shown that they are related to the Misumalpan and Lencan languages of Central America. In the 1970s, it was proposed that the Uru-Chipaya languages of Bolivia could be related to the Mayan languages of Mesoamerica, but while this proposal was initially accepted, Campbell argued very strongly against it.

=== Study of the South American languages ===
The first grammar of a South American language was that of classical Quechua published by Domingo de Santo Tomás in 1560. The missionaries of the seventeenth and first half of the eighteenth centuries carried out an intense activity of data collection, grammar writing (usually called language arts), dictionaries, and catechisms, in order to evangelize the indigenous populations. A good amount of linguistic records also appear in chronicles and official records. Much of the information from this period was summarized by Lorenzo Hervás y Panduro in his work Idea dell'universo (1778–87), and in the work by Johann Christoph Adelung and Johann Severin Vater Mithridates (1806–17). Subsequently, most of the information collected first hand was compiled by ethnographers in the first half of the twentieth century. Despite the magnitude and fundamental nature of the works of this period, its technical quality is below that achieved in other parts of the world, which is why South America, along with New Guinea, was one of the worst-known parts from a linguistic point of view.

Since the 1940s, the number of works about the languages of South America has grown significantly, carried out fundamentally by linguists and missionaries well trained in linguistics. However, there still exist many important gaps that affect the descriptive level, and few languages have been widely described. That has hurt comparative, historic, and typological work on the languages of South America. The descriptive work has had problems due to the shortage of linguists and the rapid extinction of many languages, often situated in remote and difficult to reach areas that require urgent study before they disappear completely. These languages produce scientific interest since their vocabulary reflects the traditional culture and contains important data about the fauna, flora, and local history of little-known regions. In addition, indigenous people have a right to bilingual education in some countries and for that education to be successful, it is important to rely on good descriptive material of indigenous languages.

=== Urheimat of some linguistic families ===
For some of the main linguistic families of South America, homeland groups have been proposed, or Urheimats, grouping them from where they originated. For example, it seems quite clear that Tupian languages expanded from Rondônia, which is an area of greater diversification; in fact, almost all Tupian languages outside of Rondônia belong to only one branch of the nine branches that form the Tupian family. This principle that the original area of a linguistic family is usually also the most diversified has been questioned by some authors, although it is one of the main tools to propose an area of original expansion for most language families. Recently, the phylogenetic relationship between Chibchan languages, Lencan languages, and Misumalpan languages has been demonstrated, which suggests that these languages originated in a region near the south of the Mesoamerican area and therefore, Chibchan languages will have expanded from the north to Panama and northeast of Colombia. Similarly, it is conjectured that the Caribbean languages would have expanded from east to west, and from there some groups moved to the eastern Amazon and others to the Caribbean islands, where they were expanding in the fifteenth century upon the arrival of the Europeans to America.

Map of the Amazon River and its drainage basin

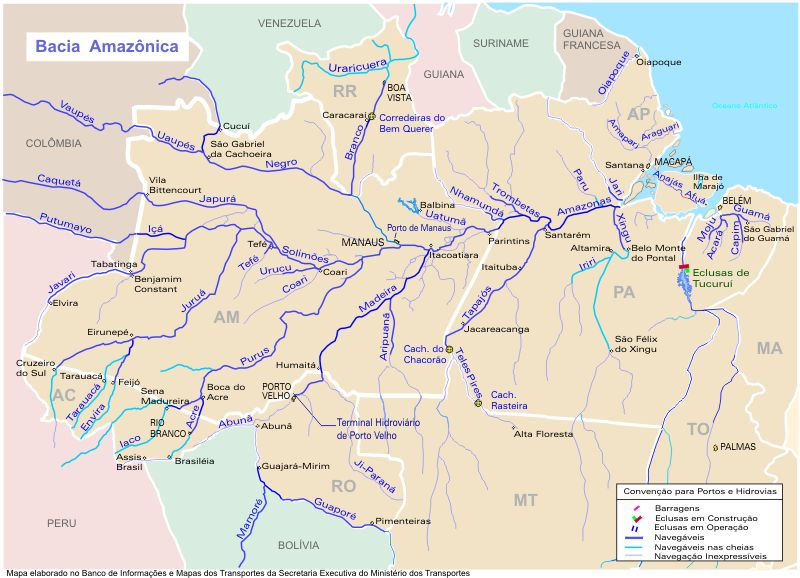
Political map of the Amazon River and its drainage basin

Jolkesky (2016) speculates that from around 2,200 B.C. to 1,800 B.C., the banks of the Amazon River had been occupied by a continuous chain of language families. They are listed below in order, beginning from the mouth of the Amazon River to the upper Amazon and Marañón Rivers.

1. Pre-Proto-Cariban (from the Xingu to Tapajós confluence)
2. Pre-Proto-Nambikwaran (Tapajós confluence)
3. Pre-Proto-Peba-Yagua (Madeira confluence)
4. Pre-Proto-Kwaza (Madeira confluence)
5. Pre-Proto-Puinave-Nadahup (Lower Madeira River)
6. Pre-Proto-Jivaroan (Rio Negro confluence)
7. Pre-Proto-Yanomami (along the Lower Rio Negro)
8. Pre-Proto-Arawan (Purus confluence)
9. Pre-Proto-Harakmbut-Katukinan (Tefé confluence)
10. Pre-Proto-Bora-Muinane (Japurá, Jutaí, Juruá confluences)
11. Proto-Pano-Takanan (Içá and Jutaí confluences)
12. Pre-Proto-Witotoan (upper Amazon River)
13. Pre-Proto-Zaparoan (Napo confluence)
14. Pre-Proto-Urarina (Ucayali and Marañón confluence)
15. Pre-Proto-Cahuapanan (Huallaga and Marañón confluences)

Urheimat of other language families:

- Pre-Proto-Chibchan: Lower Magdalena River Valley
- Pre-Proto-Warao: Orinoco Delta
- Proto-Duho: Upper Inírida, Upper Vaupés, and Upper Apaporis basins
- Pre-Proto-Tukanoan: Andean foothills and Upper Caquetá basin
- Pre-Proto-Barbacoan: Ecuadorian Andes
- Pre-Proto-Mochica: Daule River basin
- Pre-Proto-Cholon-Hibito: Upper Santiago and Upano basins
- Pre-Proto-Macro-Arawakan: Middle and Upper Ucayali basins
- Pre-Proto-Candoshi-Shapra: Upper Huallaga basin in the Peruvian Highlands
- Pre-Proto-Quechuan: Lake Junín region
- Pre-Proto-Jaqi: middle Mantaro basin in the Peruvian Highlands
- Pre-Proto-Mapudungun: coast of southern Peru
- Pre-Proto-Kunza: sources of the Urubamba and Apurimac Rivers
- Pre-Proto-Uru-Chipaya: shores of Lake Titicaca
- Proto-Tupian: Roosevelt and Upper Aripuanã basins
- Proto-Macro-Jê : Mato Grosso, from the São Lourenço River to the Rio das Mortes
- Pre-Proto-Macro-Mataguayo-Guaykuru: Pantanal

== Classification ==
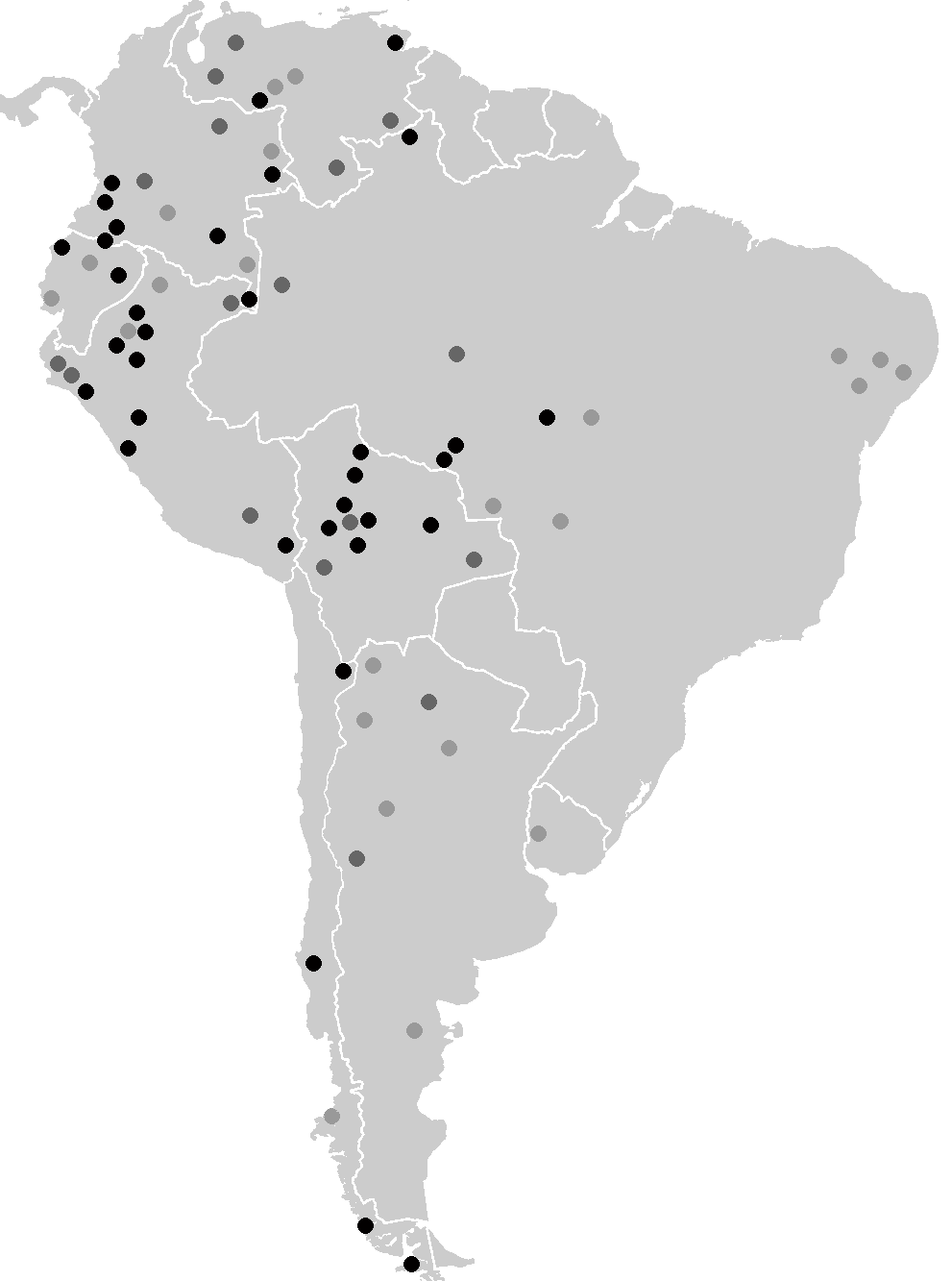
Language isolates of South America

Although some of the classifications are based on geographic, ethnographic, or cultural criteria, these methods are not valid from a linguistic point of view, even though on some occasions there are correlations between them and a genuine phylogenetic relationship. The previous correlation is supported only in branches or subgroups, but within the more extensive and diversified linguistic families, the correlation between cultural similarity and linguistic relationship is notably reduced, becoming random and arbitrary. Although families like Cariban languages or Tupian languages are formed by villages with typical cultures of the tropical jungle, there are villages that speak Tupian languages, like Aché and Sirionó, who have very different cultures from those of the tropical jungle. And equally, the villages of a homogeneous cultural area like the eastern slopes of the Andes in fact, belong to unrelated linguistic families. In the same manner, isolated languages, or less diversified families, tend to concentrate in marginal areas, while Quechua, that is a family of few languages not very diversified, occupies a very prominent place both from a historical and a demographic point of view.

=== Problems with the classification ===
The major part of the proper linguistic classification of the languages of South America has been done on the basis of vocabulary lists and some grammatical traits. That procedure, although it leads to the clear recognition of the top-level genetic groups, does not distinguish well between the coincidences and the lexical loans of the words retained from the common proto-language. Also the glottochronology, which is more criticizable to find relationships of higher levels, has been used extensively. Just recently the comparative method has been applied carefully and patiently to find relationships between the identifiable phylogenetic subgroups from a simple list of vocabulary. For that reason, the phylogenetic classifications of the languages of America are far from definitive, and the best of them, in the best of cases, are only an approximation of the real relationships. For that reason, many proposed families like Macro-Arawakan or Macro-Chibchan are questionable because evidence that exists in their favor is sporadic, debatable, and not very solid.

The number of dead languages with scarce records is also very high among the languages of South America. Those languages are frequently labeled as unclassified languages, when in reality they are unclassifiable because the recorded material relies on unverifiable philological interpretations and extremely scarce data with which it is not possible to establish a relationship unequivocally, as is the case with living languages for which data can be collected in sufficient numbers to decide if they are related to other languages or are genuine isolated languages.

Another important difficulty is the multiplicity of names used for South American languages. Many times the names reflect orthographic conventions of different European languages (Spanish, Portuguese, English) or simply the whim of each author when referring to a language among the names of tribes, dialects, or groups related to that language. There are cases of fictional languages that appear in the classifications, when in fact it is an alternative denomination for another language; in other cases, it is not possible to decide if two different names represent two different languages or close dialects of the same language. And vice versa, sometimes the same name has been used to refer to unrelated languages; for example, the term "catuquina" can refer to a family of languages, to Katukinan language, a particular language of the catuquina family, or another language of the Pano-Tacanan family, even Catuquinarú language seems to have been a group that spoke a Tupian language. Similarly, the terms "tapuya", a Tupian term for "enemy", has been applied to many unrelated languages. The lack of orthographic standardization and the multiplicity of names for the same language sometimes make it difficult to compare among classifications of different authors.

=== Important classifications ===
The first well-founded classification that used proper linguistic data is that of the American anthropologist D. G. Brinton (1891), which recognized 73 families on the basis of grammatical similarities and a brief list of vocabulary. In 1913, another anthropologist, Alexander Chamberlain, published a very influential classification that for many years was considered as a basic reference, although that classification did not provide enough details about its foundation. The classification of the French anthropologist Paul Rivet (1924) far surpassed all previous ones, providing a large amount of linguistic data and evidence that had been unpublished until then; that classification recognized 77 families and was based on lexical similarities. The Czech American Čestmír Loukotka contributed two more classifications (1935, 1944). Along the lines of Rivet, the first one extended the number of families to 94, and the second revised the previous one and recognized 114 families. The largest number of families in Loukotka's classifications was due to the discovery of new languages, and because he separated some of the more uncertain groups in Rivet's classification into different families. Rivet and Loukotka worked together on a new classification (1952) that proposed 108 families. During much of the second half of the 20th century, the reference classification was a later revision of Loukotka (1968) that set the number of families to 117.

Other existing classifications are those of Joseph Greenberg (1956), revised later (1987), Morris Swadesh's (1964) and one by Jorge Suárez(1973). These propose a reduction in the number of subgroups and, at least the first two authors, accept the Amerind hypothesis; that ultimately all of the families of America (except Eskimo-Aleut and Na-Dene) are related. These classifications have been criticized by most Americanists, who prefer the more conservative and less certain classifications, even if they do include a large number of families. More recently, Terrence Kaufman (1994) and Lyle Campbell (1997) have proposed their own classifications, the first one more in line with Greenberg and Swadesh ("mergers") and the second more in line with Loukotka ("splitters").

== Languages by geographic region ==
Below is a list of South American language families and isolates grouped by geographic region. The inventory of language families and isolates is partly based on Campbell (2024). Each region is highlighted in bold, while language isolates and individual languages are highlighted in italics.

- Arawakan
- Cariban
- Tupian
- Macro-Jê
  - Jê
  - Jabutian
  - Kamakã
  - Krenakan
  - Maxakalian
  - Jaikó
  - Karajá
  - Ofayé
  - Rikbaktsá
- **Eastern Brazil**
  - Karirian
  - Chiquitano
  - Guató
  - Purí–Coroado
  - Taruma
  - Xukurú
  - Yaté
- **Orinoco (Venezuela)**
  - Otomacoan
  - Sáliban
  - Ticuna–Yuri
  - Yanomaman
  - Arutani
  - Betoi-Jirara
  - Guamo
  - Hodï
  - Máku (Jukude)
  - Sapé
  - Warao
  - Yaruro
- **Andes (Colombia and Venezuela)**
  - Jirajaran
  - Paezan
  - Tiniguan
  - Timotean
  - Cofán
  - Camsá
  - Andaquí
- **Amazon (Colombia, Japurá–Vaupés area)**
  - Andoque–Urequena
  - Boran
  - Guajiboan
  - Nadahup
  - Kakwa-Nukak
  - Tucanoan
  - Witotoan
  - Puinave
- **Pacific coast (Colombia and Ecuador)**
  - Chibchan
  - Chocoan
  - Barbacoan
  - Yurumanguí
  - Esmeralda
- **Pacific coast (Peru)**
  - Cañari–Puruhá
  - Mochica
  - Sechura
  - Tallán
- **Amazon (Peru)**
  - Hibito–Cholon
  - Cahuapanan
  - Chicham
  - Pano–Tacanan
  - Peba–Yagua
  - Zaparoan
  - Candoshi
  - Munichi
  - Omurano
  - Taushiro
  - Tequiraca
  - Urarina
  - Waorani
- **Amazon (Amazonas and Mato Grosso)**
  - Arawan
  - Harákmbut–Katukinan
  - Muran
  - Matanawí
  - Trumai
- **Mamoré–Guaporé**
  - Bororoan
  - Chapacuran
  - Mosetenan
  - Nambikwaran
  - Aikanã
  - Arara do Rio Branco
  - Canichana
  - Cayuvava
  - Itonama
  - Irantxe
  - Kanoê
  - Kwazá
  - Leco
  - Movima
  - Yuracaré
- **Andes (Peru, Bolivia, and Chile)**
  - Araucanian
  - Aymaran
  - Quechuan
  - Uru–Chipaya
  - Culle
  - Puquina
  - Kunza
- **Chaco–Pampas**
  - Charruan
  - Chonan
  - Guaicuruan
  - Huarpean
  - Lule–Vilelan
  - Matacoan
  - Mascoyan
  - Zamucoan
  - Guachí
  - Payaguá
- **Far South**
  - Qawasqaran
  - Yaghan
  - Chono

== Linguistic areas ==
There are at least two large areas with clearly different characteristics separated by a transition zone; these are the Andean and the Amazon area. Although there are more frequent features in each of these areas, the two areas harbor a great linguistic diversity, the differences being basically in the frequency with which certain features appear in each of them.

Below are historical linguistic spheres of influence in South America as listed by Jolkesky (2016):

Sphere of interaction	Dates
Caquetá-Japurá	1000 BC – 400 AD
Caquetá-Negro	1 AD – 1700 AD
circum-Marañón	1500 BC – 1600 AD
circum-Titicaca	1500 BC – 1600 AD
Central Amazon	2000 BC – 1700 AD
San Agustín	1 AD – 1600 AD
Upper Amazon	600 BC – 1600 AD
Lower Amazon	2000 BC – 1600 AD
Lower/Middle Paraguay	500 BC – 1600 AD
Middle Orinoco	400 AD – 1600 AD
Pantanal of Guaporé	500 AD – 1600 AD
Central Brazil	1500 BC – 1700 AD
Ucayali	200 AD – 1600 AD
Central Andes	1500 BC – 1500 AD
Negro-Orinoco	800 AD – 1700 AD
nuclear/intermediate South American area	1500 BC – 1500 AD
Putumayo-Caquetá	1 AD – 1700 AD
Central Trans-Andes	500 BC – 600 AD
Southern Trans-Andes	1500 BC – 1600 AD

Language families in South America have had extensive contact with other over millennia. Jolkesky (2016) has found lexical parallels among the following language families, most of which are due to borrowing and contact rather than inheritance:

Language family	Other language families with lexical parallels
Aikanã	Kanoe, Kwaza, Nambikwara
Andaki	Paez, Chibcha, Tinigua-Pamigua
Andoke-Urekena	Saliba-Hodi, Tikuna-Yuri
Arawa	Chapakura-Wañam, Jivaro, Kwaza, Máku, Mura-Matanawi, Taruma, Yanomami, Arawak, Nadahup, Puinave-Kak, Tupi
Arawak	Arawa, Bora-Muinane, Guahibo, Harakmbet-Katukina, Harakmbet, Katukina-Katawixi, Irantxe, Jaqi, Karib, Kawapana, Kayuvava, Kechua, Kwaza, Leko, Macro-Jê, Macro-Mataguayo-Guaykuru, Mapudungun, Mochika, Mura-Matanawi, Nambikwara, Omurano, Pano-Takana, Pano, Takana, Puinave-Nadahup, Taruma, Tupi, Urarina, Witoto-Okaina, Yaruro, Zaparo, Saliba-Hodi, Tikuna-Yuri
Arutani	Máku, Sape, Warao, Tikuna-Yuri, Tukano
Atakame	Barbakoa
Barbakoa	Atakame, Cholon-Hibito, Kechua, Mochika, Paez, Tukano, Umbra, Chibcha
Bora-Muinane	Choko, Guahibo, Tukano, Witoto-Okaina, Yaruro, Arawak, Tupi
Bororo	Guato, Karib, Kayuvava, Nambikwara, Tupi
Chapakura-Wañam	Irantxe, Puinave-Kak, Arawa
Chibcha	Andaki, Barbakoa, Choko, Duho, Paez, Sape, Taruma
Choko	Guahibo, Kamsa, Paez, Tukano, Umbra, Witoto-Okaina, Yaruro, Chibcha, Bora-Muinane
Cholon-Hibito	Kechua, Leko, Mapudungun, Mochika, Kandoshi, Muniche, Barbakoa
Duho	Chibcha
Guahibo	Yanomami, Arawak, Nadahup, Puinave-Kak, Bora-Muinane, Choko
Guato	Bororo, Tupi, Karib
Harakmbet	Pano, Puinave-Nadahup, Tupi, Arawak
Harakmbet-Katukina	Arawak
Irantxe	Arawak, Tupi, Chapakura-Wañam, Nambikwara, Yanomami
Itonama	Nambikwara
Jaqi	Kechua, Kunza, Leko, Uru-Chipaya, Arawak, Pukina
Jeoromitxi	Karib, Kwaza, Mura-Matanawi, Taruma
Jirajara	Sape, Timote-Kuika, Puinave-Kak
Jivaro	Kechua, Kwaza, Taruma, Yanomami, Katukina-Katawixi, Kandoshi, Tupi, Arawa
Kamsa	Choko
Kandoshi	Cholon-Hibito, Jivaro, Kawapana, Kechua, Kunza, Mochika, Pano
Kanichana	Mochika
Kanoe	Kwaza, Nambikwara, Aikanã
Karaja	Karib, Puinave-Nadahup, Tupi
Karib	Guato, Kawapana, Nambikwara, Taruma, Warao, Arawak, Bororo, Jeoromitxi, Karaja, Rikbaktsa, Tupi
Katukina-Katawixi	Jivaro, Máku, Mura-Matanawi, Puinave-Nadahup, Taruma, Tupi, Yanomami, Arawak
Kawapana	Kechua, Arawak, Kandoshi, Pukina, Karib
Kayuvava	Arawak, Bororo, Takana, Tupi
Kechua	Kunza, Leko, Mapudungun, Mochika, Uru-Chipaya, Zaparo, Arawak, Kandoshi, Muniche, Pukina, Pano, Barbakoa, Cholon-Hibito, Jaqi, Jivaro, Kawapana
Kofan	Paez
Kulle	Leko
Kunza	Mochika, Kandoshi, Jaqi, Kechua, Mapudungun, Uru-Chipaya
Kwaza	Taruma, Arawak, Jeoromitxi, Arawa, Jivaro, Mura-Matanawi, Nambikwara, Peba-Yagua, Aikanã, Kanoe
Leko	Kulle, Omurano, Taushiro, Urarina, Arawak, Cholon-Hibito, Jaqi, Kechua
Macro-Jê	Arawak
Macro-Mataguayo-Guaykuru	Trumai, Tupi, Arawak, Ofaye
Máku	Sape, Warao, Saliba-Hodi, Tikuna-Yuri, Katukina-Katawixi, Arawa, Arutani
Mapudungun	Kunza, Mochika, Uru-Chipaya, Arawak, Pano, Cholon-Hibito, Kechua
Mochika	Trumai, Arawak, Kandoshi, Muniche, Barbakoa, Cholon-Hibito, Kechua, Mapudungun, Kanichana, Kunza
Moseten-Tsimane	Uru-Chipaya, Yurakare, Pano
Muniche	Cholon-Hibito, Kechua, Mochika
Mura-Matanawi	Kwaza, Taruma, Katukina-Katawixi, Arawak, Jeoromitxi, Tupi, Arawa
Nadahup	Arawa, Guahibo, Tupi
Nambikwara	Aikanã, Irantxe, Itonama, Kanoe, Kwaza, Peba-Yagua, Arawak, Bororo, Karib
Ofaye	Macro-Mataguayo-Guaykuru
Omurano	Urarina, Arawak, Zaparo, Leko
Paez	Chibcha, Barbakoa, Choko, Tukano, Andaki, Kofan
Pano	Kechua, Mapudungun, Moseten-Tsimane, Tukano, Uru-Chipaya, Harakmbet, Arawak, Kandoshi, Pukina
Pano-Takana	Arawak
Peba-Yagua	Kwaza, Zaparo, Nambikwara
Pijao	Witoto-Okaina
Puinave-Kak	Arawa, Chapakura-Wañam, Guahibo, Jirajara, Sape, Tupi, Yanomami
Puinave-Nadahup	Harakmbet, Katukina-Katawixi, Arawak, Karaja
Pukina	Jaqi, Kawapana, Kechua, Pano, Uru-Chipaya
Rikbaktsa	Karib
Saliba-Hodi	Andoke-Urekena, Arawak, Máku, Tukano, Yaruro
Sape	Warao, Chibcha, Puinave-Kak, Jirajara, Tukano, Arutani, Máku
Takana	Kayuvava, Tupi, Arawak
Taruma	Chibcha, Katukina-Katawixi, Arawak, Jeoromitxi, Tupi, Arawa, Jivaro, Karib, Mura-Matanawi, Tukano, Yanomami, Kwaza
Taushiro	Tekiraka, Leko
Tekiraka	Taushiro
Tikuna-Yuri	Andoke-Urekena, Arawak, Arutani, Máku, Tukano
Timote-Kuika	Jirajara
Tinigua-Pamigua	Andaki
Trumai	Macro-Mataguayo-Guaykuru, Tupi, Mochika
Tukano	Arutani, Paez, Sape, Taruma, Witoto-Okaina, Saliba-Hodi, Tikuna-Yuri, Pano, Barbakoa, Bora-Muinane, Choko
Tupi	Arawa, Bora-Muinane, Guato, Irantxe, Jivaro, Karib, Kayuvava, Mura-Matanawi, Taruma, Trumai, Yanomami, Harakmbet, Katukina-Katawixi, Arawak, Bororo, Karaja, Macro-Mataguayo-Guaykuru, Takana, Nadahup, Puinave-Kak
Umbra	Barbakoa, Choko
Urarina	Arawak, Leko, Omurano
Uru-Chipaya	Kunza, Pukina, Pano, Jaqi, Kechua, Mapudungun, Moseten-Tsimane
Waorani	Yaruro
Warao	Karib, Arutani, Máku, Sape
Witoto-Okaina	Pijao, Yaruro, Arawak, Bora-Muinane, Choko, Tukano
Yanomami	Irantxe, Taruma, Katukina-Katawixi, Puinave-Kak, Tupi, Arawa, Guahibo, Jivaro
Yaruro	Saliba-Hodi, Arawak, Bora-Muinane, Choko, Witoto-Okaina, Waorani
Yurakare	Moseten-Tsimane
Zaparo	Omurano, Arawak, Kechua, Peba-Yagua

== Linguistic characteristics ==
The languages of South America are enormously diverse. There are no common characteristics to all of them since they belong to different linguistic families, and as a whole do not form a linguistic area where there has been convergence to certain common features. The more frequent common characteristics are similar to those found in the rest of the world, so there are no peculiarities of the languages of South America.

=== Grammar ===
As is the case worldwide, the majority of South American languages, such as Andean languages and Bora–Witoto languages, predominantly use suffixes. It is also common to find agglutinative languages that use many suffixes and a few prefixes, as is the case with Arawakan and Pano-Tacanan languages. Some language families use prefixes and suffixes, but only a few per word as in Cariban, Tupian, and Macro-Jê (it has been proposed that these three families could form a Je-Tupi-Carib superfamily). A few languages extensively use prefixes and even more suffixes, like Hibito–Cholon languages. No languages have been found that use prefixes exclusively to mark grammatical relations. Isolating languages, which practically lack affixes, such as Selkʼnam and Tehuelche, are quite rare in South America.

The morphological complexity of words varies enormously; in Guarani (Tupian), the average is three morphemes, while in Piro (Arawakan), it is six morphemes. In Yuracaré, many words are formed by reduplication, a procedure also used systematically in Tupian languages. The composition is very frequent, just like in the rest of the world, although it is a rare procedure in Chonan languages that are highly isolating. Nominal incorporation in the verb is also frequent in America. As for the classical morphological types, among the agglutinating languages, Quechua, Pano-Tacanan languages, or Mapuche are found. Cariban and Tupian languages are slightly fusional, and Chon languages are the clearest case of isolating languages.

Guaicuru languages (Mataco–Guaicuru) have a grammatical gender distinction in the noun, although other languages have special morphemes to differentiate masculine and feminine in the markings of a person of the verb (Arawakan, Witoto, Tucanoan). Languages without a grammatical gender distinction are the most numerous, just like in the rest of the world. Regarding grammatical number, distinction between singular and plural is optional in the third person of many Cariban and Tupian languages, whereas Mapuche and Yaghan obligatorily distinguish the singular from the dual and the plural. Grammatical case is usually indicated by suffixes or post-positions more often than with prepositions. Nominal classifiers that classify nouns according to the shape of the object or the way they appear naturally are frequent in Chibchan, Tucanoan, and Yanomaman languages. It is also common in some languages (Guaicuru, Mataco, Cocama) for some words to have different forms if the speaker is male or female.

In personal pronouns, the distinction of clusivity in the first person of the plural form is used frequently. It is also common to mark, in the third person, if the referent is present or absent, sitting or standing, and other distinct incidental similarities (Movima, Guaicuru). Possession is indicated by prefixes or suffixes. The systems that mark possession of the noun coincide with the markings of subject of the intransitive verbs quite frequently.

On the verb, it is common to mark both the person of the subject, the person of the object, and the negation within the same verbal form. Grammatical aspect and grammatical tense are recorded in virtually all languages, although its realization varies greatly from one language to others: in Aguaruna, there is a future verb form, along with three past verb forms that differ according to the relative distance in time, while Guarani differentiates future forms from non-future forms. Other languages, like Jébero, basically express the grammatical mood, making the other verbal categories less important. It is also very common to use directionals or affixes that indicate movement with respect to the speaker, or the listener, or the location in the verbal action (Quechua, Záparo, Itonama). Other affixes that are given are "manners" of how the action is carried out (hitting, biting, walking, ...); these appear in Jébero or Ticuna. Cariban languages also indicate whether an action was carried out collectively or individually. For the grammatical modifier, the use of equations is frequent, formed by the simple juxtaposition of subject, features that are common in many languages. This contrasts with European languages that frequently use linking verbs in this type of predication.

=== Phonology ===
As with grammar, there are no characteristics common to the languages of South America. There is a lot of variation in the number of phonemes: in Jaqaru (Aymaran), 42 segmental phonemes are distinguished, while in Campa (Arawakan), only 17 are distinguished. Jaqaru has 36 consonants, while Makusi (Cariban) has only 11. Some Quechua varieties have only three vowels, while Apinayé (Jê) has ten oral vowels and seven nasal vowels.

A dialect of Tucanoan distinguishes only three points of articulation, while Uru–Chipaya distinguishes nine points of articulation. The voiceless stops /p, t, k/ appear in virtually all languages, while the corresponding sounds /b, d, g/ are frequently absent, and fricatives like /f, v, z/ may most often be missing. Glottalized stops appear in Andean and Chibchan languages. Aspirated stops are used in Quechua and Aymaran languages, but in general they are rare. Also, palatalized consonants as in the Puinave language are not very frequent. A contrast between velars and post-velars is used in Quechua, Aymaran, and Chonan, while velars and labiovelars are contrasted in Tacana and Siona. Retroflex consonants are somewhat rare, although they appear in Pano-Tacanan and Uru-Chipaya languages.

Vowel systems with nasal vowels are frequent (Macro-Jê and Saliban), but in many languages nasality is not a property of the vowel; instead it is a suprasegmental phoneme of the word (Tupian and Yanomaman). Front rounded vowels (⟨ö⟩ [ø], ⟨ü⟩ [y]) are virtually absent, although central vowels are common (⟨ï⟩ [ɨ]), as are back unrounded vowels (⟨ï⟩ [ɯ]). Long and short vowels are contrasted in the Cariban and Uru–Chipaya families. Glottalized vowels appear in Tikuna and the Chonan family. Tone and pitch accent are very common in South America. In any case, the tonal languages of South America have simple systems; the most complex systems are those of Acaricuara (three tones), Mundukurú (four tones), and Ticuna (five tones).

== Languages by country ==
Number of living indigenous languages by country as of 2012, as reported by Crevels (2012):

Country	Total population	Indigenous population	Indigenous languages
Brazil	198,739,300	358,000	177
Colombia	45,644,000	1,392,600	68
Peru	29,547,000	4,045,700	50
Venezuela	26,814,800	536,900	36
Bolivia	9,827,500	4,541,000	33
Paraguay	6,995,700	103,300	18
Argentina	40,913,600	600,300	15
Ecuador	14,573,100	830,400	13
Guyana	772,300	50,000	10
Suriname	481,300	7,000	8
French Guiana	221,500	5,000	7
Chile	16,601,700	692,200	6
Total	391,131,800	13,162,400	420

See also:

- Indigenous languages of Argentina
- Indigenous languages of Bolivia
- Indigenous languages of Brazil
- Indigenous languages of Colombia
- Indigenous languages of Chile
- Indigenous languages of Ecuador
- Indigenous languages of Paraguay
- Indigenous languages of Peru
- Indigenous languages of Venezuela
- Indigenous languages of Guyana
- Indigenous languages of Suriname
- Indigenous languages of French Guiana

== See also ==
- Languages of South America
  - List of indigenous languages of South America
    - Amazonian languages
    - List of unclassified languages of South America
    - List of extinct languages of South America
      - Extinct languages of the Marañón River basin
- Indigenous languages of the Americas
  - Classification of indigenous languages of the Americas
- List of indigenous peoples of South America
  - List of indigenous peoples of Brazil
- Handbook of South American Indians

== Bibliography ==
- Adelaar, Willem (2004). The Languages of the Andes. Cambridge University Press. ISBN 978-0-521-36275-7.
- Campbell, Lyle. (1997). American Indian languages: The historical linguistics of Native America. New York: Oxford University Press. ISBN 0-19-509427-1.
- Dixon & Alexandra Y. Aikhenvald (eds.), The Amazonian languages. Cambridge: Cambridge University Press, 1999. ISBN 0-521-57021-2.
- Gordon, Raymond G., Jr. (Ed.). (2005). Ethnologue: Languages of the world (15th ed.). Dallas, TX: SIL International. ISBN 1-55671-159-X. (Online version: http://www.ethnologue.com).
- Greenberg, Joseph H. (1987) Language in the Americas. Stanford University Press, CA.- ISBN 0-8047-1315-4
- Kaufman, Terrence. (1990). Language history in South America: What we know and how to know more. In D. L. Payne (Ed.), Amazonian linguistics: Studies in lowland South American languages (pp. 13–67). Austin: University of Texas Press. ISBN 0-292-70414-3.
- Kaufman, Terrence. (1994). The native languages of South America. In C. Mosley & R. E. Asher (Eds.), Atlas of the world's languages (pp. 46–76). London: Routledge.
- Key, Mary R. (1979). The grouping of South American languages. Tübingen: Gunter Narr Verlag.
- Loukotka, Čestmír. (1968). Classification of South American Indian languages. Los Angeles: Latin American Studies Center, University of California.
- Mason, J. Alden. (1950). The languages of South America. In J. Steward (Ed.), Handbook of South American Indians (Vol. 6, pp. 157–317). Smithsonian Institution Bureau of American Ethnology bulletin (No. 143). Washington, D.C.: Government Printing Office.
- Michael, Lev; Chousou-Polydouri, Natalia (2020). "Computational phylogenetics and the classification of South American languages" (PDF). Language and Linguistics Compass. 13 (12) e12358. doi:10.1111/lnc3.12358. S2CID 210985305.
- Migliazza, Ernest C.; & Campbell, Lyle. (1988). Panorama general de las lenguas indígenas en América. Historia general de América (Vol. 10). Caracas: Instituto Panamericano de Geografía e Historia.
- Poser, William J. (1992) The Salinan and Yurumanguí Data in Language in the Americas. International Journal of American Linguistics 58.2.202-22.PDF
- Rowe, John H. (1954). Linguistics classification problems in South America. In M. B. Emeneau (Ed.), Papers from the symposium on American Indian linguistics (pp. 10–26). University of California publications in linguistics (Vol. 10). Berkeley: University of California Press.
- Tax, Sol. (1960) "Aboriginal languages of Latin America"; Current Anthropology 1: 430-436.
- Tovar, Antonio, y Larrucea de Tovar, C.: Catálogo de las Lenguas de América del Sur (1986). Con clasificaciones, indicaciones tipológicas, bibliografía y mapas. Ed. Gredos, Madrid. Col. Grandes Manuales.
- Voegelin, Carl F.; & Voegelin, Florence M. (1965). Classification of American Indian languages. Languages of the world, Native American fasc. 2, sec. 1.6). Anthropological Linguistics, 7 (7): 121-150.
- Voegelin, Carl F.; & Voegelin, Florence M. (1977). Classification and index of the world's languages. Amsterdam: Elsevier. ISBN 0-444-00155-7.

=== Lexicons ===
- Anonymous. (1928). Lenguas de América. Manuscripts de la Real Biblioteca. Vol. 1 (Catálogo de la Real Biblioteca, VI). Madrid.
- Crevels, M.; Muysken, P. (eds.). Lenguas de Bolivia. La Paz: Plural editores.
- de Matallana, B.; de Armellada, C. (1943). Exploración del Paragua. Boletín de la Sociedad Venezolana de ciencias naturales, 8:61-110.
- Farabee, W. C. (1922). Indian Tribes of Eastern Peru. (Papers of the Peabody Museum of American Archaeology and Ethnology, Harvard University, 10.). Massachusetts: Peabody Museum.
- González de Pérez, M. S.; Rodríguez de Montes, M. L. (eds.) (2000). Lenguas indígenas de Colombia: una visión descriptiva. Santafé de Bogotá: Instituto Caro y Cuervo.
- Huber, R. Q.; Reed, R. B. (1992). Vocabulario Comparativo: Palabras Selectas de Lenguas Indígenas de Colombia. Santafé de Bogotá: SIL.
- Jahn, A. (1927). Los Aborígenes del Occidente de Venezuela: Su Historia, Etnografía y Afinidades Lingüísticos. Caracas: Lit. y Tip. del Comerio.
- Jijón Y Caamaño, J. (1945). Antropología prehispánica del Ecuador. Quito: La prensa catolica.
- Key, M. R.; Comrie, B. (eds.) (2015). The Intercontinental Dictionary Series. Leipzig: Max Planck Institute for Evolutionary Anthropology.
- Koch-Grünberg, Th. (1928). Von Roraima zum Orinoco. Ergebnisse einer Reise in Nord-Brasilien und Venezuela in den Jahren 1911-1913. Stuttgart: Strecker und Schröder.
- Landaburu, J. (ed.) (1996). Documentos sobre lenguas aborígenes de Colombia del archivo de Paul Rivet (4 volumes). Bogotá: Ediciones Uniandes/ CCELA/ COLCIENCIAS.
- Lehmann, W. (1920). Zentral-Amerika. Teil I. Die Sprachen Zentral-Amerikas in ihren Beziehungen zueinander sowie zu Süd-Amerika und Mexico. Berlin: Reimer.
- Loukotka, C. (1942). Klassifikation der Südamerikanischen Sprachen. Zeitschrift für Ethnologie, 74.1-6:1-69.
- Montaño Aragón, M. (1987): Guía Etnográfica Lingüística de Bolivia, La Paz: Editorial Don Bosco.
- Natterer, J. (n.d.) Collections of vocabularies. (Manuscript).
- Nies, J. (1976). Suplemento A: listas comparativas de palabras usuales en idiomas vernaculos de la selva (Datos Etno-Lingüísticos, 49). Lima: Summer Institute of Linguistics.
- Nimuendajú, K. (1925). As Tribus do Alto Madeira. Journal de la Société des Américanistes, 17:137-172.
- Nimuendajú, K. (1932a). Idiomas Indígenas del Brasil. Revista del Instituto de etnología de la Universidad nacional de Tucumán, 2:543-618.
- Nimuendajú, K. (1932b). Wortlisten aus Amazonien. Journal de la Société des Américanistes de Paris, 24:93-119.
- Nimuendajú, K.; Do Valle Bentes, E. H. (1923). Documents sur quelques langues peu connues de l'Amazone. Journal de la Société des Américanistes, 15:215-222.
- Payne, D. L. (1990). Some widespread grammatical forms in South American languages. In: D. L. Payne (ed.), Amazonian linguistics: Studies in lowland South American languages, 75-87. Austin: University of Texas Press.
- Torero, A. (2002). Idiomas de los Andes: Lingüística e Historia. Lima: Editorial Horizonte.
- Von Martius, C. F. Ph. (1867). Wörtersammlung Brasilianischer Sprachen. (Beiträge zur Ethnographie und Sprachenkunde Amerikas zumal Brasiliens, II.) Leipzig: Friedrich Fleischer.
- Zevallos Quiñones, J. (1948). Primitivas Lenguas de la Costa. Revista del Museo Nacional de Lima, 17:114-119.
