= Huachipaeri =

Huachipaeri or Wacipairi may refer to:

- Huachipaeri people, an ethnic group of Peru
- Huachipaeri language, a language of Peru
