= Sapiteri =

Sapiteri may refer to:

- Sapiteri people, an ethnic group of Peru
- Sapiteri language, a language of Peru
