= Toyeri =

Toyeri may refer to:

- Toyeri people, an ethnic group of Peru
- Toyeri language, a language of Peru
