= Guató language =

Language

Guató
- go-t͡ʃéuvɨ́ i-ótɨ́
- Pronunciation: [go-t͡ʃéuvɨ́ i-ótɨ́]
- Native to: Brazil, Bolivia
- Region: Mato Grosso do Sul state: Paraguay River banks and up São Lourenço River, along Bolivian border; also Santa Cruz Department (Bolivia): Uberaba Lake
- Ethnicity: 419 Guató people (2014)
- Extinct: 4 August 2026, with the death of Vicente Manoel da Silva (Djyguapo)
- Language family: Language isolate (Macro-Jê?)

Language codes
- ISO 639-3: gta
- Glottolog: guat1253
- ELP: Guató
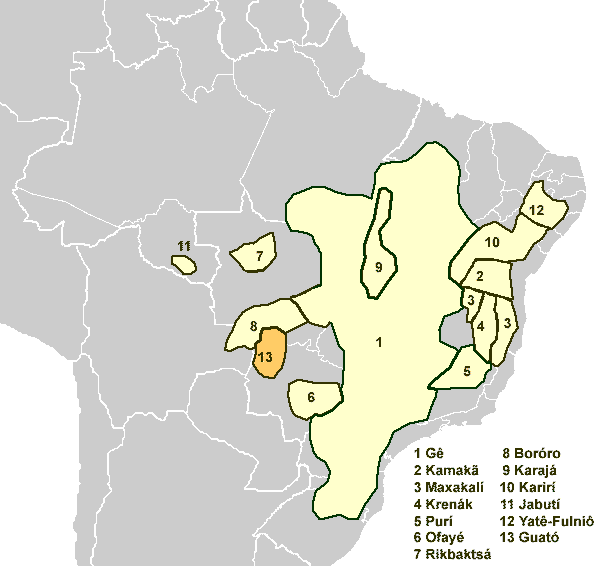

- Guató is classified as Critically Endangered by the UNESCO Atlas of the World's Languages in Danger.

Guató (Guató: go-t͡ʃéuvɨ́ i-ótɨ́) is a language isolate formerly spoken by the Guató people of Brazil. It has variously been claimed to be of Macro-Jê or isolate affiliation. Guató is a VSO language, has agglutination, and has ergative alignment.

== Classification ==
Terrence Kaufman (1990) provisionally classified Guató as a branch of the Macro-Jê languages, as did Aryon Rodrigues (1999) and Martins (2011), but no evidence for this was found by Eduardo Ribeiro and Hein van der Voort (2010). Andrey Nikulin (2020) excludes this possibility.

== History ==
=== Documentation ===
The Guató language is first documented in a number of wordlists, beginning with François-Louis Laporte, comte de Castelnau's 1851 publication, and followed by others through 1959. The only substantial grammar of Guató was written by Adair Pimentel Palácio and published in 1984.

=== Language contact ===
Marcelo Jolkesky (2016) identifies lexical similarities with the Bororo, Tupi, and Karib language families, which, according to him, are due to contact.

== Geographical distribution ==
Today, the Guató mainly reside in Guató Indigenous Territory and Baía dos Guató Indigenous Territory. All residents speak only Portuguese, and the two remaining speakers live elsewhere.

Loukotka (1968) reported that as of 1964, in Mato Grosso do Sul, Brazil, Guató was spoken on the banks of the Paraguay River and up the São Lourenço River, along the Bolivian border. It was also spoken at Uberaba Lake in Santa Cruz Department, Bolivia.

== Phonology ==
=== Vowels ===
The Guató vowel system, like that of the Macro-Jê languages, collapses a three-way distinction of height in oral vowels to two in nasal vowels. Eight oral and five nasal vowels are present in Guató.

	Oral			Nasal		
	Front	Central	Back	Front	Central	Back
Close	i	ɨ	u	ĩ	ɨ̃	ũ
Mid	e		o			
Open-mid	ɛ		ɔ	ɛ̃		
Open		a			ã	

=== Consonants ===
17 consonants are present in the language.

		Labial	Denti- alveolar	Post- alveolar	Velar	Labio- velar	Glottal
Plosive	voiceless	p	t		k	kʷ	
Plosive	voiced	b	d		ɡ	ɡʷ	
Affricate	voiceless			tʃ			
Affricate	voiced			dʒ			
Fricative	voiceless	f					h
Fricative	voiced	v					
Nasal		m	n				
Vibrant			ɾ				
Glide				j			

=== Tone ===
Guató is a tonal language, possessing a high and low tone.

== Morphology ==
Typologically, Guató is agglutinative, and has ergative alignment.

== Syntax ==
Guató is a VSO language.

== Vocabulary ==
For more extensive vocabulary lists of Guató by Palácio (1984) and Postigo (2009), see the corresponding Portuguese article.

=== Numerals ===
Guató uses a quinary (base-5) system up to 20, where a decimal system is used for large numbers.

=== Loanwords ===
A number of Portuguese loanwords are present in Guató:

Portuguese loanwords in Guató
gloss	Guató	Portuguese
papaya	omamõ	mamão
lemon	oɾimão	limão
cow	vaka	vaca
key	tʃave	chave
soldier, policeman	soɾodave	soldado

Loanwords undergo a phonetic adaptation in Guató.
