= Arutani language =

Near-extinct indigenous language of Brazil and Venezuela

Arutani
- Uruak, Awake
- Arutani
- Native to: Brazil, Venezuela
- Region: Roraima (Brazil); Karum River area, Bolivar State (Venezuela)
- Ethnicity: 20 Auaké
- Native speakers: 5–6 (2020)
- Language family: Language isolate
- Dialects: Awaké; Arutani

Language codes
- ISO 639-3: atx
- Glottolog: arut1244
- ELP: Arutani
- Arutani is classified as Critically Endangered by the UNESCO Atlas of the World's Languages in Danger

Arutani (Orotani, Urutani, also known as Awake, Auake, Auaqué, Aoaqui, Oewaku, Uruak) is a nearly extinct language spoken in Roraima, Brazil and in the Karum River area of Bolivar State, Venezuela. There are only five or six speakers left.

== Documentation ==
Arutani is one of the most poorly attested extant languages in South America. The language is documented solely in a 1911 word list collected by Theodor Koch-Grünberg (1928: 308-313), a 1940 word list by Armellada & Matallana (1942: 101-110), and a 100-item Swadesh list by Migliazza (1978). There is also an unpublished Swadesh list by Fèlix Cardona i Puig from the 1930s-1940s, as well as an unpublished 200-item Swadesh list by Walter Coppens from 1970.

== Classification ==
The language has been classified as a language isolate by most linguists. However, it has been grouped with neighbouring Sapé in a family termed the Arutani–Sape languages; this was first proposed by Morris Swadesh and Joseph Greenberg, but was expanded by Terrence Kaufman to include nearby Máku as well.

== Language contact ==
Marcelo Jolkesky (2016) identifies a number of similarities in vocabulary in Arutani with the Máku, Sape, Warao, Tikuna-Yuri, and Tukano language families. He ascribes these to language contact between them. For instance, lexical similarities in Arutani with Tucanoan languages are mostly cultural loanwords. The Arutani and Tucanoan languages also have completely different pronominal systems, and sound correspondences are irregular. Thus, similarities between them can be attributed to contact with Eastern Tucanoan.

== Geographic distribution ==
Čestmír Loukotka (1968) reports that it was previously spoken on the southern banks of Maracá Island in the Roraima, but later moved to the Uraricapara River near the Brazil–Venezuela border. Traditionally, Arutani was spoken along the Paragua River and Uraricaá River in southern Venezuela and the northern tip of Roraima, Brazil. The remaining speakers of Arutani are found in the following Ninam villages:

- Saúba (in Brazil): 1 speaker born in Venezuela who has family in Kavaimakén
- Kosoiba (in the Upper Paragua River valley of Venezuela): 3 speakers
- Kavaimakén (in the Upper Paragua River valley of Venezuela): 1 speaker
- Colibri (in the Upper Paragua River valley of Venezuela): 1 speaker reported

== Sociolinguistic situation ==
Ethnic Arutani also speak Ninam (Shirián), since they now mostly live in Ninam villages.

== Phonology ==
=== Consonants ===
	Labial	Alveolar	Post-alv./ Palatal	Velar	Glottal
Nasal	m	n			
Stop	p	t		k	
Affricate		ts			
Fricative		s	ʃ		h
Approximant			j	w	
Tap		ɾ			

- /ʃ/ has an allophone of [ʂ].
- [ɲ] is an allophone of /j/.
- [ɸ] is an allophone of /p/.

=== Vowels ===
	Front	Central	Back
Close	i		u
Mid	e		o
Open		a	

=== Stress ===
Stres in Arutani typically falls on the final syllable, though it has also been recorded on the penultimate syllable.

=== Tone ===
Arutani lacks lexical tone.

== Morphology ==
Arutani distinguishes inalienable and alienable possession, and has an instrumental/ergative case for nouns. It marks most grammatical categories via suffixes, enclitics, or particles at the end of clauses. However, person-marking on verbs and possessed nouns is expressed by prefixes instead.

== Syntax ==
The most common word order in Arutani is SV/AOV.
