= Sapé language =

Extinct language of Venezuela

Sapé
- Kaliana
- Sapé
- Pronunciation: [sapé]
- Native to: Venezuela
- Region: Paragua and Karuna rivers
- Ethnicity: 9 (2011 census)
- Extinct: November 2018, with the death of Ramón Quimillo Lezama; 2 semispeakers (2019)
- Language family: Arutani–Sape ?: Sapé

Language codes
- ISO 639-3: spc
- Glottolog: sape1238
- ELP: Sapé
- Sapé is classified as Critically Endangered by the UNESCO Atlas of the World's Languages in Danger.

Sapé, also called Kaliana or Caliana, is an extinct language recently spoken along the Paragua River and Karuna River. There were only about a few dozen speakers in the mid-1900s, and by the 2000s, only a few elderly speakers were found. Sapé may be a language isolate.

== Documentation ==
Sape is one of the most poorly attested extant languages in South America, and there is no comprehensive linguistic description of the language other than scattered word lists.

Word lists have been collected by Armellada & Matallana (1942), Migliazza (1978), Walter Coppens, and Francia Medina. There are unpublished field notebooks by Fèlix Cardona i Puig from the 1930s-1940s containing linguistic data of Sapé.

Perozo et al. (2008: 175–176) was also able to collect 44 words and 5 short phrases from semi-speakers living in the Ninam villages of Boca de Ichún and Kavamaikén and the Pemon village of Karunkén in Venezuela. Some of the Sapé semi-speakers have since moved to Yuwapí Merú, a village located on the Middle Paragua. There may also be semi-speakers of Sapé living in the Pemon village of Venevené (Benebené, Veneveken).

== Sociolinguistic situation ==
According to Rosés Labrada & Medina (2019), the last fluent speakers of Sapé were Elena Lezama, who died in 2004, and Ramón Quimillo Lezama, who died in November 2018. However, at least 2 semi-speakers remain. Traditionally located along the Karún River and the Upper Paragua River, most Sapé have assimilated into Pemon-speaking villages.

== Language contact ==
Jolkesky (2016) notes that there are lexical similarities with the Warao, Chibchan, Puinave-Kak, Jirajara, Tukano (especially Cubeo and Wanano), Arutani, and Máku language families due to contact.

Similarities with Chibchan are primarily with the Magdalena subgroup.
