= Jinkiori =

Archaeological site in Peru

Jinkiori or Jingkiori is an archaeological site consisting of petroglyphs engraved in a big rock called the “Monolith of Jinkiori". It is located in Paucartambo Province, region of Cusco, Peru.

== Location ==
The rock is located near Queros River, two hours walking from the town of Pilcopata.

== Recent studies ==
The petroglyphs that were engraved directly on the monolith have an Amazonian origin. There is also a strange engraving that resembles a key. These petroglyphs can be abstract representations of mythological or cosmological beliefs, made by people that have consumed ayahuasca (yajé). It is possible that the engravers were ancestors of Huachipaeri, an indigenous group that live until now in the Kosnipata valley.

An interesting characteristic of the Monolith is a little basin possibly of artificial origin. There is the possibility that the basin was used as recipient where the corn was stuffed in order to transform it into a typical Amazonian drink called chicha. Another theory is that the little basin could have been used to purify a baby, submerging him inside the basin full of water.
