= Arutani–Sape languages =

Proposed language family

Arutane–Sape
- Kalianan
- (defunct?)
- Geographic distribution: Brazil–Venezuela border
- Linguistic classification: Proposed language family
- Subdivisions: Arutani; Sape †; ? Máku †

Language codes
- Glottolog: None
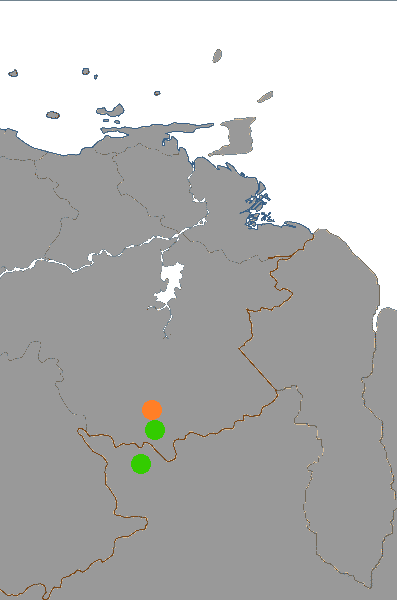
- Documented location of Arutani–Sapé languages. The two most southern spots are Arutani villages; the northern one is Sapé location.

Arutani–Sape, also known as Awake–Kaliana or Kalianan, is a proposed language family that includes two of the most poorly documented languages in South America, both of which are now moribund or extinct. They are at best only distantly related. Kaufman (1990) found a connection convincing, but Migliazza & Campbell (1988) maintained that there is no evidence for linking them. The two languages are,

- Arutani (also known as Aoaqui, Auake, Auaque, Awake, Oewaku, Orotani, Uruak, Urutani)
- Sape (also known as Caliana, Chirichano, Kaliana, Kariana)

Kaufman (1990) states that a further connection with Máku (Maku of Roraima/Auari) is "promising". (See Macro-Puinavean languages.)

== Vocabulary ==
=== Migliazza (1978) ===
Migliazza (1978) gives the following Swadesh list table for Uruak, Sape, and Máku ("Maku"):

no.	gloss	Uruak	Sape	Máku
1	I	maykate/ma-/tsa-	mɨ	teːne
2	thou	kaykate/ka-	kapɨ	eːne
3	we	materya	mɨyono	teːkene
4	this	kiʔa	tɨsa	ki
5	that	ayta	tɨsami	kwa
6	who	maʔayokə	pante	toči
7	what	maya	pemente	čini
8	not	ãʔãy	atsam/ɨka	laʔa
9	all	kitate	kawen	peʔtaka
10	many	kaʔtyaw	kawen	eːsuʔu
11	one	kyoana/kyano	koka	nokuðamu
12	two	komana	kɨrya	baʔta
13	big	kwaya	konən	bote
14	long	šawi	karya	kaxi
15	small	sikipi	to	kudi
16	woman	kari	kapay	neːlabə
17	man	maʔkya	kwa	laːsəba
18	person	kina	kamon	dzoʔkude
19	fish	kotom	pə	meʔkəsa
20	bird	yopsa	čam	iːduba
21	dog	toari	to	dzoʔwi
22	louse	koʔka	čo	iːne
23	tree	šapi	tapa	oːba
24	seed	kuka	ku	küːte
25	leaf	aña	muyra	deːmu
26	root	aša	tu	leːmekeči
27	bark	kõhã	kui/kuy	čiːmu
28	skin	kõhã	kuy	čːmu
29	flesh	mitsa	mɨan	muči
30	blood	kaña	tsom	leːme
31	bone	mo	wina	aːmu
32	grease	wiñaya	kun	eːkünü
33	egg	kokama	kupi	küʔte
34	horn	širipya	wina	eːkatso
35	tail	mašya	upi	neːto
36	feather	oša	ičam upa	kuːte
37	hair	oša	pa	kuːte
38	head	kwate	moynaku	keːte
39	ear	watika	awi	čikaʔte
40	eye	kohap	amku	sukute
41	nose	wa/kwa	ayku	pi
42	mouth	maʔa	itu	wɨːči
43	tooth	ka	pɨka	wuːmu
44	tongue	takõhã	matu	duːte
45	claw	šopti	ičam aypa	sukuči
46	foot	šate	ikora	basuku
47	knee	korokopsa	mɨney	basəkate
48	hand	maša/mama	piča apa	suku
49	belly	tsya	tukuy	sɨkɨči
50	neck	šoropaña	pokoy	lipite
51	breasts	kotsa	wi	čüčü
52	heart	kirakote	pokowi	səbuku
53	liver	ika	mapi	iːsa
54	drink	oyta/ayta	pe	mi
55	eat	pa/kapa	ko/ku	ki
56	bite	psa/pasa	pu	bü
57	see	kina	mow	ku
58	hear	ko	man	ne
59	know	kina	mow	nimi
60	sleep	anə	paku/ku	we
61	die	atay	siya	kinə
62	kill	rio (beat)	kaya	šipinu
63	swim	ša	pə	lawa
64	fly	šan	karu	nü
65	walk	ma	paru	te
66	come	mana	ma	na
67	lie down	kio/taa	pɨre	ða
68	sit	naka	maye	sɨkɨ
69	stand	kara	pa	kəy
70	give	matso	emeyma	se
71	say	mataka/tsama	mo	šini/šibu
72	sun	uši	ñam	keʔle
73	moon	aʔtap	tapo	ya
74	star	okihat	ñayino	ðaoku
75	water	akohã	nam	naʔme
76	rain	akohã	nam posoe	naʔme
77	stone	muka	takuypa	liːne
78	sand	iñãkosa	inoku	lunükü
79	earth	iñã	inokučin	boʔte
80	cloud	karapaso	usəyna	sapənawi
81	smoke	šana	yui	čipe
82	fire	ani	šoko	nühẽ
83	ash	šoni	tukutu	meːte
84	burn	asipa	šoko	we/niʔ
85	path	aʔma	mu	iːkilu
86	mountain	piʔa	takwa	wiːke
87	red	araʔwi	ayña	leme
88	green	atehe	šanurua	nüčü
89	yellow	pišio	pusia	kaləmadə
90	white	araway	sae	kaləmate
91	black	sipan/soson	tsaiña	kabi/weʔči
92	night	tose	useyna	iːkisu
93	hot	kuri	ɨrɨa	we
94	cold	roma/kima	unkoya	antsu/mihu
95	full	topi	ukwa	suku
96	new	koma	yenkoña	asi
97	good	taseri	amayñakoa	kuduma/eːdi
98	round	siari	način	kuməsa
99	dry	šona	patokwa	kaːte
100	name	rawi	marua	entse

== See also ==
- Macro-Puinavean languages
