= Warao =

Warao may refer to:

- Warao people
- Warao language
