= International Work Group for Indigenous Affairs =

International non-governmental organization

- Founded: 1968
- Type: Non-governmental organization
- Purpose: Indigenous rights
- Location: Copenhagen, Denmark
- Region served: Worldwide
- Expenses: DKK 38.944.825 (2019)
- Employees: 18 (2019)
- Website: iwgia.org

The International Work Group for Indigenous Affairs (IWGIA) is an independent and non-profit international human rights-based membership organization, whose central charter is to endorse and promote the collective rights of the world's indigenous peoples. Established in 1968, the IWGIA is registered as a non-profit organization in Denmark, with the head office of its secretariat based in Copenhagen. IWGIA's work is primarily funded by the Nordic Ministries of Foreign Affairs and the European Union.

IWGIA holds consultative status with the United Nations Economic and Social Council (ECOSOC) and has observer status with the Arctic Council and with the African Commission on Human and Peoples' Rights.

== History ==
The constitution of the IWGIA as a body was first proposed and initiated in August 1968, at the 38th International Congress of Americanists, held in Munich and Stuttgart. Formed as a co-operative of academic anthropologist researchers and human rights activists, the IWGIA was initially concerned with redressing the threats posed by the rapid development of settlements and industries to the indigenous groups living in the Amazon Basin. A network for indigenous advocacy and activism was first established in Brazil and Paraguay, with the IWGIA later expanding its activities and involvement to the concerns of indigenous American peoples generally. Subsequently, the IWGIA's working groups, advocacy support and research publications extended to cover indigenous issues across all continental regions of the globe.

IWGIA was one of the first organisations to be established in support of indigenous peoples. It was founded in 1968 by anthropologists concerned at the atrocities being committed against Indians in South America. Within a few years, a small group of dedicated scholars working on a voluntary basis had managed to establish a documentation centre that became well-known to concerned people the world over. The project grew to encompass international human rights work, empowerment projects, publishing and information dissemination.

Since the May 28, 2000 adoption of changes to its statutes, the IWGIA has been incorporated as a membership organization, whose base membership contributes an annual subscription fee towards the running of the organization and funding of its activities.

=== Directors ===
- 1968–1971 Lars Persson, Helge Kleivan
- 1971–1981 Helge Kleivan
- 1981–1983 Collective leadership of Jørgen Brøchner Jørgensen, Diana Vinding, Elisabeth Nonell, Fiona Wilson and Teresa Aparicio
- 1983–1987 Andrew Gray, Teresa Aparicio and Jørgen Brøchner Jørgensen
- 1987–1989 Andrew Gray and Teresa Aparicio
- 1989–1994 Teresa Aparicio and Jens Dahl
- 1994–1998 Inger Sjørslev
- 1998–2006 Jens Dahl
- 2006–2013 Lola García-Alix
- 2014–2015 Orla Bakdal
- 2015–2017 Interim directors: Marianne Wiben Jensen (interim), Lola García-Alix, and Kathrin Wessendorf
- 2017–2019 Julie Koch
- 2020–Present Kathrin Wessendorf

== Activities ==
2019 saw an improvement in the statistics and data surrounding Indigenous Peoples. The International Labour Organisation published a lower-bound estimate of 476 million Indigenous people globally. IWGIA's work was cited in the report, while the World Bank and ILO both acknowledge that despite Indigenous Peoples making up only 6% of the global population, they make up 15% of the world’s extreme poor.

IWGIA support indigenous peoples' organisations through its regional and thematic programmes. As of December 2019, IWGIA has changed its institutional focus from three regional programmes - on Africa, Latin America and Asia - and one country programme, supporting indigenous peoples in the Russian Federation, plus a programme on climate change, supporting indigenous participation in international climate change processes and local activities and awareness raising related to national REDD+ strategies to four thematic programmes.

The four thematic programmes IWIGA works with in 2019 are climate, land rights, Indigenous rights defenders at risk, and global governance. Alongside these thematic programmes are programmes on communications and documentation and alliances and engagement.

== Publications ==
IWGIA's publications programme has been integrated into communications and documentation and includes the publication of IWGIA's yearbook "The Indigenous World", as well as a variety of books, human rights reports, briefing papers, manuals and videos mostly in English and Spanish. However, IWGIA has also occasionally published in Danish, Hindi, French and other languages.

Its regular publications have included the following:

- IWGIA Newsletter (quarterly magazine) 1968-1993
- Indigenous Affairs (quarterly magazine) 1994-2010
- IWGIA Yearbook (annual magazine and organizational report) 1986-1992
- IWGIA Annual Report (organizational report) 1985-present
- The Indigenous World (annual magazine)) 1994-present

== See also ==
- Survival International
