= Katukinan languages =

Language family of South America

Katukinan
- Kanamari
- Geographic distribution: Amazonas and Acre, Brazil
- Linguistic classification: Harákmbut–Katukinan: Katukinan
- Subdivisions: Katukína-Kanamarí; Katawixi

Language codes
- Glottolog: katu1274

Katukinan (Catuquinan) is a language family consisting of two languages in Brazil, Katukina-Kanamarí and the perhaps moribund Katawixi. It is often not clear which names in the literature, which are generally tribal names and often correspond to dialects, refer to distinct languages. Indeed, they are close enough that some consider them all to be dialects of a single language, Kanamari.

Campbell (2012) notes that Adelaar "presents reasonably persuasive evidence that Harákmbut and Katukinan are genetically related."

== Language contact ==
Jolkesky (2016) notes that there are lexical similarities with the Jivaro, Máku (Jukude), Mura-Matanawi, Puinave-Nadahup, Taruma, Tupi, Yanomami, and Arawak language families due to contact. This suggests that Katukinan and the language families with which it was in contact had been earlier spoken within a central Amazon interaction sphere.

== Classification ==
Many ethnic Katukina had shifted to other languages by the time of European contact. Examples are Panoan Katukina and unclassified Katukinaru.

The common suffix dyapa, djapa means 'tribe' or 'clan', for which the varieties are named. Fabre (2005) lists Kanamarí, Txuhuã-djapá, Katukína do Jutaí (Katukina proper), and Katawixi as four attested languages.

The Tsohom Djapa are believed to speak a Katukinan language.

=== Loukotka (1968) ===
A large number of Katukinan dialects have gone extinct. Loukotka (1968) illustrates data from Catuquina (Wiri-dyapá, of the Jutaí River), Canamari, Parawa (Hon-dyapa), and Bendiapa,. Canamari, Parawa, and Bendiapa (Beñ-Dyapá) may constitute a single language, as may Tucundiapa (Mangeroma, Tucano Dyapa, Tsohom-Djapá, Hon-dyapa, Txunhuã-Djapá). He also notes a Tawari (Tauaré, Kadekili-dyapa, Kayarára), and a Buruá (Burue, Buruhe), of which nothing has been recorded. All of them are classified as "Southern Catuquina" except for Catauixi, which is the only "Northern Catuquina" language. The locations of each variety given by Loukotka (1968) are:

- Catuquina / Wiri-dyapá - spoken on the Jutaí River
- Canamari - spoken in the state of Amazonas on the Juruá River
- Parawa / Hon-dyapá - Grégorio River near Santo Amaro
- Tucundiapa / Mangeroma - Itecoaí River (Itaquai River)
- Bendiapa - São José River
- Tawari / Kadekili-dyapá / Kayarára - spoken north of the Bendiapa tribe
- Buruá - spoken on the Biá River and Jutaí River (Unattested)

=== Mason (1950) ===
Mason (1950) gives Pidá-Dyapá and Kutiá-Dyapá as dialects of Catukina, and Cadekili-Dyapá and Wadyo-Paraniñ-Dyapá (Kairara) as dialects of Tawari, corresponding to Loukotka's names Kadekili-dyapa and Kayarára. He adds Catukino and a "miscellaneous" list of Amena-Dyapá, Cana-Dyapá, Hon-Dyapá (which Loukotka identifies with Parawa), Marö-Dyapá, Ururu-Dyapá, and Wiri-Dyapá (which Loukotka identifies with Catuquina). Mason's (1950) internal classification of Catukina is summarized as follows.

- Catukina
  - Beñ-Dyapá (Bendiapa)
  - Burue (Buruhe)
  - Canamari
  - Catawishi (Hewadie)
  - Catukina
    - Pidá-Dyapá
    - Kutiá-Dyapá
  - Catukino
  - Parawa
  - Tawari (Tauaré)
    - Cadekili-Dyapá
    - Wadyo-Paraniñ-Dyapá (Kairara)
  - Tucun-Dyapá (Tucano Dyapa, Mangeroma)
  - (miscellaneous)
    - Amena-Dyapá
    - Cana-Dyapá
    - Hon-Dyapá
    - Marö-Dyapá
    - Ururu-Dyapá
    - Wiri-Dyapá

== See also ==
- Macro-Puinavean

== Bibliography ==
- dos Anjos, Z. (2011). Fonologia e Gramática Katukina-Kanamari. Amsterdam: Vrije Universiteit Amsterdam. (Doctoral dissertation).
- Groth, Ch. (1977). Here and There in Canamarí. Anthropological Linguistics, 19:203- 215.
- Ssila, M. et al. (1989). Elementos da fonologia Kanamari. Cadernos de Estudos Lingüísticos, 16:123-141.
- Tastevin, C. (n.d.). Dialecte katawixy. (Manuscript).
- Tastevin, C. (n.d.). Langue canamari. (Manuscript).
