= Katawixi language =

Katukinian language of Brazil

Katawixi
- Native to: Brazil
- Region: Amazonas
- Ethnicity: 250 Katawixi (2006)
- Native speakers: 10 (2006)
- Language family: Harákmbut–Katukinan: Katukinian; Katawixi

Language codes
- ISO 639-3: xat
- Glottolog: kata1270
- ELP: Katawixi

Katawixi (Catawishi) is a Katukinian language formerly spoken in Amazonas, Brazil. It is nearly extinct among the known populations of Katawixi people, though an uncontacted group nearby may be Katawixi-speaking. Only a handful of isolated tribes still speak this language.

== Vocabulary ==
The following wordlist of Katawixi is taken from Loukotka (1949), which republishes a 1921 manuscript.

Katawixi wordlist
Gloss	Katawixi
caiman	kadyuhe
tooth	hí-i
water	wãpti
large	dyanakse
man	bitso
jaguar	wangka
tongue	no
moon	kuéyi
corn	barbara
cassava	mãhĩ
eye	erada
ear	kirába
parrot	awáru
small	purati
sun	diwa
tobacco	wasara
tapir	kiaa
head	tu kãe
