= Andrew Gray (anthropologist) =

Andrew Gray (21 July 1955 in Cardiff, Wales, United Kingdom – 7 May 1999, near Vanuatu) was a British anthropologist and activist for the rights of indigenous peoples.

== Life ==
Gray graduated from the University of Edinburgh in 1973 and received a PhD from the University of Oxford in 1983 for his work studying the Arakmbut people of the Peruvian Amazon.

He then became director of the International Work Group for Indigenous Affairs (IWGIA), a post he held for six years. After leaving the IWGIA in 1989, he continued to act as a consultant for them and for related organisations such as the World Rainforest Movement, the International Alliance of Indigenous and Tribal Forest Peoples, the Gaia Foundation and Anti-Slavery International.

Although he lectured at the University of Copenhagen and the University of Oxford, Gray avoided a conventional academic career and never took up a full-time research post. He continued to publish academic work, most notably The Arakmbut of Amazonian Peru (three vols, 1996–1997). He also spent a large amount of time on fieldwork, visiting and talking to indigenous groups worldwide.

At the time of his death, was vice-chair of the IWGIA, and was working in the Pacific. Whilst travelling in the region, the light aircraft he was in came down in the sea off Vanuatu; he survived the crash, but was separated from the group of survivors before they made it to shore, and was presumed dead.
