= Leco people =

Ethnic group of Bolivia

The Leco people are an ethnic group in Bolivia that live in the Bolivian Amazon region, in the western part of the country. They numbered 13,527 in 2012 of which 189 spoke the Leco language natively.
