= Harákmbut–Katukinan languages =

Language family of South America

Harákmbut–Katukinan
- Geographic distribution: Peru, Brazil
- Linguistic classification: One of the world's primary language families
- Subdivisions: Harákmbut; Katukinan; ?Arawan

Language codes
- Glottolog: None

Harákmbut–Katukinan is a language family linking the South American indigenous language families Harákmbut and Katukinan. There is reasonably good evidence that the two are related. Glottolog does not accept it, stating that the pronouns, numerals, or bound morphology are not cognate. Jolkesky (2011) also adds Arawan to the family.

== Family division ==
- Harákmbut–Katukinan
  - Harákmbut
    - Huachipaeri (also known as Huachipaire, Wacipaire)
    - Amarakaeri
  - Katukinan
    - Katukina-Kanamari (also known as Kanamarí)
    - Katawixi (also known as Catawishi)
  - ?Arawan

Jolkesky (2011) concludes Arawan is closer to Harákmbut than to Katukinan.

Internal branching of the Arawá-Katukína-Harakmbet family according to Jolkesky (2011):

- - Katukína
  - - Arawá
    - - Harakmbet

== Language contact ==
Jolkesky (2016) notes that there are lexical similarities with Arawakan languages due to contact.

== Vocabulary ==
The following table from Adelaar (2000) lists lexical cognates between Kanamari and Harákmbut:

no.	Spanish gloss (original)	English gloss (translated)	Kanamarí	Harakmbut
1	casa	house	hak	hák
2	diente	tooth	i	-id
3	pie	foot	i	-iʔ
4	nariz	nose	o(h) pak	-õh
5	cabeza	head	ki	-kɨ
6	río	river	wa(h)	-wɛ̃ʰ
7	huevo	egg	takarapu	po 'objeto redondo (round object)'
8	lengua	tongue	noko	nõʔ
9	mano	hand	ba	-ᵐba
10	hoja	leaf	hakba, taroba	eʔᵐba
11	estómago	stomach	ma	wa-mẽʔ 'hígado (liver)'
12	ojo	eye	iko	-kpo
13	sangre	blood	mimi	mĩmĩ
14	barriga	belly	min	-mĩn 'intestino (intestines)'
15	brazo	arm	pan	wa-ᵐbaʔagᵑ 'omóplato (shoulderbone)'
16	jaguar	jaguar	pida(h)	apetpet
17	nombre	name	wadik	-ⁿdik
18	dentro, en	inside, in	naki	wa-ẽk 'barriga (belly)'
19	yuca	yucca	tawa 'yuca (variedad dulce) (sweet variety of yuca)'	táᵊre
20	campo cultivado	cultivated field	bao(h)	[taʔ]ᵐba
21	negro	black	tik	sik-ⁿda
22	camino	road	dan	ⁿagᵑ
23	nuevo	new	(a)boawa	-ᵐbo-ⁿda
24	palo, árbol	stick, tree	o(h)man	wẽⁱmẽⁱ
25	carne	meat	barahai	áiʔ 'hueso (bone)'; -hẽn 'carne (meat)'
26	comer	eat	pu	pe
27	venir	come	dakdyi	e-tʃiak
28	defecar	defecate	dokna	ⁿdoʔ
29	llegar; ir	arrive; go	waokdyi 'llegar'	waʔ 'ir'
30	leña	firewood	i(h)ta	ɨtaʔ
31	tobillo	ankle	itakon	itak-pi 'espinilla (shin)' (Huachipairi)
32	nube	cloud	kodo'omi	kurudⁿ
33	cielo	sky	kodoh	kɨ'rɨdⁿ
34	viejo; finado	old; dead	kidak 'ser viejo (be old)'	kʉuⁿdak 'finado (dead)'
35	quebrar, romper	break	kuruk	ketek
36	venado	deer	ba(h)tyi	ᵐbáwiʰ
37	cargar	load	ik	yʉuk
38	piel	skin	dak	-síⁿdak
39	animal	animal	bara 'caza, animal (game, animal)'	aᵐbʉuredⁿ
40	hermano	brother	aponpia	pogᵑ 'hermano mayor de la mujer (elder brother of wife)'
41	padre	father	pama	áːpagᵑ
42	madre	mother	nyama	náŋʔ
43	cabello	hair	poi	-wih 'vello (body hair)'
44	cuerpo	body	boro	ᵐboroʔ 'grande (big)'
45	soplar	blow	po(h)po(h)[man]	po
46	dormir	sleep	kitan	táⁱʔ
47	niño	boy	opu 'hijo; pequeño (son; small)'	wa-ʂí-po
48	humo	smoke	omi	oʔsĩwĩ
49	hamaca	hammock	homo	horoʔɛʔ
50	volver	return	kinhina	korʉudⁿ
51	lluvia	rain	hin	ówiʔ
52	hermana (vocativo)	sister (vocative)	miyo	mĩŋʔ
53	testículos	testicles	pada kon	wãⁿda 'fruita redonda u oblonga (round or oblong fruit)'

For a list of cognates sets by Jolkesky (2011), see the corresponding Portuguese article.
