= Máku language =

Extinct language of South America

Máku
- Native to: Roraima, Brazil
- Region: Brazilian–Venezuelan border
- Ethnicity: Jukudeitse
- Extinct: 2000, with the death of Kuluta (Sinfrônio Magalhães)
- Language family: Language isolate (Kalianan? Macro-Puinavean?)

Language codes
- ISO 639-3: xak
- Glottolog: maku1246

- Máku is classified as Extinct by the UNESCO Atlas of the World's Languages in Danger

Máku is an unclassified language and likely language isolate and was formerly spoken on the Brazil–Venezuela border in Roraima along the upper Uraricoera and lower Auari rivers, west of Boa Vista, by the Jukude-itse ([ʝokudeˈit͜se] or [ʑokudeˈit͜se]) or 'people'. The last speaker, Kuluta (Sinfrônio Magalhães), died in 2000. There are currently no speakers or rememberers of the language and no one identifies as Jukude today. Aryon Rodrigues and Ernesto Migliazza, as well as Iraguacema Lima Maciel, worked on the language, and the data was collected into a grammar by Chris Rogers and published in 2020.

== Geographical distribution ==
300 years ago, the Jukude territory was between the Padamo and Cunucunuma rivers to the southwest.

== Name ==
The people called themselves jukude-itse [zokudeitse] (person-PL) 'people'. When speaking to outsiders, they referred to themselves as [ˈmaku] or [ˈmako]. Maku ~ Mako (in Spanish orthography Macu or Maco) is an Arawakan term for unintelligible languages and people held in servitude in the Orinoco region. (See Maku (exonym) for a partial list.) While the stress of the word in other languages called 'Maku' may be on either the first or final syllable, as Máku/Mácu or Makú/Macú (Migliazza, Fabré), the word was pronounced with initial stress by the jukudeitse and so the exonym is often written with stress on the first syllable: Máku (Dixon & Aikhenvald 1999, Maciel 1991, and Rogers 2020) or Máko (Campbell 2012), though also Makú (Zamponi) or simply Maku (Migliazza). The disambiguator Maku-Auari has also been used.

== Classification ==
Suggested genetic relations involving Máku include:

- with Arawakan
- with Warao
- within a Kalianan grouping with Arutani–Sape (a.k.a. Makú)
- within a Macro-Puinavean grouping with Nadahup (a.k.a. Makú), Katukinan, and Arutani–Sape

Kaufman (1990) finds the Kalianan proposal "promising", though he is now dated.

=== Language contact ===
Jolkesky (2016) notes that there are lexical similarities with the Sape, Arutani, and Warao languages, as well as the Saliba-Hodi, Tikuna-Yuri, Katukina-Katawixi, and Arawa language families due to contact.

== Phonology ==
The Máku syllable structure is (C)(C)V(V)(C).

=== Consonants ===
Consonants
| | | Bilabial | Alveolar | Palatal | Velar | Glottal |
|---|---|---|---|---|---|---|
| Stop | voiceless | p | t | | k | ʔ |
| Stop | voiced | b | d | | | |
| Affricate | | | t͡s | | | |
| Fricative | | ɸ | s | | | h |
| Nasal | | m | n | | | |
| Approximant | | w | l | j | | |

/k/ is voiced to [g] intervocalically and can occasionally be realized as [g] in other environments too.

/j/ is sometimes realized as [ʑ] word-initially before /a u/ or word-medially, as in /jukude/ [ʑokude̞] 'person'. It can occasionally be fronted to [ð] or [z] intervocalically.

Nasals assimilate to the place of articulation of the stop they precede.

/w/ is realized as [ʋ] before /i e/. It is realized as [ʋ] or [ɥ] before /y/ (a sequence which only occurs in the word /lymywy/ 'take'). Rogers (2020) does not state that /w/ is realized as [ʋ] before /ɨ/, but provides the example /wɨtsɨ/ [ʋɨtsɨ] 'mouth'.

/d/ is realized as laminal before [u] – in some words this is in free variation with [d].

/s, ts, n, k/ are palatalized to [ʃ, tʃ, ɲ, c] before /i, y/, while /t, d, l/ become [tʲ, dʲ, lʲ].

=== Vowels ===
Vowels
| | Front | | Central | Back |
| | unrounded | rounded | unrounded | rounded |
|---|---|---|---|---|
| High | i | y | ɨ | u |
| Mid | e | | | (o) |
| Low | | | a | |

Although there exist minimal pairs between /o/ and /u/, some words show free variation between /u/ and /o/, and [o] is an allophone of /u/ in some environments. Rogers (2020) hypothesizes that these patterns are a result of a diachronic sound change in progress and that /o u/ do not represent separate phonemes synchronically.

Apart from the sequences [eo], [au~ao] and [ia], as well as /ai oi/ [aj oj] within a word stem, vowel-vowel sequences are resolved by deleting the first vowel of the sequence, e.g. /teana/ [tana] 'I smell (it)'. The first vowel in a stem may also be deleted in fast speech.

/a/ and /e/ are realized as [ə] when unstressed.

High and mid vowels are lowered word-finally.

Vowels are nasalized following a nasal consonant, /ʔ/ or /h/.

== Grammar ==
Máku nouns and verbs inflect for person - either the person of the possessor, on nouns, expressed by a prefix, or of the subject and object, on verbs, which may be prefixes, infixes or suffixes, depending on the verb. There are also suffixes which express plurality of a possessor or subject. The language marks clusivity by distinguishing first person singular from first + second person (inclusive), first + third person (exclusive) and first + second + third person ('unified'). Nouns also inflect for number and case via suffixes. Verbs also inflect for tense, aspect, mood, evidentiality and negation via suffixes.

Noun phrases exhibit the word order possessor possessor-possessed, or noun-modifier. Demonstratives and numerals typically occur before the nouns they modify. There are postpositions which follow nouns.

Intransitive clause word order is typically subject-verb, and transitive clause word order is most commonly SOV. Indirect objects are typically placed after the verb. Phrases which represent new, focused referents may be fronted to the start of a clause or sentence. Any phrase in focus, both nominal and verbal, can take the focus enclitic =ke.

Máku has motion-complement serial verb constructions, with subject-verbal complement-motion verb order.

Coordination is accomplished via juxtaposition, at the phrase and clause levels.

=== Nouns ===
Máku nouns decline for number, case and possession. Possession is expressed by a prefix, with certain nonsingular possessors adding a separate suffix. Nonsingular number and case are expressed as suffixes. The Máku noun template is poss-stem-poss.nsg-nsg-case, as demonstrated by the following examples.

ene e- tsimala Ø- uba -nuʔu -itse
2 2- arrow 3SG- tree -SAP.PL -NOM.PL
'your [pl.] bows'

uʔsi -itse -daj
other -PL -COM.PL
'with others'

==== Possession ====
The following sample paradigms illustrate the possessive morphemes – note the three-way clusivity distinction, differentiating both 1+2 (inclusive) and 1+3 (exclusive) as well as the case where the speaker, listener and other(s) are included (1+2+3), which Rogers (2020) refers to as 'unified'. The alienable and inalienable possessive paradigms only differ in the expression of the 3sg morpheme. The 1st person inclusive and 3rd person nonsingular forms are formally identical.

| Possessor | 'house' (alienable) | 'mouth' (inalienable) |
|---|---|---|
| 1sg | te-mine | te-wɨtsi |
| 1+2 | tse-mine | tse-wɨtsi |
| 1+2+3 | tse-mine-nuʔu | tse-wɨtsi-nuʔu |
| 1+3 | teke-mine | teke-wɨtsi |
| 2sg | e-mine | e-wɨtsi |
| 2nsg | e-mine | e-wɨtsi(-nuʔu) |
| 3sg | e-mine | Ø-watsi |
| 3nsg | tse-mine | tse-wɨtsi |

The stem change on 'mouth' in the non-3sg possessed forms is one example of an inalienably possessed noun exhibiting a suppletive stem with overt possessive prefixes, of which there are others in Máku.

Note also the following, as an example of an alienably possessed noun with -nuʔu in the 2nsg possessed form.

e- meʔkasa -nuʔu
2 fish PL
'your [nsg.] fish'

==== Number ====
Number is marked by a nonsingular suffix -itse, which does not depend on animacy. This suffix is not realized for semantically plural referents when the noun is treated as a collective group, or if the noun is modified by a numeral or quantifier.

==== Case ====
There are nine attested case suffixes in Máku:

| Case | Suffix | Example |
|---|---|---|
| Comitative singular | -siky | Ø-eneʔmu-siky Ø-lukia; 3SG-brother-COM.SG 3SG.SUBJ-be.old 'with his older brother' |
| Comitative plural | -daj | uʔsi-itse-daj other-PL-COM.PL 'with others' |
| Dative, allative | -le | adiata-le place.below-LAT 'downwards' |
| Terminative | -ky | waʔpite-ky sky-TERM 'up to the sky' |
| Ablative | -leʔni | waʔpite-leʔni sky-ABL 'from the sky' |
| Elative, prolative | -waʔni | na-waʔni water-ELA 'on the water' |
| Locative, instrumental | -ʔsa | waʔpite-ʔsa sky-LOC 'in the sky' |
| Inessive | -wa | tse-watsi-wa 1+2-mouth-INE 'in our [incl.] mouth' |
| Temporal | -de | desembru-de December-TEMP 'in December' |

=== Pronouns ===
Máku pronouns mark person, number and clusivity.

Personal pronouns
| Person | Singular | Dual | Plural |
|---|---|---|---|
| 1 | tene | – | |
| 1+2 | – | tsene | tsenenuʔu |
| 1+3 | – | tekene | tekenenuʔu |
| 1+2+3 | – | | tenenuʔu |
| 2 | ene | enenuʔu | |
| 3 | oje | ojtse | |

There are at least two demonstrative pronouns ki 'this' and (a)kwa 'that' - these can take the locative, lative and inessive cases to form demonstrative adverbs.

=== Quantifiers ===
Numerals may take the classifiers -sy 'period of time' and -ʔnte 'body part', but these appear to be optional.

nukuja -sy keʔl-ia
one -CLF:time sun-moon
'one day'

The numerals one to four and peʔtaka 'all' are attested to agree in person with nouns they modify if the person is 1sg, 1exc or 2sg.

tekene teke- synialʔa te- luke -na
1+3 1+3- three 1- tall HAB
'We [excl.] three are tall.'

=== Verbs ===
Máku verbs inflect for subject and direct object as well as tense, aspect, mood, evidentiality and negation. Subject agreement can be marked via prefixes, infixes or suffixes, depending on the verb in question, and plural subjects add a suffix. Tense, aspect, mood, evidentiality and negation are expressed through suffixes. Object agreement precedes subject agreement, but is not well known due to lack of data. The relative ordering of the TAME morphemes is also not well known due to lack of documentation, although tense and aspect suffixes are mutually exclusive.

==== Subject agreement ====
Subject agreement
| Subject | Form | Examples | | | | |
| Subject | Form | leme 'be red' | inene 'be afraid' | kaj 'stand (transitive)' | kuntsi 'wash' | ku 'see' |
|---|---|---|---|---|---|---|
| 1sg | te | te-leme | i<te>nene | te-kaj | ku<te>tsi | ku-te |
| 1+2du | tse | tse-leme | – | – | ku<tsi>tsi | – |
| 1+2pl | tse-nuʔu | tse-leme-nuʔu | i<tse>nene-nuʔu | tse-kaj-nuʔu | – | ku-tse-nuʔu |
| 1+3 | teke | teke-leme | i<teke>nene | teke-kaj | ku<teki>tsi | ku-teke |
| 1+2+3 | te-nuʔu | – | i<te>nene-nuʔu | te-kaj-nuʔu | ku<te>tsi-nu | – |
| 2sg | ke | e-leme | i<ke>nene | ke-kaj | – | ku-seke |
| 2nsg | ke-nuʔu | e-leme-nuʔu | i<ke>nene-nuʔu | ke-kaj-nuʔu | – | – |
| 3sg | Ø | Ø-leme | i<Ø>nene | Ø-kaj | kun<Ø>tsi | ku-seke |
| 3nsg | tse(-pu) | tse-leme-pu | i<tse>nene | tse-kaj-pu | ku<tsi>tsi | kula-Ø |

The -pu in the 3pl subject marker is optional and indicates collectivity of an action.

==== Tense ====
There are five tense morphemes in Máku: distant past, recent past, present, near future, and distant future. While the tense boundaries are relative and not absolute, distant past is used just for mythological stories, and generally the distant future refers to events after the current day while the near future refers to events later in the day.

Tense suffixes
| Tense | Suffix |
|---|---|
| Distant past | -mutsa |
| Near past | -nka |
| Present | -Ø |
| Near future | -ba |
| Distant future | -diba |

==== Aspect ====
Máku has six aspect morphemes.

Aspect suffixes
| Aspect | Suffix |
|---|---|
| Permanent | -na |
| Temporary | -sia |
| Imperfective | -dbena |
| Perfective | -dia |
| Permanent progressive | -dkina |
| Temporary progressive | -dkisia |

The permanent aspect suffix -na is used only with stative verbs and marks permanent and inherent properties.

The temporary aspect suffix -sia indicates temporary properties when used with stative verbs, and unfinished action with active verbs.

The progressive aspect suffixes are present tense in meaning.

==== Mood ====
Mood suffixes
| Mood | Suffix |
|---|---|
| Indicative | -Ø |
| Imperative | -kɨ(se) |
| Hortative | -kada |
| Conditional | -wake |
| Purposive | -bana |

Verbs marked for the imperative do not have an explicit subject marker. However the hortative does agree with subject.

The conditional mood only occurs in multiclause constructions. However, the purposive can occur both in multiclause and monoclausal sentences, as shown in the below examples.

oja-ke Ø-ja-dia Ø-we-bana
3-FOC 3-lie.down-PFV 3-sleep-PURP
'He lies down to sleep.'

te- we -bana
1SG- sleep -PURP
'I will sleep.'

==== Evidentiality ====
Evidentiality suffixes
| Evidentiality | Suffix |
|---|---|
| Firsthand | -tsa |
| Non-firsthand | -nia |

The evidentiality suffixes are only used with past tense and are not obligatory.

==== Negation ====
Negation is signified by -ʔV, where the value of the vowel is the vowel before the suffix, unless followed by -bala, in which case it is /a/.

Transitive active verbs can optionally take the additional negative suffix -bala following -ʔV.

-ʔV can also be used as a prohibitive marker, as in

ke- we -ʔe
2- sleep -NEG
'Don't sleep!'

The negative suffix appears to precede the evidential suffixes, which appear to precede the tense suffixes, as in the following:

nyhe Ø- la -ʔa -tsa -mutsa asajtse -ke
fire 3SG- do -NEG -FIRSTH -DIST.PST long.time.ago -FOC
'There was no fire a long time ago.'

== Bibliography ==
- Campbell, Lyle (1997). American Indian Languages: The Historical Linguistics of Native America. New York: Oxford University Press. ISBN 0-19-509427-1.
- Campbell, Lyle; Grondona, Verónica, eds. (2012). The Indigenous Languages of South America: A Comprehensive Guide. Berlin: De Gruyter Mouton.
- Dixon & Aikhenvald (1999). "Máku", in The Amazonian Languages (pp. 361–362)
- Fabre, Alain (2005), Diccionario etnolingüístico y guía bibliográfica de los pueblos indígenas sudamericanos: Makú [Ethnolinguistic dictionary and bibliographic guide of the South American indigenous peoples: Makú] (PDF) (in Spanish)
- Kaufman, Terrence (1990). "Language History in South America: What We Know and How to Know More". In Payne, D. L. (ed.). Amazonian Linguistics: Studies in Lowland South American Languages. Austin: University of Texas Press. pp. 13–67. ISBN 0-292-70414-3.
- ——— (1994). "The Native Languages of South America". In Mosley, C.; Asher, R. E. (eds.). Atlas of the World's Languages. London: Routledge. pp. 46–76.
- Koch-Grünberg, Theodor (1922). "Die Volkgruppierung Zwischen Rio Branco, Orinoco, Rio Negro und Yapurá" [The Ethnic Group Between Rio Branco, Orinoco, Rio Negro and Yapurá]. In Lehmannn, Walter (ed.). Festschrift Eduard Seler (in German). Stuttgart: Strecker und Schröder. pp. 205–266.
- Maciel, Iraguacema (1991). Alguns aspectos fonológicos e morfológicos da língua Máku [Some phonological and morphological aspects of the Máku language] (Thesis) (in Portuguese). Universidade de Brasília.
- Migliazza, Ernesto (1965). "Fonología Makú", Boletim do MPEG. Antropología 25:1–17.
- ———— (1966). "Esbôço sintático de um corpus da língua Makú", Boletim do MPEG. Antropología 32:1–38.
- ———— (1978). "Makú, Sapé and Uruak languages. Current status and basic lexicon", AL 20/3:133–140.
- Rogers, Chris (2020). Máku: A Comprehensive Grammar. Taylor & Francis.
