= Uberaba Lake =

Lake in Bolivia and Brazil

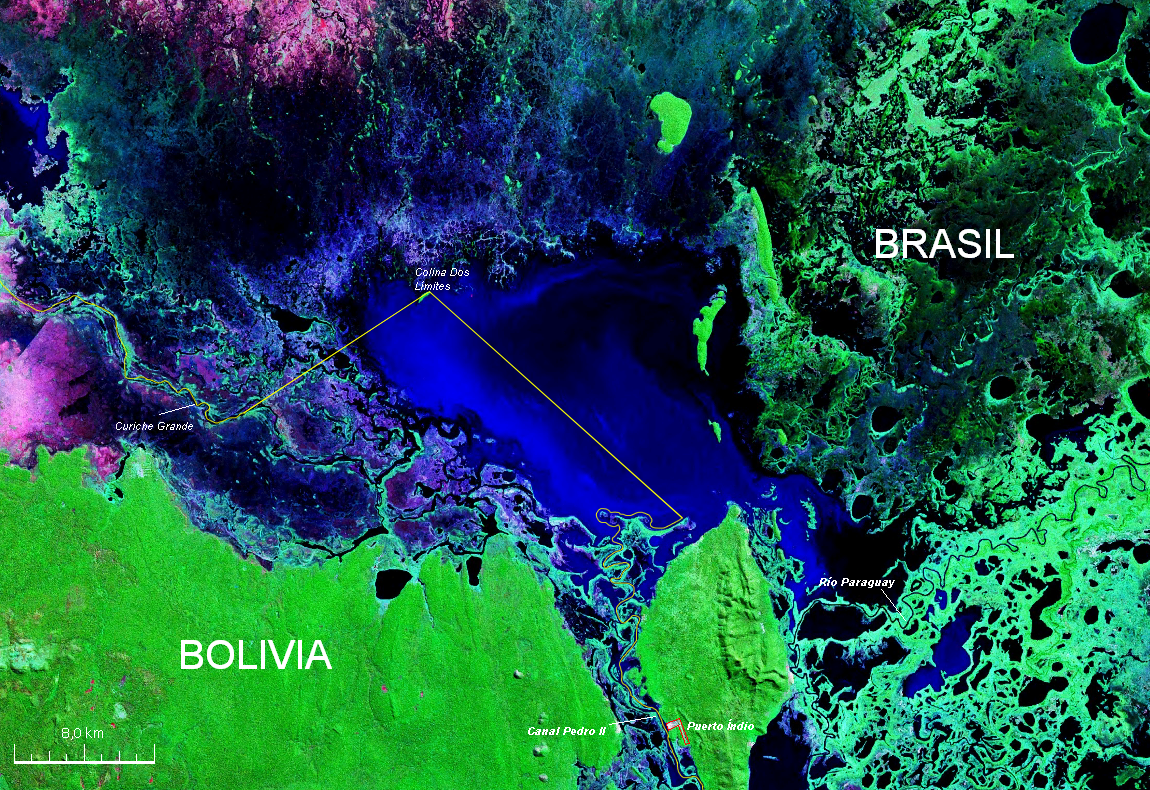
- A satellite view of the lake

- Location within Bolivia Location within Brazil Location within South America
- Interactive map of Uberaba Lake
- Location: Santa Cruz Department, Bolivia/Mato Grosso, Brazil
- Coordinates: 17°30′19″S 57°47′58″W
- Basin countries: Bolivia, Brazil
- Surface area: 400 km^{2} (150 sq mi)
- Surface elevation: 190 m (620 ft)

Uberaba Lake is a lake in the Santa Cruz Department of Bolivia and Mato Grosso, Brazil. Located at an elevation of 190 m, its surface area is 400 km^{2}. It is the largest lake in the Pantanal.
