= Brazil–Venezuela border =

International border

Map of Brazil and Venezuela

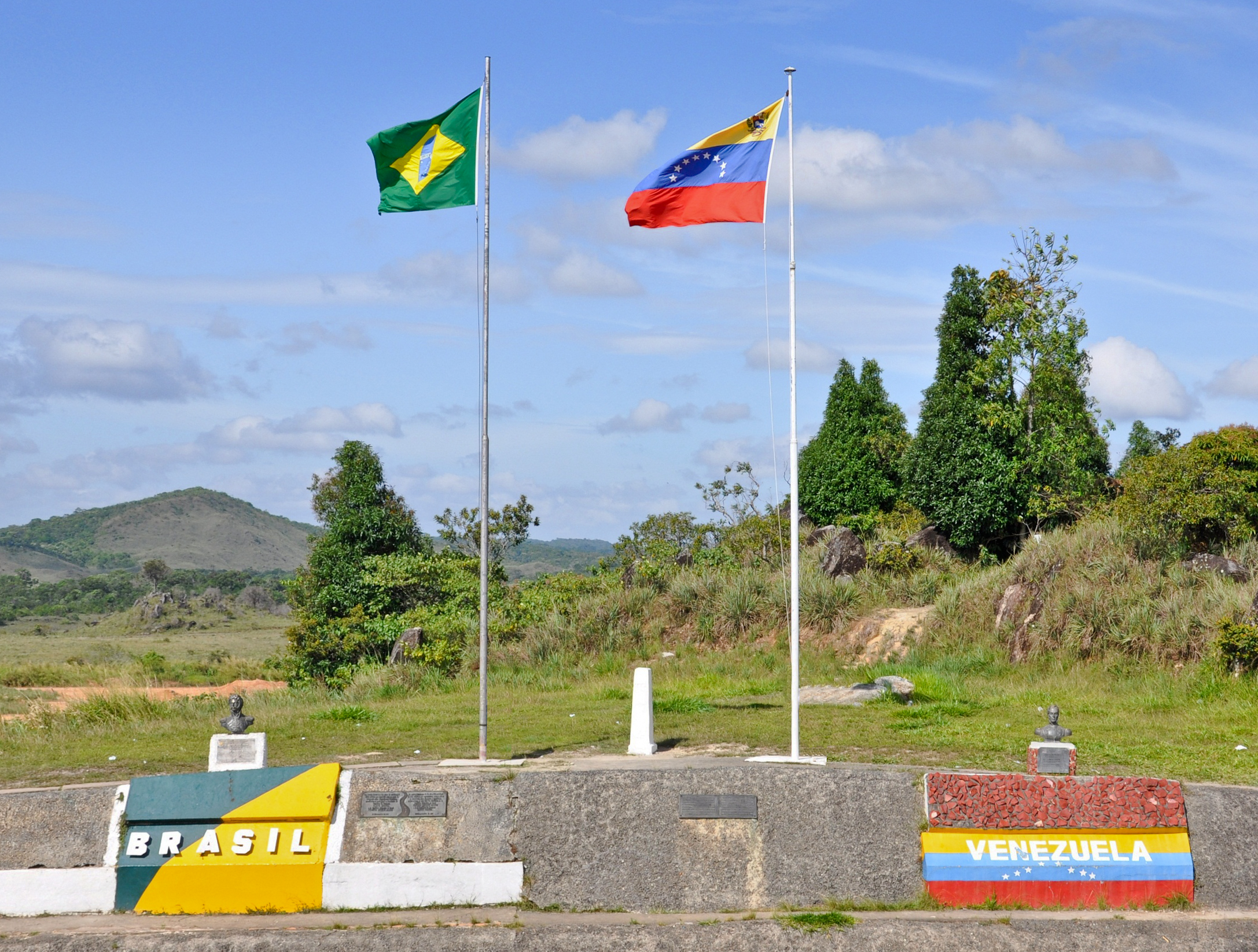
Brazil-Venezuela border

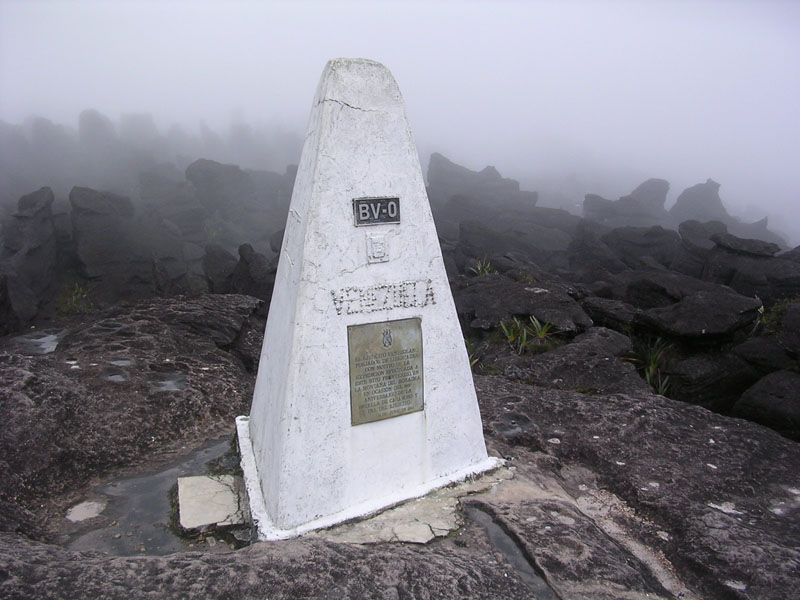
Tripoint between Brazil, Venezuela and Guyana located on Mount Roraima

The Brazil–Venezuela border is the limit that separates the territories of Brazil and Venezuela. It was delimited by the Treaty of Limits and River Navigation of May 5, 1859 and ratified by the Protocol of 1929. The geographical boundary begins at the triple point between Brazil-Colombia-Venezuela at Cucuy Rock and continues up the Maturacá channel to the Huá waterfall; it then follows a straight line to the top of a mountain called Cerro Cupi. It then follows the crest of the drainage divide between the Orinoco and Amazon river basins up to the Brazil-Guyana-Venezuela border tripoint on top of Mount Roraima, thus covering a total of 2,199 kilometres (of which 90 km are conventional boundaries and the other 2,109 km correspond to the watershed between the basins of the Amazon (Brazil) and Orinoco (Venezuela)) through the Imeri, Tapirapecó, Curupira and Urucuzeiro mountain ranges (Brazilian state of Amazonas), and the Parima, Auari, Urutanim and Pacaraima ranges (State of Roraima), in the Guiana Shield.

Historically, Brazil and Venezuela have both made land claims for the western portion of Guyana, referred to as the Guayana Esequiba by Venezuela. The tributaries of the Amazon that extend into Guyana were claimed by Brazil but this was settled during the Pirara arbitration in 1904. The Venezuelan claim to the area is not officially recognized by Brazil, and Guyana exerts effective control over the disputed region.

The internationally recognized border is mostly located in remote and inaccessible wilderness areas, and it has only one road crossing, between the towns of Pacaraima (Brazil) and Santa Elena de Uairén (Venezuela), where the Brazilian BR-174 federal highway from Boa Vista and Manaus joins the Venezuelan Troncal 10 from Ciudad Guayana and Caracas.

== History ==
=== Venezuelan crisis ===
In 2018, Roraima, Brazil's northernmost state, experienced a large influx of Venezuelan immigrants along its border. On August 7, the regional government requested that the Supreme Federal Court of Brazil close the border, and later that day the Supreme Federal Court denied the request on constitutional grounds.

On February 22, 2019, amid the Venezuelan presidential crisis, President Nicolás Maduro closed the border to prevent international humanitarian aid from reaching Venezuela by land. In May 2019, the Venezuelan government announced the re-opening of the border.

From January 11 to 14, 2025, the border was closed to Venezuelans entering Brazil and Colombia due to conflict over the third inauguration of Nicolás Maduro.

On January 4, 2026, the border was closed to Venezuelans attempting to enter Brazil following the 2026 United States strikes in Venezuela a day prior; however, Brazilians in Venezuela are allowed to cross the border. The Brazilian military is monitoring the border.

=== 2020 coronavirus pandemic ===
On March 16, 2020, President Jair Bolsonaro partially closed the border with Venezuela because of the COVID-19 pandemic to slow the spread, as the epidemic had advanced in Brazil with 291 confirmed cases and the first death reported on Tuesday. Health Minister Luiz Henrique Mandetta had urged closure of the border due to Venezuela's collapsing health system.

On March 17, 2020, the Venezuelan government implemented a nationwide quarantine after detecting 16 new cases of the novel coronavirus, President Nicolas Maduro said, adding that the total number of cases in the South American country has risen to 33, had begun a quarantine in a handful of states.
