= Puinave–Makú languages =

Proposed language family of Amazon

Puinave–Makú
- (dubious)
- Geographic distribution: Amazon
- Linguistic classification: Proposed language family
- Subdivisions: Nadahup; Puinave; Nukak-Kakwa; ?Hodï

Language codes
- Glottolog: None

Puinave–Makú is a proposed language family linking the Puinave and Nukak-Kakwa languages to the Nadahup family. Paul Rivet (1920) and other researchers proposed decades ago the hypothesis of a Puinave-Makú family. Later, Joseph Greenberg (1987) grouped the Puinave-Makú languages, together with the Tucano family, the Katukinan, Waorani and Ticuna languages in the Macro-Tukano trunk.

Puinave-Maku and the language isolate Máku (of Auari) are sometimes connected to the Arutani–Sape languages (yet again also known as Maku) in a Kalianan branch, a connection which Kaufman (1990) finds "promising", but there is too little data on these languages to know for sure. Hodï has been proposed specifically as a sister of Puinave–Maku as well.

Kaufman (1994: 60, 2007: 67–68) also adds Katukinan to the family.

== Language contact ==
Marcelo Jolkesky (2016) notes that there are lexical similarities with the Tupian, Harakmbet, Katukina-Katawixi, Arawak, and Karaja language families due to contact, pointing to an origin of Proto-Puinave-Nadahup in the Madeira River basin.

== Criticism ==
Epps (2008) criticizes the Puinave–Nadahup proposal for relying on inaccurate data, having no clear concept of basic vocabulary, and using an unsystematic mix of Nadahup languages in the comparison. The languages were originally linked simply because they are all called Maku 'babble' by Arawakans; that is, because they are spoken by hunter-gatherers.

Since then, some linguists have attempted to verify the connection by finding cognates. However, no convincing cognates have yet been found. For example, Rivet and Tastevin claim that the Hup pronoun am 'I' corresponds to Puinave am 'I', but the Hup pronoun ’am means 'you'; the Hup pronoun for 'I' is ’ãh. Other "strikingly similar" pairs, such as Puinave ueyu 'day' and Hup uerhó (wæd.hɔ́) 'sun', are not particularly convincing, and no regular sound correspondences have been detected.

On other hand, Martins (1999 and 2005) argues that it is possible to relate "eastern Makú" languages with the Nukak-Kakwa group, but he does not find evidence of the relationship with Puinave. Girón (2008) postulates a genetic relationship of the piave with proto-maku, but also the existence of another phone substrate that is not yet known.

== See also ==
- Arutani–Sape languages
- Naduhup languages
