= Warao language =

Language of the Warao people

Warao
- Guarauno
- Native to: Venezuela, Guyana, Suriname
- Ethnicity: Warao
- Native speakers: 32,800 (2005–2011)
- Language family: Language isolate (Waroid?)

Official status
- Official language in: Venezuela

Language codes
- ISO 639-3: wba
- Glottolog: wara1303
- ELP: Warao
- Linguasphere: 81-PAA-a
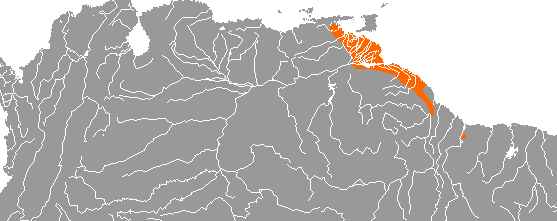

Warao (also known as Guarauno, Guarao, Warrau) is the Native language of the Warao people. A language isolate, it is spoken by about 33,000 people primarily in northern Venezuela, Guyana and Suriname. It is notable for its unusual object–subject–verb word order. The 2015 Venezuelan film Gone with the River was spoken in Warao.

== Classification ==
Warao appears to be a language isolate, unrelated to any recorded language in the region or elsewhere. A few obscure cultures such as the Waikerí of Nueva Esparta are reported to have spoken languages that were either Warao itself or related languages, but nothing is preserved of them.

Terrence Kaufman (1994) included it in his hypothetical Macro-Paezan family, but the necessary supporting work was never done.

=== Waroid hypothesis ===
Historical sources mention ethnic groups in the Orinoco Delta region such as Siawani (Chaguanes), Veriotaus (Farautes), and Tiuitiuas (Tibitíbis) that possibly either spoke Warao or languages closely related to it. There are also groups further afield from the delta that may have spoken Warao-related languages such as the Parawagoto, Arote, Aricari, Pirao, Mariusa and Waikeri.

There is also contested evidence for Warao and its hypothetical family, Waroid, formerly having a larger distribution. Boomert (2000) identified Warao toponyms, historical contacts, imports and oral traditions of Trinidad. A hypothesis arguing for Waroid presence further into the Caribbean is argued for by Granberry and Vescelius, and is considered plausible but lacking any substantial evidence.

== Language contact ==
Jolkesky (2016) notes that there are lexical similarities with the Cariban, Arutani, Máku, and Sape language families due to mutual contact within an earlier Guiana Highlands interaction sphere.

== Geographical distribution ==
The language had an estimated 28,100 speakers in Venezuela as of 2007. The Warao people mostly live in the Orinoco Delta region of northeastern Venezuela, with smaller communities in southwestern Trinidad (Trinidad and Tobago), western Guyana and Suriname. The language is considered endangered by UNESCO.

== Phonology ==
The Warao consonant inventory is small, but not quite as small as many other South American inventories.

	Labial	Alveolar	Palatal	Velar		Glottal
	Labial	Alveolar	Palatal	plain	labialized	Glottal
Plosive	p	t		k	kʷ	
Fricative		s				h
Nasal	m	n				
Tap		ɺ				
Approximant			j		w	

The labial plosive /p/ is usually realized as voiced [b]. /ɺ/ has an allophone [d] word-initially and [ɾ] when between /i, a/ and /a/.

There are five oral vowels /a, ɛ, i, ɔ, u/ and five nasal vowels /ã, ẽ, ĩ, õ, ũ/. After /k/, in word-initial position, /u/ becomes [ɨ].

== Grammar ==
The language's basic word order has been analyzed as object–subject–verb, a very rare word order among nominative–accusative languages such as Warao.

== Other sources ==
- Boomert, Arie (2000). Trinidad, Tobago, and the lower Orinoco interaction sphere : an archaeological/ethnohistorical study. Internet Archive. [Leiden : Universiteit Leiden]. ISBN 978-90-90-13632-5.
- Osborn Jr, Henry A. (1966b). "Warao II: Nouns, Relationals, and Demonstratives". International Journal of American Linguistics. 32 (3): 253–261. doi:10.1086/464910. S2CID 144134134.
- Rybka, Konrad; Sabogal, Andrés (2025). The future of the Caribbean past: towards a research agenda for contact linguistics.
- Carlin, Eithne B.; van de Kerke, Simon, eds. (2010). Linguistics and Archaeology in the Americas: The Historization of Language and Society. Brill's Studies in the Indigenous Languages of the Americas. Vol. 2. Leiden: Brill.
- Granberry, Julian; Vescelius, Gary S. (2004). Languages of the Pre-Columbian Antilles. Tuscaloosa: University of Alabama Press. ISBN 978-0-8173-5123-6.
- Romero-Figueroa, Andrés (2021). "Los ideófonos en warao". In Orden, María Emilia; Malvestitti, Marisa (eds.). Voces habitadas: Recorridos lingüísticos en homenaje a Ana Fernández Garay. Editorial de la Universidad Nacional de La Pampa. pp. 233–256. ISBN 978-950-863-428-3.
- Barral, Basilio de. 1979. Diccionario Warao-Castellano, Castellano-Warao. Caracas: UCAB
- Figeroa, Andrés Romero. 1997. A Reference Grammar of Warao. München, Newcastle: Lincom
- Ponce, Peter. 2004. Diccionario Español - Warao. Fundación Turismo de Pedernales.
- Vaquero, Antonio. 1965. Idioma Warao. Morfología, sintaxis, literatura. Estudios Venezolanos Indígenas. Caracas.
- Wilbert, Johannes. 1964. Warao Oral Litrerature. Instituto Caribe de Antropología y Sociología. Fundación La Salle de Ciencias Naturales. Monograph no 9 Caracas: Editorial Sucre.
- Wilbert, Johannes. 1969. Textos Folklóricos de los Indios Warao. Los Angeles: Latin American Center. University of California. Latin American Studies Vol. 12.
