= Paragua River =

- Mouth location in Venezuela
- Native name: Rio Paragua (Spanish)

Location
- Country: Venezuela

Physical characteristics
- Mouth
  - coordinates: 6°51′30″N 62°59′15″W

The Paragua River is a river of Venezuela. It is part of the Orinoco River basin. It is the largest tributary of the Caroní River.

The river drains the Guayanan Highlands moist forests ecoregion.

== See also ==
- List of rivers of Venezuela
