= Tupi languages =

Tupi–Guarani language group

Tupi
- Tupi–Guarani subgroup III
- Geographic distribution: South America
- Linguistic classification: Tupian: Tupi–Guarani; Tupi

Language codes
- Glottolog: tupi1287

The Tupí or Tupinambá languages (also known as Tupi–Guarani III) are a subgroup of the Tupi–Guarani language family.

== Languages ==
The Tupi languages are:

- Tupinambá (dialects: Nheengatu a.k.a. Língua Geral as lingua franca)
  - Old Tupi (lingua franca dialect Tupí Austral)
- Cocama–Omagua
