= Harákmbut language =

Indigenous language family with two surviving dialects in Peru

Harákmbut
- aratbuten huaʼa
- Region: Peru
- Ethnicity: 2,090 Harakmbut (2013)
- Native speakers: (2,200 cited 2000–2007)
- Language family: Harákmbut–Katukinan: Harákmbut
- Dialects: Amarakaeri (Arakmbut); Watipaeri; Arasaeri; Pukirieri; Sapiteri; Kisambaeri; Toyoeri †

Language codes
- ISO 639-3: Either: amr – Amarakaeri hug – Huachipaeri
- Glottolog: hara1260
- ELP: Harakmbut
- Linguasphere: 84-GAA
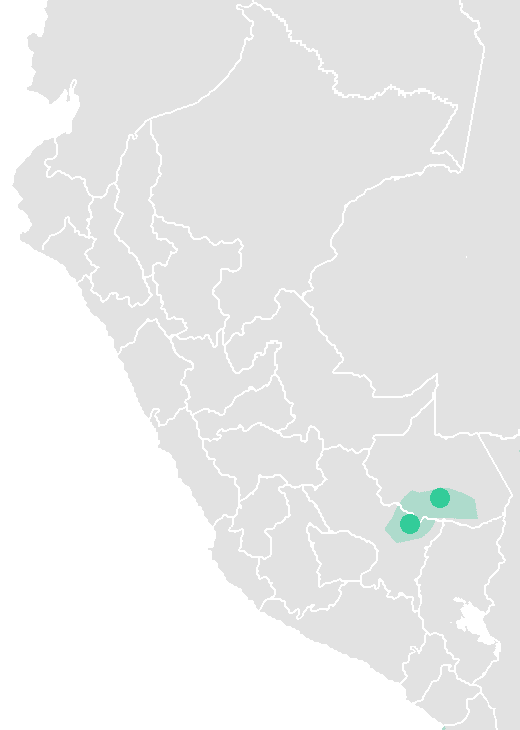
- Amarakaeri (north) and Watipaeri (south). The shadowed area is the probable earlier distribution of the Harakmbut language.

Harákmbut or Harakmbet (stress on the second syllable) is the native language of the Harakmbut people of Peru. It is spoken along the Madre de Dios and Colorado Rivers, in the pre-contact country of the people. There are two dialects that remain vital: Amarakaeri (Arakmbut) and Watipaeri (Huachipaeri), which are reported to be mutually intelligible. The relationship between speakers of the two dialects is hostile.

As of 2012, Amarakaeri is still being learned by children in some communities. There is 5% literacy in Harákmbut compared to 75% literacy in the second language Spanish. They live in the communities of Puerto Luz, Shintuya, San José Del Karene, Barranco Chico, Boca Inambari, Boca Ishiriwe, Puerto Azul, Masenawa and Kotsimba. The name Amarakaeri, from wa-mba-arak-a-eri "murderers", is considered derogatory; the endonym Arakmbut is preferred.

Speakers of Watipaeri (wa-tipa-eri) are mostly concentrated in the indigenous communities of Queros and Santa Rosa de Huacaria, in the Peruvian rainforest. Their members have been experiencing cultural loss, including the complexities of their language, particularly because of the generational gap between the elders and the youth.

== Classification ==
Harakmbut has been accepted as a language isolate since the 1960s. Adelaar (2000, 2007) presents mainly lexical evidence that it is related to the Katukinan family of Brazil; influence from Tupian languages also suggest an origin in Brazil. Campbell (2012) accepted the evidence as "reasonably persuasive". Jolkesky (2011) concurs, and adds Arawan to the family. Glottolog notes "promising lexical links with Katukina [...] with a fair amount of near-identical forms, but the systems of pronouns, numerals or bound morphology show no cognation." Jolkesky (2016) notes that there are lexical similarities with the Pano, Puinave-Nadahup, Tupian, and Arawakan language families due to contact. Similarities with Tupian may be indicative of an earlier origin downstream in the Madeira River interaction sphere.

== Dialects ==
There are six documented dialects of Harákmbut, none of which have more than a handful of remaining fluent speakers.

- Amarakaeri (autonym: Arakmbut), the most widely spoken dialect, is spoken in the indigenous communities of Puerto Luz, Shintuya, San José Del Karene, Barranco Chico, Boca Inambari, Boca Ishiriwe, Puerto Azul, Masenawa, and Kotsimba. There is an ethnic population of 1043 as of 2007.
- Watipaeri, with an ethnic population of 392 in Queros and Santa Rosa de Huacaria
- Arasaeri has an ethnic population of 317 in Arazaeri (arãsã-eri, people of the Marcatapa River; spoken in Arazaeri)
- Pukirieri has an ethnic population of 168 (pukiri-eri, people of the Pukiri River)
- Sapiteri and Kisambaeri (ethnic population of 47, in Barranco Chico)
- Toyoeri: extinct (toyo(dn)-eri, people downriver)

The genetic position of Toyoeri is disputed. Some researchers have divided the dialects into two main groups, with Watipaeri and Toyoeri phonetically and lexically somewhat different from Amarakaeri/Arakmbut, Arasaeri and Sapiteri. Data from Aza (1936) and Peck (1958), however, suggest that Arakmbut is different from the other four, which are similar to each other.

== Phonology ==
Amarakaeri has ten distinct vowels and only nine distinct consonants. When adjacent to /a/, /e/ tends to rise to /i/ or /j/. This can cause palatalization of a preceding consonant, e.g. kate-apo 'why?' as [ˈkatiabɔ] or [ˈkaʧabɔ]. Similarly, /o/ tends to rise to /u/ or /w/ when adjacent to /a/ or /e/, e.g. ĩ-nõ-põ-ẽ-ỹ 'I know' as [ĩˈnɔ̃pwɛ̃j̃].

Vowels
	Front	Central	Back
Close	i ĩ		u ũ
Close-mid	ɛ ɛ̃		ɔ ɔ̃
Open		a ã	

Consonants
	Bilabial	Alveolar	Velar
Nasal	m	n	ŋ
Stop	p	t	k
Fricative		s	
Approximant			w
Flap		ɾ	

The phonemic status of [h] and [ʔ] is not clear. They vary between dialects, but also between speakers and even with the same speaker in Arakmbut. They may be epenthetic consonants used to demarcate syllables that do not have an onset or coda consonant.

Other dialects appear to only differ in the presence of /h/ or the lack of /w/.

/t k n s/ occur in syllable codas, and /ŋ/ only in syllable codas.

Stops tend toward [b d ɡ] in intervocalic position. (In Toyoeri and Sapiteri, this has only been reported for /k/.) Among younger people, and often among their elders, the alveolars /t n/ palatalize to [t͜ʃ] and [ɲ] (or [nd͜ʒ]) before /i, ĩ/; /s/ palatalizes to [ʃ] before /i, ĩ/ and /u, ũ/. (In Toyoeri and Sapiteri, this has only been reported for /t/.)

The nasal consonants have different realizations, depending on whether adjacent vowels are oral or nasal, with /m/ and /n/ affected before an oral vowel, and /n/ and /ŋ/ affected after one:

Nasal allophones
	V_	Ṽ_	_V	_Ṽ
m	m	m	mb	m
n	dn	n	nd	n
ŋ	ɡŋ	ŋ	—	

This allophonic variation is reflected in the community orthography, and the same pattern has been reported for Watipaeri, Arasaeri, Toyoeri and Sapiteri.

The nature of Harakmbut nasality has yet to be fully elucidated, and in Amarakaeri at least there is some free variation of allophones. For instance, 'five' has been attested as both [waˈmaʔnɛ̃ŋ] and [waˈmbaʔnɛ̃ŋ]. Nonetheless, there is a phonemic distinction of vowel nasalization after nasal consonants, as in the proper name /mɔɾimɔ̃/.

Stress is on the penultimate syllable, not counting inflectional suffixes, which do not change stress placement in a word.

== Grammar ==
Noun phrases follow a fixed order of base-case-collective-focus_{1}-focus_{2}. Nouns can take on 11 cases, as well as the collective suffix -(o)mey and the focus suffixes -yo 'only', -nãỹõ, or -nda. The privative denotes lack or absence of the referent.

Harákmbut cases
Case	Form
Nominative/Instrumental	-ʔa, -a
Comitative/Instrumental	-ere
Accusative	-ta(h)
Genitive	-en, -edn, -wedn, -ʔedn
Benefactive	-tewapa
Similative	-oniŋ
Reason	-apo
Privative	-mbayo
Locative	-yo, -ya, -taʔ, -te, -yon, -pen

Pronouns in Harakmbut inflect for person and number. There are two independent demonstrative pronouns: proximal ine and distal kene. When modifying a noun, these become in and ken, respectively. Interrogative pronouns mainly distinguish between human and non-human referents, with mbeʔ 'who/which' being for human referents and kate 'what/which' denoting nonhuman referents. men 'which' may also be used for nonhuman referents. These also serve as the realis indefinite pronouns. Free-choice indefinites, however, add the clitic = piʔ.

Personal pronouns
	Singular	Plural
1	ndoʔ	oroʔ
2	on	opudn
3	ken	

mboerek o-mba-yok-me tareʔ mbeʔ-ta=piʔ
man 3SG.IND-V.PL-give-REC.PST manioc somebody-ACC=INDET
The man gave manioc to whomever

In Harákmbut, there are two main noun classe: free nouns and bound nouns. While free nouns can act as their own lexical items, bound nouns require a prefix. There are two nominalizers, wa- and e-, that derive a free noun from a bound noun. They may derive different semantic meanings from the same root (i.e. wa-mbaʔ 'hand', e-mbaʔ 'leaf'). e- nouns generally derive inalienably possessed nouns, like body parts, plant parts, and landscape parts. Otherwise, nouns are 'bound' to a prefix, which can be a genitive, determiner, demonstrative, interrogative pronouns, or other modifier.

Numerals in Harákmbut, like in many languages, refer to the five-fingered hand as a base.

Cardinal numbers
Numeral	Harákmbut	Gloss
1	noŋ-ti-nda	other-SPAT:up-NDA
2	mbottaʔ	two
3	mbapaʔ	three
4	mbottaʔ-mbottaʔ	two-two
5	wa-mbaʔ-neŋ	NMLZ-hand-amount

Adjectives may be prenominal and prefixed to the noun or postnominal with a nominalizing prefix. While often used in adjectives, it is unclear the exact function of the suffix -nda outside of being a focus marker in the noun phrase.

Verbs in Harákmbut contain four fixed prefix positions and seven fixed suffix positions. The verbal plural marker and spatial markers may be positioned in multiple acceptable places in the prefix. The first prefix is a mood and argument agreement prefix, followed by applicative marking, then the nominal classifier, and finally the socially causative. There are three moods: indicative, dubious, and imperative. Each type agreement and mood has a specific prefix and suffix combination based on the person, its role (Agent or Object), and the mood. After the verbs stem, the suffixes denote the aspect, associated motion, the verbal plural, tense, and transitivity.

Mood and agreement affixes
Agent	Object									
Agent	1SG		2SG		3SG/PL		1PL		2PL	
Agent	IND/DUB	IMP	IND/DUB	IMP	IND/DUB	IMP	IND	IMP	IND	IMP
1SG			o(ʔ)-...-ne	o(ʔ)-...-i	i(ʔ)-...-i	a(ʔ)-...-i			on-...-ne	on-...-i
2SG	o(ʔ)-...-ne	m(b)e(ʔ)-...-ø			i(ʔ)-...-ne	(y)a(ʔ)-...-ø	o(ʔ)-...-ne	m(b)o(ʔ)-~men-...-ne		
3SG	m(b)e(ʔ)-...-ne	m(b)e(ʔ)--eʔ	m(b)e(ʔ)-...-ne	m(b)e(ʔ)-...-eʔ	o(ʔ)-...-ø (indicative) (y)a(ʔ)-...-ø (dubious)	ka(ʔ)-...-eʔ	m(b)o(ʔ)-...-ne	m(b)o(ʔ)-~men-...-ne	m(b)o(ʔ)-...-ne	m(b)o(ʔ)-...-eʔ
1PL			o(ʔ)-...-ne	o(ʔ)-...-i	o(ʔ)-...-i (inclusive) o(ʔ)-...-ne (exclusive)	m(b)o(ʔ)- (dual) mon- (plural)			on-...-ne	on-...-i
2PL	on-...-ne	m(b)o(ʔ)-~men-...-ne			m(b)o(ʔ)-...-ne	(y)an(d)-...-ø	on-...-ne	m(b)o(ʔ)-~men-...-ne		
3PL	men-...-ne	m(b)o(ʔ)-~men-...-ne	m(b)o(ʔ)-...-ne	m(b)o(ʔ)-...-eʔ	on(d)-...-ø (indicative) (y)an(d)-...-ø (dubious)	kan(d)-...-eʔ	m(b)o(ʔ)-...-ne	m(b)o(ʔ)-~men-...-ne	m(b)o(ʔ)-...-ne	m(b)o(ʔ)-...-eʔ

On finite verbs, the future (-apo), present (unmarked), recent past (-me), and distant past (-uy) tenses are distinguished. The indirect evidential marker -(a)te is suffixed after past tense markers. Inferential modality is marked with -ta and epistemic modality with -et. Future possibility is marked by -ipot.

hak-ʔudn-ya o-ti-kot-uy-ate wẽỹ-paʔ-a
house-upper.back-LOC 3SG.IND-SPAT:up-fall-REM-INDIR tree-CLF:rod-NOM
A branch fell on the roof long ago

Verbal pluractionality is marked on verbs, as well as habitual -ika and iterative -e. The perfective aspect marker -a(d)n also codes volitionality (whether an action was performed intentionally), while non-volitionality is marked with -o(d)n. Verbs can be marked with a spatial or associated motion.

The basic word order is Subject-Object-Verb, with occasional Object-Verb-Subject in thetic clauses.

== See also ==
- Macro-Otomakoan languages
- Amarakaeri Communal Reserve

== Bibliography ==
- Aza Martínez, J. P. (1936). Vocabulario español-arasairi. Lima: San Martín y Cía. BACELAR, L. N. (1992). Fonologia preliminar da língua Kanoê. Brasilia: UnB.
- Peck, Ch. (2008 [1979]). Toyeri y Sapiteri: un informe preliminar de la fonología y el vocabulario. (Datos Etno-Lingüísticos, 67). Lima: Ministerio de Educación and Summer Institute of Linguistics.
- Tripp, R. (1995). Diccionario Amarakaeri-Castellano. (Serie Lingüística Peruana, 34). Yarinacocha: Ministerio de Educación / Summer Institute of Linguistics.
- Harakmbut An van linden, "Harakmbut". In Patience Epps and Lev Michael, eds, Amazonian Languages, An International Handbook. De Gruyter Mouton

== Sources ==
- Alain Fabre, 2005, Diccionario etnolingüístico y guía bibliográfica de los pueblos indígenas sudamericanos,
  Harakmbet – Lengua aislada (language isolate) (in Spanish)
