= Harakmbut =

Indigenous people in Peru

Total population
- 2000 (2007 census)

Regions with significant populations
- Peru

Languages
- Harakmbut language and Spanish

Religion
- traditional tribal religion

The Harakmbut (Arakmbut, Harakmbet) are Indigenous people in Peru. They speak the Harakmbut language. An estimated 2,000 Harakmbut people live in the Madre de Dios Region near the Brazilian border in the Peruvian Amazon.

== Amarakaeri ==
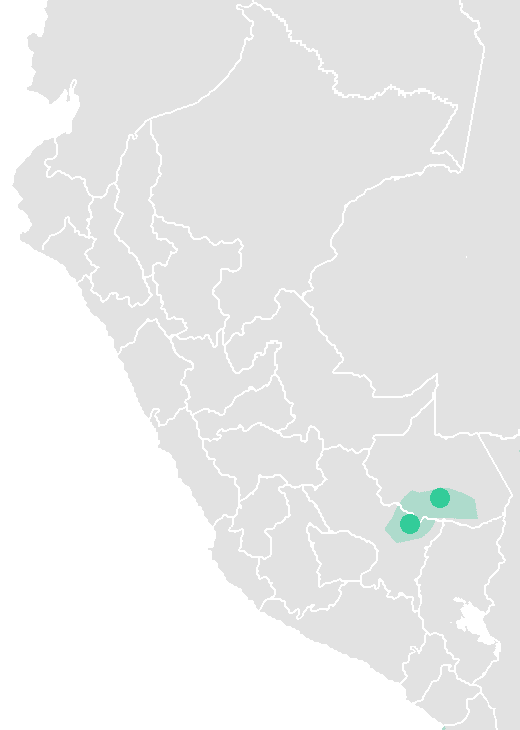
location of Harakmbut

Amarakaeri are also called Amaracaire or Amarakaire people. Subgroups of their tribe include the Kochimberi, Küpondirideri, Wíntaperi, Wakitaneri, and Kareneri peoples. As of 1987, 500 Amarakaeri people lived near the Madre de Dios and Colorado Rivers. Some pan for gold as a means of subsistence. Anthropologist Andrew Gray stated that the Amarakaeri population was under one thousand in 1996. Gray believed that the Amarakaeri's distance from the main stream of the Madre de Dios River may have accounted for their survival.

== Huachipaeri ==
Huachipaeri are also known as Huachipaire or Wachipaeri people. As of 2000, there were 310 Huachipaeri living near the upper Madre de Dios and Keros Rivers. Subgroups of the Huachipaeri including the following, with population figures from 2000:

- Arasairi, population 20
- Manuquiari, population 50
- Puikiri (Puncuri), population 36–50
- Sapiteri, population 12
- Toyeri, population 10

All the subgroups speak dialects of the Huachipaeri language.

== History ==
The Toyeri were originally the largest Harakmbut group however most of them died during the rubber boom from disease, murder, slavery, and other factors. Slave raids into the Madre de Dios and Harakmbut territory from Peruvians began with the development of the Isthmus of Fitzcarrald in 1894. The Toyeri were the first indigenous group that rubber baron Carlos Fitzcarrald encountered on the Manu River. Around two thousand Toyeri natives were massacred by Fitzcarrald's enterprise around 1895 at a location known as El Mirador Grande. Andrew Gray stated that "the use of machine guns caused death on a scale never witnessed in the Peruvian Amazon before." Gray estimated that between 1894 and 1914 the Araseri and Toyeri populations were reduced by 95 percent. Some of the surviving Araseri and Toyeri fled towards the headwaters of the Madre de Dios: this led to a shortage of resources in the headwaters and a great conflict between the Arakmbut and the new migrants. (Note: Gray refers to this conflict as the 'Great War' or 'World War' of the Harakmbut people.) When the Harakmbut were first contacted by members of the Dominican Order in 1940, they numbered 30,000. The development of a road from Cusco into the Madre de Dios coincided with a smallpox epidemic in 1948 which decimated the Huachipaeri population. Andrew Gray stated that the Sapiteri demographic became endangered due to smallpox and influenza outbreaks that occurred post contact with the Dominican missionaries. (Note: Gray also names another Harakmbut tribe, the Kisambaeri / Amaiwaieri, only a few of them survived later epidemics that occurred in the 1950s.)

== Notable people ==
- Q'orianka Kilcher (b. 1990), American actress of Huachipaeri and Quechua descent on her father's side

== See also ==
- Amarakaeri Communal Reserve

== Bibliography ==
- Gray, Andrew (1996). The Arakmbut--mythology, Spirituality, and History. Berghahn Books. ISBN 9781571818768.
- García Hierro, Pedro; Hvalkof, Søren; Gray, Andrew (1998). Liberation through land rights in the Peruvian Amazon. The International Work Group for Indigenous Affairs.
