= List of proposed language families =

The following is a list of proposed language families, which connect established families into larger genetic groups (macro-families). Support for these proposals vary from case to case. For example, the Dené–Yeniseian languages are a recent proposal which has been generally well received, whereas reconstructions of the Proto-World language are often viewed as fringe science. Proposals which are themselves based on other proposals have the likelihood of their parts noted in parentheses.

== Under considerations ==
Proposed name	Proposal	Agree	Disagree	Doubt	Ref.
Alarodian	Alarodian; Hurro-Urartian; Northeast Caucasian	Igor M. Diakonoff (initiator), Sergei Starostin, Petri Kallio	Johanna Nichols, Allan R. Bomhard		
Austric	Austric; Austroasiatic; Austronesian	Wilhelm Schmidt (initiator), La Vaughn H., Lawrence Reid, Gérard Diffloth, Paul Sidwell, Paul K. Benedict (later rejected), Sergei Starostin, John Bengtson, Automated Similarity Judgment Program (database)		Robert Blust, Paul K. Benedict	
Austric	Austric; Austroasiatic; Austronesian; Japonic	Wilhelm Schmidt (initiator)		Robert Blust, Paul K. Benedict	
Austric	Austric; - Austroasiatic; Hmong–Mien; - Austronesian; Kra–Dai	Paul K. Benedict (initiator, later rejected), Sergei Starostin, John Bengtson, Weera Ostapirat (tentative)		Robert Blust, Paul K. Benedict	
Austric	Austric; Ainu; - - Austroasiatic; Hmong–Mien; - Austronesian; Kra–Dai; Nihali	John Bengtson (initiator)		Robert Blust, Paul K. Benedict	
Austro-Tai	Austro-Tai; Austronesian; Kra–Dai	Paul K. Benedict (initiator, also including Japanese), Weera Ostapirat, Alexander Smith	Graham Thurgood	Laurent Sagart	
Aztec–Tanoan	Aztec–Tanoan; Tanoan; Uto-Aztecan				
Chukotko-Kamchatkan–Amuric	Chukotko-Kamchatkan–Amuric; Chukotko-Kamchatkan; Nivkh				
Dene–Yeniseian	Dene–Yeniseian; Na-Dene; Yeniseian	Alfredo Trombetti (initiator), Merritt Ruhlen, Edward Vajda, Michael Krauss, Jeff Leer, James Kari, Heinrich Werner, Bernard Comrie, Johanna Nichols, Victor Golla, Michael Fortescue, Eric Hamp, Bill Poser, and Paul Kiparsky	Georgiy Starostin (Vajda's proposal)	Lyle Campbell	
Gulf	Gulf; Atakapa; Chitimacha; Muskogean; Natchez; Tunica				
Hokan	Hokan; Chimariko; Coahuilteco; Comecrudan; Esselen; Jicaquean; Karuk; - Palaihnihan; Shastan; Pomoan; Salinan; Seri; Tequistlatecan; Washo; Yana; Yuman–Cochimí				
Indo-Uralic	Indo-Uralic; Indo-European; Uralic	Holger Pedersen (initiator), Kortlandt, Hannes Sköld, Alwin Kloekhorst, and Nikolai Dmitrievich Andreev	Christian Carpelan, Asko Parpola, Petteri Koskikallio, and Johan Schalin		
Indo-Uralic	Indo-Uralic; Indo-European; - Uralic–Yukaghir; Uralic; Yukaghir	Kortlandt (initiator)	Christian Carpelan, Asko Parpola, Petteri Koskikallio, and Johan Schalin		
Japonic-Koreanic	Japonic-Koreanic; Japonic; Koreanic	John Whitman, Alexander Takenobu Frances-Ratte, Samuel E. Martin		Alexander Vovin	
Je–Tupi–Carib	Je–Tupi–Carib; Cariban; - Macro-Jê; Bororoan; Jaikó; Jê; Kamakã; Karajá; Kariri; Krenak; Maxakalían; Ofayé; Purian; Rikbaktsa; Yabutian; Tupian				
Karasuk	Karasuk; Burushaski; Yeniseian				
Macro-Chibchan	Macro-Chibchan; Chibchan; Lencan; Misumalpan				
Macro-Pama–Nyungan	Macro-Pama–Nyungan; Garawan; Macro-Gunwinyguan; Pama–Nyungan; Tangkic				
Macro-Panoan	Macro-Panoan; - Moseten–Chonan; Chimane; Chonan; - Pano-Tacanan; Panoan; Tacanan				
Macro-Siouan	Macro-Siouan; Caddoan; Iroquoian; Siouan; Yuchi				
Mataco–Guaicuru	Mataco–Guaicuru; Guaicuruan; Matacoan; Mascoian; Charruan; Guachi; Payagua				
Miao–Dai	Miao–Dai; Hmong–Mien; Kra–Dai	Ryuichi Kosaka (initiator)			
Niger–Congo	Niger–Congo; Atlantic–Congo; Dogon; Ijaw; Katloid; Mande; Rashad				
Nilo-Saharan	Nilo-Saharan; Kuliak; Saharan; - - Bʼaga; Eastern Sudanic; Kadu; Koman; - Berta; Central Sudanic; Fur; Kunama; Maban; Songhay				
North Caucasian	North Caucasian; Northeast Caucasian; Northwest Caucasian				
Penutian	Penutian; Chinookan; Plateau Penutian; Takelma; Kalapuyan; - Alsean; Siuslaw; Coosan; Wintuan; Maiduan; Yok-Utian; Tsimshianic				
Pontic	Pontic; Indo-European; Northwest Caucasian	Émile Benveniste, Winfred P. Lehmann, Aert Kuipers, and John Colarusso			
Quechumaran	Quechumaran; Aymaran; Quechuan				
Sino-Austronesian	Sino-Austronesian; - Austronesian; Kra–Dai; Sino-Tibetan	Laurent Sagart (initiator), Stanley Starosta	Weera Ostapirat, Alexander Vovin, George van Driem	Paul Jen-kuei Li and Robert Blust	
Tequiraca-Canichana	Tequiraca–Canichana; Aʔɨwa; Canichana	Terrence Kaufman (initiator)			
Totozoquean	Totozoquean; Chitimacha; Mixe–Zoque; Totonacan				
Uralic–Yukaghir	Uralic–Yukaghir; Uralic; Yukaghir				
Uralo-Siberian	Uralo-Siberian; Eskaleut; - Uralic–Yukaghir; Uralic; Yukaghir	Michael Fortescue (initiator), Frederik Kortlandt			
Uralo-Siberian	Uralo-Siberian; Eskaleut; Nivkh; - Uralic–Yukaghir; Uralic; Yukaghir	Frederik Kortlandt (initiator)			
Yok-Utian	Yok-Utian; Utian; Yokuts	Geoffrey Gamble (initiator), Catherine Callaghan			

== Widely rejected ==
Below are language families that are already rejected by most linguists. As they are widely rejected, only linguists who agree are shown.

Proposed name	Proposal	Status	Agree	Ref.
Almosan	Almosan; Algic; Kutenai; - Mosan; Chimakuan; Salishan; Wakashan	Widely rejected	Joseph Greenberg, Georgiy Starostin, Ilia Peiros, Murray Gell-Mann	
Amerind	Amerind; - Almosan ⊞; Algic; Kutenai; - Mosan; Chimakuan; Salishan; Wakashan ⊟; - Keresiouan ⊞; Caddoan; Iroquoian; Keres; - Siouan–Yuchi; Siouan; Yuchi ⊟; - Penutian ⊞; Tsimshianic; Chinookan; - Oregon Penutian; Kalapuyan; Takelma; - Coast Oregon Penutian; Alsean; Siuslaw; Coosan; - Plateau Penutian; Waiilatpuan; Cayuse; Molala; Klamath; Sahaptian; - California Penutian; Maiduan; Utian; Wintuan; Yokuts; Zuni; - Gulf; Atakapa; Chitimacha; Muskogean; Natchez; Tunica; Yuki–Wappo; - Mexican Penutian; Huave; Mayan; Mixe–Zoque; Totonacan ⊟; - Hokan ⊞; - Northern Hokan; - Karok‑Shasta; Karuk; Chimariko; - Shasta‑Achomawi; Shastan; Palaihnihan; Yana; Pomoan; Washo; - Salinan‑Chumash; Salinan; Chumashan; Esselen; - Seri‑Yuman; Seri; Yuman–Cochimí; - Waicuri‑Quinigua; Waikuri; Quinigua; Maratino; - Coahuiltecan; Tonkawa; Karankawa; - Coahuiltecan proper; Coahuilteco; Cotoname; Comecrudo; Tequistlatecan; Supanecan; Jicaquean; Yurumanguí ⊟; - Central Amerind ⊞; Tanoan; Uto-Aztecan; Oto-Manguean ⊟; - Macro-Chibchan ⊞; Cuitlatec; Lencan; Chibchan; Pech; Purépecha; Xincan; Yanomaman; Cañari–Puruhá ⊟; - Macro-Paezan ⊞; Huarpean; Kunza; Betoi–Jirara; - Chimu; Quingnam; Mochica; Itonama; Jirajaran; - Mura-Matanawi; Mura; Matanawi; - Nuclear Paezan; Andaqui; Barbacoan; Chocoan; - Páez–Coconucan; Coconuco; Guanaca; Páez; Timucua; Warao ⊟; - Andean ⊞; Aymaran; - Itucale‑Sabela; Urarina; Omurano; Wao Terero; - Cahuapana‑Zaparo; Cahuapanan; Zaparoan; - Northern Andean; Tallán; Hibito–Cholon; Culli; Leco; Sechura; Quechuan; - Southern Andean; Alacalufan; Araucanian; Gününa Küne; Chonan; Yahgan ⊟; - Macro‑Tucanoan ⊞; Aewa; Canichana; Kanoê; Katukinan; Gamela; Aikanã; Irantxe; - Arutani–Sape; Arutani; Sapé; Máku; Kwaza; Movima; Muniche; Nambikwaran; Natú; Pankararú; - Puinave–Makú; Nadahup; Puinave; - - Nukak; Kakua; Hodï; Xukuruan; - Ticuna–Yuri; Ticuna; Yurí; Tucanoan; Uamué ⊟; - Equatorial ⊞; - Macro‑Arawakan; Guajiboan; Katembri; Otomákoan; Tiniguan; - Arawakan; Arawan; Maipuran; Chapacuran; Guamo; Uru–Chipaya; Cayubaba; Kamëntšá; - Jivaro‑Kandoshi; Cofán; Esmeraldeño; Chicham; Candoshi-Shapra; Pumé; - Kariri‑Tupi; Kariri; Tupian; Piaroa–Saliban; Taruma; Timote; Trumai; Tuxá; Yuracaré; Zamucoan ⊟; - Macro‑Carib ⊞; Andoque; - Bora–Witoto; Boran; Witotoan; Cariban; Kukurá; Peba–Yaguan ⊟; - Macro‑Panoan ⊞; Charruan; Mascoian; Lule–Vilela; - Mataco–Guaicuru; Guaicuruan; Mataguayan; Mosetén–Chimane; - Pano-Tacanan; Panoan; Tacanan ⊟; - Macro-Jê ⊞; Bororoan; Krenak; Karajá; Chiquitano; Rikbaktsa; Yatê; Jê; Guató; Kamakã; Maxakalían; Ofayé; Oti; Puri; Yabutian ⊟	Rejected	Joseph Greenberg (initiator), Merritt Ruhlen	
Altaic	Altaic; Mongolic; Tungusic; Turkic	Widely rejected; generally considered a Sprachbund		
Altaic	Altaic; - Mongolic; Turkic; - Tungusic	Widely rejected; generally considered a Sprachbund		
Austronesian–Ongan	Austronesian–Ongan; Austronesian; Ongan	Widely rejected	Juliette Blevins (initiator)	
Borean	Borean; Afroasiatic; Kartvelian; Dravidian; - - Sumerian; Elamite; Hurro-Urartian; Hattic; - Eurasiatic; Etruscan; Indo-European; - Uralic–Yukaghir; Uralic; Yukaghir; - Altaic; Mongolic; Tungusic; Turkic; - Korean–Japanese–Ainu; Koreanic; Japonic; Ainu; Nivkh; Chukotko-Kamchatkan; Eskaleut; - Vasco‑Caucasic; Basque; - North Caucasian; Northwest Caucasian; Northeast Caucasian; - Karasuk; Burushaski; Yeniseian; Sino-Tibetan; Na-Dene; - Amerind ⊞; - Almosan ⊞; Algic; Kutenai; - Mosan; Chimakuan; Salishan; Wakashan ⊟; - Keresiouan ⊞; Caddoan; Iroquoian; Keres; - Siouan–Yuchi; Siouan; Yuchi ⊟; - Penutian ⊞; Tsimshianic; Chinookan; - Oregon Penutian; Kalapuyan; Takelma; - Coast Oregon Penutian; Alsean; Siuslaw; Coosan; - Plateau Penutian; Waiilatpuan; Cayuse; Molala; Klamath; Sahaptian; - California Penutian; Maiduan; Utian; Wintuan; Yokuts; Zuni; - Gulf; Atakapa; Chitimacha; Muskogean; Natchez; Tunica; Yuki–Wappo; - Mexican Penutian; Huave; Mayan; Mixe–Zoque; Totonacan ⊟; - Hokan ⊞; - Northern Hokan; - Karok‑Shasta; Karuk; Chimariko; - Shasta‑Achomawi; Shastan; Palaihnihan; Yana; Pomoan; Washo; - Salinan‑Chumash; Salinan; Chumashan; Esselen; - Seri‑Yuman; Seri; Yuman–Cochimí; - Waicuri‑Quinigua; Waikuri; Quinigua; Maratino; - Coahuiltecan; Tonkawa; Karankawa; - Coahuiltecan proper; Coahuilteco; Cotoname; Comecrudo; Tequistlatecan; Supanecan; Jicaquean; Yurumanguí ⊟; - Central Amerind ⊞; Tanoan; Uto-Aztecan; Oto-Manguean ⊟; - Macro-Chibchan ⊞; Cuitlatec; Lencan; Chibchan; Pech; Purépecha; Xincan; Yanomaman; Cañari–Puruhá ⊟; - Macro-Paezan ⊞; Huarpean; Kunza; Betoi–Jirara; - Chimu; Quingnam; Mochica; Itonama; Jirajaran; - Mura-Matanawi; Mura; Matanawi; - Nuclear Paezan; Andaqui; Barbacoan; Chocoan; - Páez–Coconucan; Coconuco; Guanaca; Páez; Timucua; Warao ⊟; - Andean ⊞; Aymaran; - Itucale‑Sabela; Urarina; Omurano; Wao Terero; - Cahuapana‑Zaparo; Cahuapanan; Zaparoan; - Northern Andean; Tallán; Hibito–Cholon; Culli; Leco; Sechura; Quechuan; - Southern Andean; Alacalufan; Araucanian; Gününa Küne; Chonan; Yahgan ⊟; - Macro‑Tucanoan ⊞; Aewa; Canichana; Kanoê; Katukinan; Gamela; Aikanã; Irantxe; - Arutani–Sape; Arutani; Sapé; Máku; Kwaza; Movima; Muniche; Nambikwaran; Natú; Pankararú; - Puinave–Makú; Nadahup; Puinave; - - Nukak; Kakua; Hodï; Xukuruan; - Ticuna–Yuri; Ticuna; Yurí; Tucanoan; Uamué ⊟; - Equatorial ⊞; - Macro‑Arawakan; Guajiboan; Katembri; Otomákoan; Tiniguan; - Arawakan; Arawan; Maipuran; Chapacuran; Guamo; Uru–Chipaya; Cayubaba; Kamëntšá; - Jivaro‑Kandoshi; Cofán; Esmeraldeño; Chicham; Candoshi-Shapra; Pumé; - Kariri‑Tupi; Kariri; Tupian; Piaroa–Saliban; Taruma; Timote; Trumai; Tuxá; Yuracaré; Zamucoan ⊟; - Macro‑Carib ⊞; Andoque; - Bora–Witoto; Boran; Witotoan; Cariban; Kukurá; Peba–Yaguan ⊟; - Macro‑Panoan ⊞; Charruan; Mascoian; Lule–Vilela; - Mataco–Guaicuru; Guaicuruan; Mataguayan; Mosetén–Chimane; - Pano-Tacanan; Panoan; Tacanan ⊟; - Macro-Jê ⊞; Bororoan; Krenak; Karajá; Chiquitano; Rikbaktsa; Yatê; Jê; Guató; Kamakã; Maxakalían; Ofayé; Oti; Puri; Yabutian ⊟ ⊟	Widely rejected	Harold C. Fleming (initiator), Sergei Starostin, Murray Gell-Mann, John Bengtson	
Coahuiltecan	Native languages of modern Texas	Sprachbund		
Dené–Caucasian	Dené–Caucasian; - Eastern; Sino-Tibetan; Na-Dene; - Western; - - Yeniseian; Burushaski; - - - North Caucasian; Northeast Caucasian; Northwest Caucasian; Basque	Widely rejected	John Bengtson, George Starostin, Sergei Starostin	
Dravido-Korean	Dravido-Korean; Dravidian; Koreanic	Obsolete	Susumu Ōno	
Elamo-Dravidian	Elamo-Dravidian; Dravidian; Elamite	Widely rejected	David W. McAlpin, Franklin Southworth	
Eurasiatic	Eurasiatic; Etruscan; Indo-European; - Uralic–Yukaghir; Uralic; Yukaghir; - Altaic; Mongolic; Tungusic; Turkic; - Korean–Japanese–Ainu; Koreanic; Japonic; Ainu; Nivkh; Chukotko-Kamchatkan; Eskaleut	Widely rejected	Mark Pagel, Joseph Greenberg, Merritt Ruhlen	
Ibero-Caucasian	Ibero-Caucasian; Kartvelian; Northeast Caucasian; Northwest Caucasian	Widely rejected	Arnold Chikobava (Initiator)	
Indo-Pacific	Several Pacific families.	Widely rejected	Joseph Greenberg (initiator)	
Indo-Semitic	Indo-Semitic; Indo-European; Semitic	Widely rejected	Graziadio Isaia Ascoli (initiator)	
Japhetic	Japhetic; Basque; Kartvelian; Semitic	Widely rejected	Nikolai Marr (initiator)	
Khoisan	Khoisan; Hadza; Khoe–Kwadi; Kxʼa; Sandawe; Tuu	Widely rejected	Joseph Greenberg (initiator)	
Macro-Mayan	Macro-Mayan; Huave; Mayan; Mixe–Zoque; Totonacan	Widely rejected		
Mosan	Mosan; Chimakuan; Salishan; Wakashan	Sprachbund		
Nostratic	Nostratic; Afroasiatic; Kartvelian; Dravidian; - Eurasiatic; Indo-European; Uralic; - Altaic; Mongolic; Tungusic; Turkic	Widely rejected	Vladimir Dybo	
Sino-Uralic	Sino-Uralic; Sinitic; Uralic	Widely rejected	Jingyi Gao (initiator)	
Transeurasian	Transeurasian; Altaic; - Mongolic; Turkic; - Tungusic; Japano‑Koreanic; - - Japonic; Koreanic	Widely rejected	Martine Robbeets, Remco Bouckaert	
Ural–Altaic	Ural–Altaic; - Altaic; Mongolic; Tungusic; Turkic; Uralic	Obsolete; considered a linguistic convergence zone		

== See also ==
- List of language families
- Macrofamily
