= Juris =

Tribe of Indigenous people, formerly in present-day northwestern Brazil

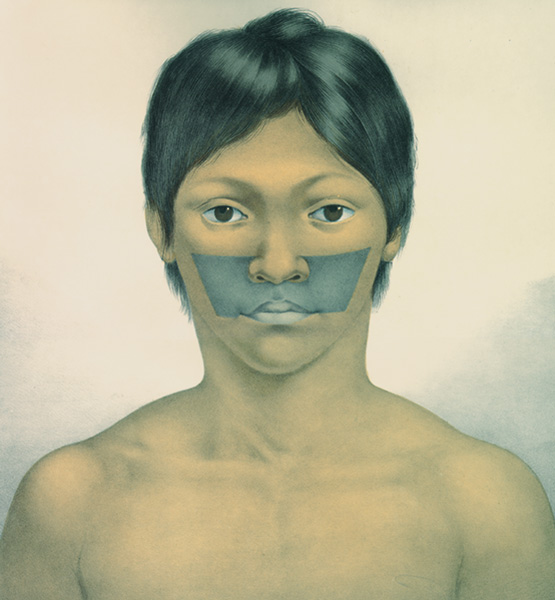
- Drawing of a juri man from 1823 in Reiseatlas von Spix und Martius.

Total population
- ? in Brazil, ? in Colombia

Languages
- Yuri

Religion
- Indigenous beliefs

Related ethnic groups
- Passes (or Pasé)

The Juris (also Juri, Yuri) were a tribe of South American Indigenous people, formerly occupying the country between the rivers Içá (lower Putumayo) and Yapura, north-western Brazil. In ancient days they were the most powerful tribe of the district, but in 1820 their numbers did not exceed 2000. Owing to inter-marrying, the Juris are believed to have been extinct for half a century. They were closely related to the Passes, and were like them a fair-skinned, finely built people with quite European features.

== Language ==
Data on the Yuri language (Jurí) was collected on two occasions in the 19th century, in 1853 and 1867. The american linguist Terrence Kaufman notes that there is good lexical evidence to support a link with Ticuna in a Ticuna–Yurí language family (1994:62, after Nimuendajú 1977:62), though the data has never been explicitly compared (Hammarström 2010).

== Relation to Carabayo ==
It is commonly assumed that the Juri people and their language has survived among the uncontacted people or peoples of the Rio Puré region. The name "Yuri" is often used as a synonym for the only named people in the area, the Carabayo in Colombia. A list of words collected in 1969 from the Carabayo, only recovered in 2013, suggests the language is close to Yuri, though perhaps not a direct descendant.
