= Ticuna =

Indigenous people of Brazil

Tukuna
Magüta
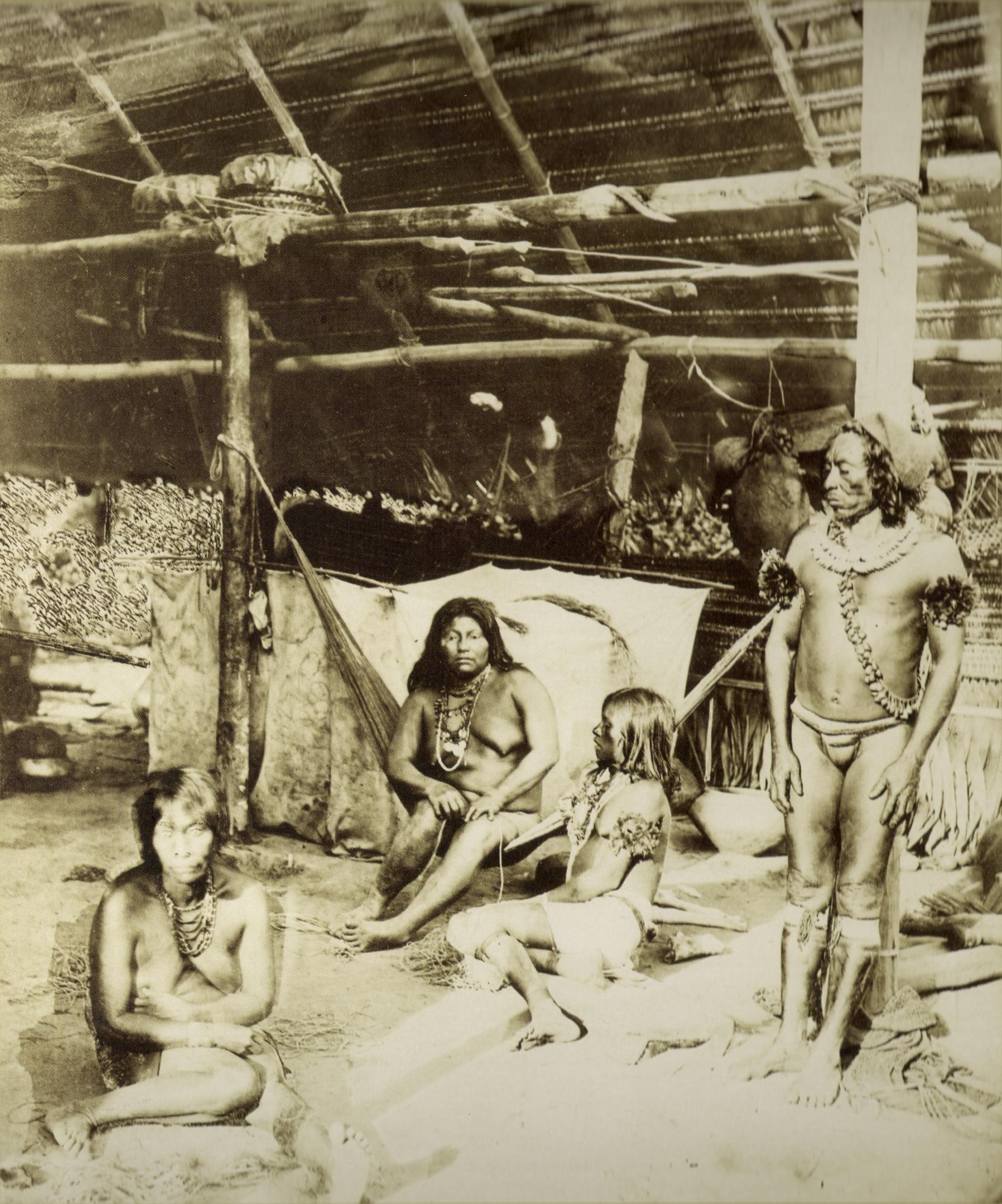
- Ticuna people in Amazonas, Brazil, c. 1865, by Albert Frisch.

Regions with significant populations
- Brazil (Amazonas): 74,601 (2022)
- Colombia: 8,000 (2011)
- Peru: 6,982 (2007)

Languages
- Ticuna

Religion
- Shamanism, Christianity

The Ticuna (also Magüta, Tucuna, Tikuna, or Tukuna, Ticuna: Magüta) are an Indigenous people of Brazil, Colombia, and Peru. They are the most numerous tribe in the Brazilian Amazon. According to the 2022 Brazilian census, 74,601 Ticuna people live in Brazil, making them the most populous Indigenous group in the country.

== History ==
Ticuna were originally a tribe that lived far away from the rivers and whose expansion was kept in check by neighboring people. Their historical lack of access to waterways and their practice of endogamy has led to the Ticuna being culturally and genetically distinct from other Amazonian tribes. The first contact with outsiders occurred on the colonization of Brazil when a Portuguese fleet exploring the Amazon came into contact with the Ticuna. Sustained contact with the Portuguese and other outsiders began in 1649. Since the Ticuna lived relatively inland compared to other tribes they were less affected by the diseases and violence caused by colonialism, hence why the Ticuna today have the largest population of any Amazonian people. When the Europeans initiated warfare with the neighboring tribes, their land, which consisted islands and coastal areas, was available to the Ticuna. However, the Ticuna still suffered greatly, especially in the rubber cultivation that began in the late 19th century where many Ticuna were used for slave labor.

Ticuna as a Brazilian tribe has faced violence from loggers, fishermen, and rubber-tappers entering their lands around the Solimões River. Brazil and Paraguay were in a war between 1864–1870, and the Ticuna chose to fight in that war. This depleted their population and the Ticuna were forced out of their Brazilian territories. Four Ticuna people were murdered, 19 were wounded, and 10 had disappeared in the 1988 Helmet massacre. By the 1990s, Brazil formally recognized the Ticunas' right to their lands, thus protecting the Ticuna people, as well as decreasing conflict in the surrounding areas.

== Language ==
Ticuna people speak the Ticuna language, which is usually identified as a language isolate, although it might possibly be related to the extinct Yuri language thus forming the hypothetical Ticuna–Yuri grouping. The Ticuna language was once thought to be an Arawakan language, but this has now been discredited as more likely the Ticuna have adopted many linguistic features due to a long history of interaction with Arawakan-speaking tribes. It is written in the Latin script.

== Religion and rituals ==
Ticuna people historically practiced shamanism, although with the influence of Christian missionaries since contact, Shamans have become rare in all but the most isolated communities. Ta'e was the Ticuna creator god who guarded the earth, while Yo'i and Ip were mythical heroes in Ticuna folklore who helped fight off demons. Depending on different estimates, some say that the Ticuna primarily practice ethnic religion, while other estimates say that 30% to 90% are Christian.

The Ticuna practice a coming-of-age ceremony for girls when they reach puberty called a pelazon. After the girl's first menstruation, her whole body is painted black with the clan symbol drawn on her head. All their hair is pulled out and they wear a dress custom-made from eagle feathers and snail shells. The girl then must continuously jump over a fire. After four days, the girl is considered a woman and is eligible for marriage. Ticuana men and women must marry outside their own clans according to customs. Nowadays, the ritual is shorter and less intense as it was historically.

== Marriage patterns ==
The Ticuna follow the rules of exogamy, in which members of the same moiety are not permitted to marry. In the past, it was common practice for a maternal uncle to marry his niece. Today, however, marriage generally occurs within the same generation. Due to the influence of Catholic missionaries, cross-cousin marriages and polygyny, which were acceptable and common in the past, are no longer viewed as permissible practices. Divorce is permissible, but infrequent.

== Modern day ==
Today, most Ticuna people dress in western clothing and only wear their traditional garments made out of tree bark and practice their ceremonies on special occasions or for tourists. Most Ticuna nowadays are fluent in Portuguese or Spanish depending on the country in which they live, and mostly use Spanish and Portuguese names. Poverty and lack of education are persistent problems in most Ticuna communities, leading to government and NGO efforts to increase educational and academic opportunities. In December 1986, the General Organization of Bilingual Ticuna Teachers (or OGPTB in its Portuguese/Spanish abbreviation) was founded in order to provide Ticuna children with quality bilingual education and more opportunities. In 1998, there were only around 7,400 ethnic Ticuna children enrolled in elementary school; by, 2005 the number had more than doubled to 16,100. Another goal of the OGPTB was the gradual replacement of non-Indigenous teachers with Ticuna ones for Ticuna students to better provide bilingual education. By 2005, over half of the teachers were ethnic Ticuna. So effective has the OGPTB program been that it is now being expanded and copied to better serve the educational needs of other indigenous people in Brazil and Colombia.

The Ticuna are also coming under increasing influence of evangelization and proselytism by Christian missionaries, which has impacted the Ticuna way of life. Catholic, Baptist, Presbyterian, and Evangelical missionaries are all active among the Ticuna; sometimes the missionaries are ethnic Ticuna themselves.

== Notable Ticuna people ==
- Djuena Tikuna (born 1984), singer
- Weena Tikuna (born 1988), artist and model
