= Timote (disambiguation) =

Timote is a locality in Carlos Tejedor County, Buenos Aires Province, Argentina.

Timote may also refer to:

- Timote language, spoken by the Timote people
- Timotean languages, of which the Timote language is one
- Timote people, in the Venezuelan Andes
- Timote Gabashvili (1703–1764), Georgian travel writer, traveler, diplomat, cartographer, religious and public figure
- Timote Moleni (born 1975), Tongan footballer
- Timote "Junior" Tafuna, American football player
