= Mosetén–Chimane language =

Language of the western Bolivian lowlands

Chimane
- Tsimané, Mosetén, Tsimaneʼ
- tsinsimik tsunsi’ĉan
- Pronunciation: /tsint'si mik/ /tsɨnt'siʔkhan/
- Native to: Bolivia
- Region: western Amazon
- Ethnicity: Tsimané
- Native speakers: 5,300 (2004)
- Language family: Moseten–Chonan?: Chimane
- Dialects: Tsimaneʼ (90%); Santa Ana Mosetén; Covendo Mosetén

Official status
- Official language in: Bolivia

Language codes
- ISO 639-3: cas
- Glottolog: mose1249
- ELP: Mosetén
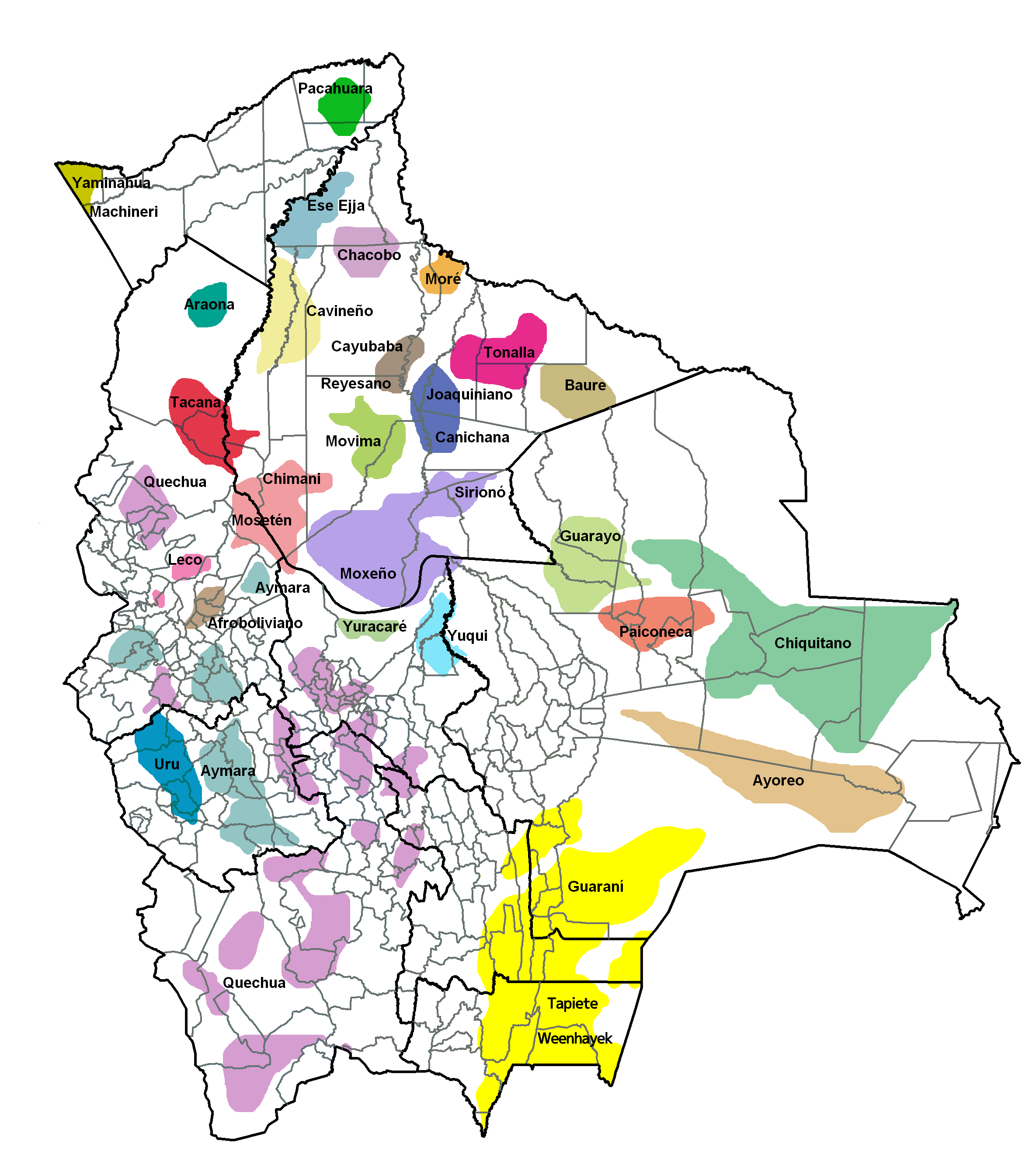
- Mosetén-Chimané

- Mosetén is classified as Severely Endangered by the UNESCO Atlas of the World's Languages in Danger. Chimané is classified as Vulnerable by the UNESCO Atlas of the World's Languages in Danger.

Chimané (Tsimaneʼ) and Mosetén are dialects of a South American language isolate. Mosetén is further divided into Mosetén of Santa Ana and Mosetén of Covendo. Chimane is a language of the western Bolivian lowlands spoken by the Tsimane peoples along the Beni River and the region around San Borja in the Department of Beni (Bolivia). Sakel (2004) classifies them as two languages for a number of reasons, yet some of the variants of the language are mutually intelligible and they reportedly have no trouble communicating and were evidently a single language separated recently through cultural contact (Campbell 2000).

== Status ==
The dialects of Tsimaneʼ are in different sociolinguistic situations. Covendo Mosetén has around 600 speakers, while Santa Ana Mosetén only has around 150-200 speakers. Both of these dialects are fading quickly, and almost all speakers of these dialects are bilingual in Spanish. Only older speakers maintain use of the language without Spanish influence. Tsimaneʼ proper, on the other hand, has at least 4,000 speakers, and the number of speakers is growing. In addition, the majority of speakers of Tsimaneʼ proper are monolingual. The Mosetén were in contact with missions for almost 200 years, while the Tsimaneʼ have remained isolated for much longer, thus leading the Tsimaneʼ to preserve their customs and traditions, including language, much more than the Mosetén.

== Classification ==
Mosetenan has no obvious relatives among the languages of South America. There is some lexicon shared with Puquina and the Uru–Chipaya languages, but these appear to be borrowings. Morris Swadesh suggested a Moseten–Chon relationship, which Suárez provided evidence for in the 1970s, and with which Kaufman (1990) is sympathetic.

== Dialects ==
Dialects listed by Mason (1950):

- Chimane dialects
  - Moseten
    - Amo
    - Aparono
    - Cunana
    - Chumpa
    - Magdaleno
    - Punnucana
    - Rache
    - Muchanes
    - Tucupi
  - Chimane
    - Chimaniza
    - Chumano
    - Nawazi-Monlji

Tsimane’ /tsi'maneʔ/ and Mosetén /mose'ten/ are self-designations that refer to both the language and ethnic group. Chimanes also refer to their language as tsunsi’ĉan /tsɨnt'siʔkhan/ ‘in our (language)’, while Mosetenes also refer to their language as tsinsi’ mik /tsint'si mik/ ‘our language’. As a dialect continuum, dialects of Chimane-Mosetén include Covendo Mosetén (500–800 speakers), spoken in the village of Covendo; Santa Ana Mosetén (150–200 speakers); and Chimane (12,500–15,000 speakers). Covendo is a more remote village that is predominantly ethnic Mosetén, while Santa Ana Mosetén (located between Covendo Mosetén and Chimane) is spoken in Santa Ana, which has many Spanish speakers who have moved from other parts of Bolivia. Chimane is still vigorously spoken, while Mosetén is highly endangered.

== Language contact ==
Jolkesky (2016) notes that there are lexical similarities with the Uru-Chipaya, Yurakare, and Pano language families due to contact.

== Phonology ==
Tsimaneʼ has 5 vowels:

Vowels
	Front	Central	Back
Close	i		
Close-mid	e		o
Mid		ə	
Open		a	

Tsimaneʼ has 24 consonants:

Consonants
		Labial	Alveolar		Post-alv./ Palatal	Velar	Glottal
		Labial	plain	pal.	Post-alv./ Palatal	Velar	Glottal
Nasal		m	n		ɲ		
Plosive	voiceless	p	t	tʲ		k	ʔ
Plosive	voiced	b	d	dʲ			
Plosive	aspirated	pʰ				kʰ	
Affricate	plain		t͡s		t͡ʃ		
Affricate	aspirated		t͡sʰ		t͡ʃʰ		
Fricative		f	s		ʃ		h
Approximant		ʋ			j		
Trill			r				

== Writing system ==
Chimane has been written since 1980 in a Spanish-based alphabet devised by Wayne Gill. It uses the additional letters ṕ, ć, q́u, tś, ćh, mʼ, nʼ, ä. It is widely used in publications and is taught in Chimane schools.

In 1996, Colette Grinevald created an alphabet for Moseten and Chimane which used only those letters found on a Spanish keyboard. It included the multigraphs ph khdh ch chh tsh dh, and was adopted by the Moseten.

Bolivian Law 3603 of 2007 Jan 17 recognizes the rights of the Chimane and Moseten to their language in all aspects of life in Bolivia, including education, and Chimane translation of policy which concerns them, and that written Chimane must use the unique Chimane(-Moseten) alphabet. However, it does not clarify which alphabet this is.
