= Muneo Tokunaga =

- Born: January 1, 1945; Japan Osaka
- Died: August 1, 2016 (aged 71); Kyoto
- Other name: 徳永 宗雄
- Occupation: Indologist

Muneo Tokunaga (徳永 宗雄, Tokunaga Muneo) was a Japanese Indologist. A graduate of the doctoral program of Harvard University, he taught in the Indology Department of Kyoto University.

== Biography ==
Tokunaga was a specialist in Sanskrit and the Vedas and was also one of the world's foremost authorities on Indian languages. He was an authority on Indian epics, and in 1994 provided the world with the first digital, searchable text, in ASCII format, of the Mahabharata, based on the Poona Critical Edition. This has now been revised by John D. Smith. Tokunaga also transcribed the other Indian epic, the Ramayana, based on the Baroda Critical Edition, which also afforded Smith the basis for his revised digital version. He was a severe critic of the theories of Susumu Ōno linking the Japanese and Tamil languages.

== Links ==
- CiNii-Tokunaga Muneo (books)
