= Ōno's lexical law =

Statistical law in Japanese

Ōno's lexical law, or simply Ōno's law, is a statistical law for the varying rate that four word classes that appear in the lexicon of classical Japanese literary works. The law was discovered by Japanese linguist Susumu Ōno and published in 1956.

== Summary ==
The law states that, for the nine literary works under consideration (one work is in two editions, hence ten manuscripts total), the percentage of words in each of the four given word classes vary simultaneously linearly, between the most noun-heavy Man'yōshū and the most verb-heavy Tale of Genji. The four word classes are nouns, verbs, adjectives, and adjectival nouns, with nouns and verbs being the bulk of the words. If there were only two word classes, this statement would be trivial: as one word class (say, nouns) decreases, the other (say, verbs) increases by exactly the corresponding amount. However, what the law observes is that as use of nouns decreases, use of verbs and adjectives and adjectival nouns increases, and that these increase by approximately constant proportions (hence linear).

The horizontal axis (in Ōno's formulation) is arbitrary, and should not be interpreted as time. The graph in the re-formulation by Mizutani is more easily interpreted, and shows a scatter plot of nouns versus other word classes.

== Ōno's lexical law (original version) ==
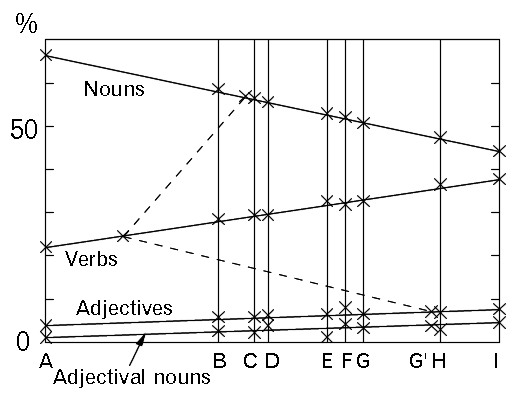
Fig.1 Rates of word classes in Japanese classical literary works.

Obtain the rates of usage for four word classes: nouns, verbs, adjectives, and adjectival noun for Man'yōshū and Genji Monogatari. Plot the rates of the four word classes for the Man'yōshū on the y-axis. Then plot the rates for the Genji Monogatari on a vertical line to the right. Connecting the two points for the noun reveals a monotonically decreasing line, while connecting the two points for any of the other word classes results in a monotonically increasing line. Plot an additional point corresponding to any of the other seven classic works on each line of the word classes. This reveals that any of those new point sets for one of the additional works on different lines of word classes is located approximately on a different vertical line.

Symbols for the Japanese classical literary works in Fig. 1.
Symbols	Literatures
A	Man'yōshū
B	Tsurezuregusa
C	Hōjōki
D	Makura no sōshi
E	Tosa nikki
F	Murasaki Shikibu Nikki
G	Sanuki no Suke Nikki
G'	Sanuki no Suke Nikki (earlier data before revision)
H	Taketori monogatari
I	Genji Monogatari

== Revised Ōno's lexical law by Mizutani ==
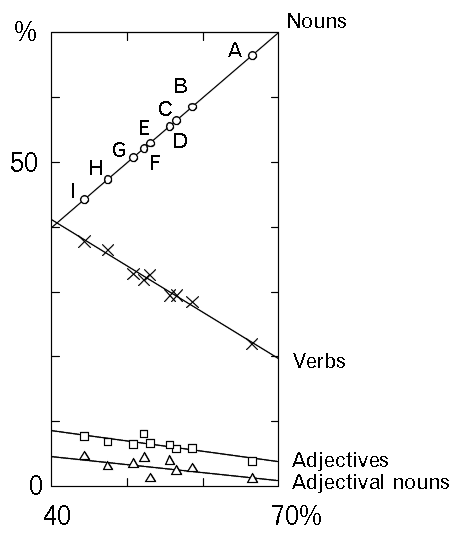
Fig. 2. Plot of (x_{i},y_{i}) of a literary work i based on the revised law by Mizutani. x_{i} denotes the rate of noun and y_{i}, the rate of a word class. For each word class, a least squares line is depicted.

Let the rates of noun usage in the lexicon of 3 arbitrary literary works A, B, and C be $X_0, x, X_1$, respectively. With rates for usage of another word class of the same 3 literatures, respectively, then 3 points, $(X_0, Y_0), (x, y), (X_1, Y_1)$ will approximately be located on a line. Namely,

$\frac{y - Y_0}{Y_1 - Y_0} \approx \frac{x - X_0}{X_1 - X_0}$.
