= Tsimané =

Indigenous people of Bolivia

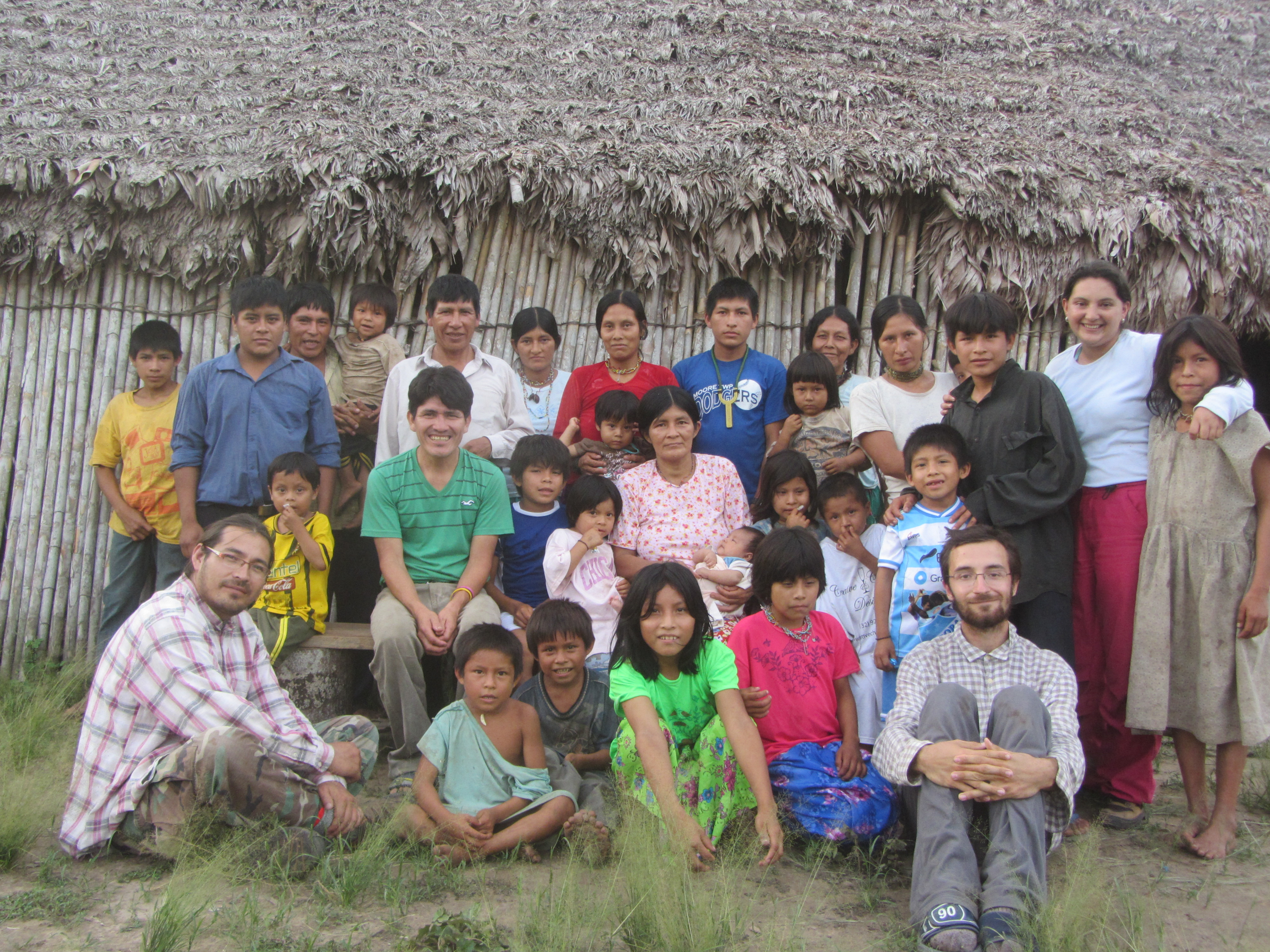

Total population
- 16,958

Regions with significant populations
- Bolivia (Beni)

Languages
- Tsimané, Spanish

Religion
- Traditional tribal religion

Related ethnic groups
- Mosetén

Photo taken in 1913 during Erland Nordenskiöld's expedition in Bolivia

The Tsimané, also known as the Tsimane' or Chimane, are an indigenous people of lowland Bolivia, living chiefly in the Beni Department municipalities of San Borja, San Ignacio de Moxos, Rurrenabaque, and Santa Ana del Yacuma. The Tsimané are the main residents of the T'simane Council Territory (Spanish: Territorio del Consejo T'simane) and the Pilón Lajas Reserve. They are primarily a subsistence agriculture culture, although hunting and fishing contribute significantly to many of the settlements' food supply. Those Tsimané living in the Reserve are affiliated with the multiethnic Consejo Regional Tsimane Moseten (CRTM), which holds the title to the Reserve as a Native Community Land or TCO.

== Name ==
The Tsimané are also known as the Achumano, Chamano, Chimane, Chimanis, Chimanisa, Chimnisin, Chumano, Nawazi-Moñtji, and Ramano people.

== Language ==
The Tsimané have their own language Tsimané, also called Mosetan, which is a language isolate having several dialect varieties, such as the Mosetén of Santa Ana and the Mosetén of Covendo which are mutually intelligible.

== Subsistence ==
They live in small communities composed of 20 to 30 families. Tsimané and Mosetén people depend mainly on subsistence farming, they cultivate bananas and manioc through swidden agriculture, although hunting, fishing and gathering contribute significantly as a source of food for almost all communities. The population has been undergoing some degree of market integration over the past 15 years, and some Tsimane now participate in the cash economy.

== Health ==
Both the Tsimane' Amazonian Panel Study and The Tsimane Health and Life History Project have studied the Tsimane since 2002. Among other things, it appears that they do not develop heart disease as they age in the same ways as people in the developed world. Blood tissue from the Tsimané exhibits a slower intrinsic epigenetic aging rate than that of other populations according to a biomarker of tissue age known as epigenetic clock. This finding might explain the "Tsimane inflammation paradox", wherein high levels of inflammation and infection, and low HDL cholesterol levels, are not associated with accelerated cardiovascular aging.

Tsimané sleep patterns have been studied as an example of "natural" sleep in nonindustrial or preindustrial societies, and to assess relationships between sleep patterns and health. Factors observed include sleep duration, timing, natural light, ambient temperature and seasonality. A normal daily pattern for a Tsimané group is to work during the day, congregate around a fire while cooking food, share a meal, then remain by the fire as it gets dark, sharing stories and information. Children and mothers tend to move away to sleep before male adults, with sleep onset occurring, on average, 3.3 hours after sunset. From beginning to end, sleep periods averaged 6.9–8.5 hours, with actual time slept of 5.7–7.1 hours, less sleep than reported in many industrial societies.

The average Tsimané woman has nine children in her lifetime. A study of 983 Tsimané women found that 70% were infected with the parasitic roundworm Ascaris lumbricoides, which is believed to have increased their fertility rate by suppressing their immune system, leading to two additional children over the course of a lifetime.
