= Thomas Smith-Stark =

American linguist (1948–2009)

- Born: January 1, 1948
- Died: May 17, 2009 (aged 61)

Academic background
- Education: Brown University; University of Chicago

Thomas Cedric Smith-Stark, also known as Thomas Smith-Stark or Thomas C. Smith-Stark (January 1, 1948 - May 17, 2009) was an American linguist known for his researches on Mesoamerican languages. Most of his academic career was developed in Mexico, where he lived for 28 years and he collaborated on 96 papers. Along with Terrence Kaufman and Lyle Campbell, he helped to define Mesoamerica as a linguistic area.

Smith-Stark was also part of the advisory board for the National Institute of Indigenous Languages and he took part in the discussions for drafting a Mexican policy on indigenous languages.

== Early career ==
Thomas Smith-Stark developed an interest in linguistics when he was in high school. In the public library, he read classic works on the field. He chose linguistics as major when he went to Brown University. Smith-Stark worked two summers on Frederic Cassidy's Dictionary of American Regional English project. He spent one summer in highland Guatemala.

He spent 22 months in the Marines working in military intelligence at Cherry Point, North Carolina. As part of his service in the Marines, he was sent to Greece, where he compiled a dictionary of Marine English. In 1971, he entered the doctoral program in linguistics at the University of Chicago.

== Fields of study ==
Thomas Smith-Stark was mainly interested in Mesoamerican languages. His doctoral thesis was on Pomam phonology and morphology. He developed early works on the antipassive and aspects of voice in Maya. He was into Maya glyphs, publishing in 1996 A Concordance to the Inscriptions of Palenque, Chiapas, with William Ringle. In 1981 he began to work at the Centro de Estudios Lingüísticos y Literarios of El Colegio de México. By the mid-1980, he started studying Amuzgo features like tone, verbal morphology, voice, and negation in collaboration with the native speaker of San Pedro Amuzgos Fermín Tapia. This represented its first contact with Oto-manguean languages.

He retook the works of Juan de Córdova in Zapotec and Antonio de Rincón in Nahuatl. He became an expert in colonial Zapotec and Nahuatl, and he completed studies related to missionary linguistics in early New Spain.

Between the 1980s and 1990, he worked in areal linguistics. With Lyle Campbell and Terrence Kaufman, he published "Meso-American as a Linguistic Area", which provided evidence that Mesoamerica should be regarded as a coherent region of language contact characterized by an identifiable set of linguistic features.

== Other ==
In the Research Library Juan de Córdova (Oaxaca, México) is available the Documentary Collection Thomas C. Smith-Stark. The collection contains books, archives, and papers that Smith-Stark elaborated on during all his life.
