= Susumu Ōno =

Japanese linguist

- Born: August 23, 1919; Japan Tokyo
- Died: July 14, 2008 (aged 88)
- Other name: 大野 晋
- Occupation: linguist

Susumu Ōno (大野 晋, Ōno Susumu; August 23, 1919 – July 14, 2008) was a Tokyo-born linguist, specializing in the early history of the Japanese language. He graduated from the University of Tokyo in 1943, where he studied under Shinkichi Hashimoto. He was professor emeritus at Gakushuin University.

== Career ==
Ōno is best remembered by fellow professional linguists for his work, following in the wake of his mentor Shinkichi Hashimoto, on the kana writing system and phonology of Old Japanese, published in 1953. He became known to the general reading public in 1957 with his popular book The Origins of the Japanese Language, which, together with Kindaichi Haruhiko's The Japanese Language, published the same year, created a lively interest in the nature, origins, and peculiarities of the language. He also collaborated with Takai Ichinosuke and Gomi Tomohide in the production of important editions of two early classics of Japanese literature, the Man'yōshū (1957–1962) and the Nihon Shoki (1965–1967). In addition, he co-edited a standard dictionary of early Japanese, the Iwanami Kogo Jiten (1974, second revised edition, 1990), and co-edited a new edition of the complete works of Motoori Norinaga, the greatest scholar of Kokugaku (1968–1993).

As a result, he became one of the best-known linguists in Japan. His 1999 book for general readers, Nihongo Renshūchō (日本語練習帳, Japanese Exercise Book), sold 1.8 million copies.

Ōno made a significant contribution to the field of Japanese quantitative linguistics by indicating a statistical relationship, known as "Ōno's lexical law", between the category of classical Japanese literary works and the rate of usage of word classes in their lexicons.

== Hypothesis on a genetic link with the Tamil language ==
Over the last three decades, Ōno has won notability, though not always complimentary, for his support of the hypothesis, first put forward by Susumu Shiba in 1970, and developed by Akira Fujiwara, most notably in 1981, that the Japanese and the Tamil languages share a common ancestry. His theory has been severely criticized by prominent Japanese Indologist Tokunaga Muneo, and by other comparativists like Kazama Kiyozō.

Generally speaking, like many other "amateur hypotheses" about the origins of the Japanese language, his theory "collapses" because the author, though a top-ranking scholar of Japanese, is thought to have presented his theories without taking into consideration the intricate complexities of the comparative methodologies of philology. Ōno's attempt to confront his critics, in the article cited here, is successful in disarming Roy Andrew Miller's critique but said to be failing to answer the general charge, made much earlier on his previous theories about an Austronesian origin for the language. The argument for a similar word order in Tamil and Japanese, for example, also holds for Japanese and some Papuan languages.

== Popular works on Japanese ==
- Nihongo no kigen, Iwanami, Tokyo 1957
- Nihongo no nenrin, Shinchō Bunko, Tokyo 1966
- Nihongo o sakanoboru, Iwanami, Tokyo 1974
- Nihongo no bunpō o kangaeru, Iwanami, Tokyo 1978
- Nihongo izen, Iwanami, Tokyo 1987
- Nihongo no keisei, Iwanami Shoten, Tokyo 2000
- Yayoi bunmei to minami-Indo, Iwanami Shoten 2004

== See also ==
- Japanese language classification
- Japanese literature
- Dravido-Korean languages
