= Dravido-Korean languages =

Abandoned language family proposal

Dravido-Korean
- (probably spurious)
- Geographic distribution: South India, Japan and Korea
- Linguistic classification: Proposed language family
- Subdivisions: Dravidian; Koreanic; Japonic (sometimes included)

Language codes
- Glottolog: None

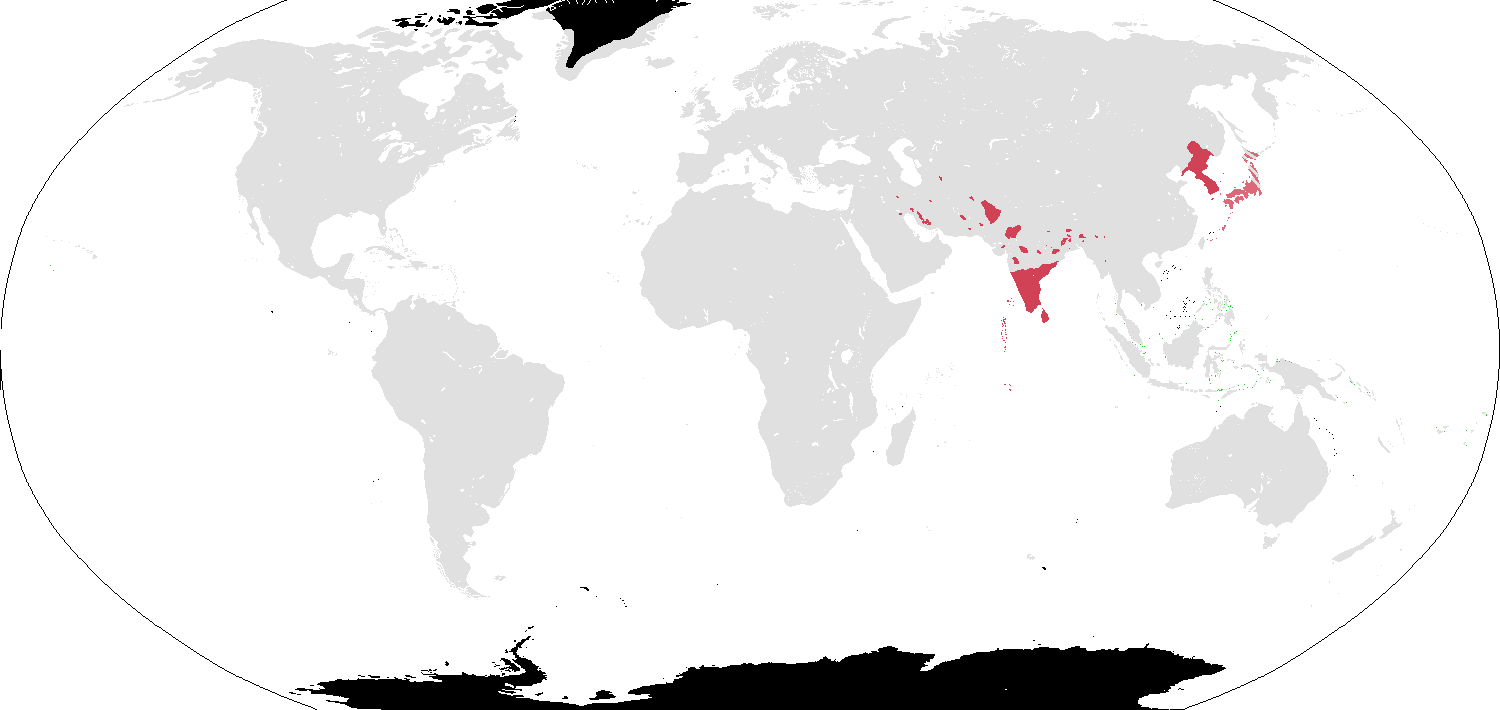
Language map of the suggested Dravido-Korean-Japonic family (including Ainu and Nihali)

Dravido-Koreanic, sometimes Dravido-Koreo-Japonic, is an abandoned proposal linking the Dravidian languages to Korean and (in some versions) to Japanese.

== History ==
A genetic link between the Dravidian languages and Korean was first hypothesized by Homer B. Hulbert in 1905. In Susumu Ōno's book The Origin of the Japanese Language (1970), he proposed a layer of Dravidian (specifically Tamil) vocabulary in both Korean and Japanese. Morgan E. Clippinger gave a detailed comparison of Korean and Dravidian vocabulary in his article "Korean and Dravidian: Lexical Evidence for an Old Theory" (1984).

Historically, the Samguk yusa describes Heo Hwang-ok, who was the first queen of Geumgwan Gaya—a statelet of the Kaya confederacy—as coming from Ayuta in India. Despite the name "Ayuta" not being properly attested, in recent times, some attribute the kingdom to southern India though it is still debated. According to historian Byung-mo Kim in 2011, the Kingdom of Karak (Geumgwan Gaya) of King Suro was named after an old Dravidian word meaning "fish". However, Kim later changed his stance after discovering that the fish worshipping culture started from ancient Babylon and not India in 2018. In addition, historians such as Kwang-soo Lee and Hwa-seob Song argue that due to the Samguk yusa being compiled in the 12th century and containing many mythical narratives surrounding Queen Heo, it is not considered as strong evidence based on facts, unlike the Samguk sagi. According to Geo-ryong Lee, hypothetically, limited contact with Dravidian culture through trade may have introduced Indian elements to Kaya through the Silk Road where Dravido-related words were introduced.

However, the theory is left abandoned by linguists since the 1980s due to the lack of evidence and enthusiasm within the Korean academia with many favoring other more widely accepted theories (such as the Koreanic family theory, Japonic-Koreanic theory or the Macro-Altaic theory) over the Dravido-Korean theory.

== Recognition of language similarities ==
Similarities between the Dravidian languages and Korean were first noted by French missionaries in Korea. In 1905, Homer B. Hulbert wrote a comparative grammar of Korean and Dravidian in which he hypothesized a genetic connection between the two. According to Hulbert, the endings of many names of ancient settlements of southern Korea could be traced to Dravidian words.

Later, Susumu Ōno caused controversy in Japan with his theory that Tamil constituted a lexical stratum of both Korean and Japanese, which was widely publicized in the following years, but was quickly abandoned.

Ki-Moon Lee, an emeritus professor at Seoul National University, stated in 2011 that Clippinger, who applied the comparative method systematically to Middle Korean forms and reconstructed Dravidian forms, and his conclusion should be revisited, but maintained his attitude towards the theory as "abandoned (사장되었다)".

== Arguments ==
Susumu Ōno, and Homer B. Hulbert proposed that early Dravidian people, especially Tamils, migrated to the Korean peninsula and Japan. Hulbert based his theories of language relationships and associated migration patterns on the Turanian language hypothesis, which has been obsolete since the early 20th century. Morgan E. Clippinger presented 408 putative cognates and derived about 60 phonological correspondences from them. Clippinger proposed that some cognates were closer than others, leading him to speculate a genetic link which was reinforced by a later migration. Comparative linguist Kang Gil-un identifies 1300 Dravidian Tamil cognates in Korean. He suggests that Korean is probably related to the Nivkh language and influenced by Tamil. There are two basic common features:

- all three languages are agglutinative.
- all three follow SOV word order, with modifiers preceding modified words, and are post-positional.

However, typological similarities such as these could easily be due to coincidence as:

- agglutinative languages are quite common and widely distributed.
- half of the languages in the world follow SOV word order.
- majority of the proposed words lack genetical affinity.

The lack of a statistically significant number of cognates and the lack of anthropological and genetic links can be adduced to dismiss this proposal.

Similar to the Dravido-Japanese relationship, the general consensus is that neither Korean or Japanese show genetic affinity with the Dravidian languages.
