= Algonquian–Wakashan languages =

Hypothetical language family of North America

Algonquian–Wakashan
- Almosan
- (hypothetical)
- Geographic distribution: North America, Sakhalin Island, and Southern Siberia
- Linguistic classification: proposed language family
- Subdivisions: Algic; Sapir, 1929: Kutenai; Mosan; or Nikolaev, 2015–2016: Nivkh; Wakashan

Language codes
- Glottolog: None
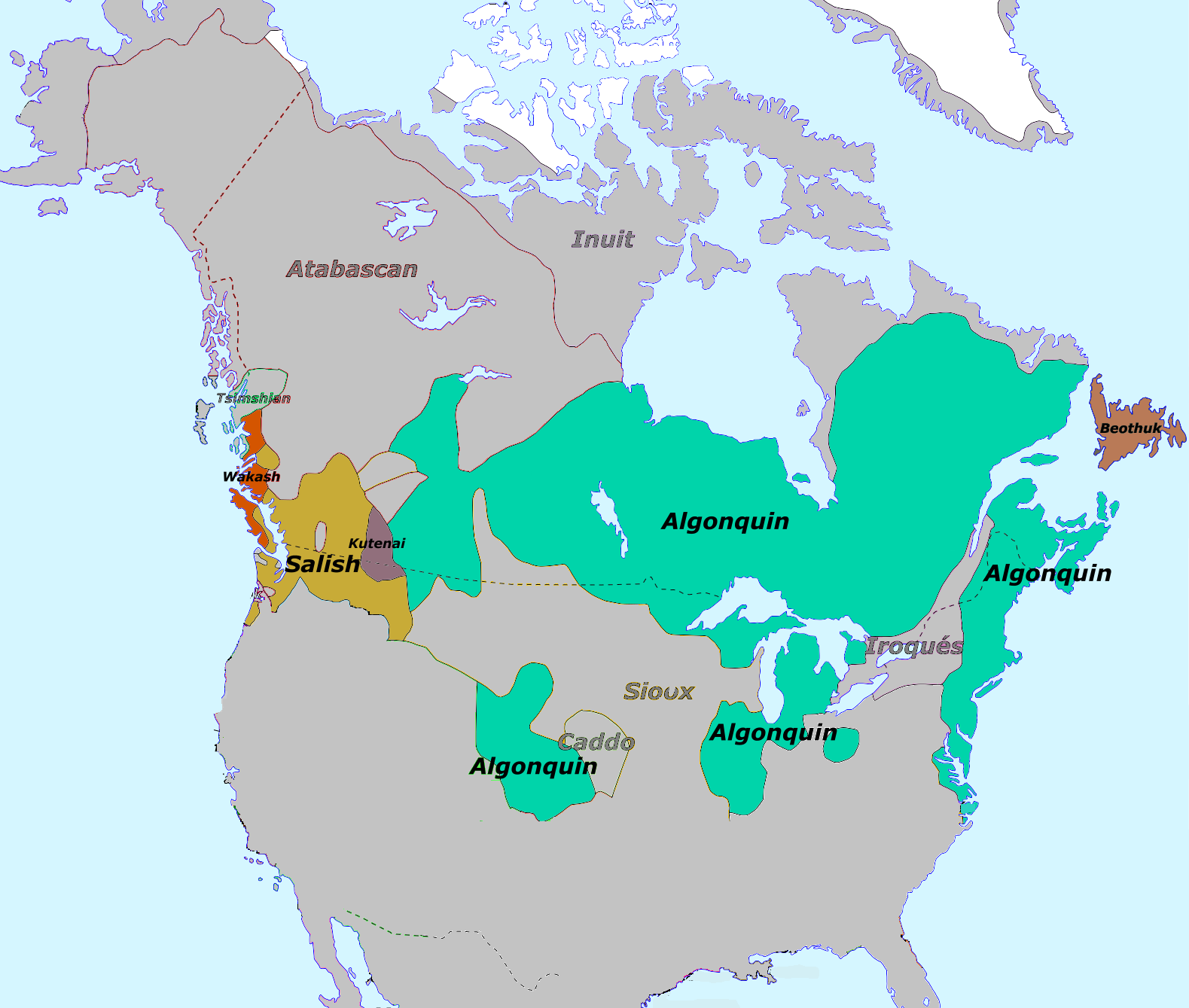
- Not shown: Yurok, Wiyot

Algonquian–Wakashan (also Almosan, Algonkian–Mosan, Algonkin–Wakashan) is a hypothetical language family that would connect together several North American, and possibly Siberian according to an interpretation, established language families.

The original 1929 proposal, made by Edward Sapir, consists of the following families:

- Algonquian–Wakashan
  - Algic (Algonkin–Ritwan)
    - Algonquian (Algonkin)
    - Beothuk
    - Wiyot–Yurok (Ritwan)
  - Kutenai (also known as Kootenay; a language isolate)
  - Mosan
    - Wakashan
    - Chimakuan
    - Salishan

Kutenai may possibly be distantly related to the Salishan family, but this link has not been demonstrated. The Mosan family proposal is also hypothetical and is currently considered undemonstrated, rather appearing to be a Sprachbund.

A more recent hypothesis, first formulated in 2015 by Sergei Nikolaev, includes

- Algonquian-Wakashan
  - Nivkh-Algic
    - Nivkh
    - Algic
  - Wakashan

== Proposed external relationships ==
Joseph Greenberg renamed Sapir's proposal Almosan and grouped it in an even more inclusive Almosan–Keresiouan phylum with the Caddoan, Iroquoian, Keresan, and Siouan families. This proposal has been rejected by linguists specializing in Native American languages.

Murray Gell-Mann, Ilia Peiros, and Georgiy Starostin group Chukotko-Kamchatkan and Nivkh with Almosan.

Sergei Nikolaev in the two papers where he was arguing for a relationship between the Nivkh language, the Algic languages and the Wakashan languages, also proposed a more remote relationship between these three together and the Salishan languages .

== See also ==
- Chukotko-Kamchatkan–Amuric

== Bibliography ==
- Campbell, Lyle. (1997). American Indian languages: The historical linguistics of Native America. New York: Oxford University Press. ISBN 0-19-509427-1.
- Greenberg, Joseph H. (1987). Language in the Americas. Stanford: Stanford University Press.
- Sapir, Edward. (1929). Central and North American languages. In The encyclopædia britannica: A new survey of universal knowledge (14 ed.) (Vol. 5, pp. 138–141). London: The Encyclopædia Britannica Company, Ltd.
