= Timoto–Cuica people =

Timoto-Cuica
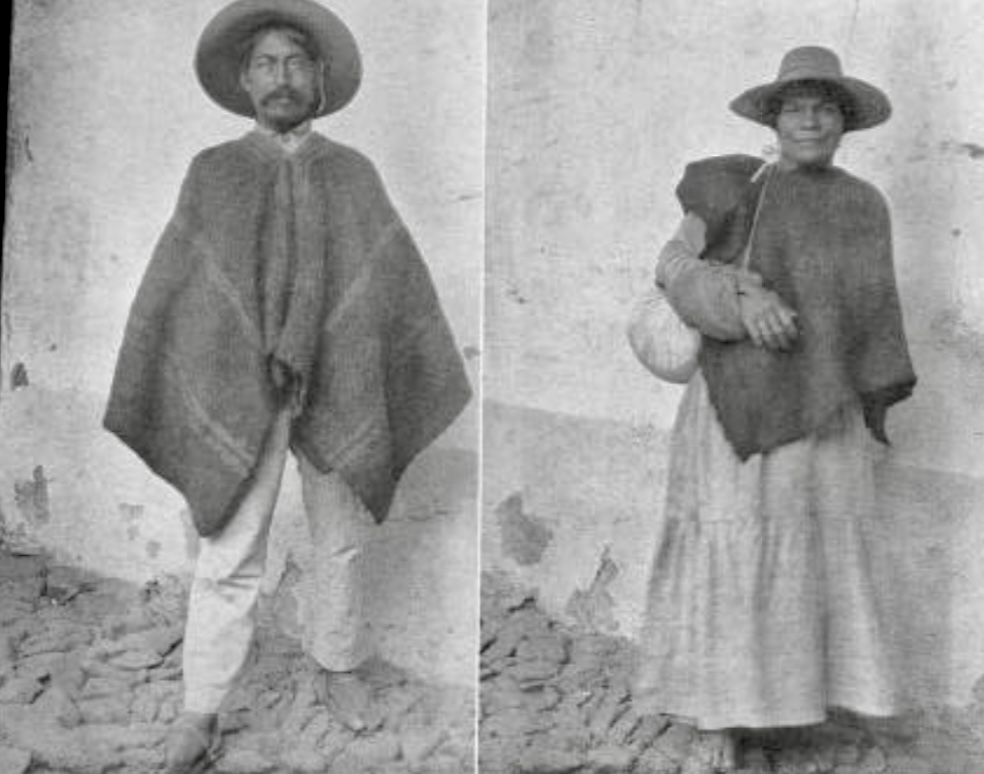
- Mucuchí people, who were part of the Timoto tribe, from Misteke, Venezuela

Total population
- Unknown

Regions with significant populations
- Venezuelan Andes: (Mérida, Trujillo, Táchira): Small

Languages
- Timote-Cuica

Related ethnic groups
- Muisca

The Timoto–Cuica people are an Indigenous people of the Americas composed primarily of two large tribes, the Timote and the Cuica, that inhabited in the Andes region of Western Venezuela. They were closely related to the Muisca people of the Colombian Andes, who spoke Muysccubun, also called Chibcha. The Timoto-Cuicas were not only composed of the Timote and the Cuica groups, but also of smaller tribes including the Mucuchíes, the Miguríes, the Tabayes and the Mucuñuques.

== Culture and society ==
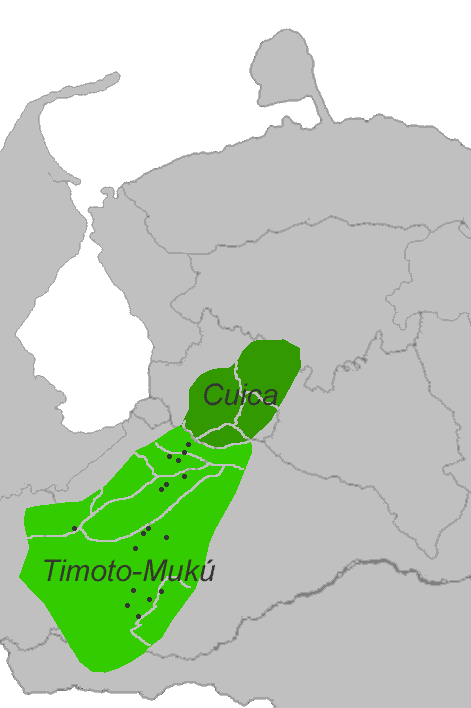
Timoto and Cuica toponyms

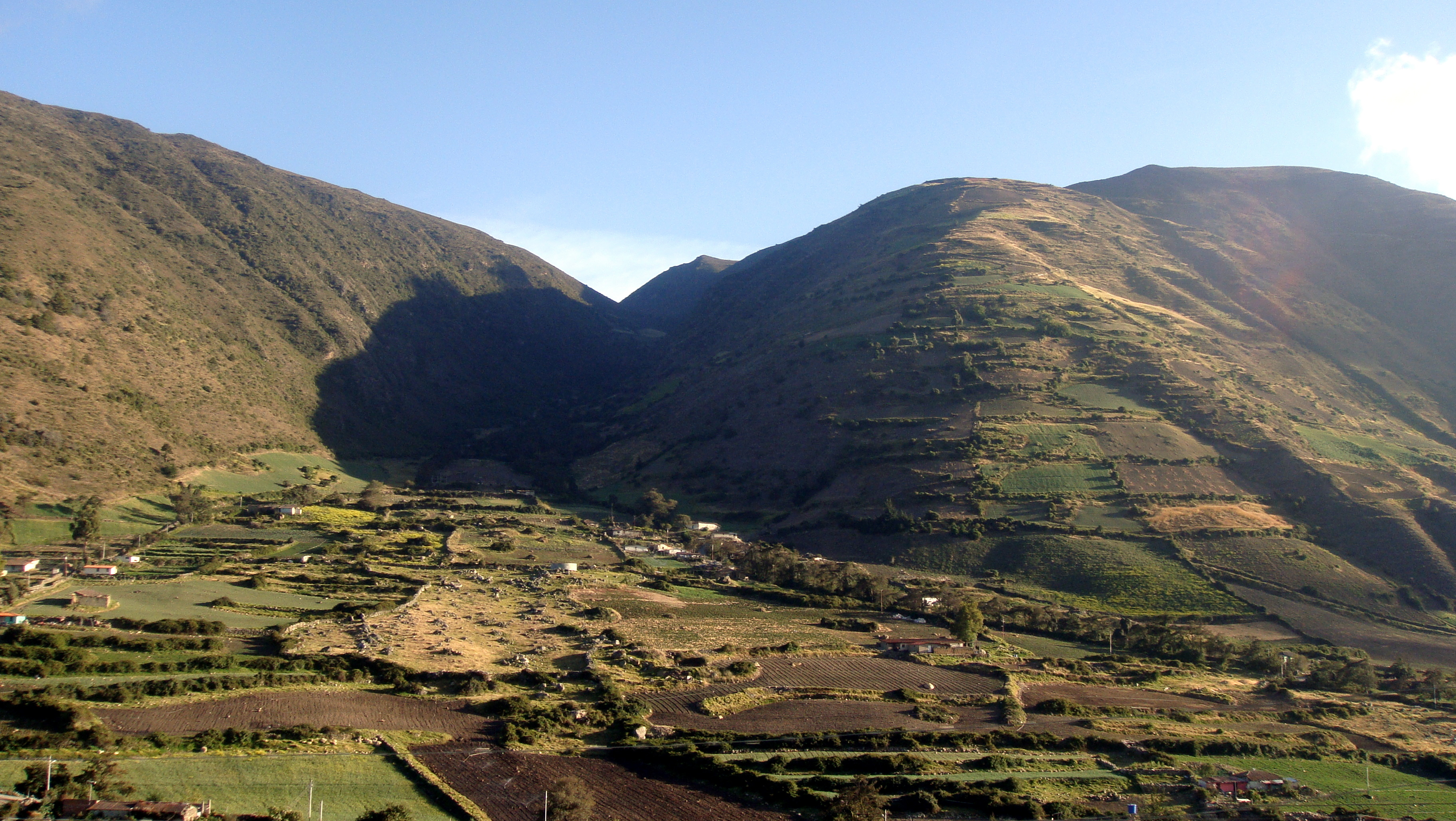
Timoto-Cuica territory, in present-day Mérida, Venezuela.

Pre-Columbian Venezuela had an estimated indigenous population of one million, with the Andean region being the most densely populated area. The two groups lived in what are today the states of Mérida, Trujillo and Táchira. Most scholars agree that the Timoto-Cuicas arose as a distinct tribal group, with the Timotes and the Cuicas as the main components of largely the same identity. They possessed advanced technology and thrived as a civilization much more developed than the nomadic tribes further east. The Timotes were mostly present in the area of today’s Mérida state in Venezuela, the mountainous Andean region, with the sub-group of Cuicas living slightly to the north, in the llano plains.

The chief characteristic of the Timoto-Cuicas culture was their focus on agriculture, primitive industry and trade. They focused heavily on the terraced cultivation system, by creating irrigated platforms on the hillsides of the region – a system often seen in the Andean civilizations. Society was complex with pre-planned permanent villages, surrounded by irrigated, terraced fields. They also stored water in tanks. Their houses were made primarily of stone and wood with thatched roofs. They were peaceful, for the most part and depended on growing crops. Regional crops included potatoes and ullucos.

By creating large ‘steps’, reinforcing them with stone and irrigating them with a system of channels, they managed to succeed in creating an efficient agricultural system. This skillful method of cultivation allowed the Timoto-Cuicas to grow an abundance of vegetables – the earliest sources mention the growing of potatoes and corn, as well as beans, sweet yucca and several indigenous plants: cassava, mecuy, quiba, guaba and agave.

They left behind works of art, particularly anthropomorphic ceramics, but no major monuments. They spun vegetable fibers to weave into textiles and mats for housing.

== Subgroups ==
=== Mason (1950) ===
Mason (1950) provides a lengthy internal classification of Cuica and Timote:

Timóte (Timoti)

- 1. Timóte proper
  - Mukurujún
  - Mukusé
  - Mokoyupu
  - Mukuarsé
  - Ciribuy
  - Miyoy
  - Mukumbá
  - Kindorá
  - Tafallé
  - Mukumbají
  - Chino
- 2. Mocochí (Mokochi)
  - Miyuse
  - Tukaní
  - Mokochi (Torondoy)
- 3. Mukutu (Escaguey)
  - Eskaguey
  - Kanaguá
  - Kinó
  - Mokoino (Mokino)
  - Mombun
  - Yarikagua
  - Arikagua
  - Mukutuy
  - Mukupatí
  - Mukuchachi
  - Trikagua
  - Mokoto (Mukutu, Mukutí)
    - Guarake
    - Bailadores
- 4. Tapano
  - Aviamo
  - Mokombó (Mokobo)
  - Tapano
- 5. Chama (Miguri ?)
  - Mokunche (Mukunche, Mukuneche)
  - Mukurubá (Mokuruguá)
  - Tabay (Mukunutáne, Tabayon ?)
  - Mukurumagua
  - Guake (Guakí)
  - Mukumba
  - Chichuy
  - Mukuñoke (Mukuño, Migurí ?)
    - Mukurufuén
    - Muká
    - Mukumpí
    - Mukutirí
    - Mukusnandá
    - Mukaikuy
    - Mukusó, etc.
  - Mukurandá
  - Mukuhúun (Mukupine, Mokoion)
  - Chiguará
  - Insnumbí (Insumbi)
  - Estankes
  - Mukuchi (Makuchi, Mokochiz)
    - Misantá
    - Mokao
    - Mosnachó
    - Misikea, etc.
  - Eskagüey
  - Mukujún
  - Tatuy (Tatey ?)
  - Mukaria
  - Mukaketá
  - Mukusirí
  - Kaparú
  - Jají (Mukundú)
  - Mukubache (Mirripú, Mirripuy, Maripú ?)
  - Mukúun (Mukumpú, Lagunillas)
    - Kasés
    - Mukuinamo
    - Arikagua
    - Tibikuay
    - Makulare
    - Mukusumpú
    - Barbudos
    - Jamuén, etc.
    - Kinaró
    - Tiguiñó
  - Guaruní (Guarurí)

Cuica (Kuika)

- 1. Cuica proper
- 2. Tostó
  - Tostó proper
  - Tiranjá
  - Tomoní
- 3. Eskuke (Eskukey)
  - Eskuke proper
  - Bombá
  - Moka
  - Tirandá
    - Chobú
    - Chachike
    - Chachu
    - Tirandá proper
    - Estiguate (Estiguati)
- 4. Jajó (Jakón, Jajón)
  - Jajó proper
  - Esnijaque
  - Kikoke (Kikoki)
  - Mapen (La Vega)
  - Duri
  - Mikimboy

Unclassified tribes

- Kirorá
- Mijure
- Montun
- Iguino

== Gallery ==
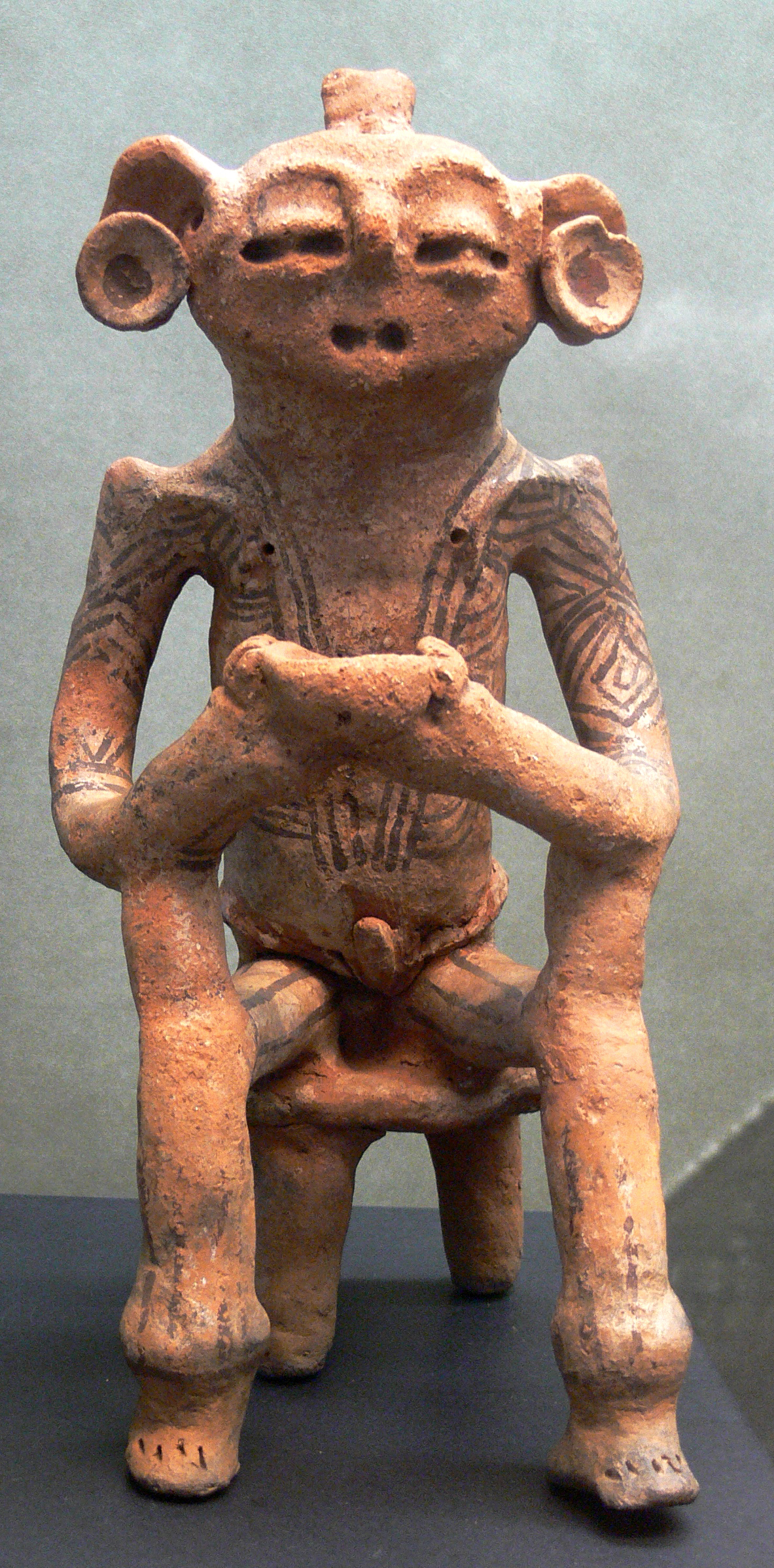
Masculine figure from Trujillo c. 500 AD

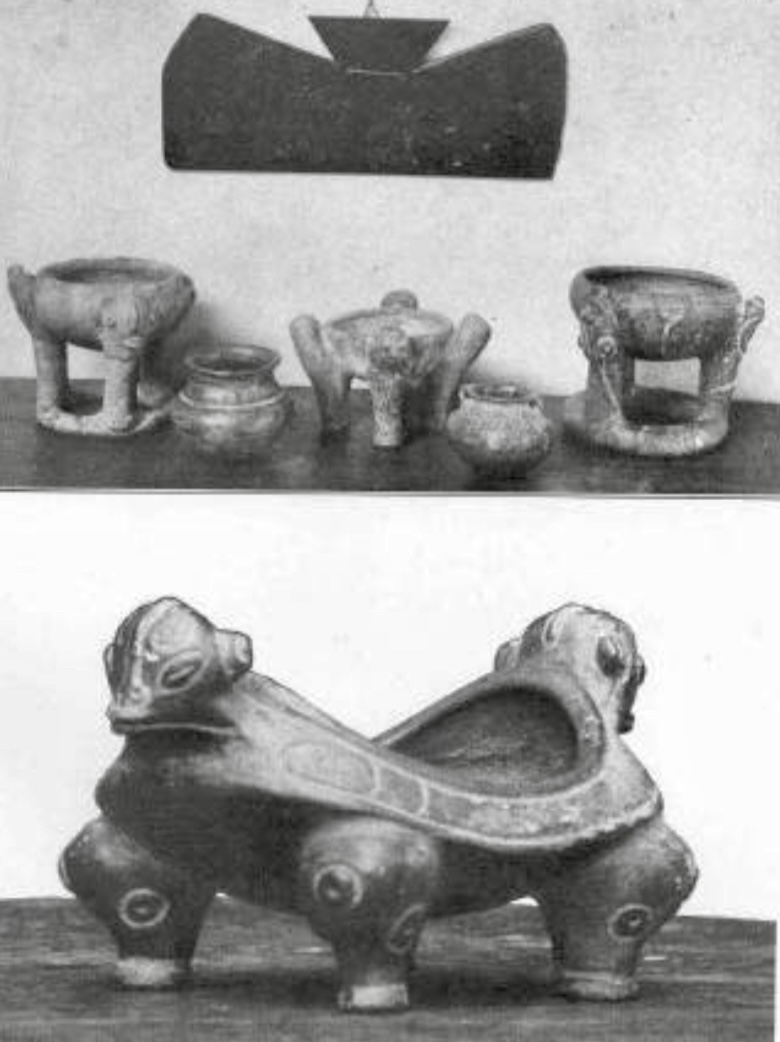
Plaque and ceramics of the Nikitao and Cuica tribes

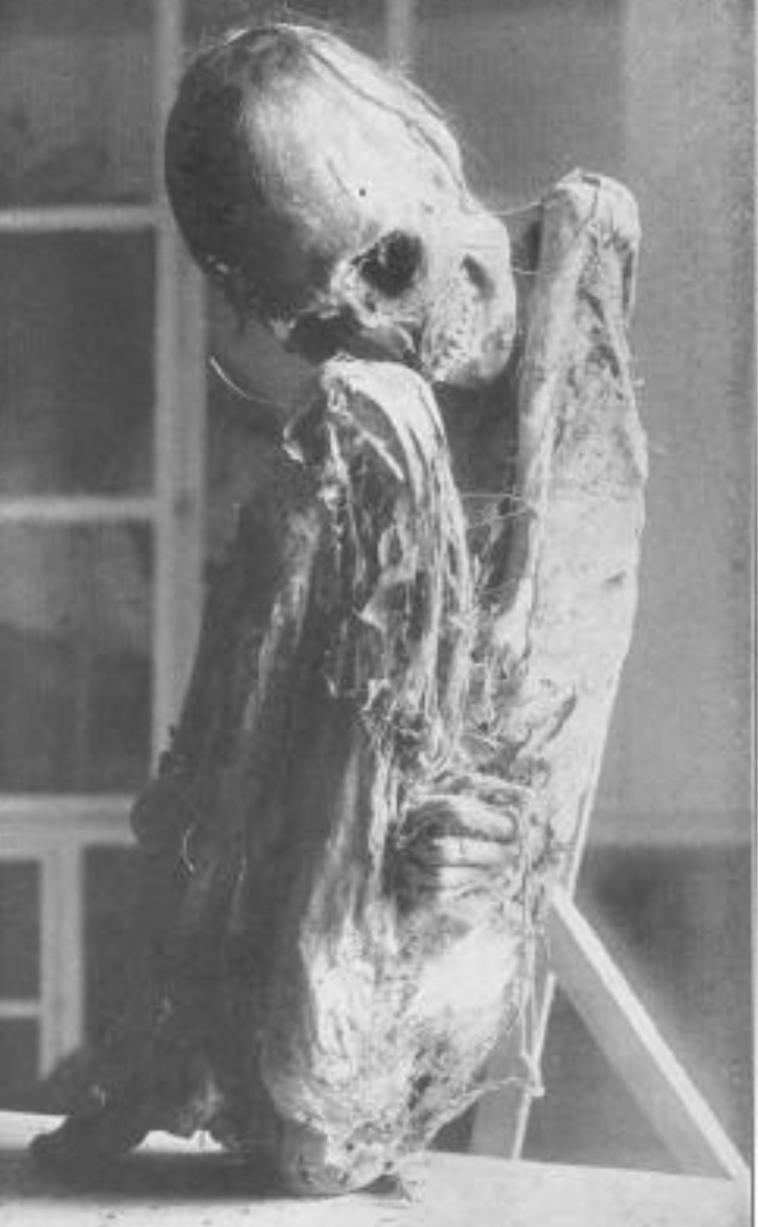
Mummy from the Isnumbí people, Diocesan Museum of Mérida

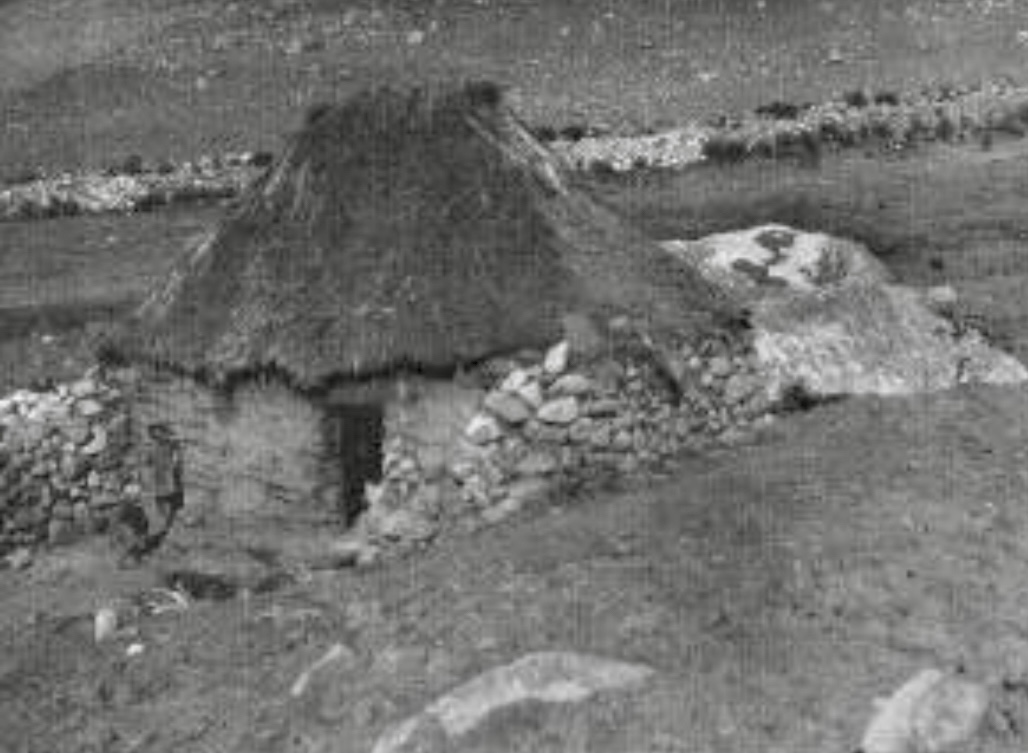
Room of the natives of Apartaderos

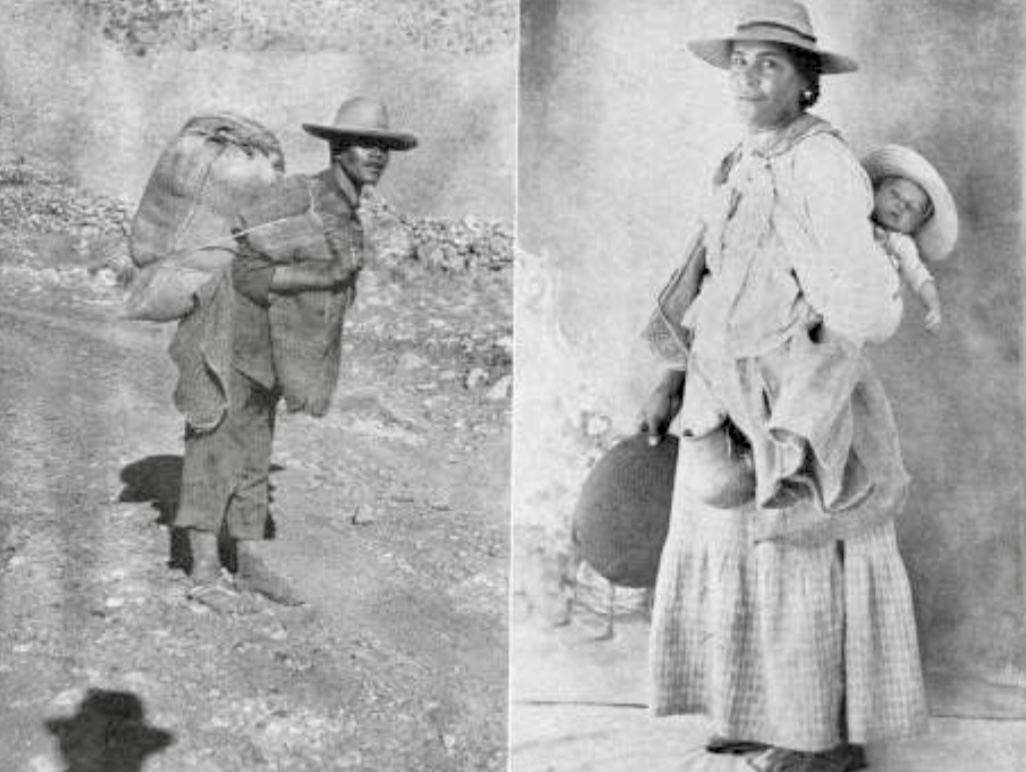
Mucuchí people

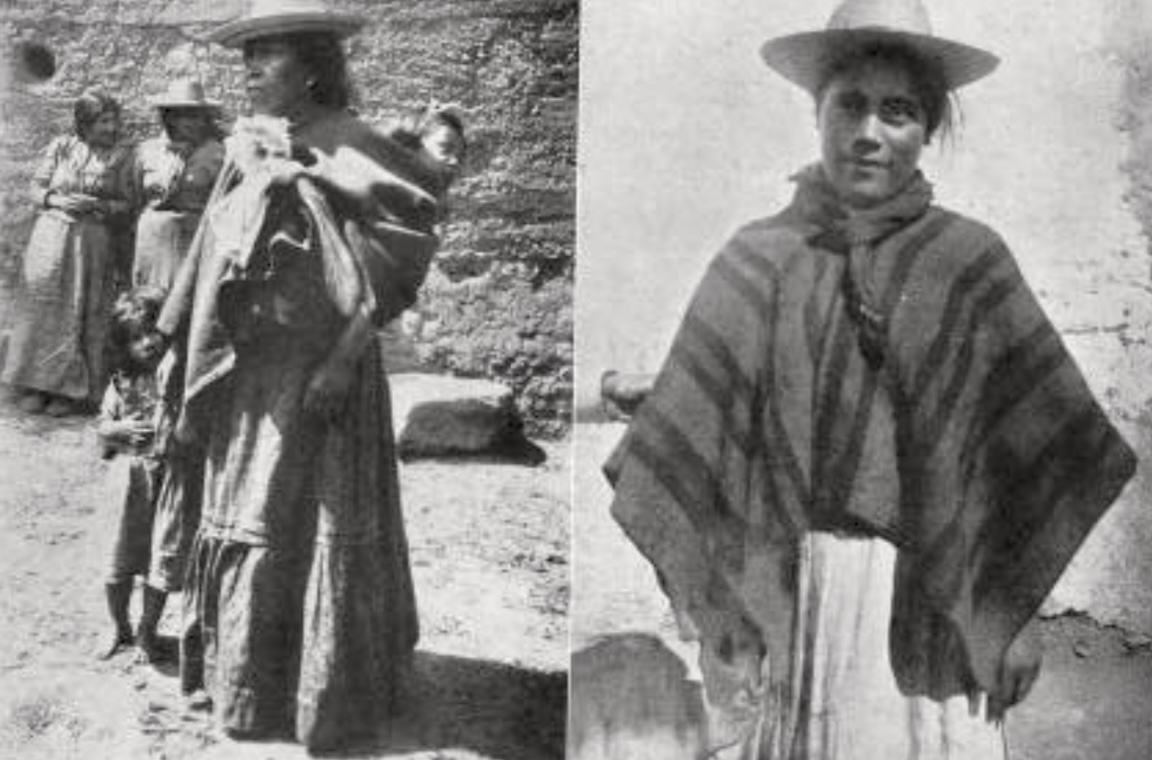
Mucuchí women

== Bibliography ==
- Mahoney, James. "Colonialism and Postcolonial Development: Spanish American in Comparative Perspective." New York: Cambridge University Press, 2010. ISBN 978-0-521-11634-3.
