= Pontic languages =

Proposed language macrofamily

Pontic
- (controversial)
- Geographic distribution: Eurasia
- Linguistic classification: Proposed language family
- Subdivisions: Northwest Caucasian; Indo-European

Language codes
- Glottolog: None

Pontic is a proposed language family or macrofamily, comprising the Indo-European and Northwest Caucasian language families, with Proto-Pontic being its reconstructed proto-language.

== History of the proposal ==
The internal reconstruction of the Indo-European proto-language done by Émile Benveniste and Winfred P. Lehmann has set Proto-Indo-European (PIE) typologically quite apart from its daughters. In 1960, Aert Kuipers noticed the parallels between a Northwest Caucasian language, Kabardian, and PIE. It was Paul Friedrich in 1964, however, who first suggested that PIE might be phylogenetically related to Proto-Caucasian.

In 1981, John Colarusso examined typological parallels involving consonantism, focusing on the so-called laryngeals of PIE and in 1989, he published his reconstruction of Proto-Northwest Caucasian (PNWC). Eight years later, the first results of his comparative work on PNWC and PIE were published in his article Proto-Pontic: Phyletic Links Between Proto-Indo-European and Proto-Northwest Caucasian, an event which may be considered the actual beginning of the hypothesis.

== Evidence ==
Examples of similarities that have been noted include:

- Nasal negating particles in both families:
  - PIE *n-: Germanic un-, Romance in-, Slavic ne-.
  - NWC: Ubykh m-, Abkhaz m-.
- A case variously named "accusative", "oblique" or "objective", marked with nasal suffixes:
  - PIE accusative *-m, reflected e.g. in Latin luna 'moon' (nom.) vs lunam (acc.), or Ancient Greek ἄνθρωπος (anthropos, nom.) vs. ἄνθρωπον (anthropon, acc.).
  - NWC: Ubykh k^{w}æy 'well (water source)' (abs.) vs k^{w}æyn (obl.).
