= Austronesian–Ongan languages =

Proposed connection between Ongan and Austronesian language families

Austronesian–Ongan
- (widely rejected)
- Geographic distribution: Southeast Asia, East Asia, the Pacific and Madagascar
- Linguistic classification: Proposed language family
- Subdivisions: Austronesian; Ongan

Language codes
- Glottolog: None

Austronesian–Ongan is a controversial proposed language family that would include the Ongan and Austronesian language families. The proposal was first proposed by Juliette Blevins in 2007. Ongan is a small family of two attested languages in the Andaman Islands, while Austronesian is one of the largest language families in the world, originating in Taiwan and spreading throughout the Indian and Pacific oceans. The proposed connection has been rejected by other linguists.

== Sound correspondences ==
Blevins (2007) proposes the following sound correspondences:

Consonants
Proto-Austronesian (PAN)	*p	*t	*k	*q	*ku	*qu	*ʔ	*b	*d	*g	*s, *S	*c, *C	*z	*j	*h	*m	*n	*ny	*ŋ	*N	*l	*r	*R	*w
Proto-Ongan (PO)	*p	*t	*k		*kw		*ʔ	*b	*d	*j, *g	*c			*j, *y	*h, *y, *∅	*m	*n	*ny	*ŋ	*l, *y	*l	*r	*l, *r	*w

There is neutralization and sometimes loss of final nasals in Proto-Ongan, with final **n merged into Proto-Ongan *ŋ, and final **m and **ny partially merged into *ŋ. (The latter merger, and loss, may post-date Proto-Ongan.) Final (oral) stops are lost in multisyllabic words (unstressed syllables?) in Proto-Ongan.

Initial **b drops from Proto-Ongan before **u and perhaps before **i.

**qw and **kw become *kw in Proto-Ongan, and *q/k or *w in Proto-AN.

Proto-Ongan and Proto-AN share a typologically odd restriction against root-initial *m-.

Vowel-initial words in Proto-Ongan correspond to *q in Proto-AN; because the Austronesian forms often include doublets, Blevins believes this is due to epenthesis in Proto-AN.

Vowels in open, non-final syllables
Proto-Austronesian (PAN)	*i	*u	*a	*ə	*ay#
Proto-Ongan (PO)	*i	*u, *o	*a, *e	*e	*e#

Final **ay has become *e in Proto-Ongan. *e also derives from **a before palatals, word-finally, and when unstressed.

Proto-Ongan *o typically derives from **u in a checked syllable, or from assimilation as in **wa.

Proto-Ongan *ə is thought to have been an allophone of *e, found before coda nasals except after palatals.

== Grammatical correspondences ==
Most derivational morphology and grammatical words are so short that the several resemblances between Proto-Ongan and Proto-Austronesian may be chance. However, Ongan morphology does appear to explain an odd situation in Austronesian.

Proto-Austronesian has a limited set of reconstructed vowel-initial roots, all of which are kin terms, body parts, or other readily possessed nouns. Ongan languages have inalienable possession, and inalienably possessed nouns are all vowel initial. Elsewhere, vowel-initial roots in Proto-Ongan correspond to initial *q- in Proto-Austronesian. The complete list of vowel-initial Proto-AN roots reconstructed by Blust is as follows:

Kin
*aki grandfather; *ama father, paternal uncle; *aNak child; *apu grandparent/grandchild; *aya paternal aunt; *ina mother, maternal aunt
Body
*ujung/ijung nose; *ikuR tail; *iSeq urine; *uRat vein, sinew; *utaq vomit
Other
*asu/wasu dog; *aCab cover; *ian home; *uNay splinter

These are all the kinds of words expected in inalienable-possession systems. Blevins suggests that inalienable possession was lost from Proto-Austronesian, presumably after epenthetic *q- was added to vowel-initial words. There are many Proto-AN doublets like *wasu, *asu 'dog'; initial *w- has also been lost from *w-anaN 'right side' and *w-iRi 'left side' in Pazeh and other languages, from what Blust describes as "some now-obscured morphological process". Blevins suggests that in all three cases, the Proto-Austronesian *w- reflects the Proto-Ongan possessive prefix *gw- 'his, her', which remained as a fossil in some daughter languages. Thus proto-Austronesian–Ongan may explain some of the odd patterns found in proto-Austronesian.

== Criticism ==
The proposal of a genealogical connection between Austronesian and Ongan has not been well received by other linguists. Van Driem (2011) considers Blevins' evidence as "not compelling", although he leaves the possibility open that some resemblances could be the result of contact/borrowing, a position also held by Hoogervorst (2012). Blust (2014) argues that Blevins' conclusions are not supported by her data, and that of her first 25 reconstructions, none are reproducible using the comparative method. Blust concludes that the grammatical comparison does not hold up, and also cites non-linguistic (such as cultural, archaeological, and biological) evidence against Blevins' hypothesis.
