= Carabayo =

Uncontacted people of Colombia

Carabayo Yurí
Yacumo?
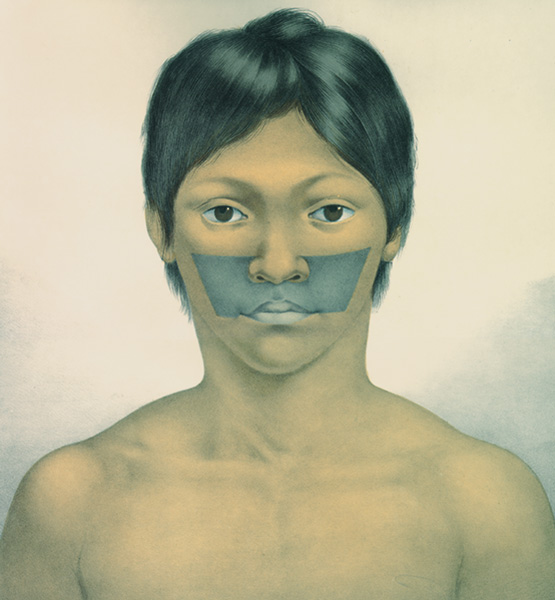
- A Yurí person, recorded in 1820

Total population
- estimated 150

Regions with significant populations
- Colombia

Languages
- Carabayo

Religion
- traditional tribal religion

The Carabayo (who perhaps call themselves Yacumo) are an uncontacted people of Colombia living in at least three long houses, known as malokas, along the Rio Puré (now the Río Puré National Park) in the southeastern corner of the country. They live in the Amazonas Department of Colombian Amazon rainforest, near the border with Brazil. They share the protected National Park with the Passé and Jumana people.

In the last 400 years, Carabayo people have had intermittent contact with outsiders, including violent attacks by slave traders and rubber extractors, resulting in their retreat from outside groups and increased isolation.

== Name ==
The Carabayo are also known as the Aroje or Yuri people. They are known as the Aroje to the Bora people. Maku and Macusa are pejorative Arawak terms meaning 'without speech' applied to many local languages, and are not specific to Carabayo.

== Language ==
The Carabayo language appears to be a member of the Tikuna–Yuri family.

== Legal protection ==
In 2002, the Colombian government—with the aim of ensuring the protection of the territory and the survival of the Yuri people, as well as respecting their decision to remain uncontacted by mainstream society—established the Río Puré National Natural Park. This park is located within the non-municipalized areas of La Pedrera, Tarapacá, and Puerto Arica, in the Department of Amazonas.

In December 2011, President Juan Manuel Santos signed legal decree #4633, which guarantees uncontacted peoples such as the Carabayo the rights to their voluntary isolation, their traditional territories, and reparations if they face violence from outsiders.

On October 24, 2023, a land restitution judge in Cundinamarca granted a request for a precautionary measure—filed by the Land Restitution Unit on behalf of the Yuri and Passé Indigenous peoples—after determining that they are at risk due to illegal mining activities within the Río Puré National Natural Park. The judge ordered the competent authorities to take the necessary steps to halt these activities and prevent outsiders from entering the territory inhabited by these Indigenous groups, who live in voluntary isolation.
