= Carabayo language =

Language of Colombia related to Ticuna and Yuri

Carabayo
- Aroje, Caraballo, Amazonas Macusa
- Yacumo
- Native to: Colombia
- Ethnicity: 200 Carabayo (aerial survey)
- Native speakers: 150 (2007)
- Language family: Ticuna–Yuri: Carabayo
- Early form: Yuri

Language codes
- ISO 639-3: cby
- Glottolog: cara1245
- ELP: Carabayo
- Carabayo is classified as Extinct by the UNESCO Atlas of the World's Languages in Danger

The Carabayo (Caraballo) language is a poorly documented language spoken by the Carabayo people, also known as Yuri and Aroje, an uncontacted Amazonian people of Colombia living in at least three longhouses, one of several suspected uncontacted peoples living along the Rio Puré (now the Río Puré National Park) in the southeastern corner of the country. They are known as the Aroje to the Bora people. Maku and Macusa are pejorative Arawak terms applied to many local languages, not anything specific to Carabayo. The name "Carabayo" is taken from a mock name, "Bernardo Caraballo", given to a Carabayo man during his captivity in the Capuchin mission at La Pedrera in 1969 after the Colombian boxer. It has been reported that their self-designation is Yacumo.

== Classification ==
It is often assumed that the Carabayo language and people are a continuation of the Yuri language and people attested from the same area in the 19th century. Indeed, Colombian government publications speak of the "Yuri (Carabayo)", "Carabayo (Yuri)", or "Yuri, Aroje, or Carabayo" as a single people. However, the only information on the Carabayo language was obtained when a family was kidnapped during a violent encounter and held in a mission for several weeks. During this time, one of the priests wrote down words that he overheard, or that were used in exchanges with him, sometimes with a context that suggested their meaning. Fifty words were collected; excluding Spanish words like tabako that were picked up during captivity, and two words from the old lingua franca Nheengatu, kariba 'white man' and tupana 'God' (forms also shared with Yuri), there are 25 words recorded with a gloss or context. Several of these have good comparisons with Yuri or its sister language Ticuna:

Carabayo	Yuri
tʃʼau-, tʃʼu- 'I, my'	tʃʼau-, tʃʼu- 'I, my' (also Tikuna)
hono 'boy'	ona, oné 'son'
tʃʼaunoβe 'warm me'	tʃʼau- + nore 'warm'
ao 'father'	? (h)ato, atu 'father' (but see Ticuna below)
hako 'well!' ('bites!'?)	? (h)okó 'I am fine, this is good, beautiful' (but see 'bite' below)
tʃʼauameni 'good, well, like'	? tʃʼau- + (su)mêniko '(my) heart' (but see below)

Carabayo	Tikuna
tʃʼauameni 'good, well, like'	tʃʼau na me nii (1SG 3SG good be) 'I like it' (lit. 'it is good to me')
ɡudda 'wait!'	ŋɯ̀ná 'wait! not yet'
pinə 'prawn'	pinɯ 'prawn'
aɡó 'bring!'	a ŋe 'bring it!' (3SG bring)
pine-ɡó 'bring prawns!'	pinɯ na ŋe 'bring prawns!'
ɡu 'yes'	ŋɯ 'yes'
ɲe 'no'	ɲé (emphatic negation)
-nate 'father'	natɯ 'father'
amá 'come!'	ɲiama 'let us follow'
pama 'there, look!'	paamà 'quick!, hurry up!'
ao (how children call their father)	a o (how children and parents call each other)
ɲa 'out' (perhaps from ɲa kariba 'out, white man!)	na ɲa (3SG out) 'get out!'
aua (calling a child)	na ũã (3SG go) 'come here!, move!'
ɲa-nauué 'give me, show me'	ɲia na uué (EXH 3SG lower) 'lower it (your hand)!'
hako! 'bite'(?)	ja ŋo (EXH eat) 'eat!', na ŋo (3SG eat) 'he eats'
ʃàma 'enough!'	? tama (negation), ʃama (1SG)
kariba dimene 'white man' + 'kill'(?) ('they will kill us'?)	tɯma̰ni (1PL.kill.AGV) 'our killers', dɯmení 'look!'

According to Seifart & Echeverri (2014), the greater number of matches with Tikuna reflects the poverty of the data for Yuri, and the fact that Yuri speakers could not be interviewed to elicit matches, and they were able to do with Tikuna speakers. The fact that Tikuna speakers were able to recognize some of the Carabayo phrases suggests the languages are, or were once, part of a dialect continuum. However, Carabayo matches Yuri in having initial /ɡ/ where Tikuna has /ŋ/ ('bring', 'yes', 'wait'), suggesting that Carabayo may be closer to Yuri (whether or not a direct descendant of Yuri) than to Tikuna. Seifart & Echeverri (2014) conclude that the Carabayo likely descended from the Yuri and voluntarily isolated themselves during the Amazon rubber boom at the turn of the 20th century, when atrocities were being committed against the local indigenous peoples on a massive scale.

== Phonology ==
=== Consonants ===
Recorded consonants in Carabayo are as follows. Orthographical equivalents are in brackets. Phonemes in brackets are only recorded once or twice.

Carabayo consonants
		Bilabial		Alveolar		Palatal		Velar		Glottal
		voiceless	voiced	voiceless	voiced	voiceless	voiced	voiceless	voiced	Glottal
Plosive	plain	p	b	(d)	t			k	g	
Plosive	geminate			(dː ⟨dd⟩)						
Plosive	aspirate							(kʰ ⟨kh⟩)		
Fricative		(β)					j	(x)		h
Affricate						ʃ				
Approximant										
Nasal	plain				n		ɲ			
Nasal	geminate				nː ⟨nn⟩					
Flap					ɾ ⟨r⟩					
Liquid					(l)					

=== Vowels ===
Carabayo vowels
	Front	Central		Back	
	Front	short	long	short	long
Close	i			u	(uː ⟨uu⟩)
Close-mid	e			o	
Mid		ə	(əː ⟨əə⟩)		
Open	a				
