= Ticuna language =

Ticuna–Yuri language spoken in Amazon Basin

Tïcuna
- Duüxügu
- Native to: Brazil, Colombia, Peru
- Region: West Amazonas. Also spoken in Colombia, Peru.
- Ethnicity: Ticuna people
- Native speakers: 63,000 (2021)
- Language family: Tïcuna–Yuri: Tïcuna

Official status
- Official language in: Brazil (Amazonas)

Language codes
- ISO 639-3: tca
- Glottolog: ticu1245
- ELP: Tikuna
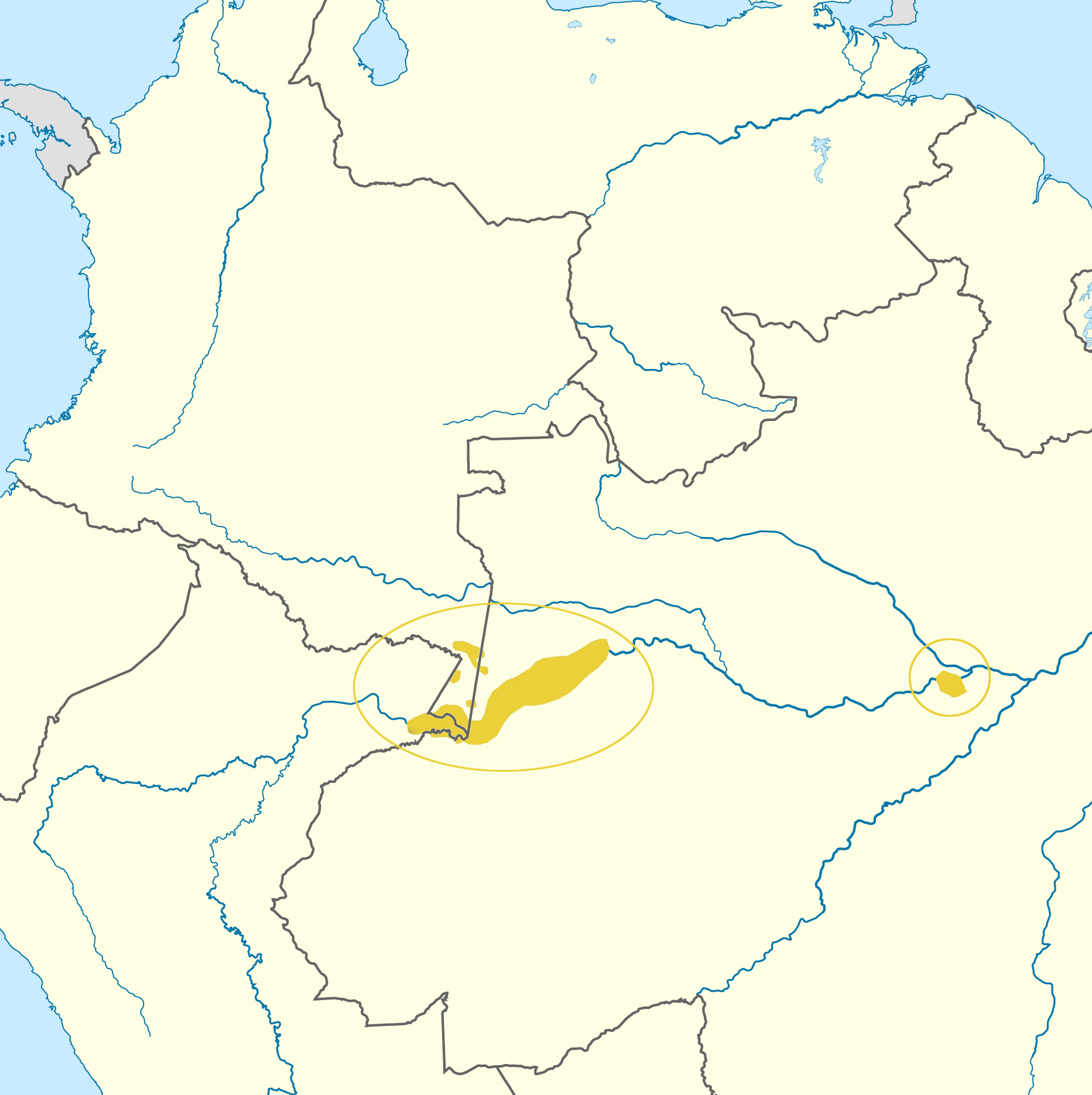
- Distribution of speakers of the Ticuna language
- Coordinates: 3°15′S 68°35′W

Ticuna (Ticuna: Duüxügu), also known as Tikuna, Tucuna or Tukuna, is a language spoken by approximately 50,000 people in the Amazon Basin, including the countries of Brazil, Peru, and Colombia. It is the native language of the Ticuna people and is considered "stable" by Ethnologue. Ticuna is generally classified as a language isolate, but is apparently related to the extinct Yuri language (see Tïcuna-Yuri) and there has been some research indicating similarities between Ticuna and Carabayo. It is a tonal language, and therefore the meaning of words with the same phonemes can vary greatly simply by changing the tone used to pronounce them.

Tïcuna is also known as Magta, Maguta, Tucuna/Tukuna, and Tukna.

== Classification ==
Some have tentatively associated the Ticuna language within the proposals of the Macro-Arawakan or Macro-Tukano stocks, although these classifications are highly speculative given the lack of evidence. A more recent hypothesis has linked Yuri-Ticuna with the Saliban and Hoti languages in the Duho stock. However, the linguistic consensus is that Ticuna may actually be considered a language isolate in its present-day situation, since Yuri is extinct.

== Sociolinguistic situation ==
=== Brazil ===
Ticuna is the Indigenous language most widely spoken in Brazil. According to the 2022 Brazilian Census, there are 51,978 speakers of the Ticuna language in Brazil, making it the largest spoken indigenous language in the country, even though it is an isolated language. Taking into consideration that the total Ticuna population in Brazil in the same census was 74,601, 69.7% still speak the Ticuna language.

Despite being home to more than 50% of the Ticunas, Brazil has only recently started to invest in native language education. Brazilian Ticunas now have a written literature and an education provided by the Brazilian National Foundation for the Indian (FUNAI) and the Ministry of Education. Textbooks in Ticuna are used by native teachers trained in both Portuguese and Ticuna to teach the language to the children. A large-scale project has been recording traditional narrations and writing them down to provide the literate Ticunas with some literature to practice with.

Ticuna education is part of a wider project carried on by the Brazilian government to provide all significant minorities with education in their own language.

In 2012, the Brazilian government launched an educational campaign for the prevention of AIDS and violence against women, the first such campaign in Brazil ever conducted in an indigenous language.

=== Peru ===
Ticunas in Peru have had native language education at least since the 1960s. They use a writing system that was, apparently, the base for the development of the Brazilian one. However, much of the literature available to Peruvian Ticunas comprise standard textbooks.

=== Colombia ===
Colombian Ticunas are taught in Spanish when education is accessible. Since the establishment of Ticuna schools in Brazil some have ventured to attend them.

=== Christian ministries ===
A number of Christian ministries have reached the Ticuna people. These ministries have translated the Bible into the native Ticuna language and even have a weekday radio show that is broadcast in Ticuna, Portuguese, and Spanish by the Latin American Ministries (LAM).

== Phonology ==
=== Vowels ===
Vowels qualities are /a e i ɨ u o/. Vowels may be nasalized and/or have creaky voice, under which tones are lowered. There are diphthongs /ai̯/ and /au̯/ that carry a single tone, contrasting with vowel sequences /ai/ and /au/ that carry two tones.

The six vowels may be nasal or laryngealized. The sixth vowel is spelled ü.

| | | Front | | Central | | Back | |
| | | oral | nasal | oral | nasal | oral | nasal |
|---|---|---|---|---|---|---|---|
| Close | plain | i | ĩ | ɨ | ɨ̃ | u | ũ |
| Close | creaky | ḭ | ḭ̃ | ɨ̰ | ɨ̰̃ | ṵ | ṵ̃ |
| Mid | plain | e | ẽ | | | o | õ |
| Mid | creaky | ḛ | ḛ̃ | | | o̰ | õ̰ |
| Open | plain | | | a | ã | | |
| Open | creaky | | | a̰ | ã̰ | | |

=== Tones ===
Ticuna is an unusually tonal language for South America, with over 10 mostly contour tones. Ticuna has one of the largest tone inventories in the world with 8–12 phonemic tones depending on the dialect. Tones are only indicated orthographically, with diacritics, when confusion is likely.

Research has suggested isolated tonal languages with complex tones are more likely to occur in regions of higher humidity and higher mean average temperature because it is believed the vocal folds can produce less consistent tones in colder, drier air. Ticuna was one of the languages of focus in this study due to its prevalence—and complexity—of tones.

=== Consonants ===
The consonants of Ticuna consist of the following phonemes:

| | | Bilabial | Dental | Palatal | Velar | Glottal |
|---|---|---|---|---|---|---|
| Plosive/ Affricate | voiceless | p | t | (tʃ~c) | k | ʔ |
| Plosive/ Affricate | voiced | b | d | (dʒ~ɟ) | ɡ | ʔ |
| Nasal | | m | n | ɲ | ŋ | |
| Liquid | | | | ɾ | | |
| Glide | | w | | j | | |

Natively, Ticuna has no lateral or uvular consonants, although /l/ is found in some Spanish loanwords.

The affricate /dʒ/ (spelled "y") may be pronounced as /ɟ/, and also /j/, but only before the vowel /a/. A central /ɨ/ vowel sound may also be pronounced as a back [ɯ] sound. Other sounds, /f s x l/ are found in Spanish loans.

Consonants may also be glottalized. Glottal stop is spelled x.

== Orthography ==
The letters of the Ticuna alphabet are as follows:

Ticuna alphabet
| a | b | c | ch | d | e | g | i |
| m | n | ng | ñ | o | p | q | r |
| t | u | ü | w | x | y | | |

Letters f, j, k, l, s, v, z are used in Spanish loanwords.

Nasalization is indicated with a tilde, and laryngeal vowels with a macron below.

=== Literacy ===
Besides its use at the Ticuna schools, the language has a dozen books published every year, both in Brazil and Peru. Those books employ a specially devised phonetic writing system using conventions similar to those found in Portuguese (except for K instead of C and the letter Ñ instead of NH) instead of the more complex scientific notation found, for instance, at the Language Museum.

In school Ticuna is taught formally. Children in schools typically in areas of Catholic Missionaries are also taught either Portuguese or Spanish as well.

== Morphology ==
Ticuna is a fairly isolating language morphologically, meaning that most words consist of just one morpheme. However, Ticuna words usually have more than one syllable, unlike isolating languages such as Vietnamese. Typologically, Ticuna word order is subject–verb–object (SVO), though unusually this can vary within the language.

== Syntax ==
Ticuna displays nominative/accusative alignment, with person, number, noun class, and clause type indexed on the verb via proclitics. Transitive and unergative verbs tend to favor an Subject-(Object)-Verb word order, while unaccusative verbs show a preference for Verb-Subject word order.

== Vocabulary ==
| Ticuna Word | Meaning |
|---|---|
| Wüxi | One |
| Taxre | Two |
| Tomaxixpü | Three |
| Ãgümücü | Four |
| Wüxi mixepüx | Five |
| Naixmixwa rü wüxi | Six |
| Naixmixwa rü taxre | Seven |
| Naixmixwa rü tomaxixpü | Eight |
| Naixmixwa rü ãgümücü | Nine |
| Guxmixepüx | Ten |
| Chatü | Man |
| Ngexüi | Woman |
| Airu | Dog |
| Iake | Sun |
| Tawēmake | Moon |
| Dexá | Water |

The counting words in Ticuna imply a base five system of counting as the word for five is the combination of "one five". Six through nine all contain the same beginning "naixmixwa rü" and then append the values for one through four respectively (such that six is "naixmixwa rü" and "wüxi" meaning one).

=== Examples ===
An example of spoken Ticuna can be found here.

| Phrase | Meaning |
|---|---|
| Nuxmaxē pa corix | general greeting spoken to a man ("sir") |
| Nuxmaxē pa chiurax | general greeting spoken to a woman ("madam") |
| Nuxmaxē pa yimax | general greeting spoken to a man ("fellow") |
| Nuxmaxē pa woxrecü | general greeting spoken to a woman ("girl") |
| Nuxmaxē pa pacüx | general greeting spoken to a young woman ("miss") |
| Nuxmaxē pa chomücüx | general greeting spoken to a friend |
| Nuxmax | general greeting spoken to a stranger |
| Ngexta cuxū? | Where are you going? (spoken to one person) |
| Ngexta pexī? | Where are you going? (spoken to a group) |
| Ngexta ne cuxū? | Where are you coming from? (spoken to one person) |
| Ngexta ne pexī? | Where are you coming from? (spoken to a group) |
