= Yurí language =

Extinct language of Brazil

Yurí
- Xurúpixuna
- Native to: Brazil, extending slightly into Colombia
- Region: Caquetá river
- Era: 19th-20th century developed into Carabayo?
- Language family: Ticuna–Yurí: Yurí

Language codes
- ISO 639-3: None (mis)
- Glottolog: juri1235
- Coordinates: 1°50′S 69°0′W

Yurí (Jurí) is a language previously spoken near a stretch of the Caquetá River in the Brazilian Amazon, extending slightly into Colombia. It was spoken on the Puré River of Colombia, and the Içá River and Japurá River of Brazil.

A small amount of data was collected on two occasions in the 19th century, published in 1853 and 1867. Kaufman (after Nimuendajú) notes that there is good lexical evidence to support a link with Ticuna in a Ticuna–Yurí language family, though the data had never been explicitly compared as of 2010.

It is commonly assumed that the Yuri people and language survive among the uncontacted people or peoples of the Rio Puré region, now the Río Puré National Park. Indeed, "Yuri" is often used as a synonym for the only named people in the area, the Carabayo. A list of words collected in 1969 from the Carabayo, only recovered in 2013, suggests the language is close to Yuri, though perhaps not a direct descendant.
