= Mosan languages =

Hypothetical language family

Mosan
- (hypothetical)
- Geographic distribution: British Columbia, Washington
- Linguistic classification: Algonquian–Wakashan ?
- Subdivisions: Chimakuan †; Salishan; Wakashan

Language codes
- Glottolog: None

Mosan is a hypothetical language family consisting of the Salishan, Wakashan, and Chimakuan languages of the Pacific Northwest region of North America. It is attributed to Edward Sapir in the 1929 Encyclopædia Britannica, though it was proposed at least as far back as 1920 by Leo Frachtenberg. Little evidence has been adduced in favor of such a grouping, no progress has been made in reconstructing it, and it is now thought to reflect a language area rather than a genetic relationship. The term persists outside academic linguistic literature because of Sapir's stature.

An automated computational analysis (ASJP 4) by Müller et al. (2013) found lexical similarities between Salishan and Chimakuan. Wakashan was not included. However, since the analysis was automatically generated, the grouping could be either due to mutual lexical borrowing or genetic inheritance.

== External relationships ==
Michael Fortescue suggested in 1998 that Nivkh might be related to the Mosan languages of North America. Later, in 2011, he argued that Nivkh, which he referred to as an "isolated Amuric language", was related to the Chukotko-Kamchatkan languages, forming a Chukotko-Kamchatkan–Amuric language family. However, Glottolog considers the evidence to be "insufficient".

In 2015, Sergei Nikolaev argued in two papers for a systematic relationship between Nivkh and the Algic languages of North America, and a more distant relationship between these two together and the Wakashan languages of coastal British Columbia.

== Vocabulary ==
Below is a comparison of reconstructions of selected basic vocabulary items in Proto-Salishan, Proto-Wakashan, and Proto-Chimakuan.

Abbreviations

- K = Proto-Kwakiutlan
- N = Proto-Nootkan

gloss	Proto-Salishan	Proto-Wakashan	Proto-Chimakuan
head	*q’ʷum	*t’uχʷ-/*t’uq-; *-qiː	*-t̍ikʷ
hair	*t’amin 'fur, feathers'		*míɬkʷ; *-sini; *q̍a-, *q̍a (?)
eye		*ğas-	*ɬaq̍ʷo (?)
ear	*t’ani/aʔ	*p’ayp’ay(ʔiː)/*p’asp’ay(ʔiː)	
nose		*-‘i(ː)ɬba(ː)/*-’i(ː)ɬta(ː)	*-os
tooth		*gi(ː)g-/*gi(ː)k-	
tongue	*tixʷc	*k’ulm	*-ɬito
mouth	*s-pl-ucin	*-aqs(iɬ)/*-’aqs(iɬ)	*pil-
hand	*kalax	K *ʔay̍asu/*hay̍asu	*-t̍ay
foot	*q’ʷax̆/x̆ʷ	*-(k)si(ː)(s)/*-kc’i(ː)ɬ; *gʷi(ː)gʷi(ː)	*law̍-
breast	*s-qam	K *zam̍a, N *ʔanma	*máqas (?)
meat		K *ʔlz-/ʔls-	
blood	*cay	N *ƛaːƛaːw̍aqmis	*can-
bone	*s-c’ụ/ạm; *q’awał	*χa(ː)x/*χa(ː)xaq-	*q̍a-
person	*qal-mixʷ	*-as	*póʔoqʷo
name	*kʷac, *kʷast	K *λiq-	*t̍ísoqʷoɬ
dog	*s-qax̆aʔ	N *q’iniːƛ(č)	*kináno
fish	*ciłn	*m̍iː-	
louse	*qʷətíx̆aʔ	*ği(ː)x(k)-	
tree	*cəq, *ʕ/ɣap (also 'stand')	*suč’(as)	*hám̍aʔa; *ya- 'tree, wood'
leaf	*packl		*-ɬi
flower	*p’aq’-m	*luːlačχ-/*laː(ʔ)ulačx-	
water	*qʷuʔ, *ʔuqʷ, *qu/al	N *č’a(ʔakʷ)	*-c̍i, *-c̍o; *-sina
fire	*yəqʷ, *həyqʷ 'fire(wood)'	*ʔana(kʷ)	*-so; *-spa
stone	*s-xanx	K *luʔχʷk’ʷs	*k̍áλ̍a, *k̍át̍ia
earth	*tmixʷ 'world, nature, earth'	K *t’k-	*c̍iq̍át- 'ground, world, universe'
salt		*dum-	
road		*t’ax-	*-ɬimt
eat	*ʔup; *ʔił(t)n	*ha(ː)w̍(a)-/*ham̍(a)-	*-lax̣
die	*ƛ’lal	K *-‘alis(m); N *qaχ-	*k̍ʷiq-

== See also ==
- Algonquian–Wakashan languages (Almosan)
