= Timote language =

Language of Timote–Cuica, Venezuela

Timote–Cuica
- Migurí
- Native to: Venezuela
- Region: Mutús
- Ethnicity: Timoto-Cuica people
- Native speakers: (200? cited 1977, Mutú)
- Language family: Language isolate
- Dialects: Timote; Cuica; ?Mutú (Loco)

Language codes
- ISO 639-3: ([MUF] retired in Ethnologue 15)
- Glottolog: timo1237 Timote-Cuica
- Linguasphere: 81-LAA
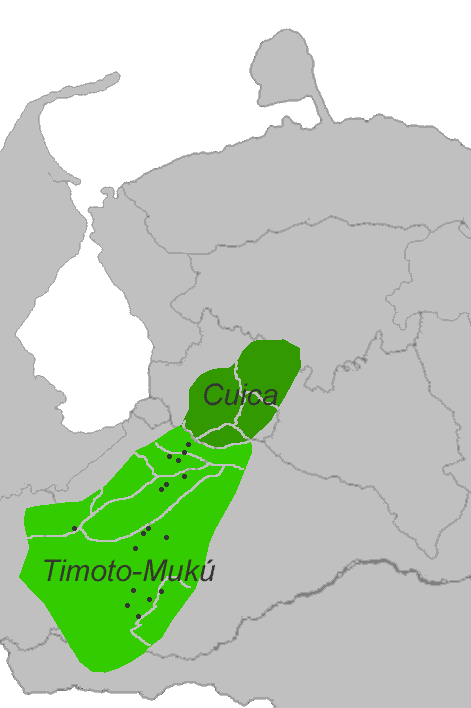

Timote, also known as Timote–Cuica, is the language of the Timote–Cuica state in the Venezuelan Andes, around the present city of Mérida and south of Lake Maracaibo.

== Geographical distribution ==
Cuica was spoken from Humocaro in Lara to Jajó in Trujillo, and Timote was spoken in the Motatán and Chama river valleys from Timotes to La Grita in Táchira state.

== History ==
At the time of Spanish contact, the Timote and Cuica, who were agriculturalists, inhabited the modern-day states of Mérida and Trujillo in Venezuela. It is said that the Cuicas received the Spaniards in a friendly manner, while the Timotes were more warlike. Descendants of these peoples reside in a number of villages in the region, but are thought to have lost their distinct languages in the early 20th century. However, in 1977, a report by Merrill Seely references a language supposedly spoken in the locality of Mutús, "above" Pueblo Llano Municipality in Mérida state. This language would "almost certainly" be Timote, the original language of the region. The name Timote itself is derived from ti-motɨ 'Mutú speakers'. mutú or mukú is a common toponym in the region, possibly meaning 'people', 'community', or 'village', and was so common that scholar Julio César Salas "saw it as a suitable replacement for the name Timote".

=== Documentation ===
Around the beginning of the 20th centiury, a number of local scholars collected data on the Timote language. These include Tulio Febres Cordero, Amílcar Fonseca, and José Ignacio Lares. These data were compiled and discussed by Paul Rivet (1927). Alfredo Jahn (1927) also collected anthropological data, along with documentation of the language.

== Classification ==
Timote shows no immediately apparent similarities with the nearby Arawakan, Cariban, and Chibchan languages. Rivet (1927) compared vocabulary from Timote and Cuica with Páez and a number of Chibchan languages, with a few similarities visible but "no overall picture", according to Willem Adelaar and Pieter Muysken (2004). Marcelo Jolkesky (2016) identifies some lexical similarities with the Jirajaran languages.

== Dialects ==
There is no certainty on whether or not Timote and Cuica were dialects of a single language or distinct from each other. Jahn (1927), who collected data on Timote, claimed that Timote and Cuica were one and the same language, and his data correspond quite closely with the "Cuica" examples collected by Fonseca.

Mucuchí–Marripú is another dialect of Timote; Campbell (2012) distinguished them as separate languages.

== Phonology ==
Consonant clusters, somewhat unusual for the area, are found word-initially, especially in Cuica: kču 'bird', stots 'blood', Timote klef 'rainy season', hutn 'dog'.

== Vocabulary ==
A possible Quechua loanword is present in Timote in the word Fotuto, referring to a shell trumpet.

=== Numerals ===
Timote has an obviously decimal numeral system.

Gloss	Timote	Cuica
1	karí	
2	xem, xen	
3	šut, sut, hisxut	šuent
4	pit	pití
5	kabó, kabok	kamó
6	kasum, kaksúm, kapsún	katseunt
7	mai-xem, mai-xén	ma-en
8	mai-xut, mai-sxut	mabi-šuent
9	mai-pit	mabi-pita
10	tabís	
