= Terrence Kaufman =

American linguist (1937–2022)

- Kaufman in 1986
- Born: Terrence Scott Kaufman; June 12, 1937; Portland, Oregon, US
- Died: March 3, 2022 (aged 84)
- Occupation: Linguist
- Title: Professor Emeritus
- Spouse: Elaine Diana Marlowe (m. 1964–1972)

Academic background
- Education: University of Chicago, BA, 1959; University of California, Berkeley, PhD, 1963
- Thesis: Tzeltal Grammar (1963)
- Academic advisors: William F. Shipley, Mary Haas

Academic work
- Era: 21st century
- Discipline: Linguistics and anthropology
- Sub-discipline: Mesoamerican
- Institutions: University of Pittsburgh, University of California, Berkeley

Terrence Kaufman (June 12, 1937 – March 3, 2022) was an American linguist who specialized in lexicography, Mesoamerican historical linguistics, the documentation of unwritten languages, and language contact phenomena. In the 1960s to the 2000s, he was considered a central figure in documenting Indigenous languages in Mexico and Central America. He served as professor emeritus of linguistics and anthropology at the University of Pittsburgh.

== Early life and education ==
Kaufman was born on June 12, 1937 in Portland, Oregon to James Edward Kaufman (1906–1991), a mechanic, and Mary Katherine Kaufman (née Burman; 1910–2001). Kaufman was of Russian German descent on his father’s side. Kaufman had one brother.

Kaufman obtained a BA from the University of Chicago in 1959, and began fieldwork the following year. In 1963, Kaufman received his PhD in linguistics from the University of California, Berkeley, with a dissertation on the grammar of the Tzeltal language.

== Career ==
A drawing of the Tuxtla Statuette, whose inscriptions were analyzed in Kaufman's work

Kaufman taught at Ohio State University from 1963 to 1964, the University of California, Berkeley, from 1964 to 1970, and at the University of Pittsburgh until his retirement in 2011.

Kaufman produced descriptive and comparative historical studies of languages, including those of the Mayan, Siouan, Hokan, Uto-Aztecan, Mixe–Zoquean, and Oto-Manguean families. His work on the empirical documentation of unwritten languages, through fieldwork and training of native linguists, resulted in a substantial body of published work, as well as a large collection of unpublished notes. Many of his articles were co-authored with scholars Lyle Campbell, Sarah Thomason, and John Justeson.

In a 1976 paper co-authored with Campbell, Kaufman helped advance the theory that the Olmecs spoke a Mixe–Zoquean language. The theory was based on the significant presence of early Mixe–Zoquean loan words in many Mesoamerican languages, particularly from specific, culturally significant semantic domains. Along with Campbell and Thomas Smith-Stark, Kaufman carried out research published in Language (1986) which led to the recognition of Mesoamerica as a linguistic area.

In his book Language Contact, Creolization, and Genetic Linguistics (1988), Kaufman and Thomason developed a theoretical framework on the mechanisms of contact-induced language-change.

In 1993, along with John Justeson, Kaufman claimed to have successfully deciphered the Isthmian or Epi-Olmec script. However, this claim was refuted by anthropologists Michael Coe and Stephen Houston in 2004, after using the decipher key on a recently discovered jade mask. Coe states that the result "turns out to be total nonsense and gobbledygook".

Kaufman published in 2016 his Proto-Sapotek(an) Reconstructions, where his work in the language's reconstruction, including Zapotecan verbal morphology, contributed to a growing database of Proto-Zapotek/Sapotek(an) knowledge.

Additionally, together with a PLFM linguistic aide whom he had trained, Jo Froman, Kaufman completed his nationwide linguistic surveys and a dialect boundary mapping exercise. He then published a proposed classification for the Mayan languages. Translated and edited by Lic. Flavio Rojas Lima of the Seminario de Integración Social, PLFM volunteer, Margarita Cruz, PLFM Director, Tony Jackson, and supported by Ministry of Education language advisor, Salvador Aguado Andreut, the proposal was published in Spanish as Idiomas de Mesoamerica ('Languages of Mesoamerica'), in 1974.

A map showing Kaufman's theory of Mayan Language migration

=== Early advocate and activist for the role of native speakers ===
In the early 1970s, Kaufman visited Guatemala to conduct linguistic surveys in the Mayan highlands, leading to a proposal for a classification of the Mayan languages. He cofounded the Proyecto Lingüistico "Francisco Marroquín (PLFM, 1970-1979), which trained native speakers of Indigenous languages of Guatemala in practical linguistics, including 100 Mayan native speakers, and oversaw the documentation of twelve Mayan languages. He conducted training sessions alongside a group of doctoral students, including Nora England and Judith Maxwell. Each served for several years under the auspices of the Peace Corps to provide year-round, follow-up training.

The Mayan trainees assumed leadership of the PLFM in 1976 and worked on a new alphabet proposal for each Mayan language, named the Proposal for alphabets and orthographies for writing the Mayan languages The proposal was published in Spanish in January 1976 under Kaufman's name by the Guatemalan Ministry of Education, which supported the proposal. However, due to political polarization in Guatemala in the 1970s, the proposal faced opposition from some proponents of orthographies that imposed Spanish language orthography on the Mayan languages. A corps of PLFM Mayan linguists joined national congresses and debates. In 1987, the Congress of the Republic of Guatemala enacted legislation establishing the orthography developed by the Proyecto Lingüístico Francisco Marroquín (PLFM) as the official national alphabet. The legally adopted version incorporated a single minor modification to the original proposal.

Throughout his career, he set up field schools training linguists and community language activists in field methods for developing language scripts and documentation projects.

Kaufman also ran the El Proyecto para la Documentación de las Lenguas de Mesoamérica or the Project for the Documentation of the Languages of Mesoamerica (PDLMA, 1993-2010), with John Justeson, and Roberto Zavala Maldonado to bring many linguists together with native speakers of Mesoamerican Indigenous languages. Their goal was to document the lexicon, phonology, and morphosyntax of selected Mixe-Zoquean (also, Mije-Sokean) languages, which by 1995 was extended to all living Mixe-Zoquean languages. The PDLMA documented 30 Mesoamerican languages, and conducted dialectal surveys on five language groups.

== Personal life ==
In June 1964, Kaufman married Elaine Diana Marlowe. They later divorced in 1972.

== Selected bibliography ==
=== Articles ===
- Campbell, Lyle; Kaufman, Terrence (1976). "A Linguistic Look at the Olmec". American Antiquity. 41 (1): 80–89. doi:10.2307/279044. JSTOR 279044. S2CID 162230234.
- Campbell, Lyle; Kaufman, Terrence (1980). "On Mesoamerican linguistics". American Anthropologist. 82 (4): 850–857. doi:10.1525/aa.1980.82.4.02a00120.
- Campbell, Lyle; Kaufman, Terrence; Smith-Stark, Thomas C. (September 1986). "Meso-America as a Linguistic Area". Language. 62 (3): 530–570. doi:10.1353/lan.1986.0105. S2CID 144784988.
- Campbell, Lyle; Kaufman, Terrence (1985). "Mayan Linguistics: Where are we Now?". Annual Review of Anthropology. 14: 187–198. doi:10.1146/annurev.an.14.100185.001155.
- Justeson, John; Kaufman, Terrence (1993). "A decipherment of epi-Olmec hieroglyphic writing". Science. 259 (5102): 1703–1711. Bibcode:1993Sci...259.1703J. doi:10.1126/science.259.5102.1703. PMID 17816888. S2CID 9678265.
- Kaufman, Terrence (June 1976). "Archaeological and Linguistic Correlations in Mayaland and Associated Areas of Meso-America". World Archaeology. 8 (1: Archaeology and Linguistics): 101–118. doi:10.1080/00438243.1976.9979655.
- Kaufman, Terrence (1988). "A Research Program for Reconstructing Proto-Hokan: First Gropings". In DeLancey, Scott (ed.). Papers from the 1988 Hokan–Penutian Languages Workshop. Eugene: University of Oregon. pp. 50–168. OCLC 26917817.
- Kaufman, Terrence (1990). "Language History in South America: What we know and how to know more". In Payne, Doris L. (ed.). Amazonian Linguistics. Austin: University of Texas Press. pp. 13–74. ISBN 978-0-292-70414-5.

=== Books ===
- Justeson, John; Norman, William; Campbell, Lyle; Kaufman, Terrence (1985). The Foreign Impact on Lowland Mayan Language and Script. Middle American Research Institute Publication. Vol. 53. ISBN 0939238829.
- Kaufman, Terrence (1972). El Proto-Tzeltal-Tzotzil. Fonología comparada y diccionario reconstruido. México: UNAM. ISBN 978-9683666253.
- Thomason, Sarah G.; Kaufman, Terrence (1988). Language contact, creolization, and genetic linguistics. Berkeley: University of California Press. ISBN 0-520-07893-4.
