= Ticuna–Yuri languages =

Proposed language family of western Amazon

Ticuna–Yuri
- Geographic distribution: western Amazon
- Linguistic classification: One of the world's primary language families: Ticuna–Yuri
- Subdivisions: Ticuna; Yuri †; Carabayo

Language codes
- Glottolog: ticu1244

Ticuna–Yuri is a small family, perhaps even a dialect continuum, consisting of at least two, and perhaps three, known languages of South America: the major western Amazonian language Ticuna, the poorly attested and extinct Yurí, and the scarcely known language of the largely uncontacted Carabayo, which it may be a descendant of. Kaufman (2007: 68) also adds Munichi to the family.

Kaufman (1990, 1994) argues that the connection between the two is convincing even with the limited information available. Carvalho (2009) presented "compelling" evidence for the family.

== Language contact ==
Jolkesky (2016) notes that there are lexical similarities with the Andoke-Urekena, Arawak, Arutani, Máku of the Auari River, and Tukano language families due to contact.

== Bibliography ==
- Anderson, D. (1962). Conversational Ticuna. Yarinacocha: Summer Institute of Linguistics.
- Anderson, Lambert (1961). "Vocabulario breve del idioma ticuna". Tradición. 8 (21): 53–68.
- de Alviano, F. (1944). Gramática, dictionário, verbos e frases e vocabulário prático da léngua dos índios ticunas. Rio de Janeiro: Imprensa Nacional.
- Goulard, Jean Pierre; Rodríguez Montes, María Emilia (2013-11-28). "Los Yurí / Juri-Tikuna, en el complejo socio-lingüistico del noroeste amazónico". LIAMES: Línguas Indígenas Americanas (in Portuguese). 13 (1): 7–65. doi:10.20396/liames.v0i13.1531. ISSN 2177-7160.
- Montes Rodríguez, María Emilia (2004). Morfosintaxis de la lengua tikuna (Amazonía colombiana). Lenguas aborígenes de Colombia Descripciones (1st ed.). Bogotá: Univ. de los Andes [u.a.] ISBN 978-958-695-147-0.
