= Cambarysu =

Device purportedly used by a Brazilian tribe

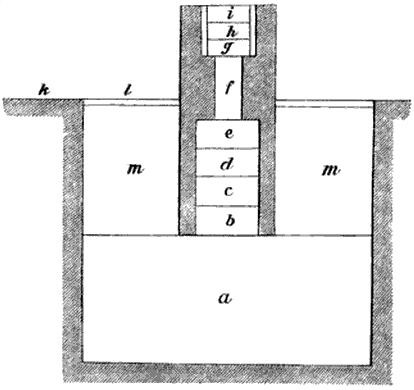
Cross-section of the device, from an article by Enrico Hillyer Giglioli.

The cambarysu was a drum which Jose Bach said he saw the Catuquinaru tribe of Brazil use, when he visited them in 1896–97, to communicate between villages.

It consisted of a hollow palm-wood cylinder about 1 m deep and 40 cm in diameter, filled with a layer of fine sand at the bottom, then a layer of pieces of wood, pieces of bone, and pulverised mica, with a narrow empty space above it, capped by leather, then wood, and then rubber on top. It was half buried in a hole in the ground, surrounded by pieces of wood, bone and other debris (covered at ground level with rubber), and resting on a bed of packed coarse sand.

Bach reported that one was located in the house of the chief of each village, and that when the device was drummed, the vibrations (travelling through the earth) could be heard (only) on the devices in other villages, up to 1.5 km away. In the late 1890s and early 1900s, several journals reported on the device, although some scholars expressed scepticism that it existed and functioned as described, as no other Europeans reported it.
