= Catuquinarú language =

Extinct language of Brazil

Catuquinarú
- Catuquinaru-Bach
- Native to: Brazil
- Region: Amazonas
- Ethnicity: Catuquinaru
- Era: attested 1890s
- Language family: unclassified

Language codes
- ISO 639-3: None (mis)
- Glottolog: catu1242

Catuquinaru or Catuquinarú is the extinct and unclassified language of the Catuquinaru tribe of Brazil, preserved in a few words collected by Jose Bach and published by G. E. Church in 1898. The name is a common derivative of Catuquina. Loukotka, among others, includes it among the Tupi languages, describing the people as Tupinized Catuquina. However, the little preserved vocabulary does not resemble that of the Tupi languages, Catuquinan languages, or Panoan languages (compare Panoan Catuquina).

== Vocabulary ==
The original and only recorded vocabulary of Catuquinarú is presented below.

Catuquinarú vocabulary
Gloss	Catuquinarú
head	tacasú
hair	anahé
eyes	cesá
nose	tinoá
mouth	agahó
teeth	canha
neck	yayoruá
breast	putia
shoulders	copey
arm	yanó
stomach	maricau
eyebrows	namÿ
legs	getemaupú
feet	pihú
hands	punÿ
house/maloca	ocausú
white man/Christian	carynosú
large boat	moracatÿ
hammock/net	ouÿsauarusú
arrows	uhÿnasú
bow	uhÿnarasúcó
poison for arrows	orarÿ
earthen pot	comatÿnú
copal gum	ananÿ
water	uhehÿ

Some recorded phrases are as follows:

Guabila-guateli-téna? 'What tribe do you belong to?'

Amago-hépÿ 'We belong to this'

Acó 'No, I don't want it, I am not agreed'

Honaytÿ 'I want it, I accept'

Bach reported that the Catuquinaru used a coded version of their language to communicate over distances of up to 1.5 km via drums called cambarysus.
