= Drums in communication =

Drums used for long-distance signalling and communications

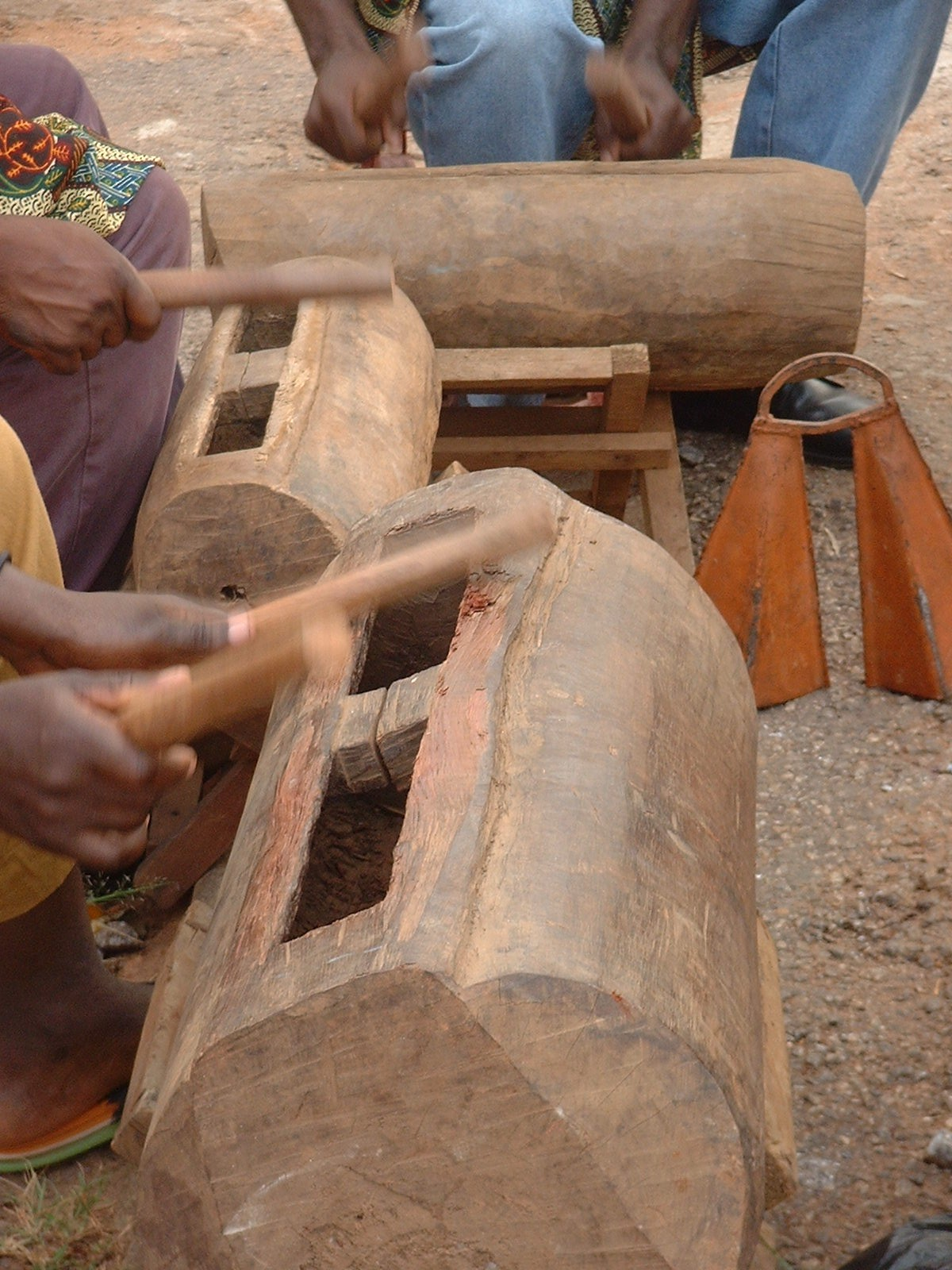
Bamileke people tamtam

Developed and used by cultures living in forested areas, drums served as an early form of long-distance communication, and were used during ceremonial and religious functions.

== Types ==
=== Talking drum ===
While the tone and articulation of the hourglass-shaped talking drum can be finely controlled, it cannot be heard at distances beyond a gathering or market-place, and it is primarily used in ceremonial settings. Ceremonial functions could include dance, rituals, story-telling and communication of points of order.

In Africa, New Guinea and tropical areas of America, people have used drum telegraphy for centuries to communicate over long distances. When European expeditions came into the jungles to explore, they were surprised to find that people already knew they were coming and what their intentions were. By repeating a message in turn from one nearby location to another, African drummers can transmit that message a total distance of 100 miles in about an hour.

Among the famous communication drums are the drums of West Africa (see talking drum). From regions known today as Nigeria and Ghana they spread across West Africa, and to the America and the Caribbean during the slave trade. There they were banned because they were being used by the slaves to communicate over long distances in a code unknown to their enslavers.

Talking drums were also used in East Africa and are described by Andreus Bauer in the 'Street of Caravans', about his time as a security guard in the Wissmann Truppe for the caravan of Charles Stokes.

Some of the groups of variations of the talking drum among West African ethnic groups:

- Tama (Wolof of Senegal)
- Gan gan, Dun Dun (Yoruba of Nigeria and eastern Benin)
- Dondo (Akan of central Ghana and Côte d'Ivoire)
- Lunna (Dagomba of northern Ghana; Mossi of Burkina Faso)
- Kalangu (Hausa of northern Nigeria, Niger, northern Ghana, Benin and Cameroon)
- Doodo (Songhai and Zarma of Mali, Burkina Faso, and Niger)

In the 20th century the talking drums have become a part of popular music in West Africa, especially in the music genres of Jùjú (Nigeria) and Mbalax (Senegal).

=== Slit gongs ===
Message drums, or more properly slit gongs, with hollow chambers and long, narrow openings that resonate when struck, are larger all-wood instruments hollowed out from a single log. Slit-log drums are common in the drum communication systems of Papua New Guinea, where they are known in Tok Pisin as garamut. Variations in the thickness of the walls give varying tones when struck by the heavy wooden drum sticks. While some are simple and utilitarian, they can also be highly elaborate works of sculpture while still retaining their function.

A long slit is cut in one side of a log, then it is hollowed out through the slit, leaving lips (wooden ledges) on each side of the opening. Using a larger log enables a louder sound that can be heard over longer distances. By hollowing more under one lip and less under the other, the drum can be tuned to produce two different notes, a lower and a higher one. The drum's lips are hit with sticks, beating out rhythms of high and low notes. Small stands are often placed under each end of the drum to keep it off the ground and let it vibrate more freely.

Under ideal conditions, the sound can be understood at five to eleven kilometres (3–7 mi), but interesting messages usually get relayed on by the next village. Drums used by the Bulu people of Cameroon might be heard as far away as 10 to 15 miles at night, compared to three to four during daytime.

=== Cambarysu ===
The Catuquinaru tribe of Brazil reportedly used a drum called the cambarysu to send vibrations through the ground to other cambarysus up to 1.5 km away. Some scholars expressed skepticism about the claim that it sent vibrations through the ground (rather than the air), and about the claim that it existed.

== What is transmitted ==
Two different types of traditional drum communication are found in Africa. The first type associates each idea with a particular rhythmic pattern, and the second type represents spoken utterances by mimicking their accentual profiles.

Drum communication methods are not languages in their own right, though they can be based on spoken languages. In such cases, the sounds produced are conventionalized or idiomatic signals based on speech patterns. The drummed messages are normally very stereotyped and context-dependent; speakers of true languages have the ability to form new combinations and expressions that will immediately be understood by the listener, but that is not the case in drum communication.

In Central and East Africa, drum patterns represent the stresses, syllable lengths and tone of the particular language. In tone languages, where syllables are associated with a certain tone, some words are distinguished only by their suprasegmental profile. Therefore, syllable drum languages can often transfer a message using the tonal phonemes alone.

In certain languages, the pitch of each syllable is uniquely determined in relation to adjacent syllables. In these cases, messages can be transmitted as rapid beats at the same speed as speech, as the rhythm and melody both match the equivalent spoken utterance.

Misinterpretations can occur due to the highly ambiguous nature of the communication. The ambiguity is reduced by context effects and the use of stock phrases. For example, in Jabo, most stems are monosyllabic. By using a proverb or honorary title to create an expanded version of the name of a person, animal, or object, the indistinguishable single beat of an ordinary name can be replaced with a particular rhythmic and melodic motif for each subject. In practice not all listeners understand all of the stock phrases; the drum language is understood only to the level of each person's immediate concern.

== See also ==
- Communication
- Drum
- Gong
- Slit drum
- Talking drum
- Whistled language
