= Bamileke people =

Ethnic group in Central Africa

Bamileke
bˈɑː mˈiː lˈe͡ɪ kˈe͡ɪ
- Flag of the Bamileke National Movement

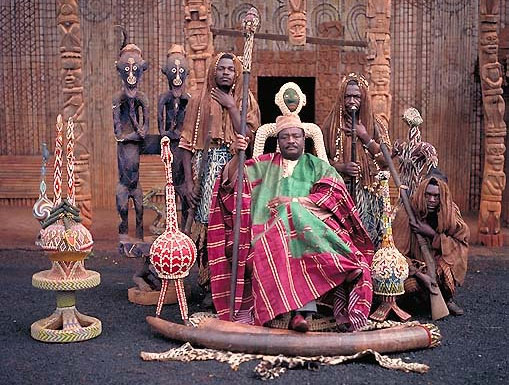
- King of Bandjoun, one of the numerous Bamileke Kingdoms in Cameroon

Regions with significant populations
- Cameroon: 8,454,475 (20.8%)

Languages
- Bamileke Languages, French, English, Pidgin

Religion
- Grassfields beliefs and ancestral worship (dual system: Divinities-based, and Ancestors-based), Christianity, Islam

Related ethnic groups
- Bafia, Bamum, Tikar, other Grassfields peoples

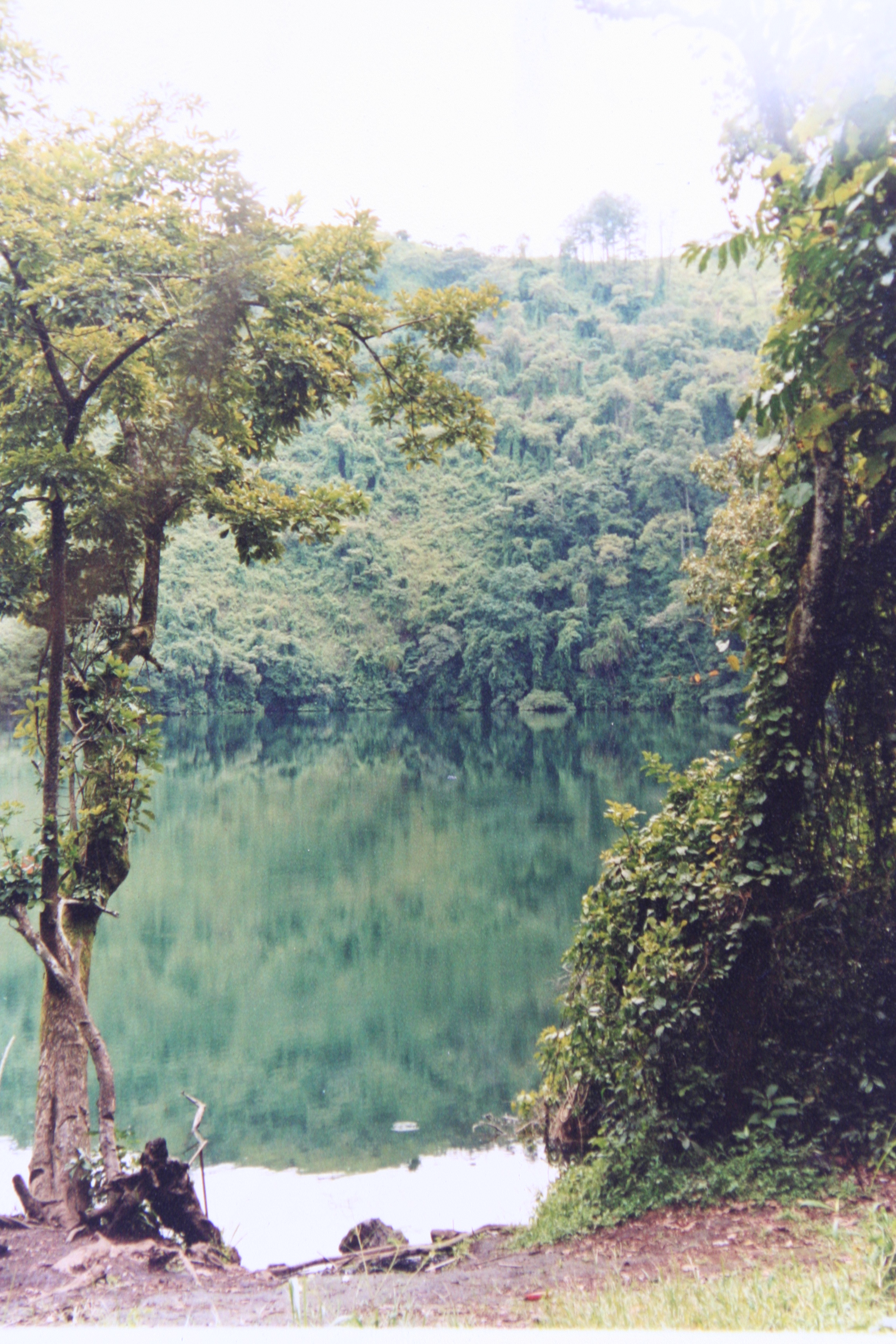
Lac Baleng, tourist area located in the western region where one little beyond the water which marries the face of the surrounding nature.

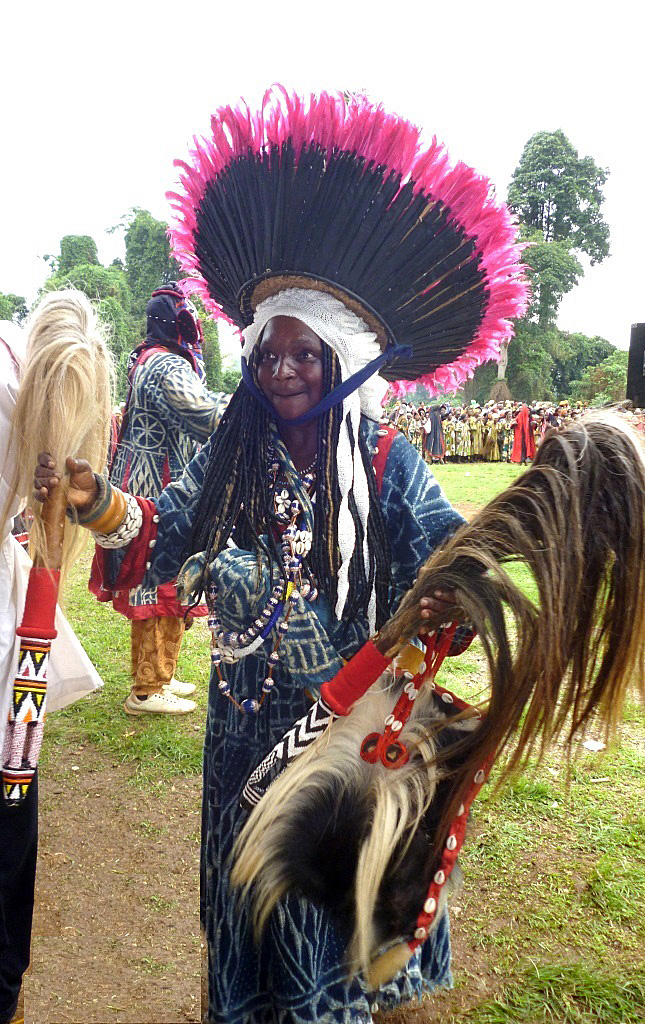
Woman "Mafo" at the funeral of a Bamileke chief - West Cameroon

The Bamiléké people are an ethnic group of Central Africa that inhabits the Western High Plateau colloquially known as the grassfields of Cameroon. According to Dr John Feyou de Hapy, Bamiléké means "people of faith".

== Languages ==
The Bamileke languages are Grassfields languages that belong to the Southern Bantoid branch of the Niger-Congo language family.

== History ==
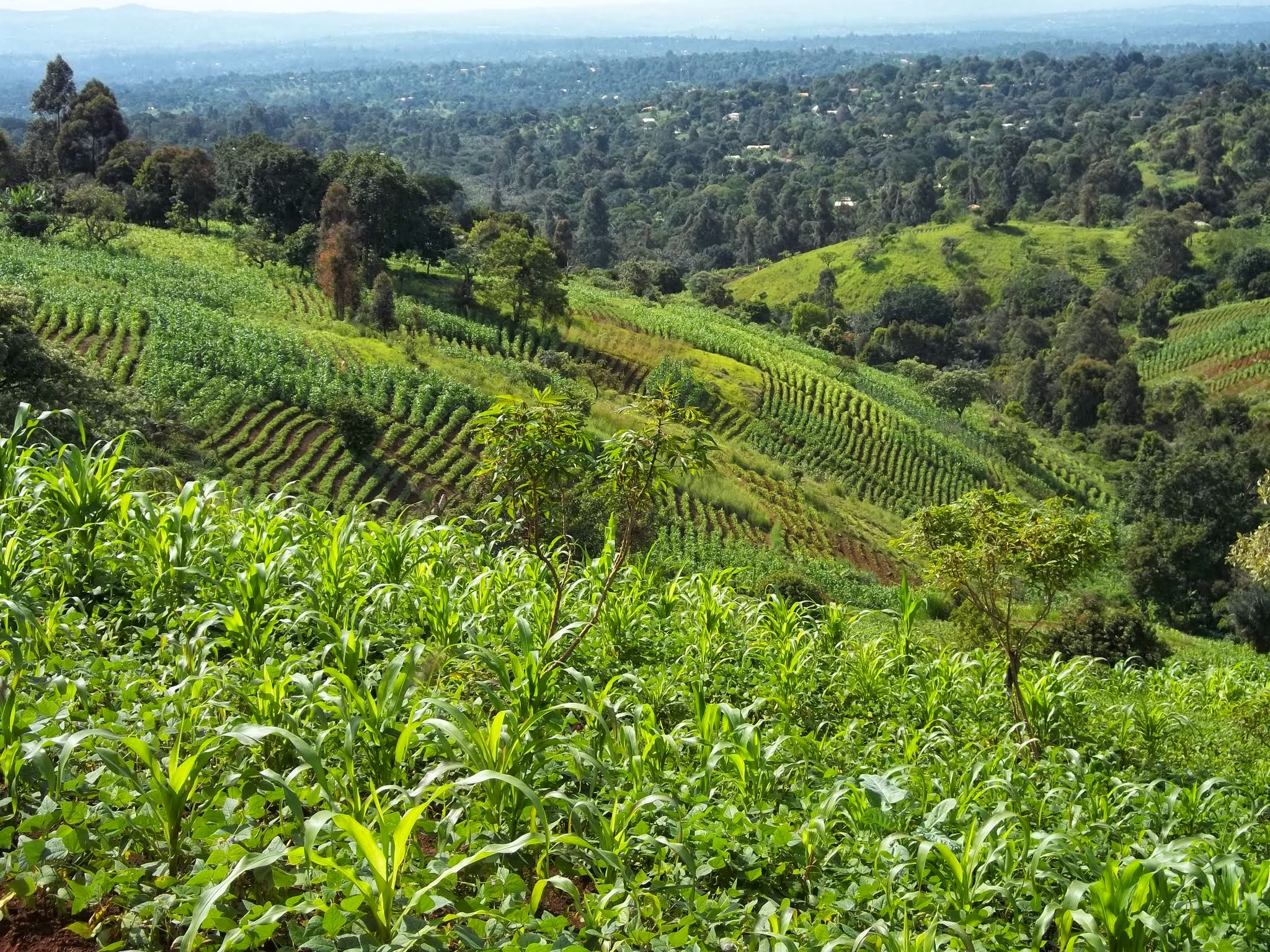
Bamiléké Grassland

Most Bamiléké historical narratives detail an origin along the Nile River in what is now Sudan. A survey examining the methods and instruments of communication among the Bamilekes show a common origin with populations along the Nile.

Oral tradition collected by Alexis Maxime Feyou de Happy and his son, Joseph, suggested that the arrival of the Bamiléké in Western Cameroon occurred in multiple waves with two primary routes. The first route originated in the North between the Lake Tchad area and the Nile Valley. The second route originated in Nigeria around the Cross River area. Anthropologists G. Spedini and C. Bailly theorized that the Bamileke descend from the Ndobo, "Sudanic savanna dwellers who migrated into Western Cameroon from the north."

According to some Bamiléké oral traditions, they are descendants of a Mbum princess named Wouten (also called Betaka) who helped establish the Tikar fondom sometime in the 13th century after being expelled from Ngan Ha, the capital of Mbum following a succession dispute. The Mbum who migrated to their current location from Northern Cameroon are the ancestors of all Grassfields people and now reside in the Adamawa province of Cameroon.

In the 17th century, the Bamiléké migrated further south and west under the pressure of the Chamba and Fulani people. When Cameroon was colonized, the British granted status and a certain amount of control to traditional authorities, such as the Fon. This was due to a colonial policy known as indirect rule. On the other hand, the Germans and French looked at Fons with contempt and were often suspicious of them.

According to research compiled in The Historical Dictionary of the Republic of Cameroon, the "Bamiléké have a reputation of being excellent farmers and business-persons. While they have become a significant factor in the national economy, their success has also generated some jealousy and resentment, especially among the original inhabitants of areas where Bamiléké migration occurred."

A number of Black people across the Americas, such as Erykah Badu and Jessica Williams, have traced their lineage back to the Bamiléké people through genetic testing.

== Genetics ==
In one genetic study, Bamileke-related genetic variations were found throughout Central, Southern and East Africa. The researchers caution the assumption that the Bamileke are the source of the Bantu migration because the genetic variations in the region could have been very different 4000 years ago. The study found that the genetic structure of populations in Cameroon are not completely defined by language groups. The Yemba who are Grassfields people clustered closely to Northern Bantoid speakers. The Mbo who speak a Narrow Bantu language clustered closely with Grassfields speakers. Some of the Bamileke who speak Grassfields languages clustered closely with Narrow Bantu speakers. Within Northern and Grassfields groups, fine-structured analysis distinguished populations living less than 20 km from each other. The study also found that the Shum Laka population cluster closer to Central African rainforest hunter-gatherers than they do to Grassfields populations, and components from Northeast, Northwest, Eastern, Western and Central Africa that contributed to the genomes of Grassfields groups.

== Lifestyle and settlement patterns ==
=== Political structure and agriculture ===
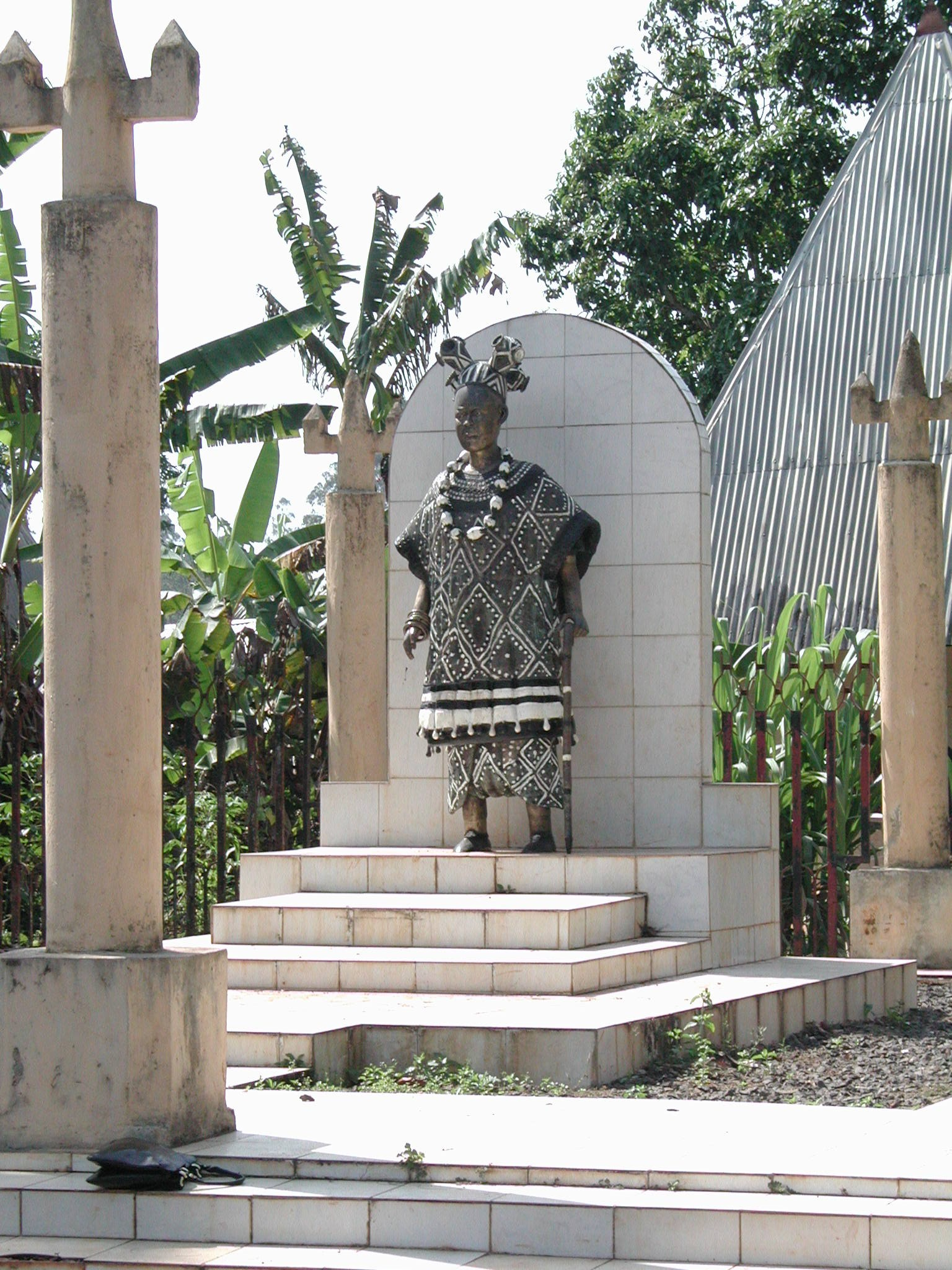
Statue of a chief at Bana

Bamiléké settlements follow a well-organized and structured pattern. Houses of family members are often grouped together and surrounded by small fields. Men typically clear the fields, but it is largely women who work them. Most work is done with tools such as machetes and hoes. Staple crops include cocoyams, groundnuts and maize.

Bamiléké settlements are organized as chiefdoms. The chief, or fon or fong is considered as the spiritual, political, judicial and military leader. The chief is also considered the 'father' of the chiefdom. He thus has great respect from the population. The successor of the 'father' is chosen among his children. The successor's identity is typically kept secret until the fon's death.

The fon typically has 9 ministers and several other advisers and councils. The ministers are in charge of the crowning of the new fon. The Council of Ministers, also known as the Council of Notables, is called Kamveu. In addition, a "queen mother" or mafo was an important figure for some fons in the past. Below the fon and his advisers lie several ward heads, each responsible for a particular portion of the village. Some Bamileke groups also recognize sub-chiefs, or fonte.

=== Economic activities ===
Traditional homes are constructed by first erecting a raffia-pole frame into four square walls. Builders then stuff the resulting holes with grass and cover the whole building with mud. The thatched roof is typically shaped into a tall cone. In the present day, however, this type of construction is mostly reserved for barns, storage buildings, and gathering places for various traditional secret societies. Instead, modern Bamileke homes are made of bricks of either sun-dried mud or of concrete. Roofs are usually made of metal sheeting.

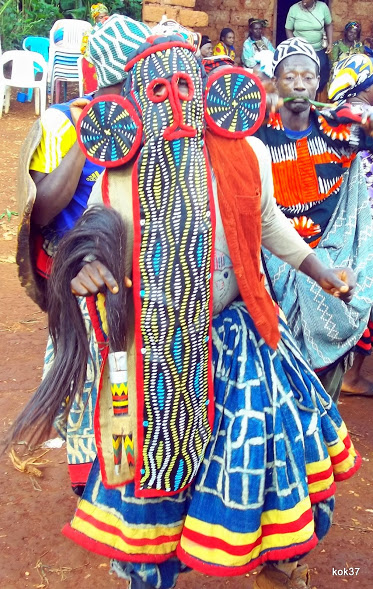
Performers enacting a zing, a funeral dance, at Bamougong with elephant mask

=== Religious beliefs ===
During the colonial period, parts of the Bamileke region adopted Christianity, though some of them practice Islam. Today, the dominant form of worship is still ancestral with most Bamileke practicing Veneration of the ancestors. Death is always met with mystery, and the family is required to turn the body over to an examiner to determine the cause of death. After this is completed, the family must gather at the home. Each member must step up to the totem and swear that they were not involved in the death of the loved one. It is believed that if someone in the room really is the murderer, the totem will trap their spirit forever. To satisfy the Ancestors, the person believed to be a murderer must perform a special ritual that consists of the pouring out of libation during the burial ceremony. The family will then gather the wet earth and shape it into a circle. This is seen as a metaphorical skull of the deceased, blessed by libation.

The Bamileke also believe that the Ancestor's spirit still remains within the actual skulls of the Ancestors as well, so they keep possession of them. The oldest male in the family keeps the skulls of both male and female ancestors in a dwelling that the family built and a diviner has blessed. In the event that a skull is not well preserved, a special ritual must be performed that consists of the pouring out of libation.

The Bamileke are known for elaborate elephant masks used in dance ceremonies or funerals to show the importance of the deceased person. During the homegoing celebration of King Njoya's mother in 1913, elephant masks were worn by those in attendance.

=== Music ===
The Bamileke people developed their own musical style, Tsamassi, which was popularised by André-Marie Tala.

== Royal tradition and the arts ==
Masquerades are an integral part of Bamileke culture and expression. Colorful, beaded masks are donned at special events such as funerals, important palace festivals and other royal ceremonies. The masks are performed by men and aim to support and enforce royal authority.

The power of a Bamileke king, called a Fon, is often represented by the elephant, buffalo, and leopard. Oral traditions proclaim that the Fon may transform into either an elephant or leopard whenever he chooses. An elephant mask, called a mbap mteng, has protruding circular ears, a human-like face, and decorative panels on the front and back that hang down to the knees and are covered overall in beautiful geometric beadwork, including triangular imagery. Isosceles triangles are prevalent, as they are the known symbol of the leopard. Beadwork, shells, bronze, and other precious embellishments on masks elevate the mask's status. On occasion, a Fon may permit members of the community to perform in an elephant mask along with a leopard skin, indicating a statement of wealth, status, and power being associated with this masquerade.

Buffalo masks are also very popular and present at most functions throughout Grassland societies, including the Bamileke. They represent power, strength and bravery, and may also be associated with the Fon.

=== Beadwork ===
Beadwork is an essential element of Bamileke art and distinguishes it from other regions of Africa. It is an art form that is highly personal in that no two pieces are alike and are often used in dazzling colors that catch the eye. They may be an indication of status based on what kinds of beads are used. Beadwork utilized all over on wooden sculptures is a technique that is unique only to the Cameroon grasslands.

Before they were colonized, popular beads were obtained from Sub-Saharan countries like Nigeria and were made of shells, nuts, wood, seeds, ceramic, ivory, animal bone, and metal. Colonization and trade routes with other countries in Europe and the Middle East introduced brightly colored glass beads as well as pearls, coral and rare stones like emeralds. These came at a price, however. There were often agreements with these other countries to exchange these precious luxury commodities for slaves, gold, oil, ivory and some types of fine woods.

=== Sculpture and pottery ===
An analysis of Bamileke sculpture found that artists do not produce but create. For the Bamileke, statues, reliefs and paintings represent life forces that safeguard intangible attributes of death that allow them to live eternally. For the Bamileke, sculptors are intermediaries who are charged with realizing God's vision through the depiction of symbols and signs. Another study performed by Djoukwo and Wang found that pottery creation among the Bamiléké is used as a form of art therapy.

=== Succession and kinship patterns ===
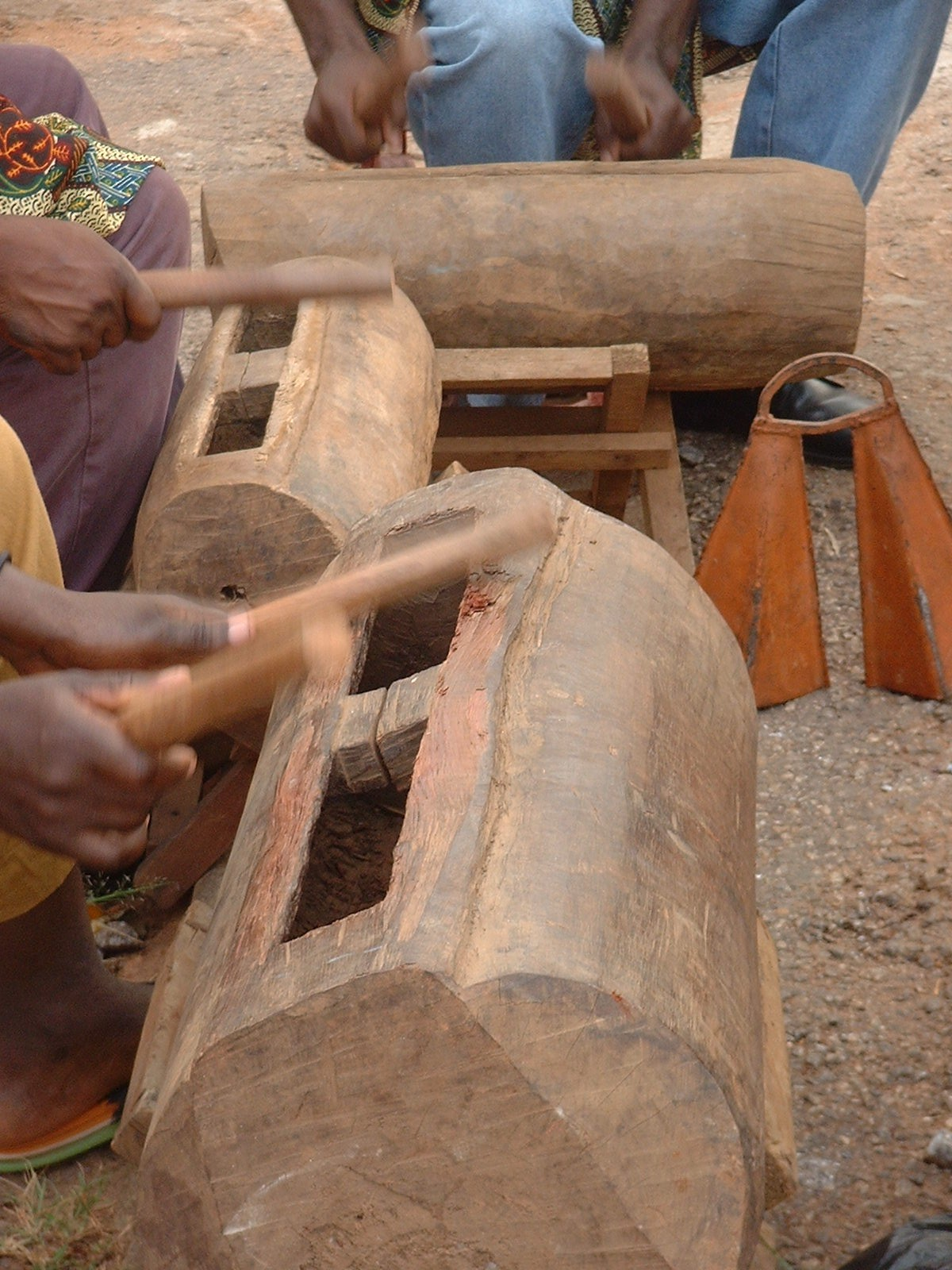
Bamileke tamtam

The Bamileke trace their ancestry, inheritance and succession through the male line, and children belong to the fondom of their father. After a man's death, all of his possessions typically go to a single, male heir. Polygamy (more specifically, polygyny) is practiced, and some important individuals may have literally hundreds of wives. Marriages typically involve a bride price to be paid to the bride's family.

It is argued that the Bamileke inheritance customs contributed to their success in the modern world:

"Succession and inheritance rules are determined by the principle of patrilineal descent. According to custom, the eldest son is the probable heir, but a father may choose any one of his sons to succeed him. An heir takes his dead father's name and inherits any titles held by the latter, including the right to membership in any societies to which he belonged. And, until the mid-1960s, when the law governing polygamy was changed, the heir also inherited his father's wives--a considerable economic responsibility. The rights in land held by the deceased were conferred upon the heir subject to the approval of the chief, and, in the event of financial inheritance, the heir was not obliged to share this with other family members. The ramifications of this are significant. First, dispossessed family members were not automatically entitled to live off the wealth of the heir. Siblings who did not share in the inheritance were, therefore, strongly encouraged to make it on their own through individual initiative and by assuming responsibility for earning their livelihood. Second, this practice of individual responsibility in contrast to a system of strong family obligations prevented a drain on individual financial resources. Rather than spend all of the inheritance maintaining unproductive family members, the heir could, in the contemporary period, utilize his resources in more financially productive ways such as for savings and investment. [...] Finally, the system of inheritance, along with the large-scale migration resulting from population density and land pressures, is one of the internal incentives that accounts for Bamileke success in the nontraditional world".

Donald L. Horowitz also attributes the economic success of the Bamileke to their inheritance customs, arguing that it encouraged younger sons to seek their own living abroad. He wrote in Ethnic groups in conflict: "Primogeniture among the Bamileke and matrilineal inheritance among the Minangkabau of Indonesia have contributed powerfully to the propensity of males from both groups to migrate out of their home region in search of opportunity".

== Notable individuals ==
Here is a list of notable Bamileke or people of Bamileke descent:

- Julius Akosah, Cameroonian soccer player
- Benoît Angbwa
- Adrian Awasom, American football player
- Erykah Badu, American singer-songwriter, record producer and actress
- Kadji Defosso, industrialist
- Mathias Djoumessi, president of the UPC political party
- Victor Fotso, industrialist
- Maurice Kamto, former president of the UN International Law Commission, international lawyer, professor
- Patrice Nganang, writer and professor of Africana
- Francis Ngannou, Mixed martial artist, UFC Heavyweight Champion
- Ernest Ouandié, independence fighter
- Pascal Siakam, professional basketball player
- Ndamukong Suh, American football player
- Patrick Suffo, Former international football player
- Wilglory Tanjong, entrepreneur and author
- Sam Fan Thomas, Makossa musician
- Frank Tsadjout
- Chris Tucker, actor and comedian
- Jessica Williams, American actress and comedienne
- SZA, American singer songwriter, of Bamileke descent through her mother
- Oprah Winfrey, American talk show host, television producer, actress, author, and philanthropist

== Gallery ==
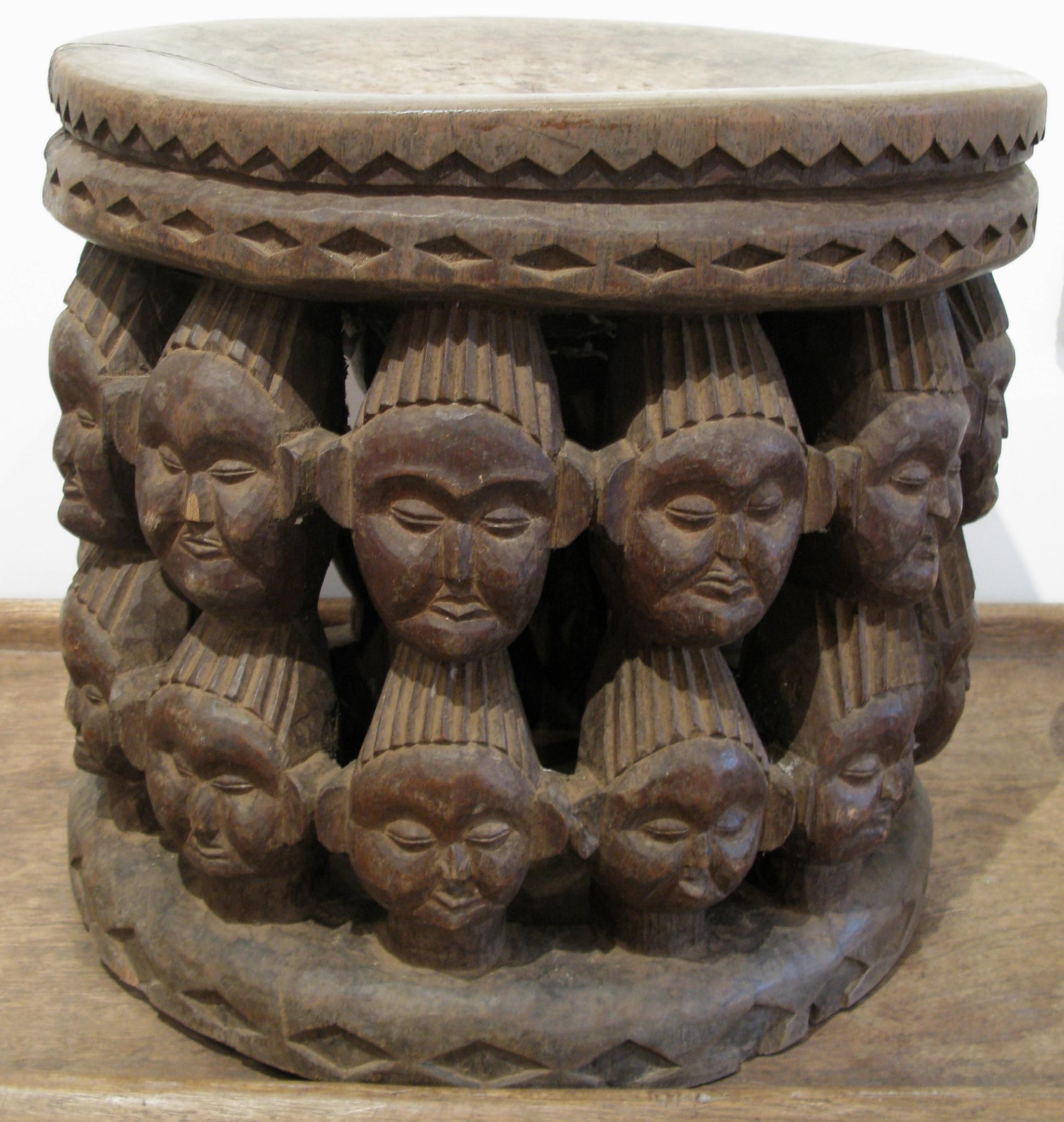
Stool used by notables of the Fon's (kings) of the Bamileke court

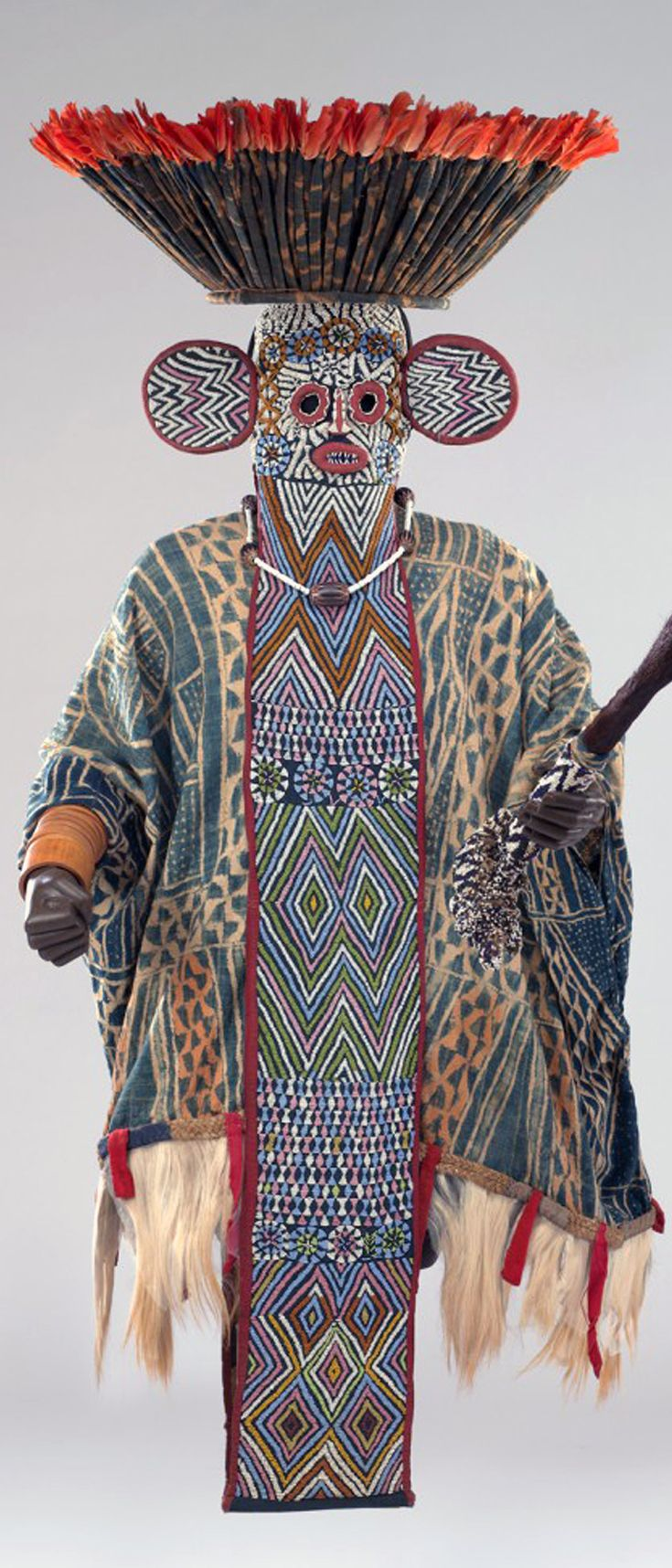
Elaborate Mask Ensemble of the Kuosi Society

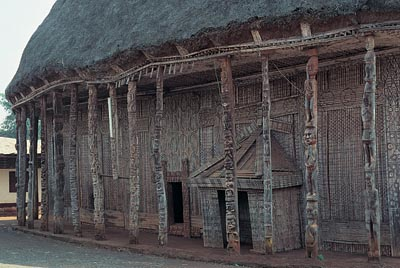
Traditional Bamileke architecture, depicting impressive wooden structures. Remnants of Bamileke civilisation

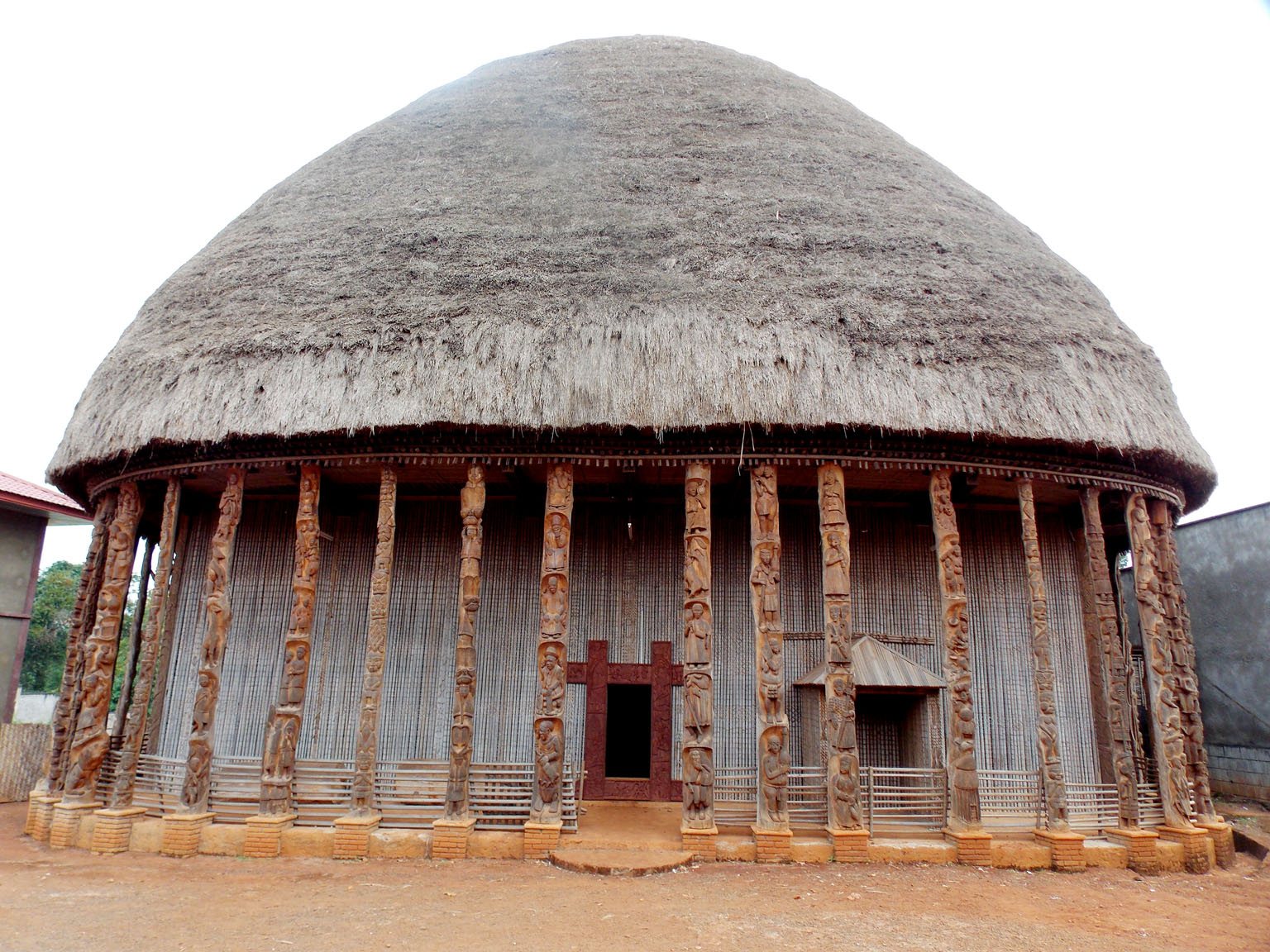
Traditional Bamileke architecture, the Bandjoun Great House

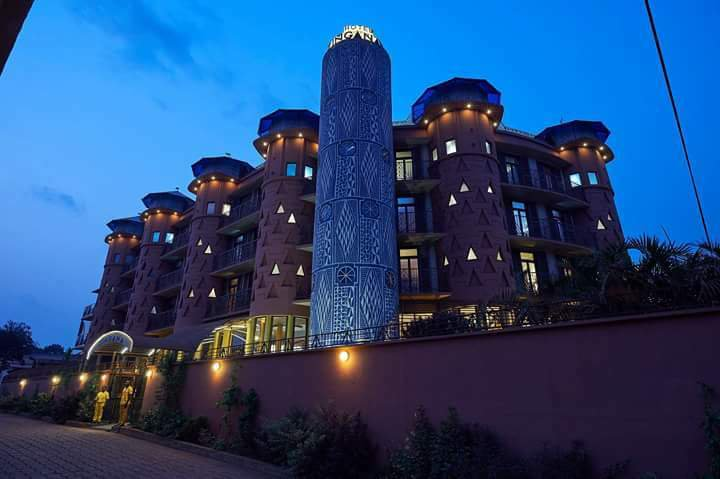
A modern building replicating portions of Bamileke architecture. Zingana Hotel, Bafoussam

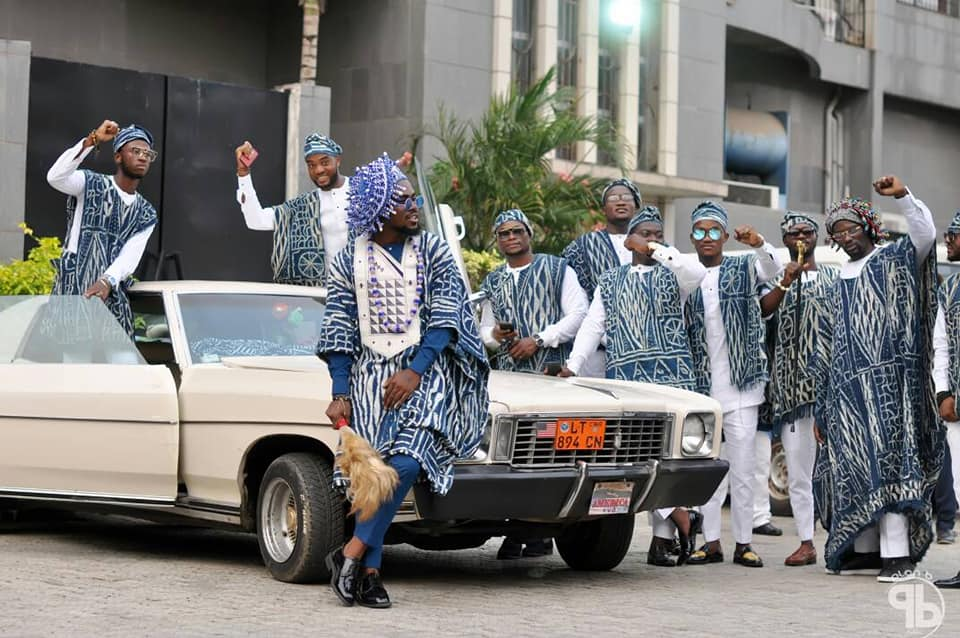
Young men wearing traditional Bamileke attire during a marriage ceremony

Bamileke Dance Groups

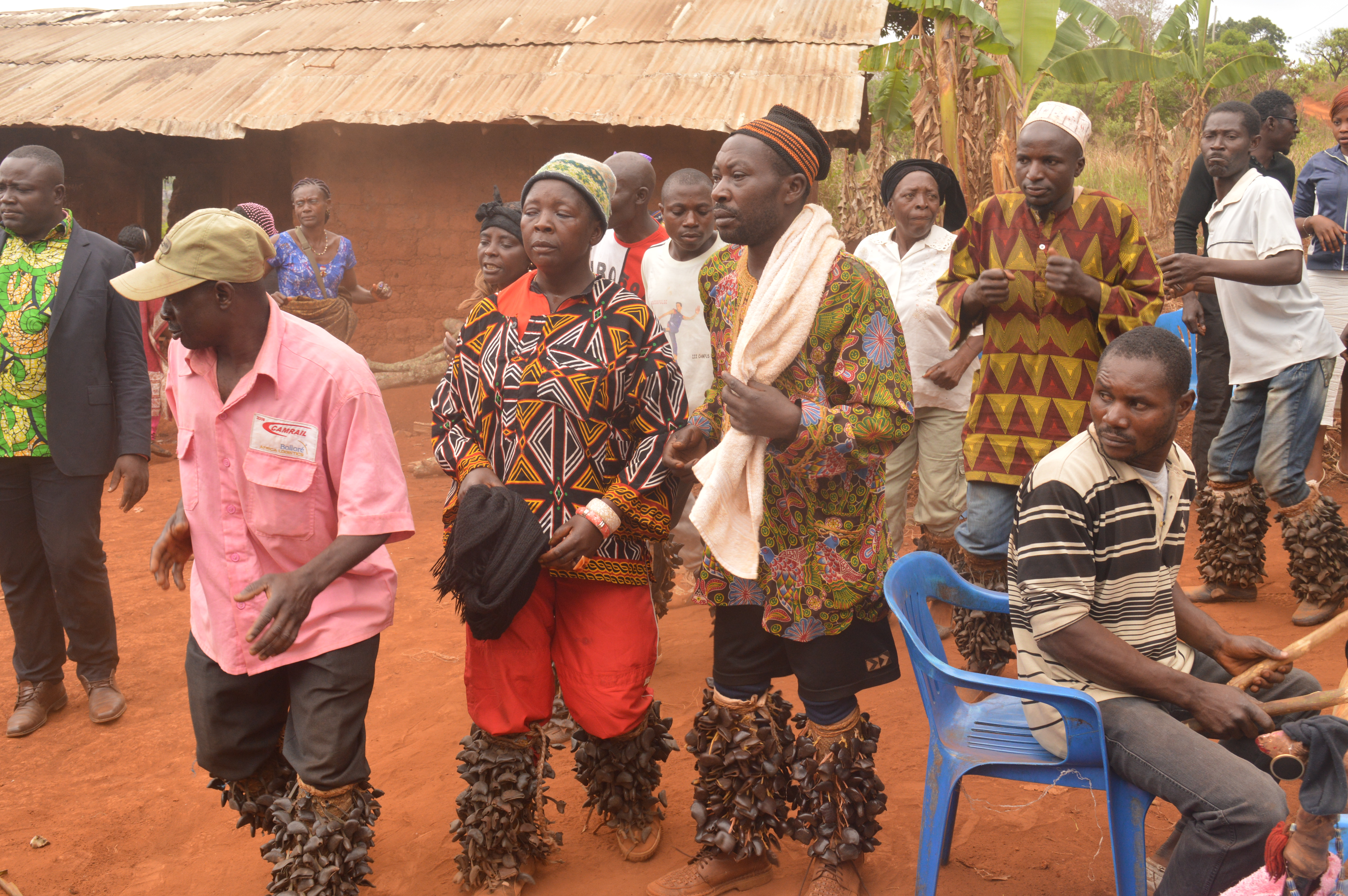

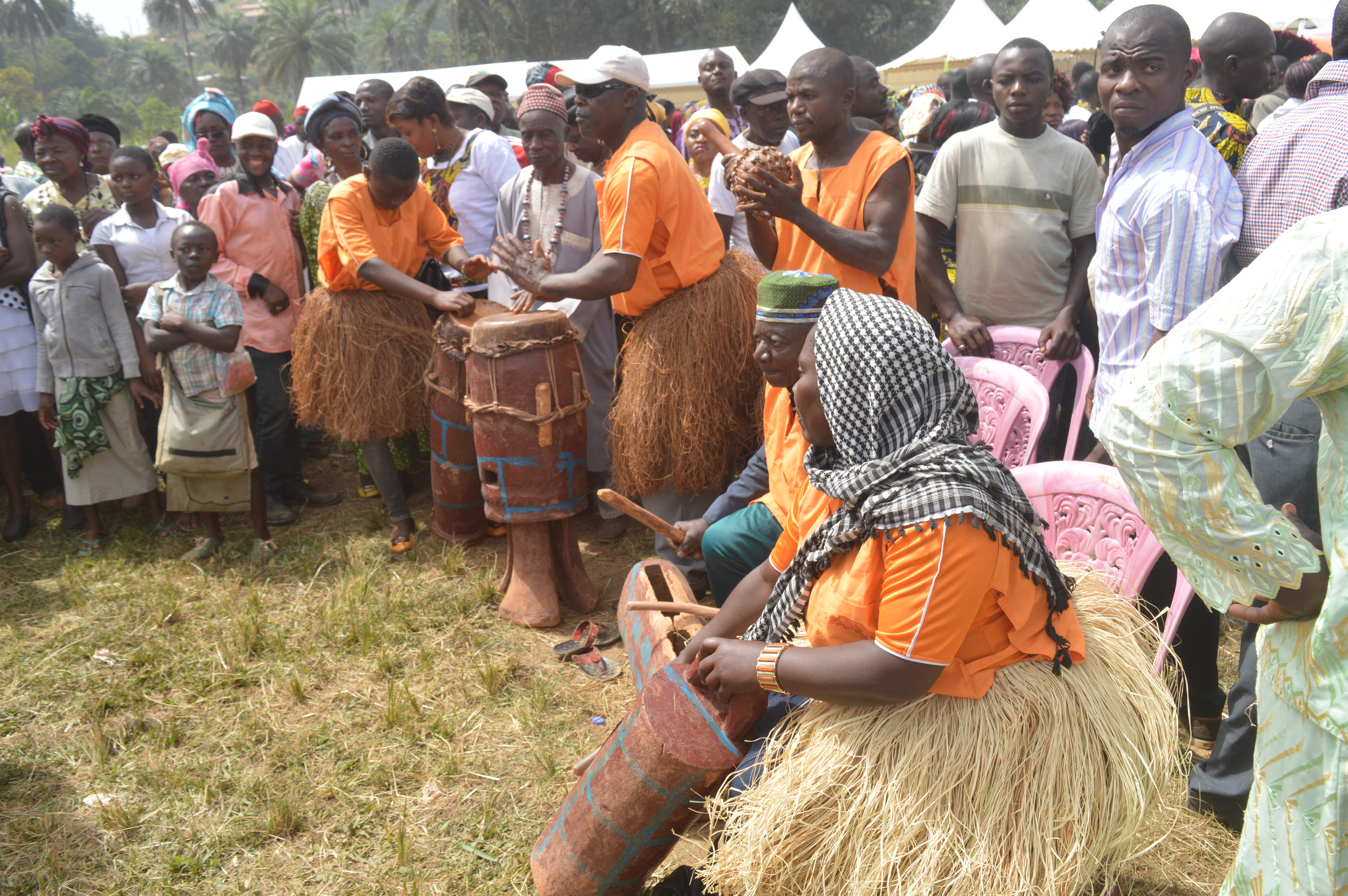

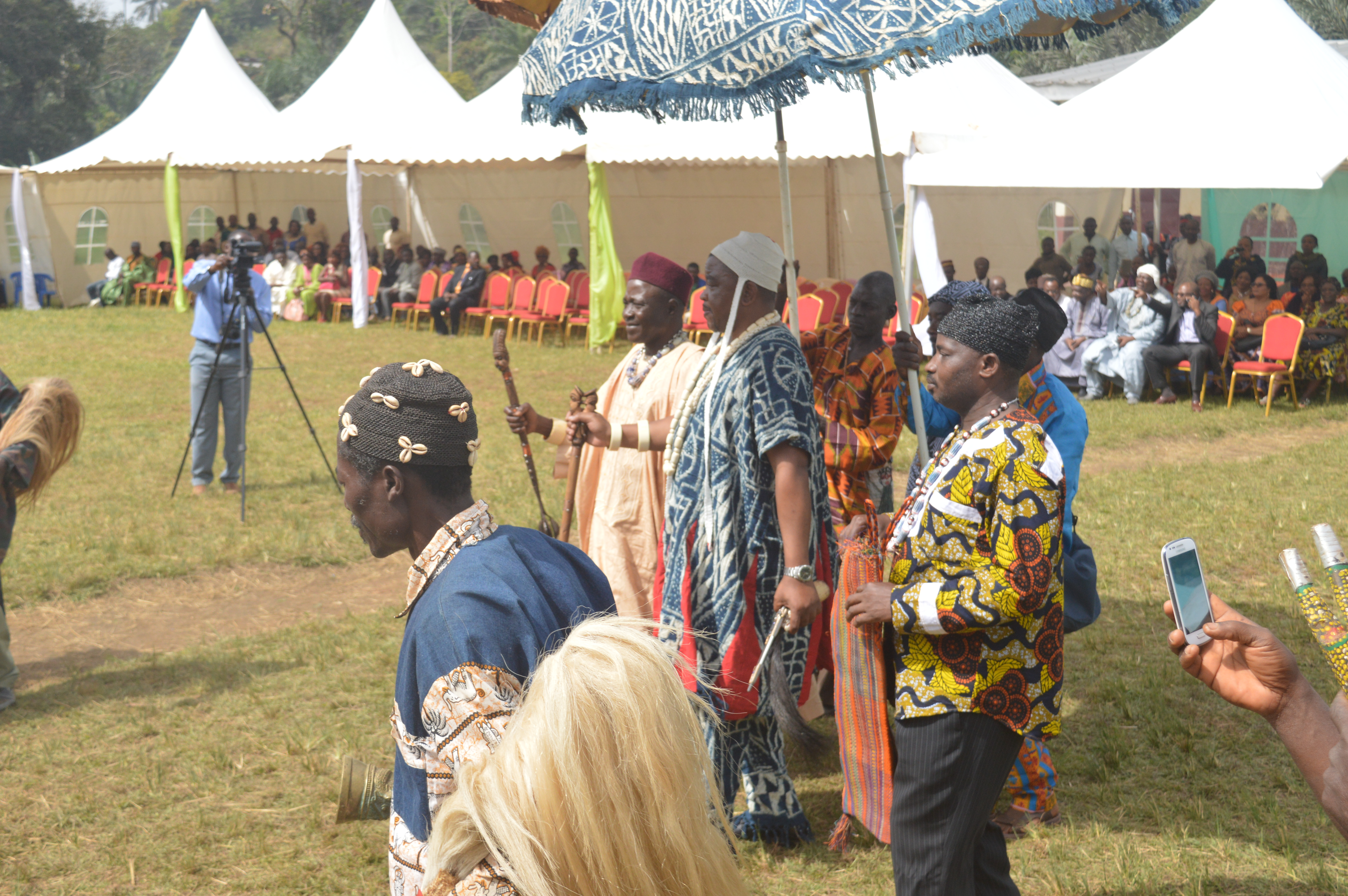

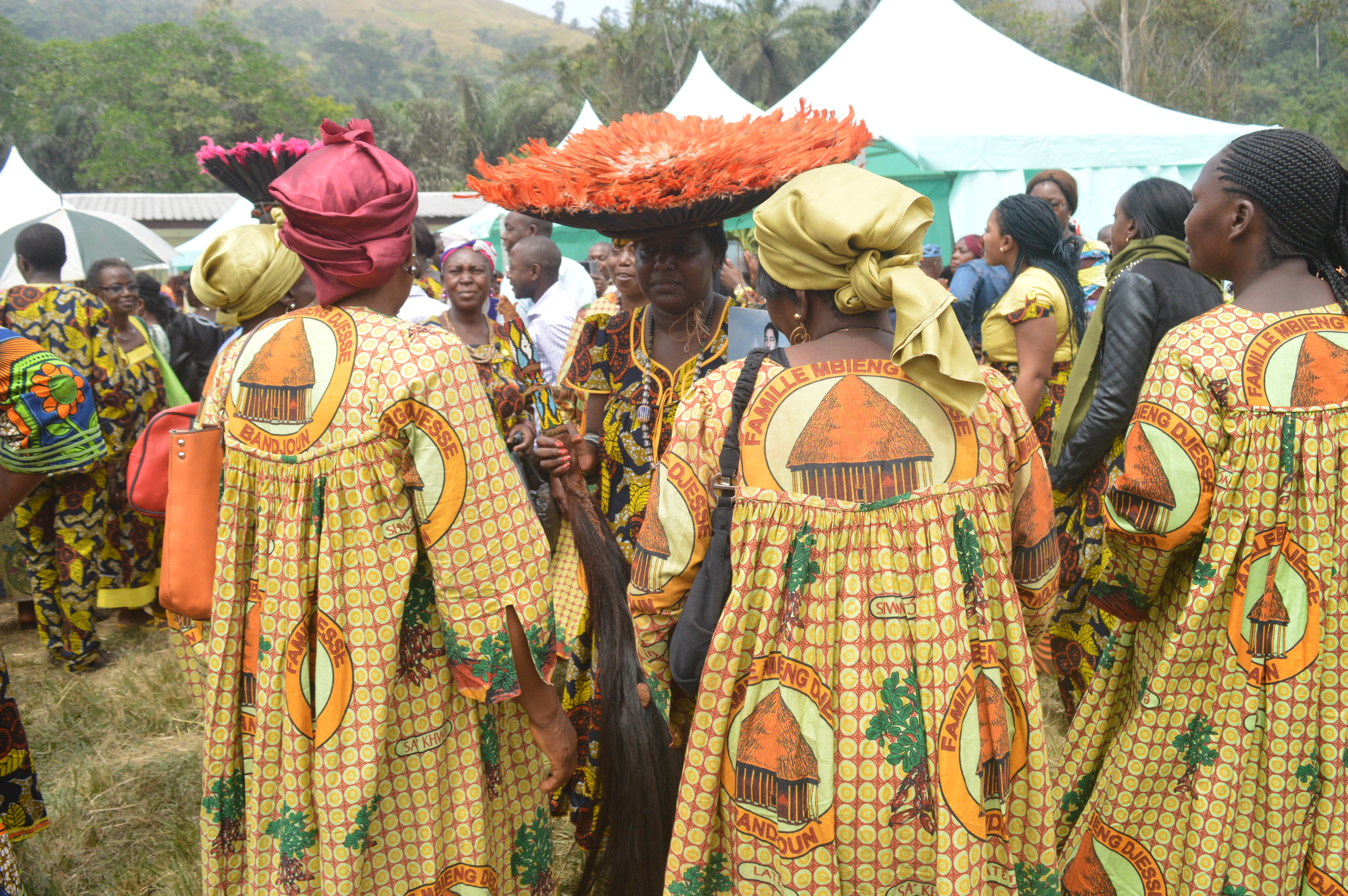

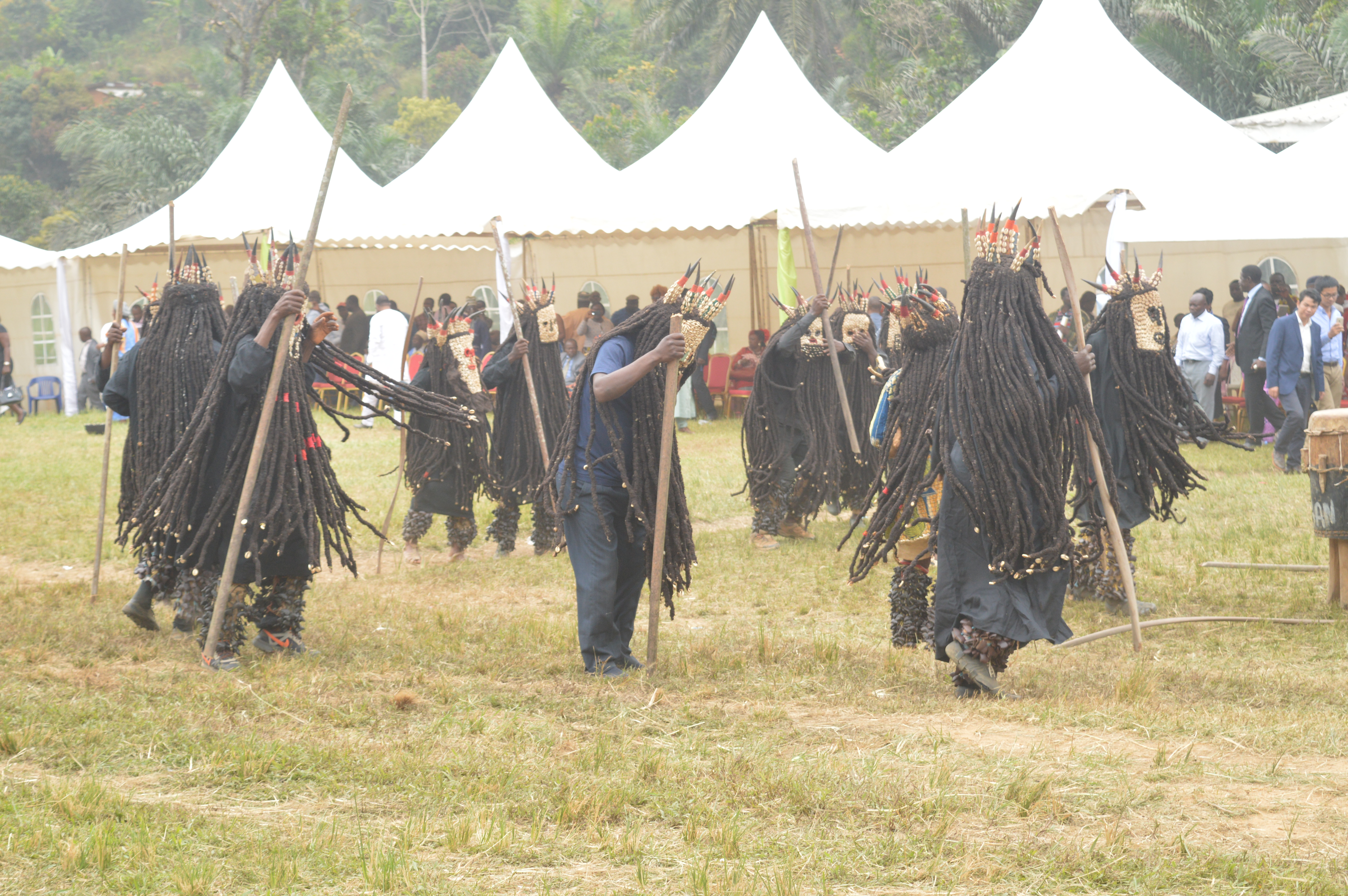

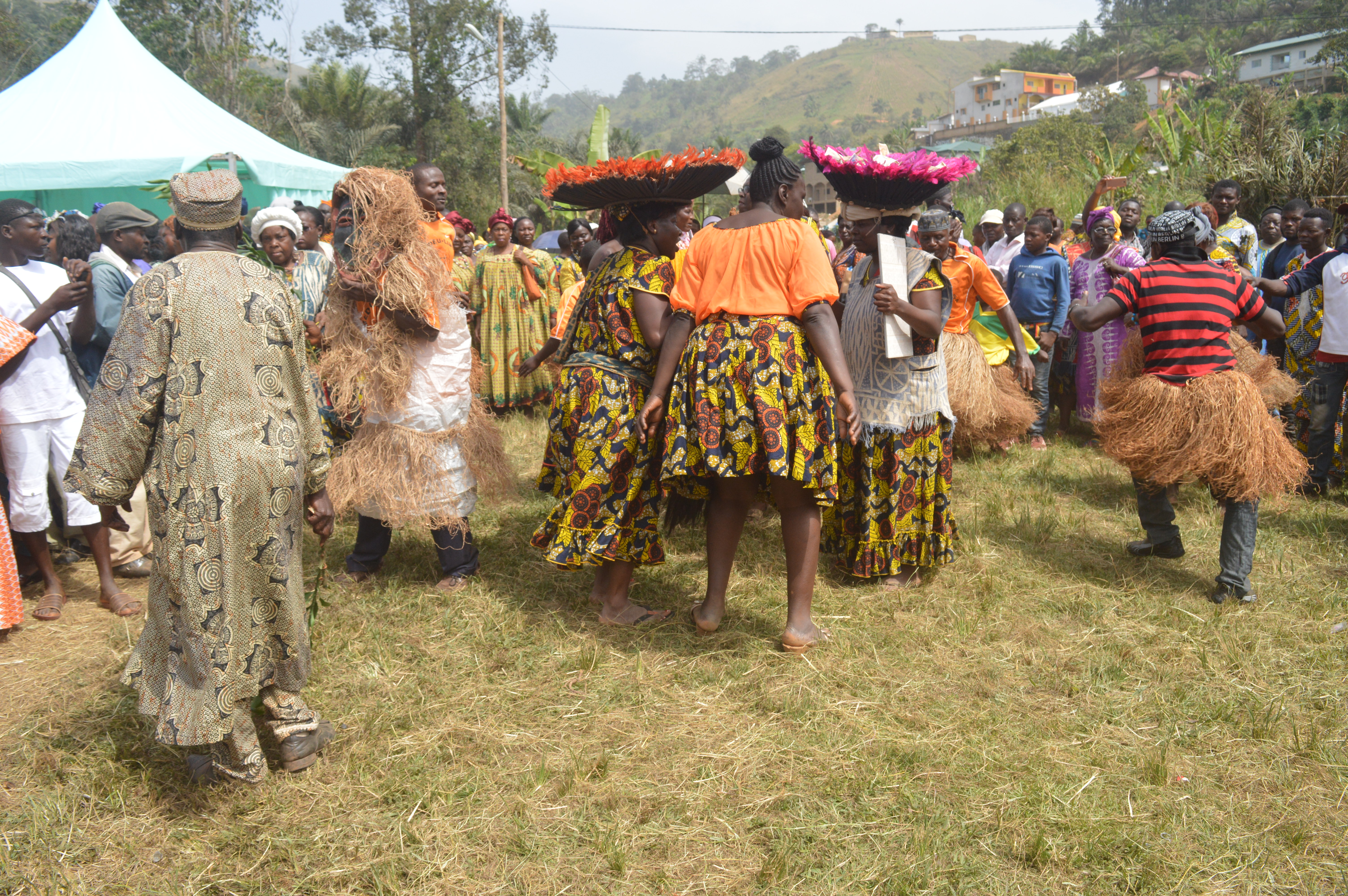

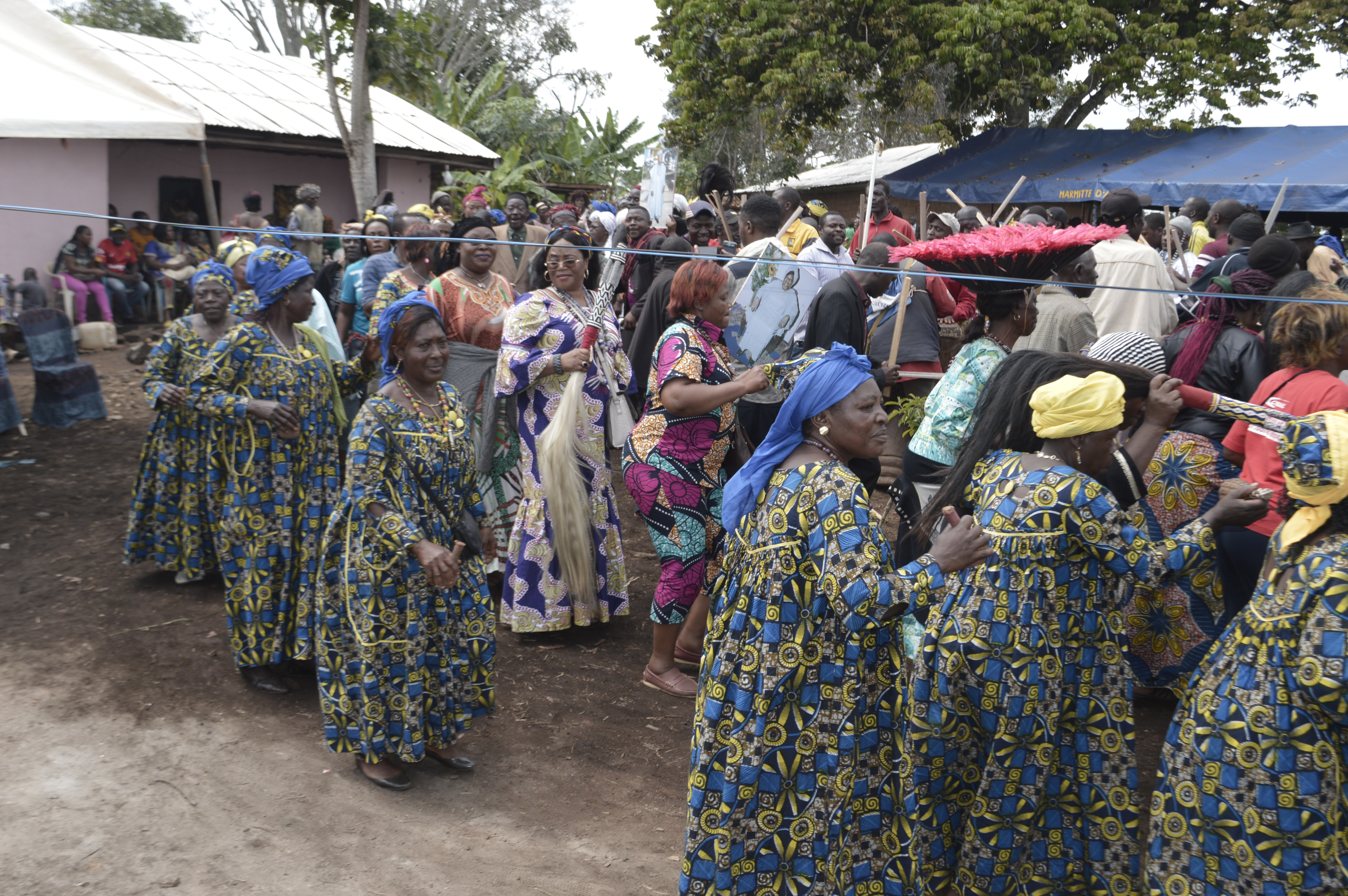

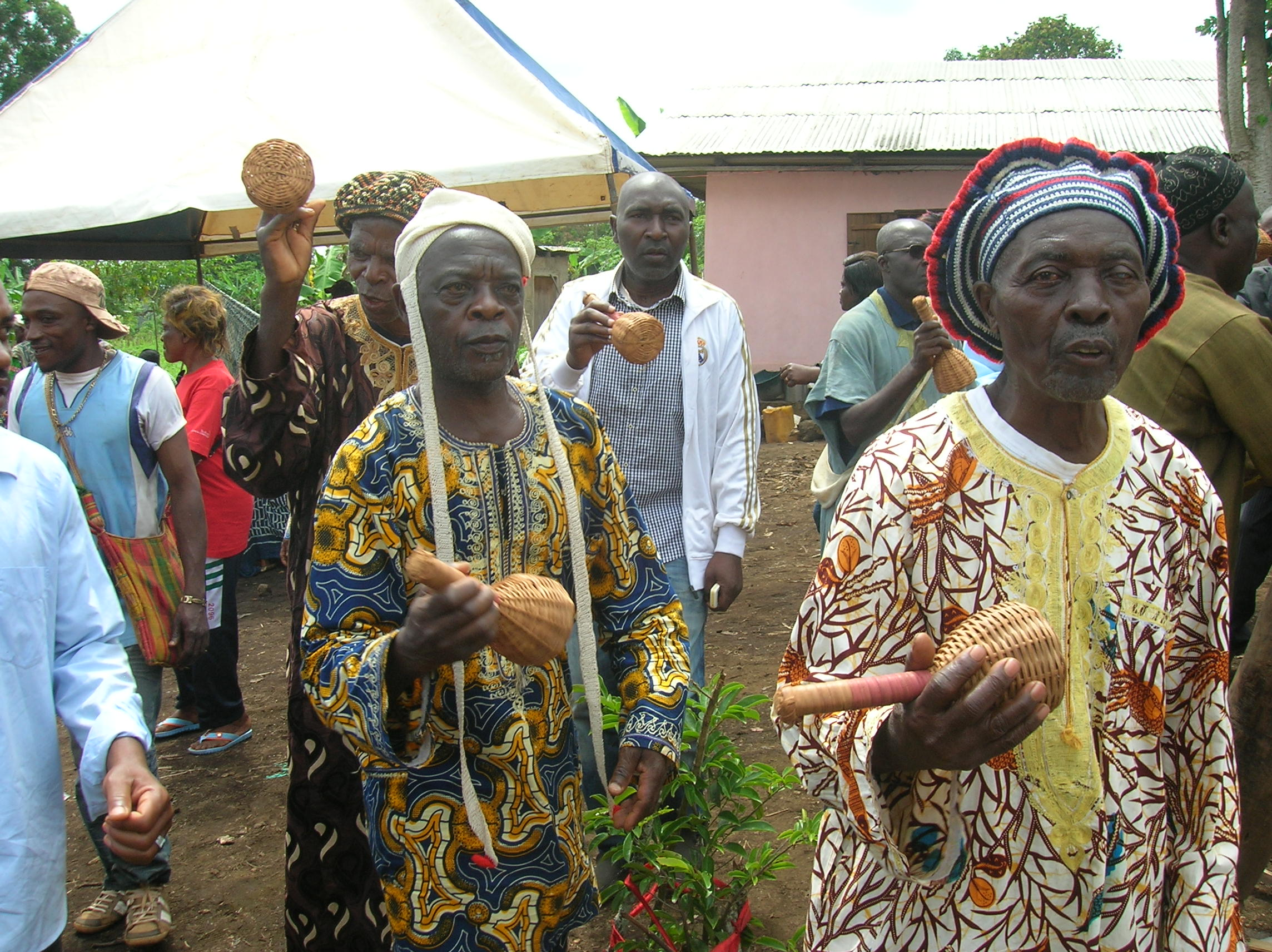

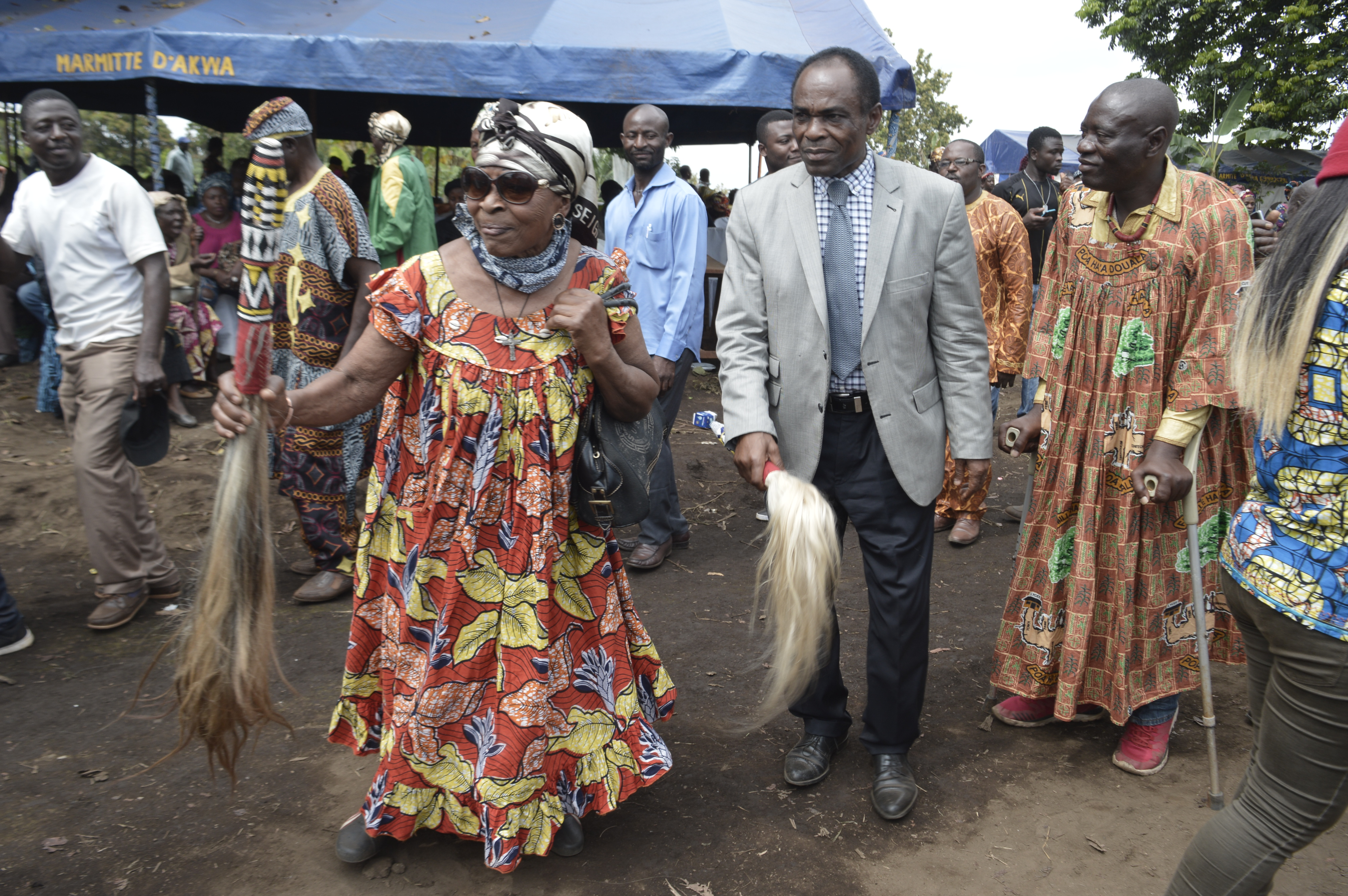

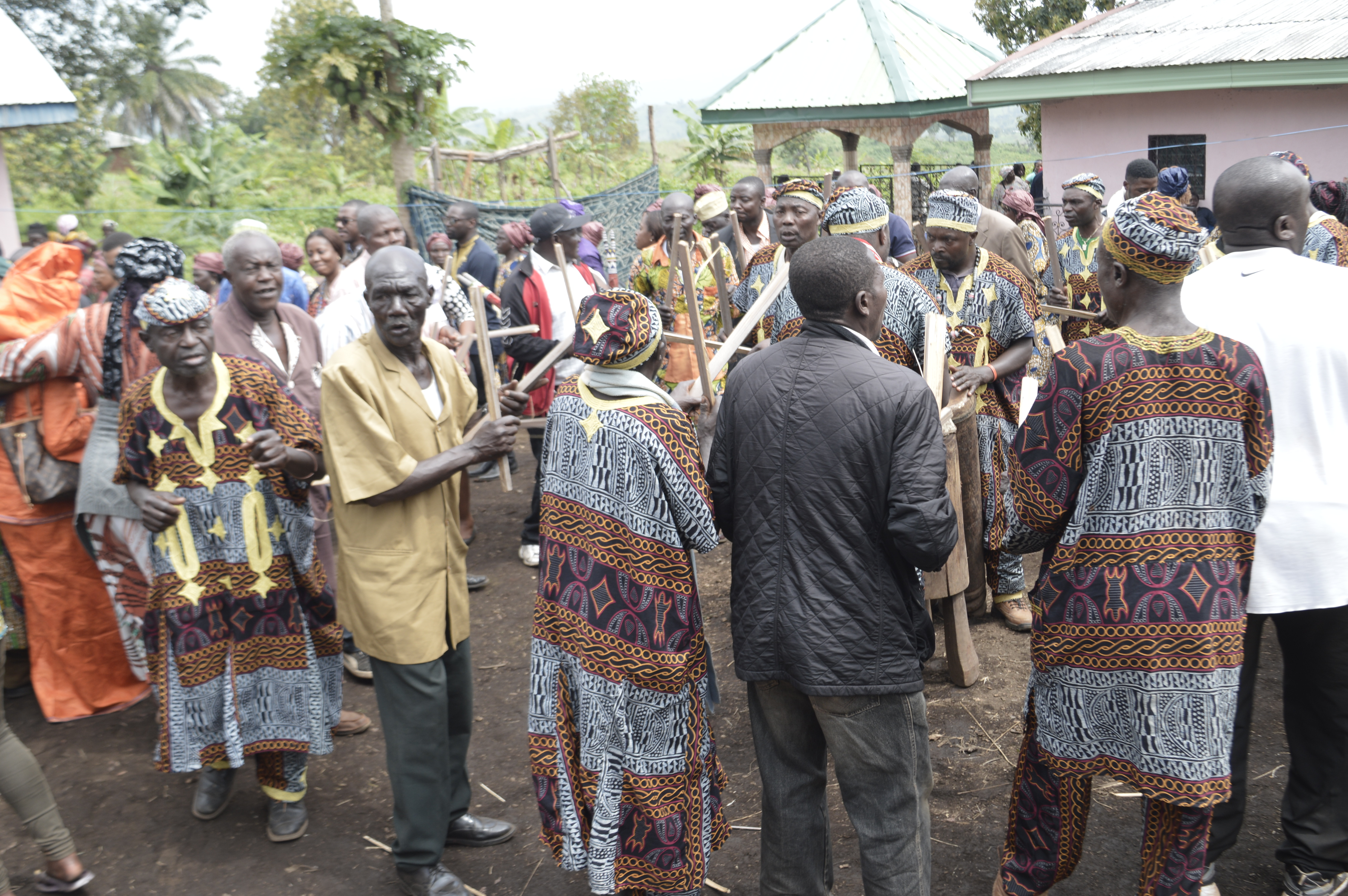

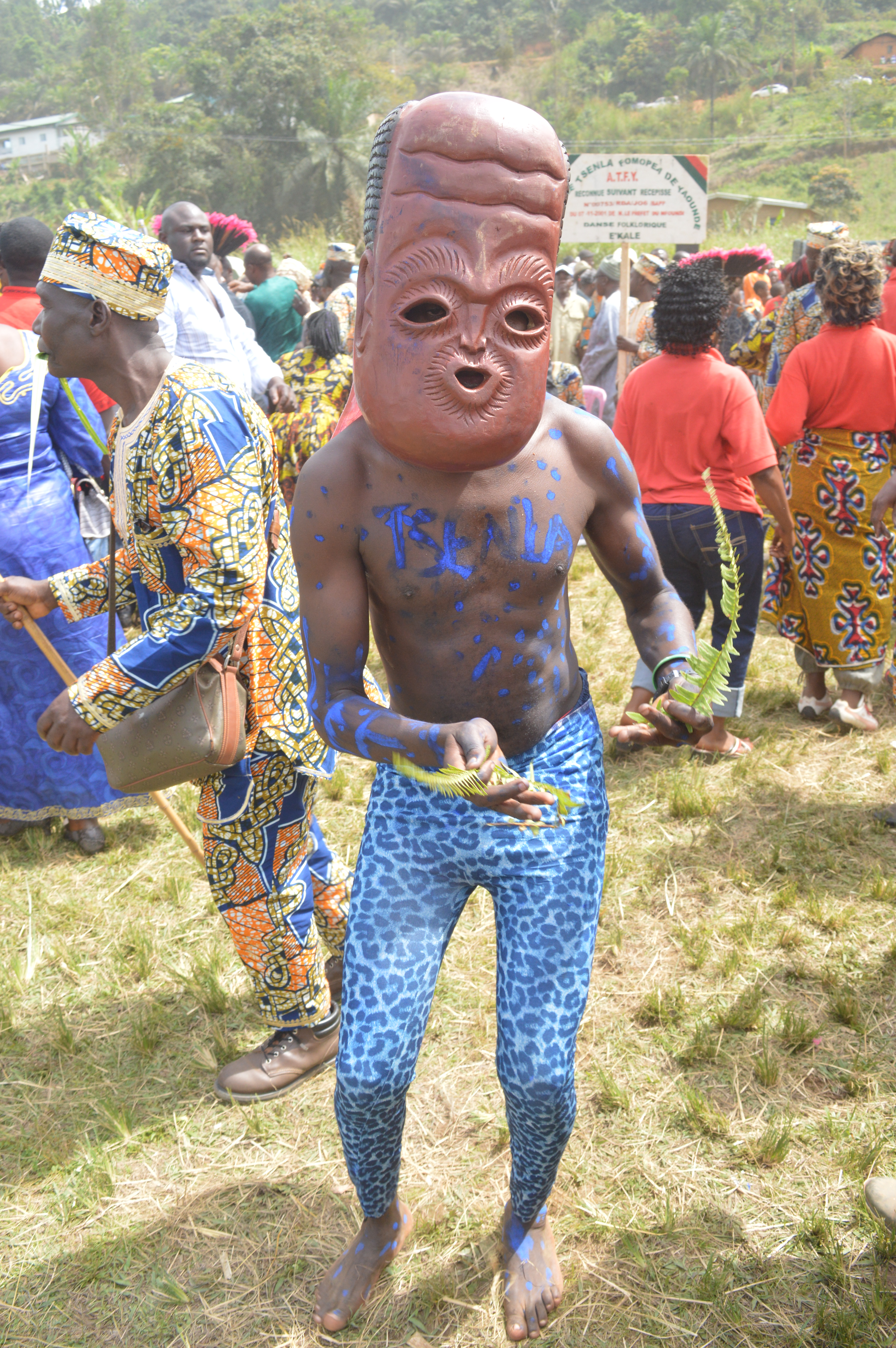

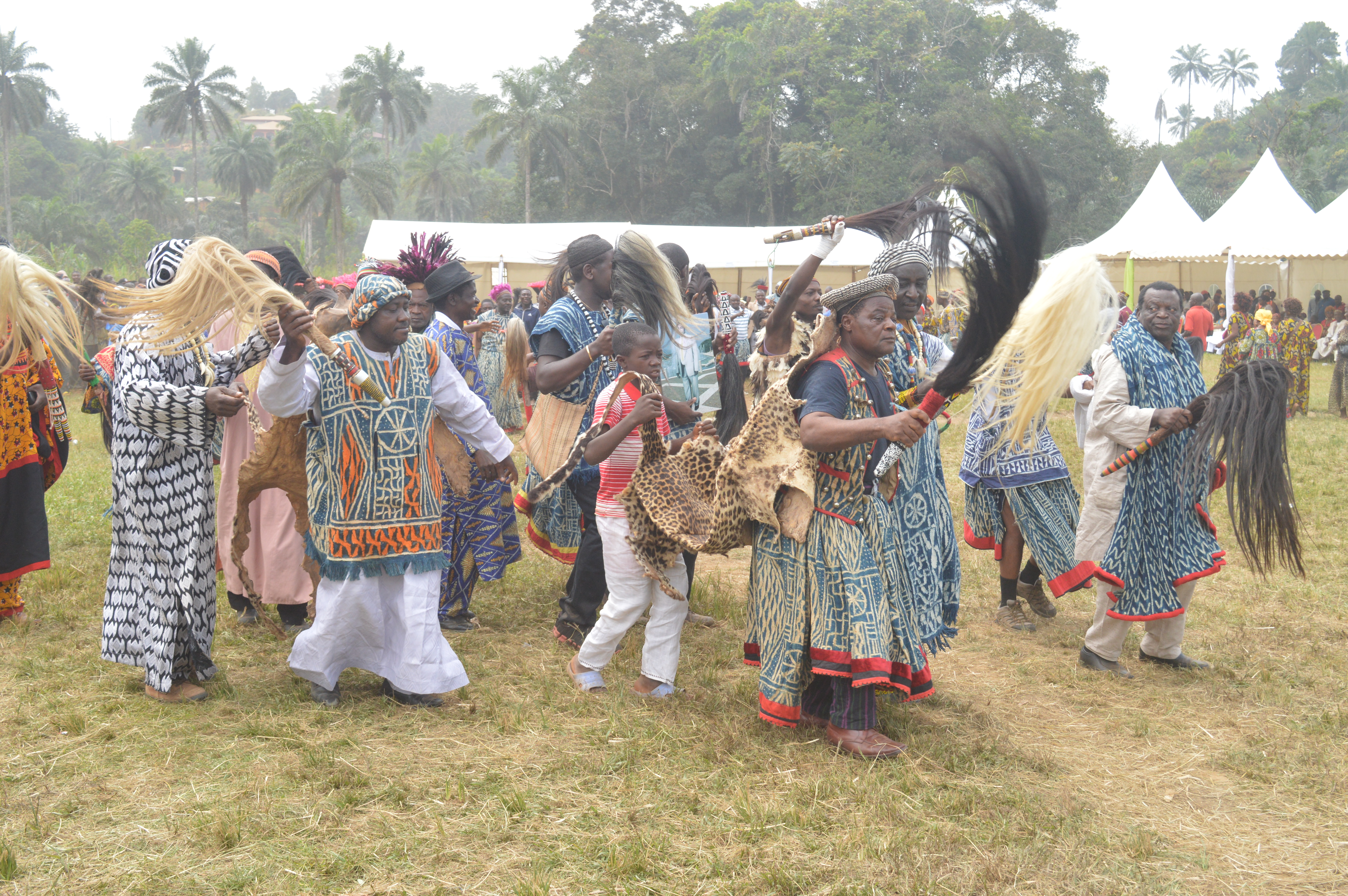

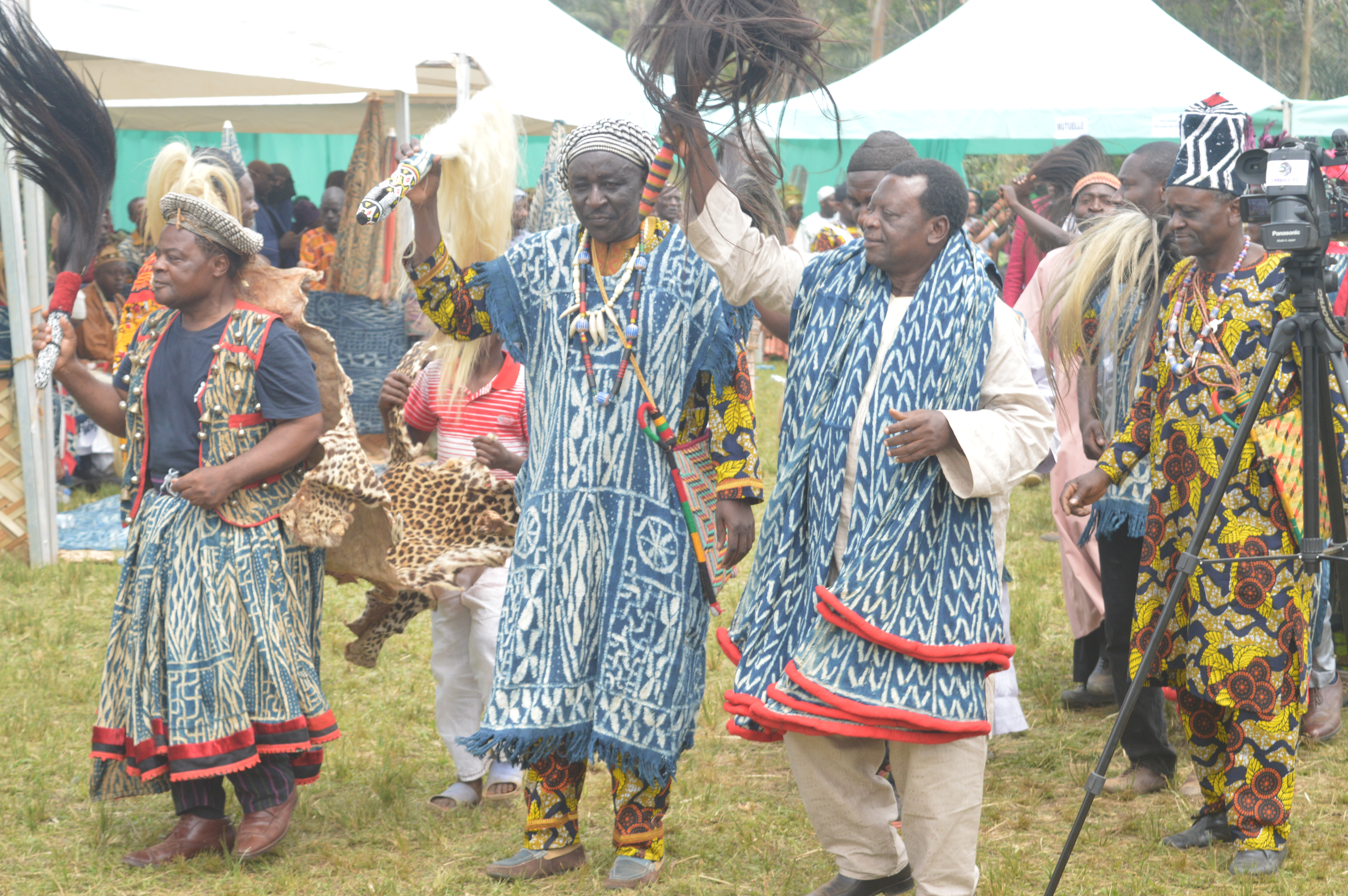

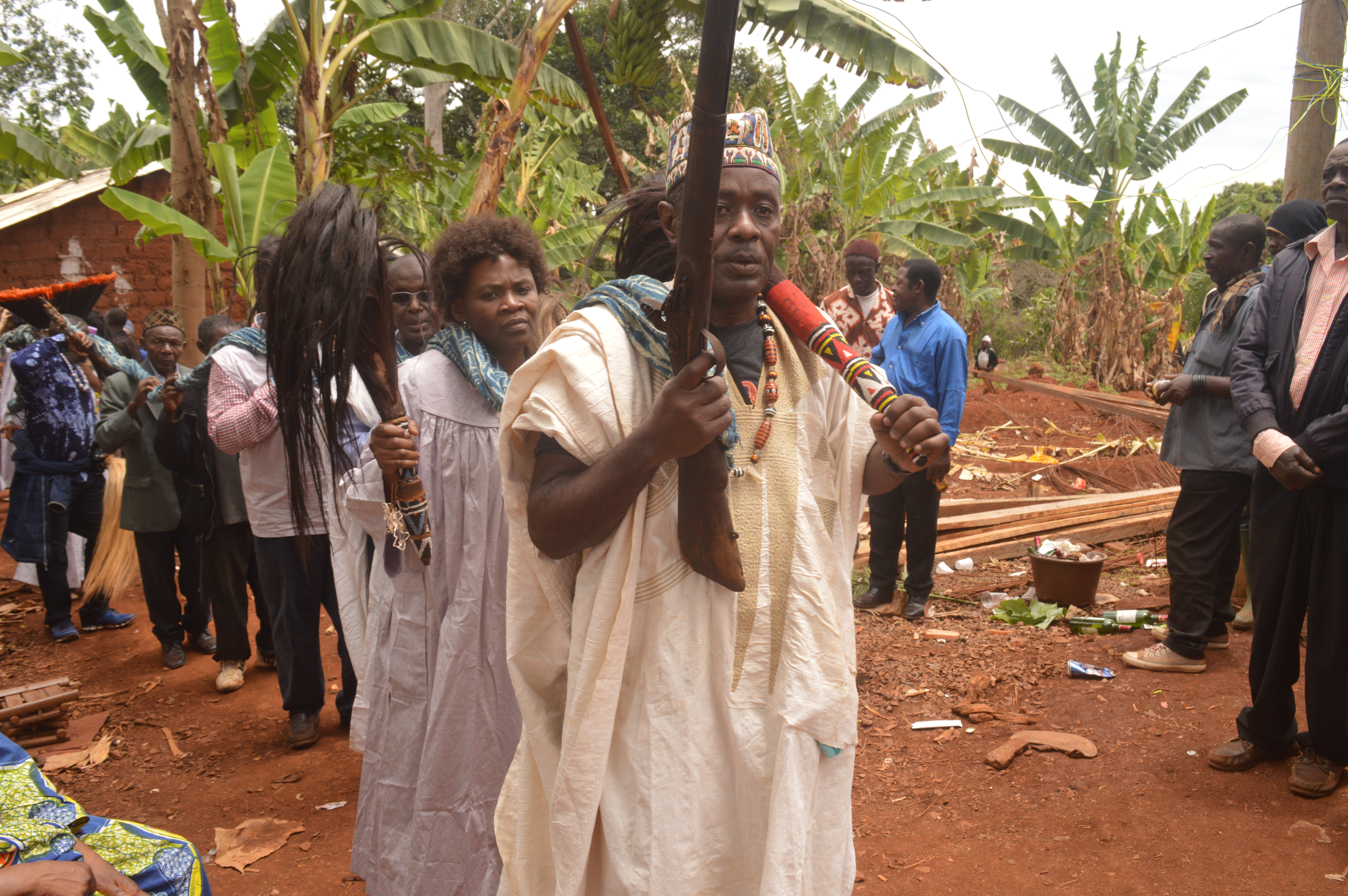

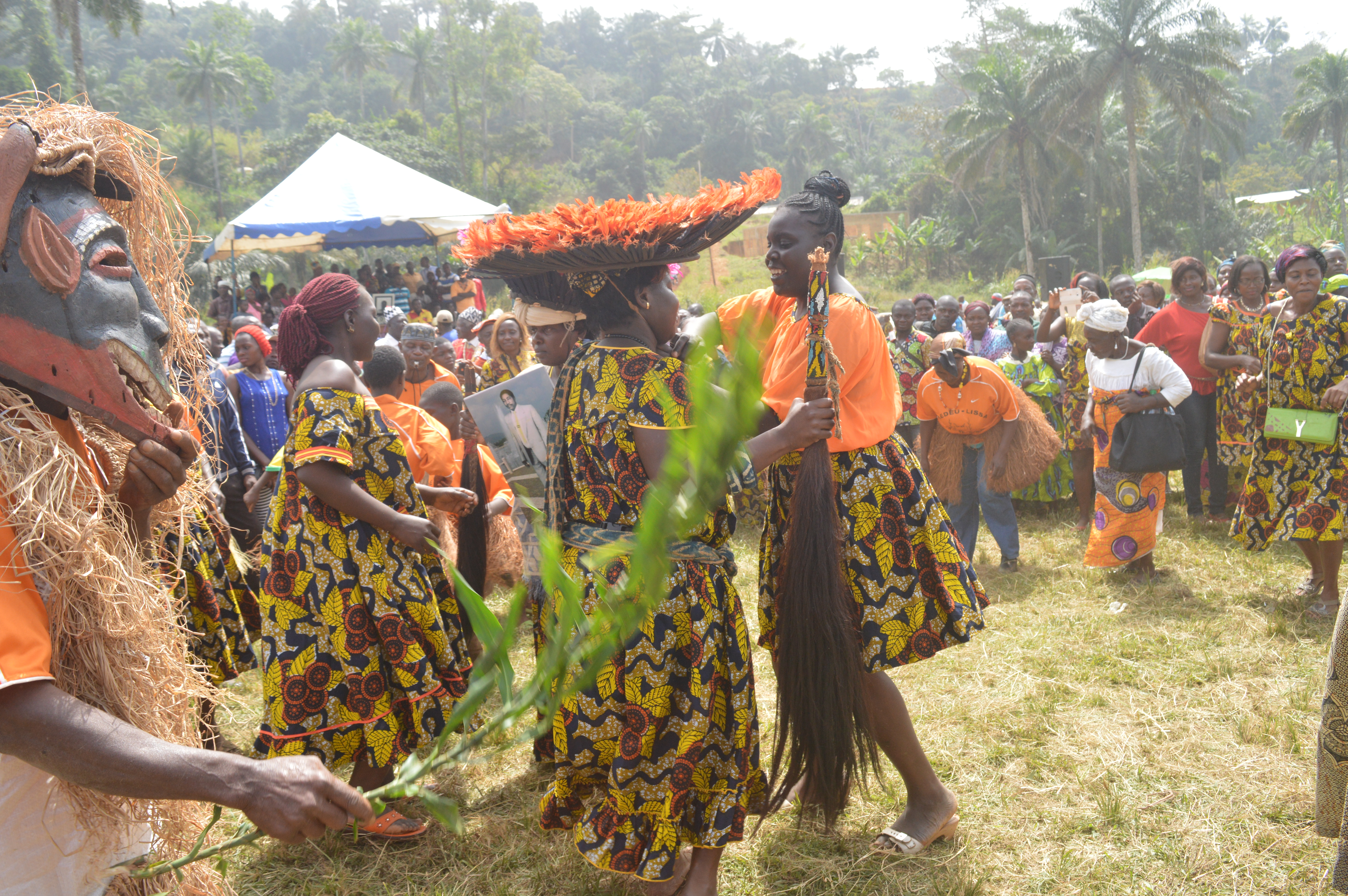

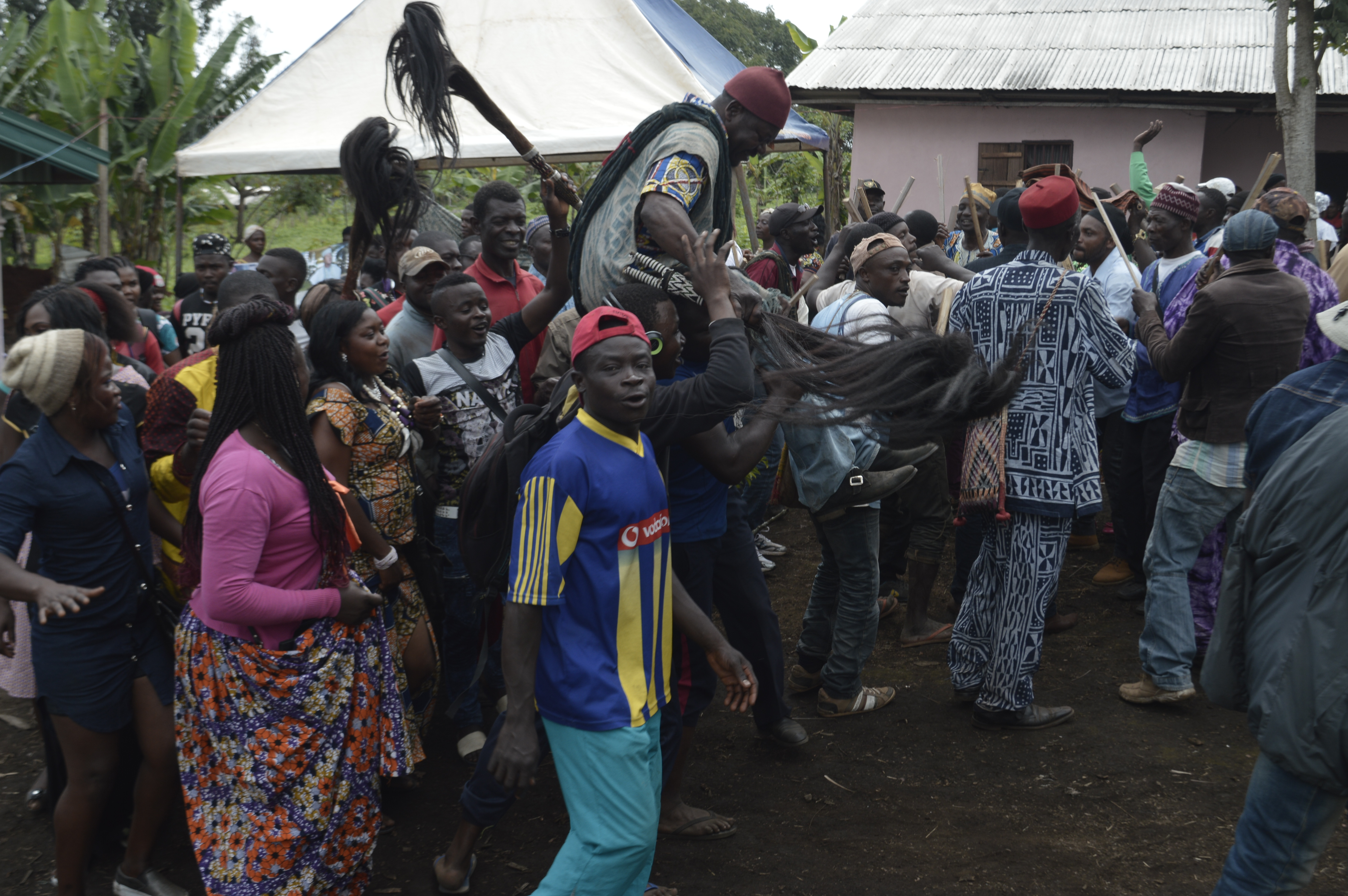

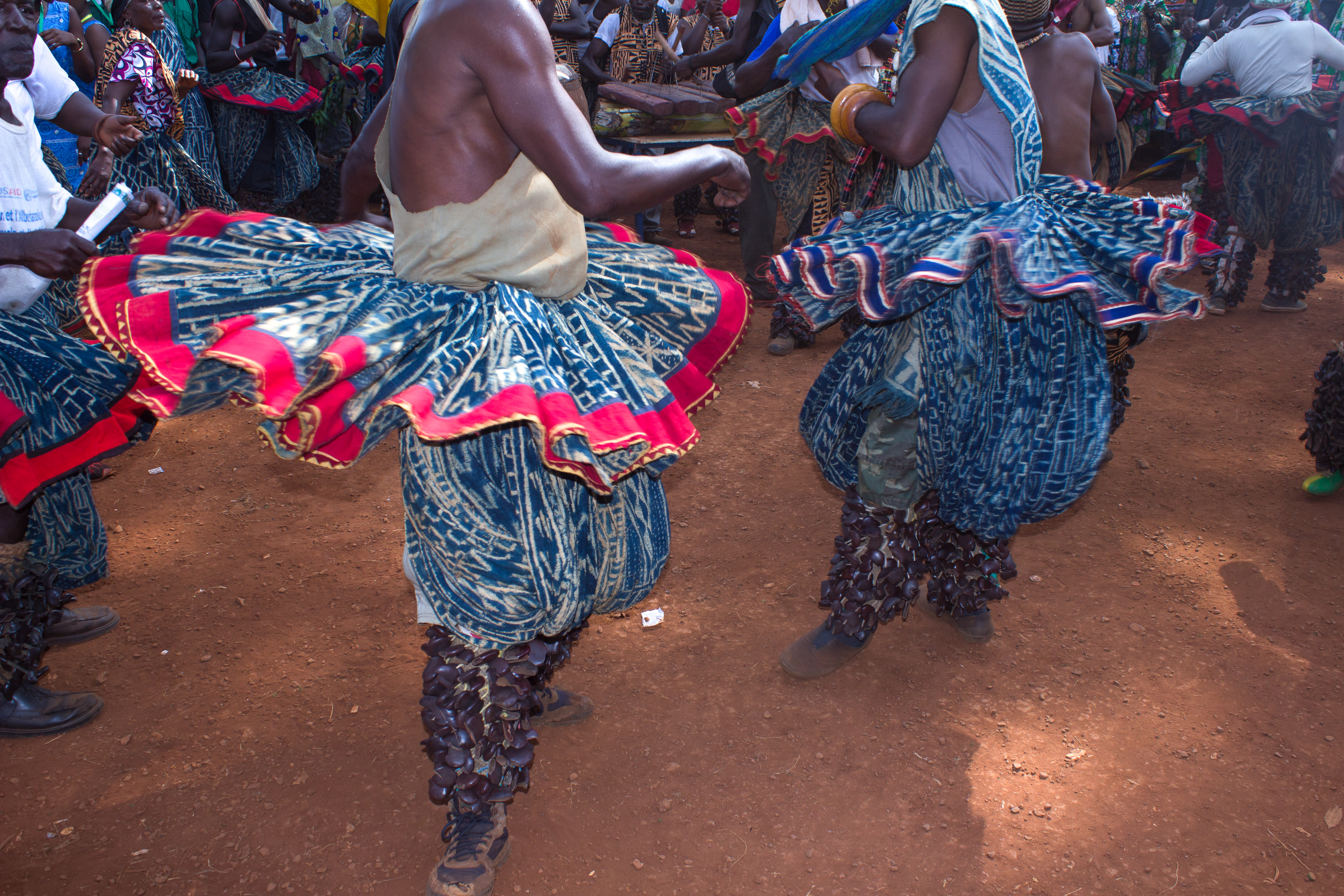
"Clan Age" dance

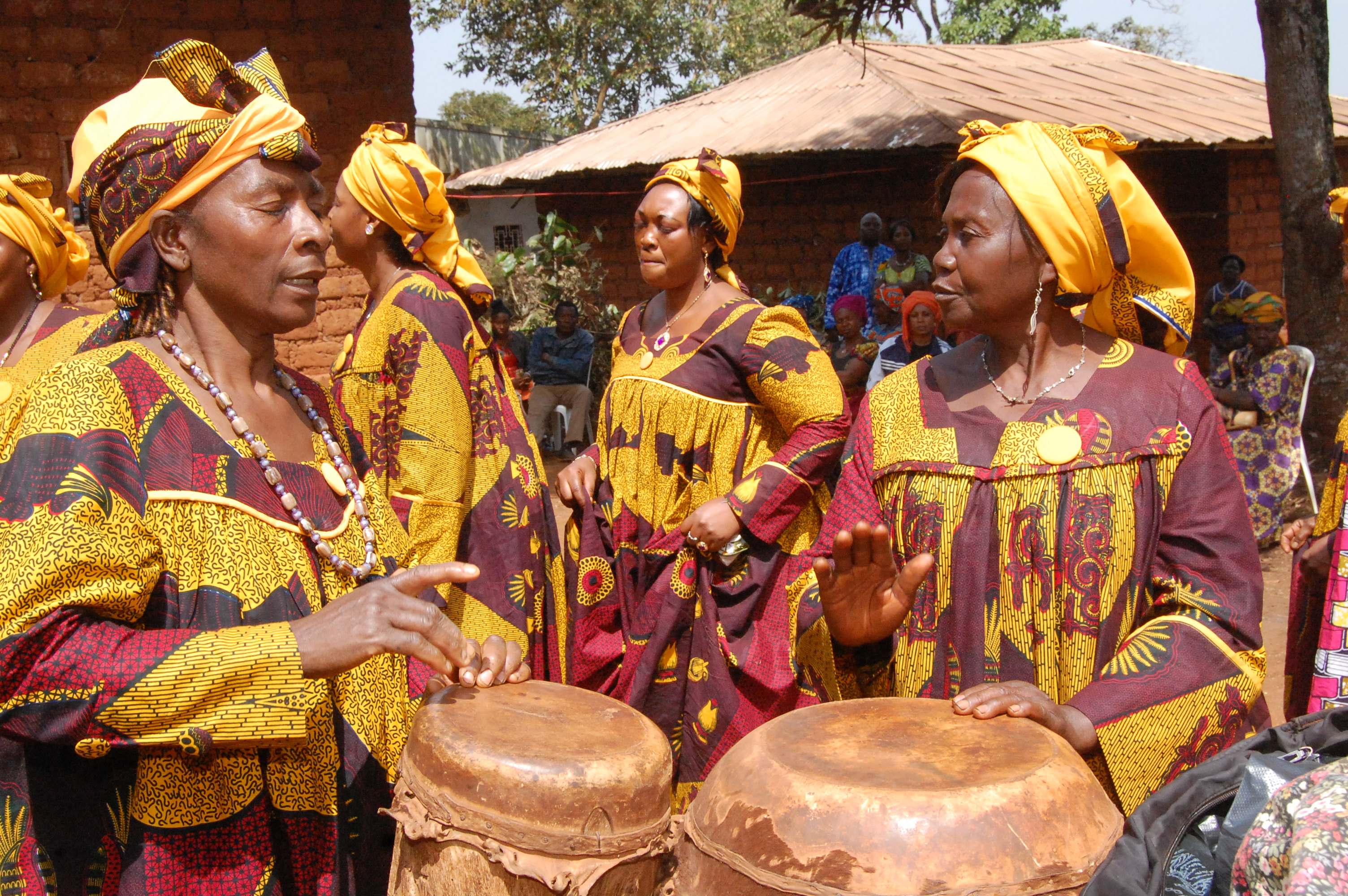

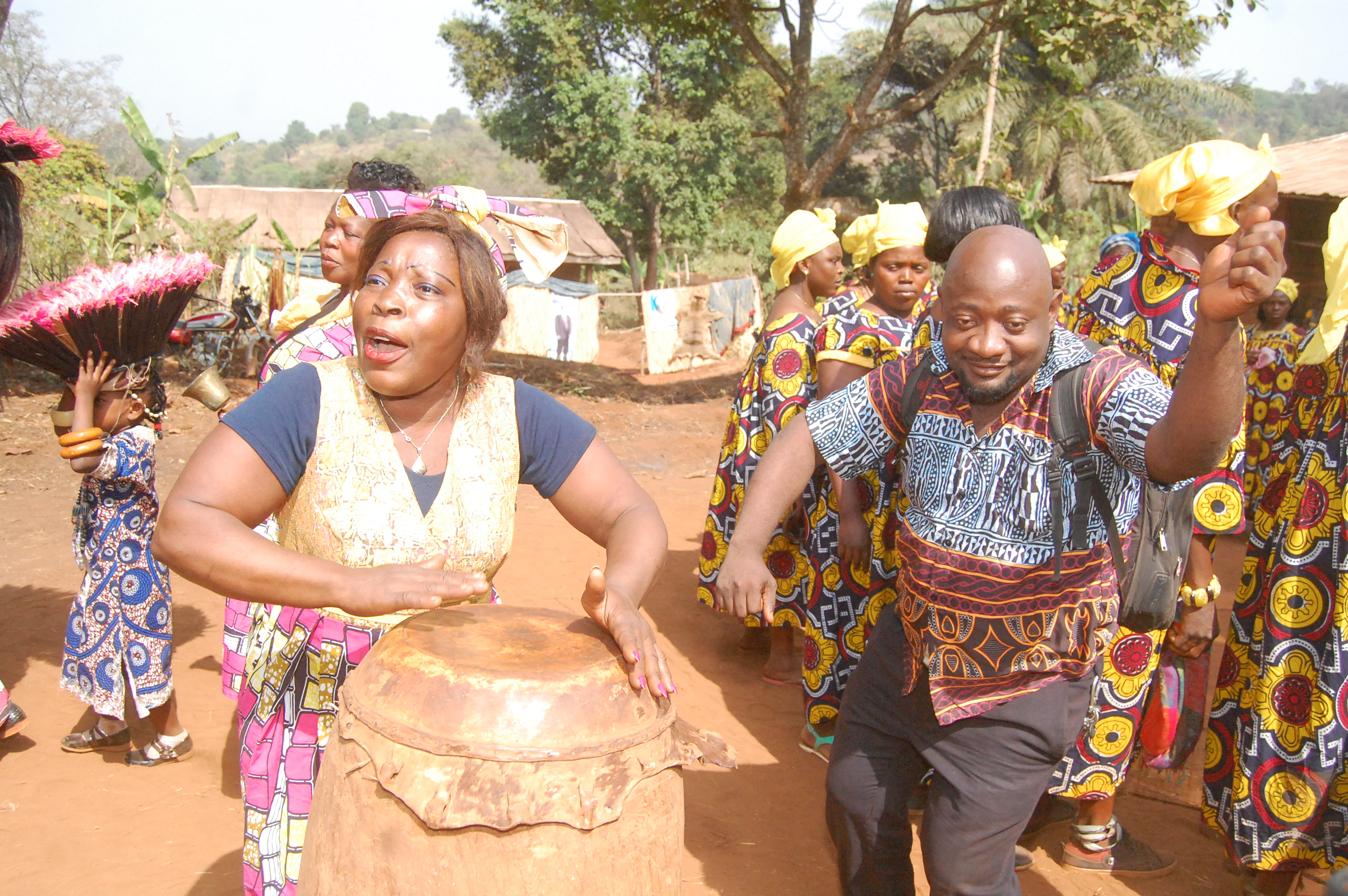

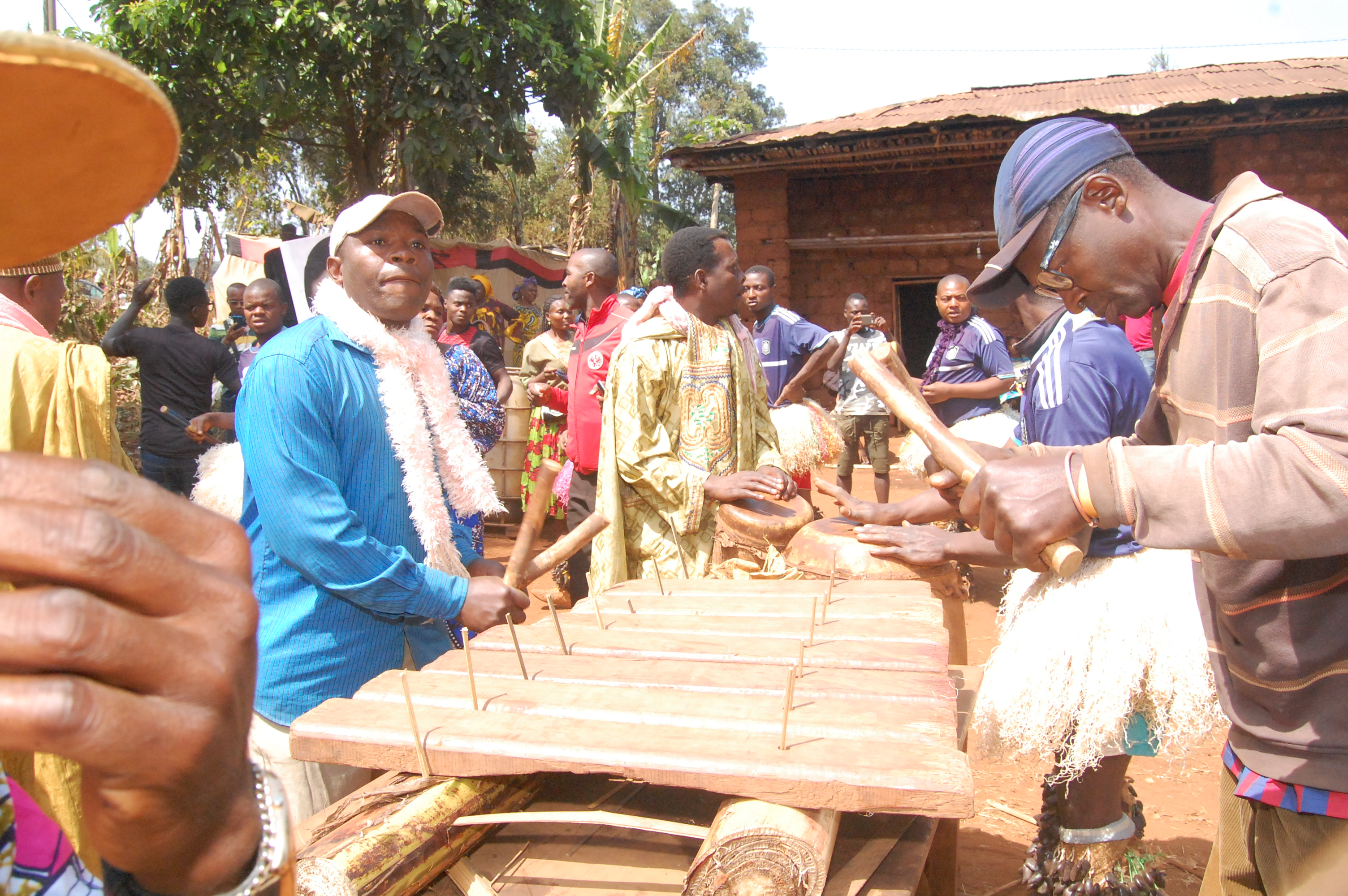

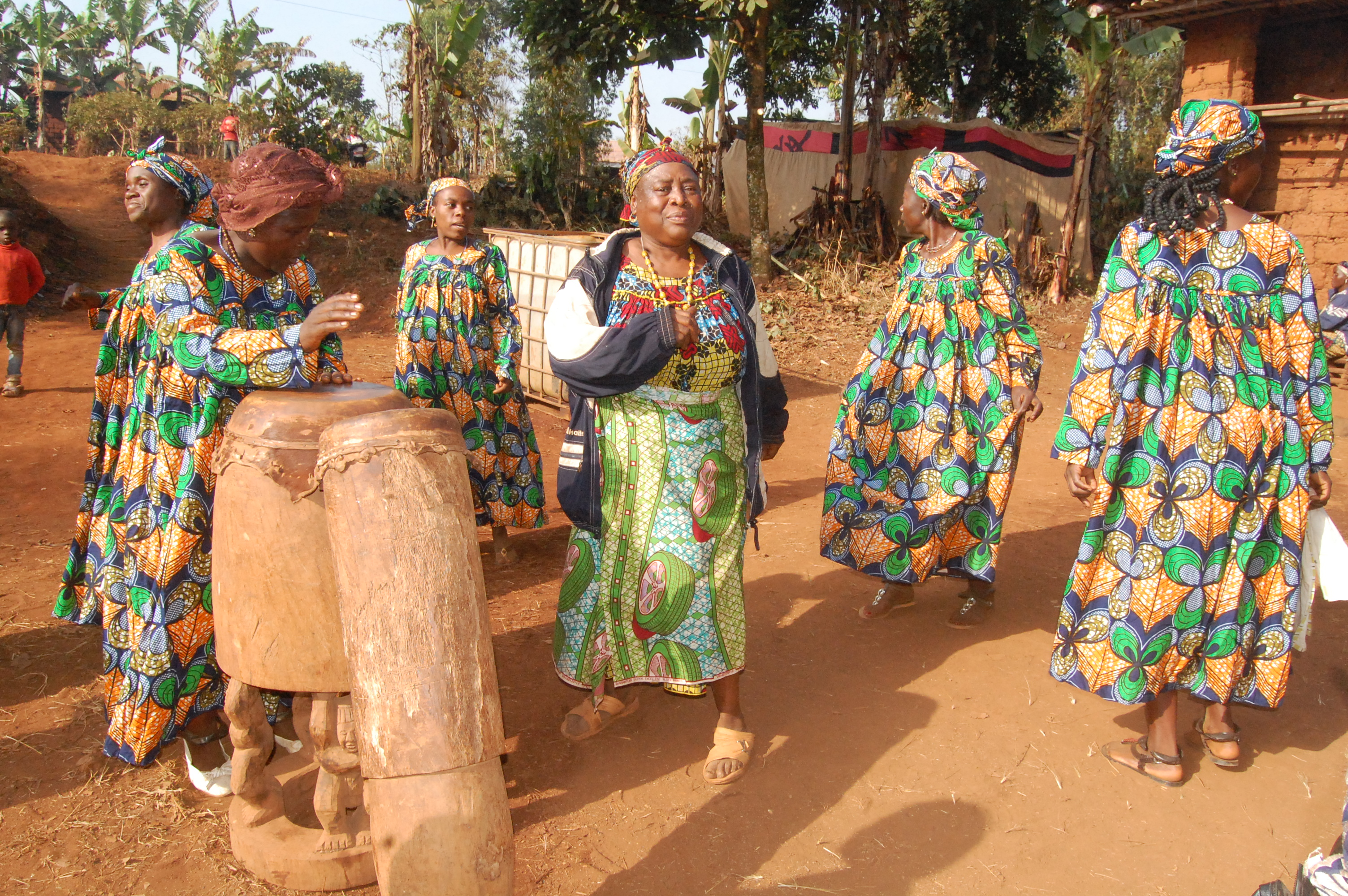

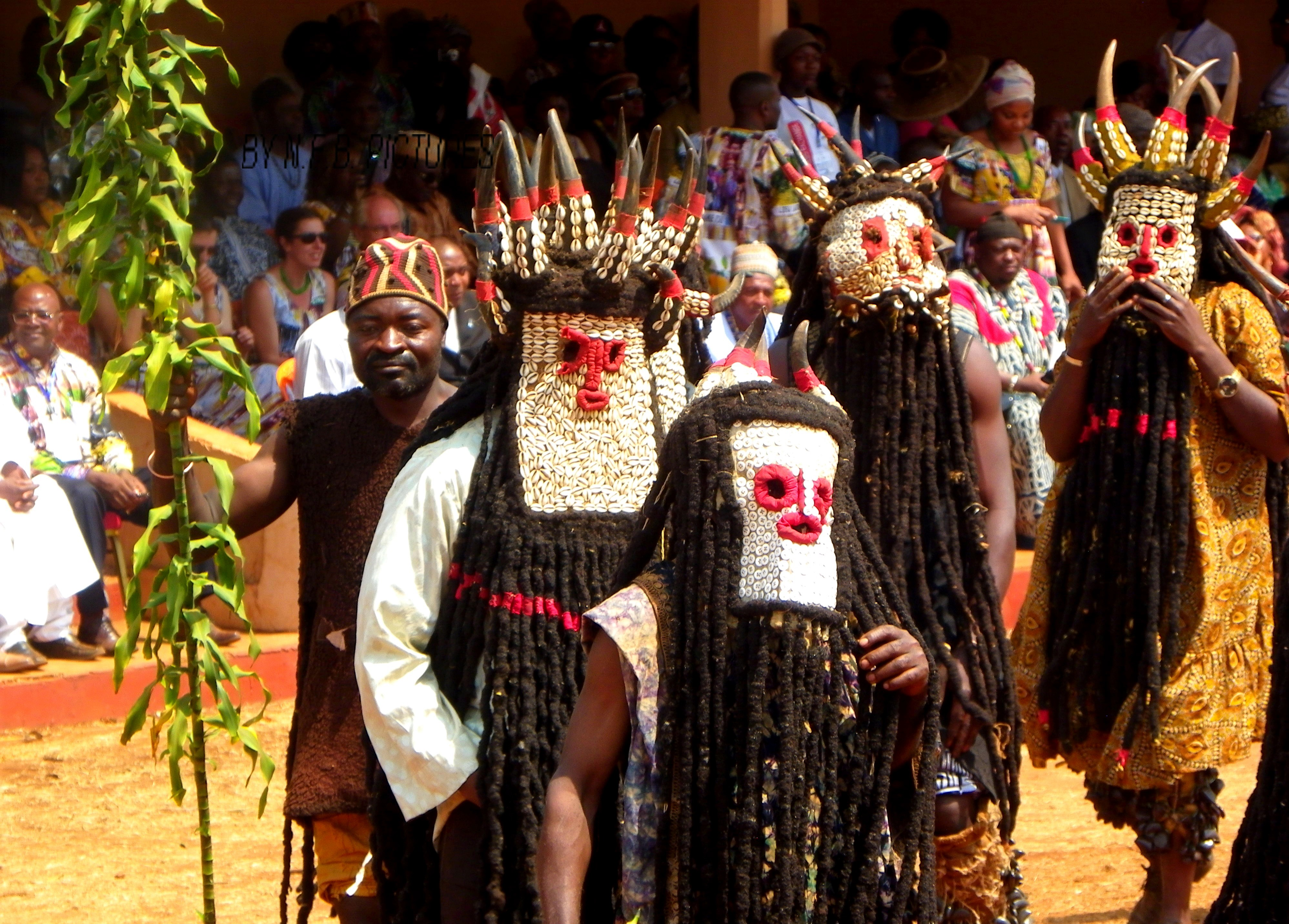

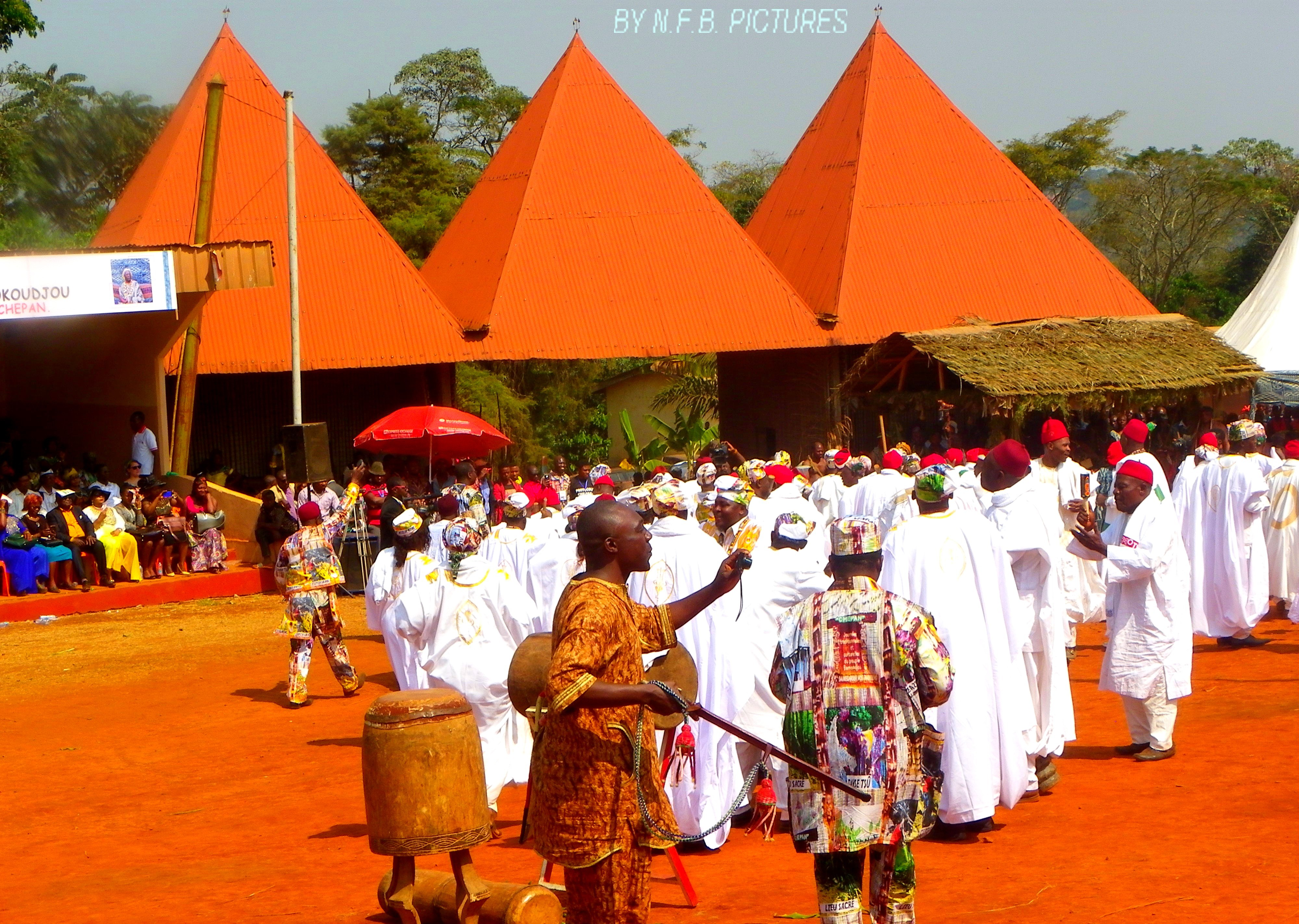

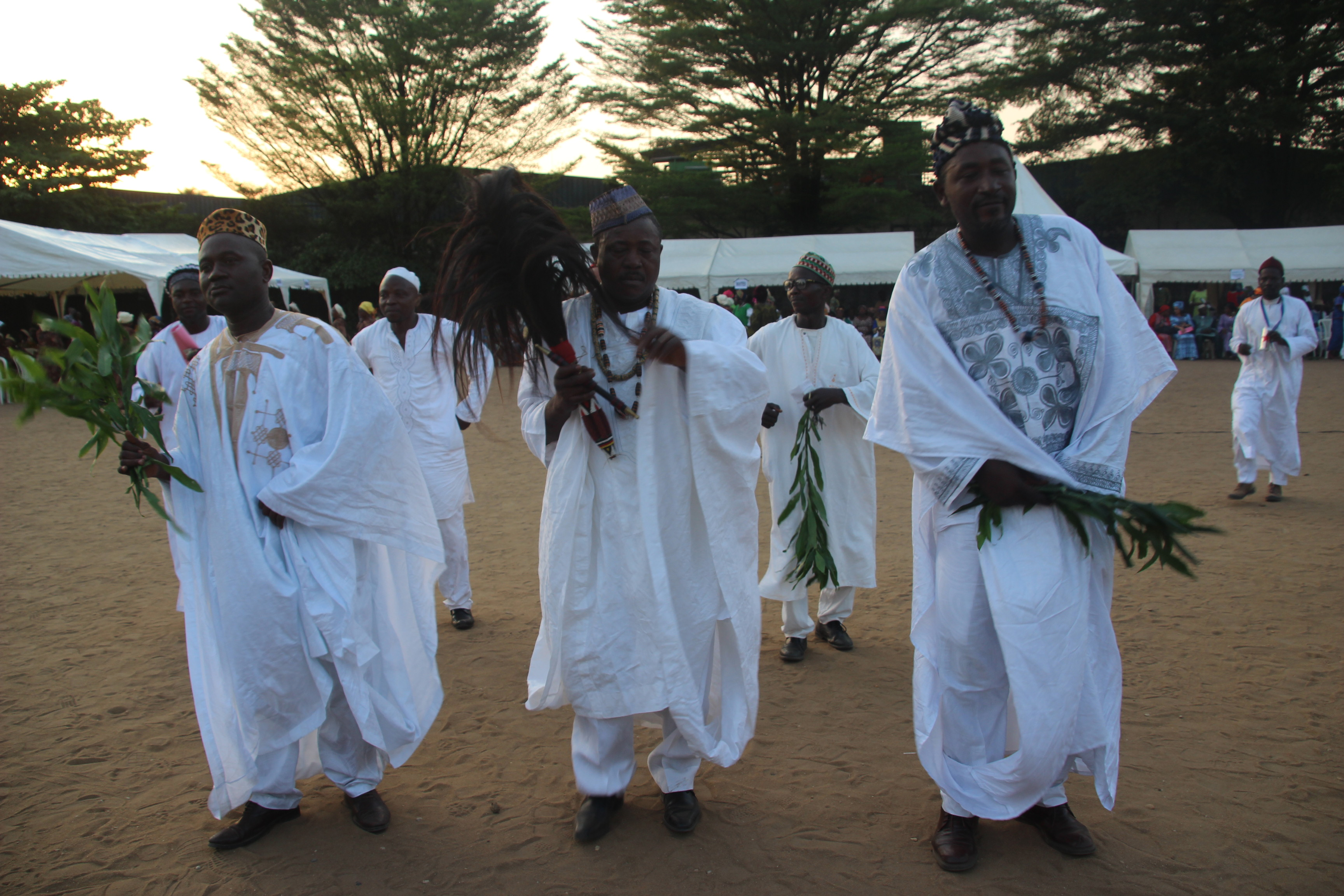
