= Patience Epps =

Linguistics professor

Patience Louise Epps
- Title: Professor
- Awards: Kenneth L. Hale Award

Academic background
- Education: College of William & Mary (BA); University of Virginia (MA, PhD)
- Thesis: A Grammar of Hup (2008)
- Doctoral advisor: Eve Danziger

Academic work
- Discipline: Linguistics
- Sub-discipline: Language documentation, linguistic typology, Amazonian languages, ethnolinguistics, language contact, language change
- School or tradition: Functional-typological linguistics
- Institutions: The University of Texas at Austin
- Website: UT Faculty Page

Patience Louise "Pattie" Epps is an American linguist, serving as a professor and researcher at the University of Texas at Austin. Her main research focus is on the Naduhup language family, which consists of four extant languages in the Amazon.

== Career ==
Epps began her linguistics work with the Hup language of northwest Amazonia while she was working towards her PhD at the University of Virginia. She also does work on language contact in the Vaupés river basin and has continued to do fieldwork in the area, with funding from various grants from the NSF and NEH for the Documenting Endangered Languages funding program. In 2012, her Naduhup studies expanded with a fieldwork grant from the Endangered Language Documentation Program (ELDP) providing funding for her work with Dâw in 2013. She has another ongoing project with Nadëb, with funding from the NEH-DEL lasting from 2019 to 2022.

Her work is notably focused simultaneously on engaging in linguistic inquiry and producing community materials. Epps has regularly collaborated with members of linguistic communities to create documentation of material culture (in the form of, e.g., instructional videos for making items), history (both of the distant past and of recent events as told from elders), family trees, rituals (when given the explicit permission of community members), and pedagogical and reference materials for the language(s) of a given group.

Epps, in collaboration with Claire Bowern, Jane Hill, and Patrick McConvell compiled data to create the Hunter-Gatherer Database, an NSF- and ACLS-funded project with the purpose of collecting "lexical, grammatical, and other data from languages spoken by hunter-gatherer groups and their small-scale agrarian neighbors." The geographical regions of interest for the Hunter-Gatherer Database project were Australia (led by Bowern and McConvell), South America (led by Epps), and California and the Great Basin (led by Hill).

As of 2021, Epps serves on the Awards Subcommittee of the Linguistic Society of America's Committee on Endangered Languages and Their Preservation and serves or has served on the editorial review board for the following publications:

- Mouton Grammar Library, Series editorial team
- Language and Linguistics Compass, Section editor (Historical and Comparative Linguistics)
- Linguistic Typology, Editorial Board
- Anthropological Linguistics, Editorial Board
- Journal of Hunter-Gatherer Research, Editorial Board
- Transactions of the Philological Society, Editorial Board
- Folia Linguistica Historica, Editorial Board
- Journal of Language Evolution, Associate editor
- Amerindia (journal), Scientific committee
- Diachronica (journal), Editorial Advisory Board
- Endangered Languages Publishing's journal, Language Documentation and Description, Editorial Advisory Board
- Archive of the Indigenous Languages of Latin America, Co-director
- Association for Linguistic Typology, Executive Committee (2009–2013)
- Society for the Study of the Indigenous Languages of the Americas, Executive Committee (2009–2013)

== Awards and distinctions ==
In 2007, Epps received the Association for Linguistic Typology's (ALT) Pāṇini Award for her dissertation, A Grammar of Hup.

She received the Kenneth L. Hale Award in 2020, for her work in the Upper Rio Negro region, specifically on Naduhup languages
