= Maku (exonym) =

Pejorative term for Amazonian peoples

Maku (Macu, Máku, Mácu, Makú, Macú) or Maco (Mako, Máko, Macó, Makó) is a pejorative term referring to several hunter-gatherer peoples of the upper Amazon, derived from an Arawakan term ma-aku "do not speak / without speech" (compare the etymologies of the words "Niemcy" and "barbarian"). Nimuendajú (1950), for example, notes six peoples of Colombia, Venezuela, and Brazil that are known as 'Maku'.

== People ==
- Achagua people, Makú-Achagua
- Carabayo people, Macú-Carabayo
- Cofán people
- Dâw people
- Hup people
- Maku-Auari, the Maku of Roraima and the Auari River, Brazil and Venezuela (also known as Mácu/Máko/Maku of Auari; endonym Jukude)
- Nadëb people
- Nïkâk people
- Nukak and Kakwa, Macu de Cubeo, Macu de Desano, Macu de Guanano, Macú-Paraná)
- Piaroa, Maco-Ventuari
- Puinave people
- Piaroa, Maku-Ventuari
- Wirö, Maku-Wirö, Venezuela and Colombia
- Yanomami, Macú-Yanomami

== Languages ==
- Nadahup languages, a small language family in Brazil, Colombia, and Venezuela, sometimes disambiguated from other Maku languages as Makú or Macú, though those forms can apply to any of the languages, or as Makuan. Such languages include Hup, spoken by Hupda (Hupdá Makú, Makú-Hupdá, Macú De) and Guariba Maku
- closely related Nukak and Kakwa (Macu de Cubeo, Macu de Desano, Macu de Guanano, Macú-Paraná)
- Maku-Auari language, the 'Maku' of Roraima and the Auari River, a possible language isolate of Brazil and Venezuela (also known as Mácu, Máko or Maku of Auari; endonym Jukude)
- Wirö dialect of Piaroa (sometimes disambiguated as Mako or Maco) a.k.a. Maco-Hoti, spoken by the Marueta people of Venezuela

It has also been used for various other languages and peoples in the area, such as:

- Achagua language, Makú-Achagua.
- Arutani and Sape languages.
- Carabayo language, Macú-Carabayo.
- Cofán language a.k.a. Mako, Cofán-Makú.
- Maco-Cuyabeno was an unattested language that may have been a dialect of the Cofán language (Pérez 1862:475), and was spoken on the Cuyabeno River near the headwaters of the Aguarico River in southeastern Colombia.
- Piaroa language a.k.a. Maco-Ventuari. Maco-Ventuari (Wirö) is a language variety spoken on the Ventuari River in Venezuela that is closely related to the Piaroa language spoken today. It was documented in a 38-word list by Humboldt (1822:155-157).
- Puinave language along the Negro and Japurá Rivers a.k.a. Mácu, Macú, Makú
- Yanomaman languages, Macú-Yanomami.

== See also ==
- Puinave–Maku languages, a proposed family of Nadahup and various other languages called Maku
- Dorobo, a pejorative term for hunter-gatherers living among the Masai
- San people, a pejorative term for hunter-gatherers living among the Khoekhoe
