= Hupda =

Hupda, Hupde, Jupda, and variants, may refer to:

- Hupda people, an ethnic group of the Amazon
- Hupda language, their language
