= Dâw =

Dâw or Kamã may refer to:

- Dâw people, an indigenous people of the Amazon
- Dâw language, the language spoken by the Dâw people
