= MGL =

MGL may refer to:

- the International Olympic Committee code for Mongolia, see Mongolia at the Olympics
- Missionaries of God's Love, a Roman Catholic religious congregation
- IATA airport code for Mönchengladbach Airport
- ICAO code for MIAT Mongolian Airlines
- General Laws of Massachusetts, also known as Massachusetts General Laws
- Monoacylglycerol lipase, a human protein
- Mouton Grammar Library, a linguistic book series
- Multiple grenade launcher, such as the Milkor MGL
- Multiple granularity locking, a method for locking in databases
