= Hupda people =

Amazonian Indigenous people who live in Brazil and Colombia

Hupda
Hupd'äh
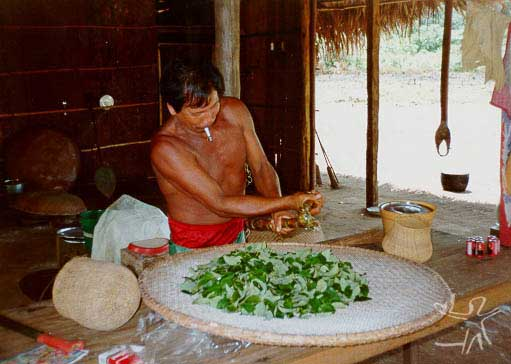
- A Hupda person preparing ipadu

Total population
- 1,500 (estimated)

Regions with significant populations
- Brazil, Colombia

Languages
- Hup language, Colombian Spanish, Brazilian Portuguese

Religion
- Shamanism

Related ethnic groups
- Tukanoan, Desana, Tuyuka, Tariano

The Hupda (also known as Hup, Hupd'äh, or Húpd’əh) are an Amazonian Indigenous people who live in Brazil and Colombia. They speak the Hup language.

== Residence and neighbors ==
The Hupd'äh people live in the region bordered by the rivers Tiquié and Papuri, tributaries that join the left hand bank of the river Vaupés in the Upper Rio Negro region of the state of Amazonas in Brazil and the Department of Vaupés in Colombia. They are known as part of the Naduhup language family, and have been in contact with the frontiers of colonization since the 18th century. There are records of countless epidemics of measles, smallpox, and influenza, which decimated the population. Currently they are distributed in approximately 35 villages (local groups) estimated at a total of 1500 individuals. The Hupda villages are, in general, close to areas of Tukanoan, Tariana, Tuyuka and Piratapuyo population, populations which speak languages of the Tukanoan language family, living near the banks of the streams and rivers that make up the hydrographic basin of the Vaupés river.

There are other tribes who are part of the Hupd'äh language family in the (Rio) Negro (black) river region. Each tribe has its own language and practically lives in the jungle, on the small streams. Some Yuhup people, for example, live on the streams on the right hand margin of the Tiquié river (Castaño, Samaúma, Cunuri and Ira streams), are fewer in number than the Hupda and barely have contact with them. The Kakua people live on the streams on the left hand side of the Papuri River, in Colombia, and maintain sporadic contact with the Hupda who live on the streams flowing into the Papuri River. Still in Colombia, are the Nukak people on the Guaviri and Enírida rivers. The Dâw people, commonly known as the Kama, are the smallest tribe and are currently about 100 in number; they live around São Gabriel da Cachoeira although their traditional home is on the streams flowing into the Curicuriari River. Finally the Nadëb, in permanent contact with the merchants (regatões), live by extracting natural jungle products on the Jurubaxi and Uneuixi rivers that flow into the right hand side of the Rio Negro river.

The word Makú is not Hup. It probably comes from the Arawak (Baniwa) and means "he who does not have language" or "he who does not have our language". (ma-aku; ma=personal pronoun, aku=language). J. Hill (1986) uses the name "Wakuénai" to designate the five northern dialects of Arawak and translates "Wakuénai" as "people who speak our language" (wa-aku-nai; wa=ours, aku=language, nai=associative suffix). J. Hill differentiates the Kuripaco and Baniwa of Içana from the Maakunai {ma-ku-nai ma=personal pronoun aku=language nai=associative suffix =those who have no language} to designate other groups whose language the Hupda don't understand. In this case, for Baniwa, the Tukanos would also be Maakunai. Judging based on this linguistic aspect, it is possible to confirm the hypothesis of Nimuendajú that the various groups known as the Makú were in the region, living on the banks of the river, before the arrival of the Arawakan, from the North by way of the Cassiquiari channel, and the Tukanos, from the West. In reality, the term Makú is used inaccurately in the whole Rio Negro region, not only among the indigenous peoples but also among the caboclos ( those of mixed European and native origin) and it is being incorporated into the dialects of the inhabitants of São Gabriel. The semantic context of the term has always been associated with forest as opposed to the horticultural Indians like the Tukanoan and the Arawakan. By reason of the geographical location of their villages, the Tukanoan have always been described as Indians-of-the-river while the Makú were described as Indians-of-the-forest.

== Relationships with other indigenous groups ==
The Hupd'äh maintain complex and permanent historical relationships with the Tukanoan, Desana, Tuyuka, and Tariano Indigenous peoples of the Vaupés, Tiquié, and Papuri rivers. This peculiar inter-ethnic relationship is part of the traditions of the peoples of this region, and its preservation would likely guarantee the cultural equilibrium of the peoples of the region. The relationship has already been described as symbiotic, asymmetric and hierarchical, or as an employer/employee relationship. The Tukanoan justify their behavior through myths that tell of the origins of the tribes of the region. The Hupda, according to Tukanoan versions of the myths, were the last to come into world. Consequently, they are considered inferior, lowest on the hierarchy of intertribal relations in the Vaupés river basin and, because of this, must perform work deemed inferior, which only the lowest ranking clans in the hierarchy perform.

== Language ==
The Hupd'äh call the Tukanoan "sokw’ät-d’äh," which translates as toucan. They also refer to the Tukanoan as "wóh", "wóh-d’äh". These terms are used generically, with no distinction as to which linguistic group the other person belongs to. The words used by the Hupda to distinguish the other social groups with which they interact are "tëghõih-d’äh" for non-Indians and agents of the national society. Literally it means 'the sound of the burning fire wood' and is those who come from outside, the white men, coming from the East and owning many things. It has been suggested that the name is derived from the sound of a firearm. For missionaries they use the term "páíd’äh", distinguishing them as a separate social category to the tëghõih-d’äh.

The term "mer'ah" means "from the east" or "from below" contrasting "pör'ah," which means "from the west" or "from above" always using the river as a reference. These terms are also used in relation to directions of travel. An individual will always explain the location of individual groups in this way, without ever defining a boundary, be it linguistic or territorial, as all Hupda consider themselves brothers and part of the same Hup world. They may even say that others talk differently. It may simply be a case of different accent or a few words of the vocabulary.

== Culture and nuclear family ==
The Hupd'äh, as hunters, know the forest intimately and do not work in agriculture, which their neighbors do extensively. They are scattered among more than 20 clans. Each of the clans shares a common ancestry and a set of rituals specific to each clan. Marriages are made between clans, as a marriage inside a clan is considered to be incestuous. The married man can live, most commonly, in his father's local group or in his father-in-law's local group. And as all the clans native to the Alto Rio Negro area practice Dabucuri and celebrate Jurupari, the Hupda maintain their own kapi-vaiyá.

The hearth group, "kakah", is the smallest unit of production and consumption, and can be made up of a nuclear family; it may also include additional persons (mothers-in-law, orphaned nephews, widowed uncles) making it into an extended family. There is no ideal group size, and numbers vary enormously between one local group and another. A hearth group is significantly autonomous, is generally the social unit, which visits other local groups, and is the most mobile part of the local group. The general rule is that the hearth group be self-sufficient and, to that end, each hearth group generally contains two adults, a man and a woman, almost always married to each other. Two couples are never part of the same hearth group while the minimum number of people in a hearth group is two.

== Hayám - the local group ==
The Hupda live in small villages. The local group is normally known as a "hayam" although there are in fact three other ways it may be named. These terms are related to the local geography:

1. "-deh," which means "stream"
2. "-nuh" (head), the source of the stream
3. "-buk" indicates the group stays in a clearing

A local group is completely autonomous and, may join another group or split itself between two others. This may cause its transit around relations to be seriously modified from one year to the next. There is no fixed village or camp. The local group is described by reference to the sources of the streams on which it where they live for a particular period. Some groups may reside in one location for years and still give the impression that they are only there temporarily. The names given to these locations are the names of the small streams where they draw water.

These local groups ["hayám"] can contain from 15 to more than 50 people and generally each group comprises members of one or two clans. Some villages with more than this number of inhabitants because of the work of missionaries. Each local group is made up of several hearth groups. These hearth groups are smallest unit of production and consumption, and are usually made up of a nuclear family and, in some cases, those who have joined it. The local groups were based at the sources of the small streams, tributaries to Papuri, Japu and Tiquié rivers. The members of a local group wandered within a certain perimeter, always using as reference one of the streams; they did not however migrate beyond this specific territory. When they leave the territories, for a predetermined length of time, it is to hunt or visit the villages of their in-laws. These visits are periodic and are important to the regeneration of the renewable resources of the area where the local groups have established their villages. Frequently a hearth group may, during the year, move from one local group to another and stay for long or short periods of time. In fact, these long visits to other villages are common, and someone is always visiting a group. The mobility of the Hupda is impressive for their knowledge of all the existing trails {tíw hup} and where each local group is based.

In each local group there is an elderly male member who is considered the leader. He generally knows the history of the ancestors of the clan. These men are not always the chiefs (yo’òm ih), also called captain (capitão) in the local Portuguese dialect, and who are, in many cases, chosen to deal with missionaries and other agents. The captains of the local groups are the intermediaries between the non-Indians and the Hupda world. Frequently they need to be able to interpret clearly, for the local group, the ideas and concepts of the missionaries and other agents of the national society who pass through the villages. The job is not easy.

== Lineage and clans ==
The Hupda social groups are based on unilinear descent, with patrilinear clans, and dispersed in exogamic units. The term clan is being used to describe the basic unit of Hupda society. The Hupda clan does not have a very specific geographical area/location as is found with the Tukanoan clans. The clan is a grouping that gathers members with a common ancestor.

Within the concept of Hupda life and the dynamics of social interaction, the clan is of less importance than the local group as it is difficult to identify a local group with a specific clan. It is in the local group that the idea of brotherhood and a concept of territoriality is developed. The concept of territoriality is important to social interactions between the different local groups. The geographic area inhabited by a local group indicates the sense of belonging to a local group but not to a clan. The dabucuri celebrations ("pä’") take place between local groups and not different clans. The clans interact as "yawám", those with a common ancestor, or "kót", those directly related to each other. Within the clans sharing a common ancestor a hierarchy exists from the most senior, "ó", to the most junior, "púy". In some larger clans, like for example the "Sokw’ätnohk’ödtëh" from the middle of the Tiquié river, there are several lines of patrilinear descent while all the members consider themselves descended from a common ancestor. These relationships cannot be illustrated in their genealogies by the members of the clans.

Each clan knows a specific set of ceremonies and stories and this knowledge is shared among all its members. The most important ceremony a clan has is the one that gives (transmits) its name. It is generally performed by the oldest male in the clan who has a direct familial relationship with the person receiving the name or by the father's father if he is still alive.. The ritual is generally called "bi’ìd - hàt" or name of ceremony. This is a naming ritual where the name of an ancestor is changed and is given to a newborn child. The name is used in everyday life and there is no secrecy about the "bi’ìd - hàt". Each clan has a set of five to seven proper names for each sex. These names are repeated and are given in the birth order of the ancestors. This is seen in fact as the newborn child being swapped for an ancestor. When the swap is made, the child becomes a member of the clan. The first-born son will be given his grandfather's name who in turn received it from his grandfather. The subsequent boys can be given the names of any younger brothers the grandfather had, in no particular order. The name, apart from legitimizing an individual as a member of a clan, defines the person's place in the hierarchy. Thus to have the "bi’ìd - hàt" is to belong to a clan. To have the name shows a right to, and a possibility of access to, all the knowledge specific to the clan as well as a set of privileges, be they social, economic or ritual. The bearer of a clan name must observe and honor all the responsibilities assigned to their clan.

There must be, in the region between the Papuri and Tiquié rivers, about 20 named clans. The clans are connected by a hierarchy and scattered across the area; there is no direct link between a clan and a territory. The hierarchy between the clans is not rigid, as can be seen among the Tukanoan. The process of splitting a clan takes place in response to reduced (natural) resources in particular areas. The clan has no property but is associated with a specific area. For example, all the members of the "Dehpuhtèh" clan came from the East, they have even said they came from Belém do Pará.

Marriages allowed within the classes of relatives include bilateral cross cousins. The exogamic unit in the Hupda social structure is the clan, patrilinear and patrilocal for preference. The terminology of the kinship of the Hupda has five distinct generations, two above and two below a generation. All the terms of kinship refer to members of the family, real or fictive. The second generation (-2) does not distinguish between affinal and consanguine relatives. All the terms, except mother and father, refer to the real and fictive relative. The terms of kinship identify individuals according to each generation, gender, affinals and cosanguines. The most important kinship term used by the Hupda is the regulation of marriage. In other words, according to them, the preferred marriage is between fictive relatives, or in other words, bilateral cross cousins of the same generation.

== The role of the Vaupés river ==
The Vaupés river, where it is principally the Tukanoan who are present, is where most of the outside resources are found, in exchange for work. These are commercial relationships. For the Hupda, this is where the illnesses and curses (of society) come from. The behavior of a Hupda in this environment is, almost always, one of total submission to any and all order. In this environment, where the two apparently contrary tribes interact, age is irrelevant, the setting is defined and dialogue is short and decorous on all parts. It is rare for Hupda to go to Tukanoan villages without being invited or contracted for a job. The reverse is not true. The Tukanoan go to Hupda villages whenever they feel like it, sometimes simply for a walk or to collect things such as cured meat or fish. The relationships between the Hupda and a specific Tukanoan village are enduring if not permanent. It is an employment relationship and can be seen as a boss/employee relationship. These relationships can be individual or may include the whole hearth group. For this reason, the Hupda do not feel comfortable in the Tukanoan village and will not remain there any longer than they have to; they are also afraid of catching diseases. The Hupda perceive the land on the banks of the rivers as belonging to the Tukanoan and their existence is based around this assumption. The Hupda feel most at home and comfortable in the forests. It is where they feel safest from outside threats and find the resources to allow them to survive for long periods of time, without having to move to the banks of the river. In the clearings, where their houses are found, behavior is governed by a different set of rules. The clearing is the special place for ceremonies and socializing with other Hupda.

The Hupda share the Vaupés river basin with its other inhabitants, as a common environment, living a lifestyle differentiated from others, in its adaptive form, by ideological factors. These ideological factors are dictated by an interpretation of the world, based on a mythological corpus, that assures them a specific role in social and inter-ethnic relations in a hierarchical system. Thus to characterize them simply as hunters, gatherers, nomads, or semi-nomads to differentiate them from other tribes in the region is only relevant at the first level of analysis, where differences between tribes are established, possibly, based on their individual technical-economic systems. In this model are contained the inter-ethnic relations and the use of the land among the human resources necessary for the organization of the land and forest resources, the impact of human activities upon these resources and, most importantly, the maintenance of a balance between the various peoples sharing the region.

== Cosmology ==
The concept of illness among the Hupda is based on their perception of their presence on this world as defined by their view of the world and humanity. Their cosmology has as a principal feature several worlds superimposed on each other. The terrestrial world [s’áh] is the one we live in our bodies [sáp] and that is found between two ends of a continuous plane. On the East side [mer’ah] is the "wedó ip mòy" (house of the father of the sun and moon) and at the (other) West [pör’ah] end is the "s’áh-tút" from where all the river waters flow and where the cold is found. The other worlds are stacked vertically beneath the earth and the waters (s’àk e o pèj mòy - world of the umari and the spirits) and above them, towards the infinite sky (K’èg-teh mòy, wero-meh mòy wã-mòy / world of K’èg-teh - principal hero and creator of earthly beings, of the stars, of the birds and the vultures). These worlds are all inhabited by mythological beings in the forms of animals, fruits and energies. The terrestrial world is stuck, or as they say tied, by cipó [yúb-tut], an energy whose main source is the coca plant[pu’uk].

The body [sáp] of the Hupda and of all humans is in contrast to all the "live" beings, which can be classified as "spirits" and which manifest in non-corporeal forms. The Hupda tell that in their bodies there is a point where an energy called "hawäg" is found. They are unanimous in their assertion that it is found in their chests at the same height as their hearts. In fact, the Hupda word for heart is the same, "hawäg". As people are born, and when they receive their clan names, they become stronger and thus begins the process of the growth of "hawäg," which is initially small and grows at the same time as the physical body.

When cocoa [pu’úk], tobacco [hunt], paricá [seâheak] or kapi are used the "hawäg" can be perceived. The shaman [bi’id-ih] uses these plants to dream and thus diagnose the patient's illness. The shaman is the only one, who in a trance or dream, perceives the patient's "hawäg". A Hupda, as well as having a body [sáp] with a "hawäg" (point of vital energy), also has a "b’atub’," which could be referred to as their shadow or personal ghost. This entity is generally associated with negative and malevolent influences. This term is also confused with "devil" due to the Catholic influence. The bodies of animal merely have the "hawäg", they don't have "b’atub’ ". Some say that dogs may have "b’atub’ " as they can see others in the dark.

If life and consciousness arise as a result of the development of the "hawäg", death occurs when a person loses their (own) "hawäg". After death the body (sáp) is buried and the "hawäg" goes to the spirit world, which is close to the world of "K’èg-teâh" and other heroes, up in the sky. The ghost (b’atöb’) remains on earth for a while, afterwards going to a world found beneath the waters form which it can, every so often, reappear on the earth. The material parts of the "b’atöb’" are in all the body's secretions such as urine, sweat, catarrh, blood and faeces. It is by way of the orifices from which these secretions emanate that illnesses may enter (the body).

Illness and health are therefore the result of the balance between the two forces in the body, the "hawäg" and the "b’atub’". Each initiate knows the ceremonies for the protection and strengthening of the "hawäg". All the curing ceremonies [bi’in dóhoité] invoke the forces of the forest to strengthen the "hawäg" and reduce the influence of the ghosts upon the "hawäg". If a Hupda is ill or feels unwell, it is common to see them pointing initially at their heart, even if the illness is found somewhere else in their body. The illness shows then, in final analysis, a weakness of the "hawäg" and a dominion of the "b’atub’" over the physical body.

== Medical system ==
The medical system of the Hupda is a shamanic system, both in the way it refers to health and illness and in the way illness is treated. It is mediated by people, usually men, initiates and possessors of 'keys' that allow them access to various worlds in search of understanding for the events occurring on earth (s’ah). Each clan has specific knowledge on a way of treating illness. According to the Hupda, everything that happens on this world (or plane) has already happened in some form in the other worlds in the past (myths). As a result, everything has a meaning and these meanings can be found in the stories of "K’èg-teh".

Illnesses can be classified as follows:

- Those that lead to death, the most serious and deadly ones - these are caused by enchantments, whose origins are hard to find, caused by other people
- Those caused by prepared poisons that have been mixed into the food and drink—these can be cured as long as the source (where it came from and who sent it) is known
- Illnesses arising from the forest, river or caused by the spirits—for this type of illness cures can be found which are given by means of ceremony (bi’id)

The term "bi’id" covers a set of rituals that range from the most basic blessing to the most complex magic. All the healing practices are done by means of the word. The term "Bi’in" ("sopro") is translated as 'breath' or 'blow' alluding to the way in which the shaman recites the formulas, in a susurration of words with a "cuia" (gourd made from the fruit of Lagenaria vulgaris) near his mouth. In the local Portuguese dialect the term "sopro" is associated with this practice. Generally the point is to reinforce the "hawäg," which is sited where the heart is, and to diminish the power of the "b’atub’" over the "sáp". This work can take hours. The patient must observe a special diet to get the desired effect. The diets generally involve abstaining from cooked meats, salt and peppers. Another common abstention, almost always required, is that of not touching menstruating women and of sexual abstinence for a prescribed period. The patient must generally remain lying down for the majority of this period.[Renato Athias]
