= Kakua people =

Kãkwã
Total population
- Colombia 250

Regions with significant populations
- Wacará: 183
- Nuevo Pueblo: 45

Languages
- Kãkwã

Religion
- Christians

Related ethnic groups
- Nukak, Hupda

Kãkwã, Cacua or Bará-maku are an indigenous people living in northwestern Amazonia, between Vaupés, Querarí and Papuri rivers, in Colombia, close to the border with Brazil, within Vaupés indigenous Resguardo. The Kãkwã are approximately 250 people, who speak their own language, which is part of the Macu family and is closely related to the Nukak language.

Each Kãkwã is part of an exogamous patrilineal clan. The clans engage in marital exchanges and consider themselves "baih", brothers-in-law or bilateral cross-cousins.

Originally nomadic hunter-gatherers, later subjected to the neighboring ethnic groups, but currently established in the towns of Wacará and Pueblo Nuevo, their main activity is agriculture, although they continue to hunt and fish.
