= Guaviare =

Guaviare may refer to:

- Guaviare Department of Colombia
- Guaviare River
- any of several languages named after the river, especially Nukak
