= Amazonian languages =

Indigenous languages of Greater Amazonia

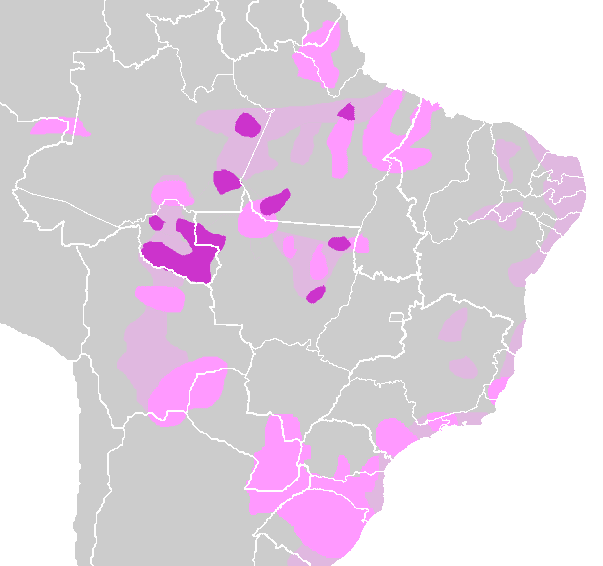
The Tupian language family is the language family most widely spoken in the Amazon.

Amazonian languages is the term used to refer to the indigenous languages of "Greater Amazonia." This area is significantly larger than the Amazon and extends from the Atlantic coast all the way to the Andes, while its southern border is usually said to be the Paraná. The region is inhabited by societies that share many cultural traits but whose languages are characterized by great diversity. There are about 330 extant languages in Greater Amazonia, almost half of which have fewer than 500 speakers. Meanwhile, only Wayuu has greater than 100,000 speakers (about 300,000). Of the 330 total languages, about fifty are isolates, while the remaining ones belong to about 25 different families. Most of the posited families have few members. It is this distribution of many small and historically unrelated speech communities that makes Amazonia one of the most linguistically diverse regions in the world. The precise reasons for this unusual diversity have not yet been conclusively determined, but Amazonian languages seem to have had fewer than 10,000 native speakers even before the invasion of European colonists wrought havoc on the societies by which they were spoken. Despite the large-scale diversity, the long-term contact among many of the languages of Greater Amazonia has created similarities between many neighboring languages that are not genetically related. Most indigenous Amazonian people today are bilingual or even monolingual in English, Spanish, Portuguese, French or Dutch and many Amazonian languages are endangered as a result.

== Linguistic diversity ==
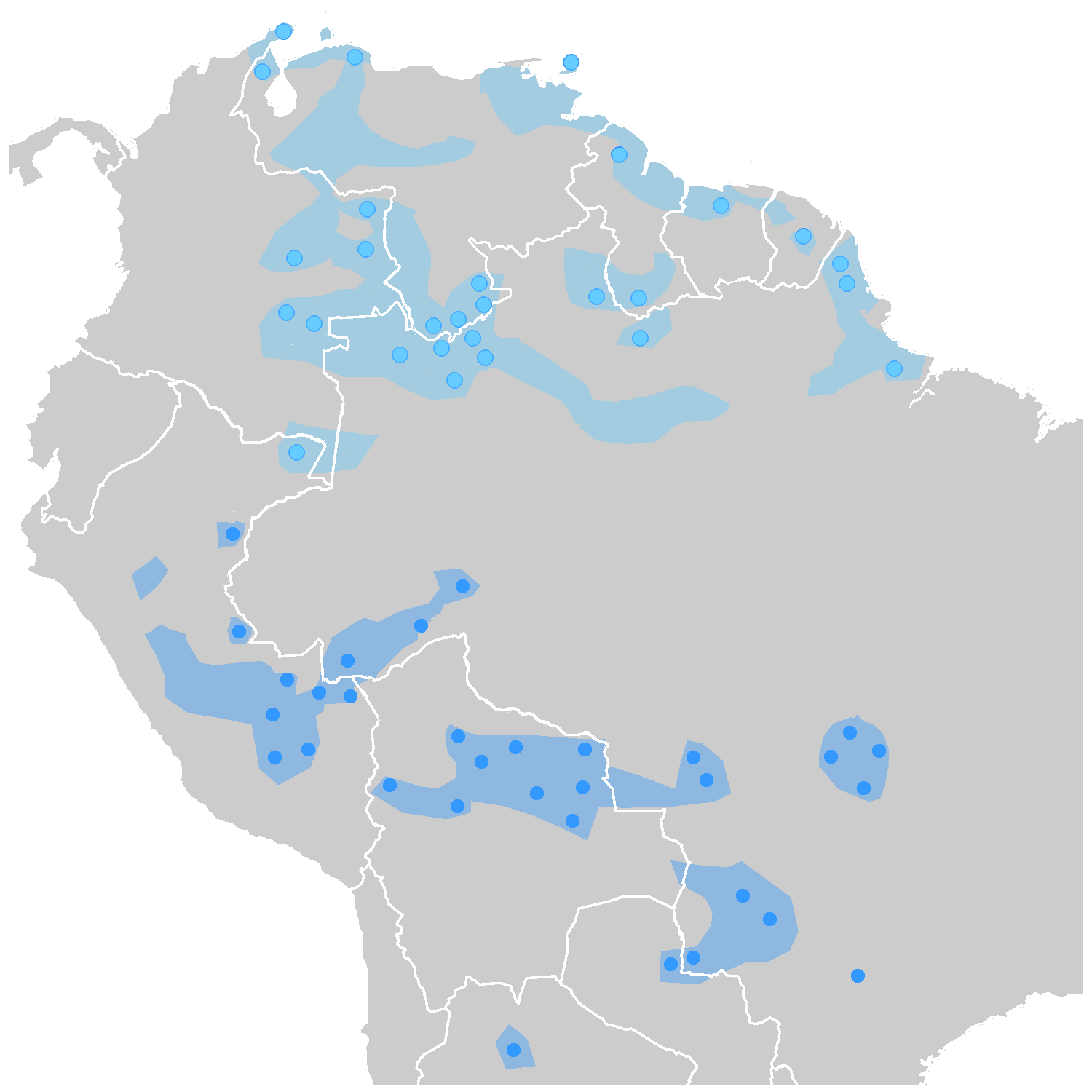
The Arawak languages of South America, the second largest family of Amazonian languages. The dark blue shows Southern Arawak languages.

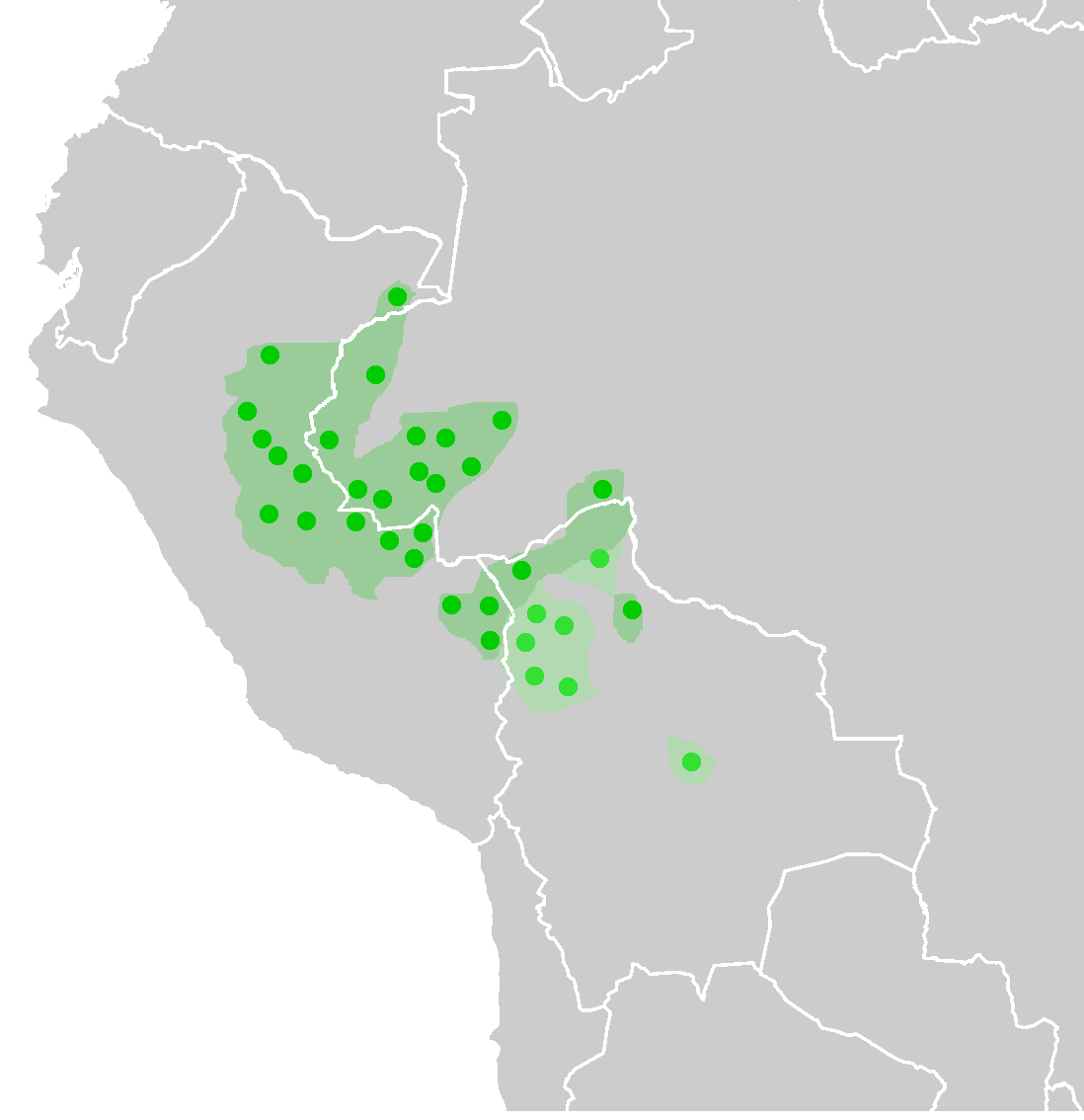
Pano-Tacanan languages: Pano (dark green) and Takana (light green), the points indicating the documented localizations of the languages.

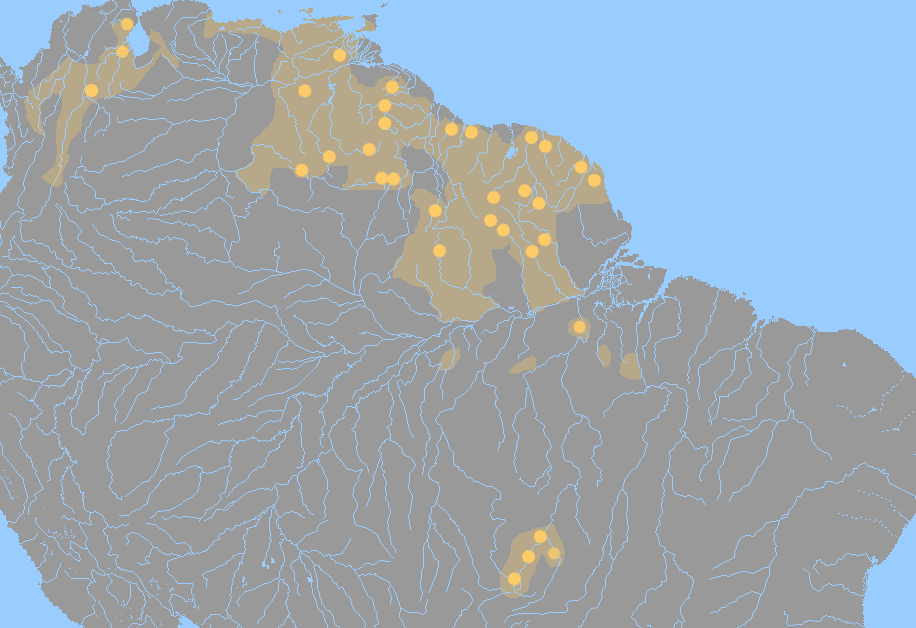
Present location of Cariban languages, c. 2000, and probable extent in the 16th century.

A variety of macro-groupings have been suggested for the Amazonian languages families, like the one suggested by Joseph Greenberg; however, these theories are not widely supported. Often, similarities between languages are due to language contact rather than due to genetic relationship. This illustrates that a lack of contact between communities is not necessary to maintain linguistic diversity. A vast amount of linguistic research is presently being undertaken to better understand the relations between the languages of Greater Amazonia.

Of the above-mentioned 25 or so language families, the following six are the major ones:

- Tupian: consisting of 70-80 languages. The languages belonging to the largest sub-group, Tupí-Guaraní, are spoken almost across the entire northern half of South America. Their most prominent typological feature is an intricate system of person marking on verbs.
- Macro-Jê: consisting of 30-40 languages, largely spoken in the southeast of the region, with some outliers closer to the Basin. The languages have unusually large vowel and unusually small consonant inventories.
- Cariban: consisting of 40-50 languages. They are mostly found in the very north of South America, with some outliers closer to the Basin. Many of these languages have an object-initial word order.
- Arawakan: consisting of 70-80 languages. They cluster in the south, west and northwest of the region. Some important typological features are possession marking on nouns and split intransitivity based on verb type (active vs. stative).
- Panoan: consisting of 30-40 languages, mostly in the south and southwest of the region. Some of their main characteristics are split alignment and complex switch reference systems.
- Tukanoan: consisting of 20-30 languages, which are overwhelmingly spoken in the southern half of Colombia. The languages are known, amongst other things, for their extensive evidential and noun classifier systems.

Multilingualism is normal among Amazonian Indians. In fact, the value that many inhabitants of Amazonia assign to multilingualism is sometimes seen as a reason for the longevity of the linguistic diversity in the region.

== History of the Amazonian villages ==
The majority of the Amazon Basin and the Orinoco are the lowlands of a tropical rainforest, rich in edible vegetables and animals. Archeologists estimate that this territory has been populated for less than 12,000 years. The entire population of the area would have arrived only a couple millennia ago.

Approximately 9,000 years ago, new migrants largely replaced the earlier populations associated with the Clovis culture across the entire continent, including the Amazon. Around 3,000 years ago, speakers of Arawakan languages spread along river systems from western and central Amazonia into northern South America and the Caribbean. Around the same time, Tupian-speaking peoples began expanding from southwestern Amazonia, with speakers of the Tupi–Guarani languages later spreading to other parts of South America. Between the 4th and 10th centuries AD, groups of Carib-speaking peoples also spread from northern Amazonia and the Orinoco region to Guyana and to the middle and lower Amazon.

The principal source of protein is fish, supplemented by hunting pecaris, tapirs, rodents and monkeys. The domestication of plants, at first concentrated in the bitter yuca root, dates back 5,000 years. The Neolithic Revolution brought agricultural expansion, with its version of slash and burn cultivation, began in the mountainsides of the western Andes and was brought to the majority of the main rivers in the Amazon. The villages based on hunting and gathering were pushed to the more inaccessible areas.

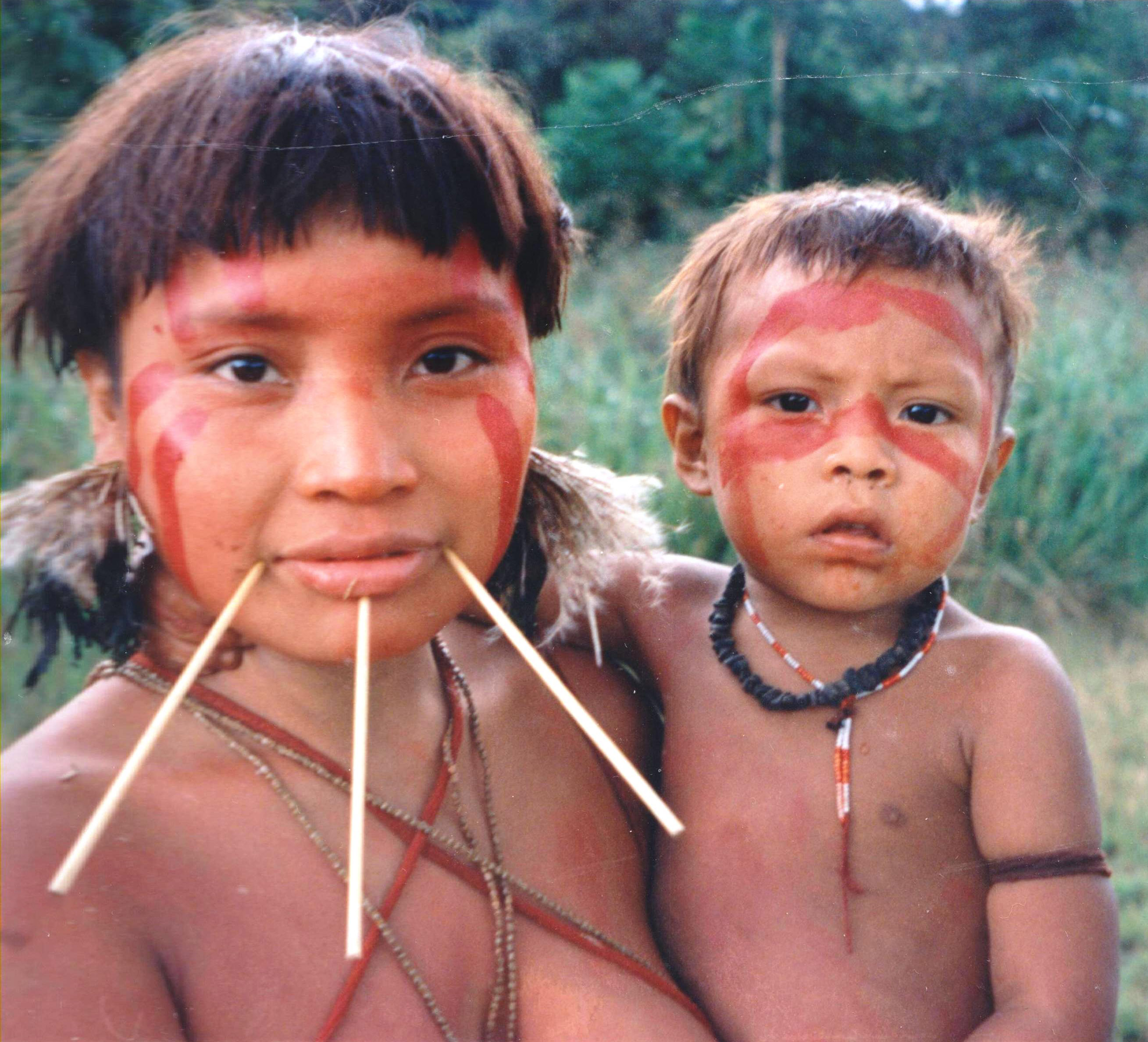
Yanomami woman and her child in 1997

Each linguistic group tends to share certain characteristics relative to the type of territory they occupy, the mode of production and the material culture. For example, practically all the ethnic groups of the Arawakan, Cariban, and Tupi families occupy areas of tropical rainforest, extensively use agriculture and make canoes, hammocks, and ceramics. On the other hand, the Gê ethnic groups usually live in grasslands, have little agriculture and do not make canoes, hammocks, or ceramics. Nevertheless, they have a more complex social organization. Scattered among the farming villages, in the heart of the jungle, live hunter-gatherers that belong to minor language families, such as the Nadahup, Pirahã and Guajiboan families, more or less the direct descendants of the first hunter-gatherers.

Some groups, especially the agriculturally based ones, have been particularly aggressive and are prone to attack their neighbours. Nevertheless, symbiotic relations exist between different groups: for example the Tucanoans, who are agricultural based, trade with the Nadahup, who are hunter-gatherers. The latter provide animal meat from the jungle and poison obtained from fish, and in exchange receive tapioca flour from the Tucanoan plantations, as well as ceramics. Even so, the Nadahup are considered "inferior" by the Tucanoans and are not considered in inter-ethnic marriage as the Tucanoans do with other ethnic groups.

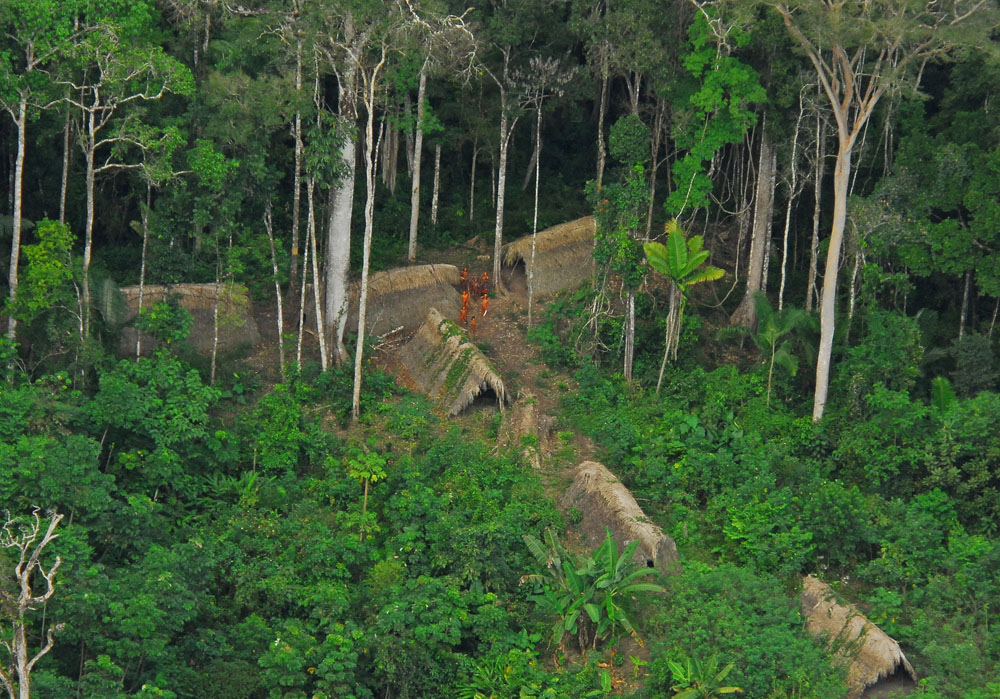
Members of an uncontacted tribe encountered in the Brazilian state of Acre in 2009

The Spanish and Portuguese invaded the region in the 16th century, quickly taking control of the coastal areas and the main rivers as far as they were navigable. The indigenous population began to drastically diminish around 1900; it is estimated that the population was only a 10th of what it had been in 1500 (estimated at between 2 and 5 million). The majority of this loss of life was involuntary, due to European diseases the native Amazonian population didn't have immunity to. The Europeans also used the native Amazonians as slaves. There are testimonies of the Europeans navigating upriver from the mouth of the Amazon, capturing entire tribes and carrying them downriver to the plantations where they worked under difficult conditions, dying in a few years. The Europeans, due to their superior weapons, were able to take whatever piece of land they wanted. Previously the incursions of the colonists were motivated by the possession of resources like rubber or certain minerals, that frequently were preceded by violent actions against the indigenous Amazonians.

== List of smaller families ==
The number of languages in each language family is in parentheses.

- Arawan (6)
- Boran (2)
- Cahuapanan (2)
- Chapacuran (12)
- Guajiboan (5)
- Harákmbut (2)
- Jirajaran † (3)
- Jivaroan (4)
- Katukinan (2)
- Nadahup (4)
- Nambikwaran (3)
- Otomákoan † (2)
- Peba–Yaguan (3)
- Tacanan (6)
- Timotean † (2)
- Tiniguan (2)
- Witotoan (8)
- Yanomaman (5)
- Zaparoan (9)

== See also ==
- Indigenous languages of South America
- List of indigenous languages of South America
