= Mouton Grammar Library =

Mouton Grammar Library (MGL) is a linguistic book series dedicated to the description of languages from around the world. It has been published since 1985 by De Gruyter Brill and has now reached nearly one hundred volumes. It is edited by Georg Bossong (de), Patience L. Epps, and Irina Nikolaeva. Its ISSN is 0933-7636.

The series imposes no restrictions regarding language families or geographic regions, and special attention is given to previously undescribed languages, while new and valuable descriptions of better-known languages are also included.

== Volumes ==
- 1 A Grammar of The Pipil Language of El Salvador – Lyle Campbell (1985)
- 2 A Grammar of Modern Breton – Ian J. Press (1986)
- 3 A Grammar of Kilivila – Gunter Senft (de) (1986)
- 4 A Grammar of Limbu – George van Driem (1987)
- 5 A Grammar of Slave – Keren Rice (1989)
- 6 A Grammar of Tauya – Lorna MacDonald (1990)
- 7 A Grammar of Lango – Michael Noonan (1992)
- 8 A Grammar of Afrikaans – Bruce C. Donaldson (1993)
- 9 A Grammar of Lezgian – Martin Haspelmath (1993)
- 10 A Grammar of Dumi – George van Driem (1993)
- 11 A Grammar of Wardaman – Francesca C. Merlan (1994)
- 12 A Grammar of Berbice Dutch Creole – Silvia Kouwenberg (1994)
- 13 A Grammar of Norman French of the Channel Islands – Anthony Liddicoat (1994)
- 14 A Grammar of Supyire – Robert Carlson (1994)
- 15 A Grammar of Kayardild – Nicholas D. Evans (1995)
- 16 A Grammar of Kisi – G. Tucker Childs (1995)
- 17 A Grammar of Meithei – Shobhana Lakshmi Chelliah (1997)
- 18 A Grammar of Kambera – Marian Klamer (1998)
- 19 A Grammar of Koyra Chiini – Jeffrey Heath (1999)
- 20 A Grammar of Tukang Besi – Mark Donohue (1999)
- 21 A Grammar of Hdi – Zygmunt Frajzyngier (2002)
- 22 A Grammar of Udihe – Irina Nikolaeva, Maria Tolskaya (2001)
- 23 A Grammar of Jamul Tiipay – Amy Miller (2001)
- 24 A Grammar of Gaagudju – Mark Harvey (2002)
- 25 A Grammar of Fongbe – Claire Lefebvre, Anne-Marie Brousseau (2002)
- 26 A Grammar of Basque – José Ignacio Hualde, Jon Ortiz de Urbina (2003)
- 27 A Grammar of Kolyma Yukaghir – Elena Maslova (2003)
- 29 A Grammar of Kwaza – Hein van der Voort (2004)
- 30 A Grammar of Lavukaleve – Angela Terrill (2003)
- 31 A Grammar of Qiang – Randy J. LaPolla, Chenglong Huang (2003)
- 32 A Grammar of Ma'di – Mairi Blackings, Nigel Fabb (2003)
- 33 A Grammar of Mosetén – Jeanette Sakel (2004)
- 35 A Grammar of Tamashek (Tuareg of Mali) – Jeffrey Heath (2005)
- 36 A Grammar of Mina – Zygmunt Frajzyngier, Eric Johnston, Adrian Edwards (2005)
- 37 A Grammar of Urarina – Knut J. Olawsky (2006)
- 38 A Grammar of Lao – N.J. Enfield (2007)
- 39 A Grammar of Mongsen Ao – A.R. Coupe (2007)
- 40 A Grammar of Dolakha Newar – Carol Genetti (2007)
- 41 A Grammar of Mapuche – Ineke Smeets (2008)
- 42 A Grammar of Toqabaqita – Frantisek Lichtenberk (2008)
- 43 A Grammar of Hup – Patience Epps (2008)
- 44 A Grammar of Cavineña – Antoine Guillaume (2008)
- 45 A Grammar of Jamsay – Jeffrey Heath (2008)
- 46 A Grammar of Eton – Mark L.O. Van de Velde (2008)
- 47 A Grammar of Wandala – Zygmunt Frajzyngier (2012)
- 49 A Grammar of Teiwa – Marian Klamer (2010)
- 50 A Grammar of Madurese – William D. Davies (2010)
- 51 A Grammar of Goemai – Birgit Hellwig (2011)
- 52 A Grammar of Vaeakau-Taumako – Åshild Næss, Even Hovdhaugen (2011)
- 53 A Grammar of Warrongo – Tasaku Tsunoda (2012)
- 54 A Grammar of Mani – G. Tucker Childs (2012)
- 55 A Grammar of Mian – Sebastian Fedden (2011)
- 56 A Grammar of Saramaccan Creole – John H. McWhorter, Jeff Good (2012)
- 57 A Grammar of Bardi – Claire Louise Bowern (2012)
- 58 A Grammar of Central Alaskan Yupik (CAY) – Osahito Miyaoka (2012)
- 59 A Grammar of Domari – Yaron Matras (2012)
- 60 A Grammar of Neverver – Julie Barbour (2012)
- 61 A Grammar of Savosavo – Claudia Wegener (2012)
- 62 A Grammar of Tommo So – Laura McPherson (2013)
- 63 A Grammar of Hinuq – Diana Forker (2013)
- 64 A Grammar of Nuosu – Matthias Gerner (2013)
- 65 A Grammar of Tundra Nenets – Irina Nikolaeva (2014)
- 66 A Grammar of Kulina – Stefan Dienst (2014)
- 67 A Grammar of Daakaka – Kilu von Prince (2015)
- 68 A Grammar of Aguaruna (Iiniá Chicham) – Simon E. Overall (2017)
- 69 A Grammar of Alto Perené (Arawak) – Elena Mihas (2015)
- 71 A Grammar of Bunan – Manuel Widmer (2017)
- 72 A Grammar of Emai – Ronald P. Schaefer, Francis O. Egbokhare (2017)
- 73 A Grammar of Sierra Popoluca – Lynda Boudreault (2018)
- 74 A Grammar of Kuuk Thaayorre – Alice R. Gaby (2017)
- 75 A Grammar of Kakataibo – Roberto Zariquiey (2018)
- 76 A Grammar of Bangime – Jeffrey Heath, Abbie Hantgan (2018)
- 77 A Grammar of Khatso – Chris Donlay (2019)
- 78 A Grammar of Belep – Chelsea McCracken (2019)
- 79 A Grammar of Qaqet – Birgit Hellwig (2019)
- 80 A Grammar of Gurung – Kristine A. Hildebrandt (2025)
- 81 A Grammar of Fa d'Ambô – Tjerk Hagemeijer, Philippe Maurer-Cecchini, Armando Zamora Segorbe (2020)
- 82 A Grammar of Karbi – Linda Konnerth (2020)
- 83 A Grammar of Seenku – Laura McPherson (2020)
- 84 A Grammar of Xong – Adam Sposato (2021)
- 86 A Grammar of Bunaq – Antoinette Schapper (2022)
- 87 A Grammar of Coastal Marind – Bruno Olsson (2021)
- 88 A Grammar of Eyak – Michael E. Krauss, Kevin Baetscher, Gary Holton (2025)
- 89 A Grammar of Kunbarlang – Ivan Kapitonov (2021)
- 90 A Grammar of Modern Baba Malay – Nala H. Lee (2022)
- 91 A Grammar of Gurindji – Felicity Meakins, Patrick McConvell (2021)
- 92 A Grammar of Ngardi – Thomas Ennever (2021)
- 96 A Grammar of Teotitlán del Valle Zapotec – Ambrocio Gutiérrez, Hiroto Uchihara (2026)
- 97 A Grammar of Pangkhua – Zahid Akter (2024)
- 99 A Grammar of Hmong. White Hmong and Green Mong as Spoken in North Queensland – Nathan M. White (2025)

== See also ==
- Lists of languages
