= Dâw people =

Dâw
Total population
- 94

Regions with significant populations
- Amazonas, Brazil

Languages
- Dâw language

Related ethnic groups
- Nadëb, Nukak, Hup

The Dâw are an Indigenous people of Brazil. They live on the right bank of Rio Negro in an area commonly known as Alto Rio Negro in the Amazon rainforest. They share this area together with a number of other Indigenous peoples, including the other Nadahup people, which they are closely related to, such as the Nadëb, the Nukak, and the Hup - but also Arawakan and Tucanoan peoples, such as the Barasana and Tucano.

The word Dâw is a self-designation, meaning people. In literature, as well as in Alto Rio Negro, they are often referred to as Kamã, but this name is considered very pejorative.

During the 1980s the Dâw were close to extinction due to an unbalance between the number of men and women. There were few women, and many of those left were old and unable to conceive. In 1984, the number of Dâw was only 56. Since then, the situation has improved considerably, and the Dâw are no longer threatened by extinction in spite of the low population. Today, all Dâw have the Dâw language as their first language, while many also speak Nheengatu and Portuguese.

Today, the Dâw are in a permanent contact with non-indigenous people, mostly in the nearby city, São Gabriel da Cachoeira.
