= Nadahup languages =

Language family of South America

Nadahup
- Naduhup, Makú
- Geographic distribution: Amazon
- Linguistic classification: One of the world's primary language families
- Subdivisions: Nadëb–Kuyawi; Daw; Hupda–Yuhup

Language codes
- Glottolog: nada1235
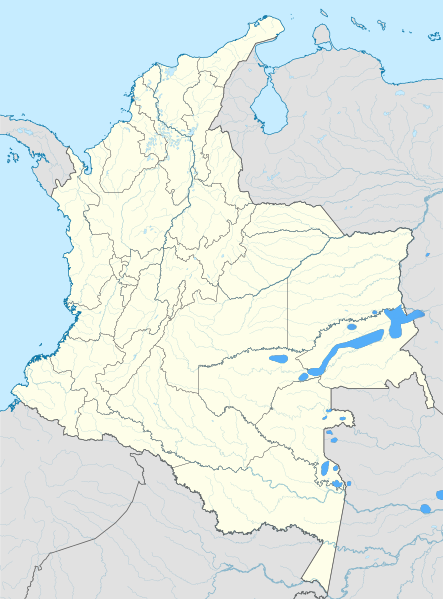

The Nadahup languages, also known as Makú (Macú) or Vaupés–Japurá, form a small language family in Brazil, Colombia, and Venezuela. The name Makú is pejorative, being derived from an Arawakan word meaning "without speech". Nadahup is an acronym of the constituent languages.

The Nadahup family should not be confused with several other languages which go by the name Makú. There are proposals linking this unclassified language with Nadahup, but also with other languages.

== External relationships ==
Martins (2005: 342–370) groups the Arawakan and Nadahup languages together as part of a proposed Makúan-Arawakan (Nadahup-Arawakan) family, but this proposal has been rejected by Aikhenvald (2006: 237).

Epps and Bolaños (2017) accept the unity of the four Nadahup languages, but do not consider Puinave to be related.

== Language contact ==
Jolkesky (2016) notes that there are lexical similarities with the Arawa, Guahibo, and Tupi language families due to contact. A discussion of lexical and phonological correspondences between the Nadahup (Vaupés-Japurá) and Tupi languages can be found in Jolkesky and Cabral (2011). Nadahup languages also have various loanwords from Tucanoan languages and Nheengatu.

== Languages ==
Nadahup consists of about four languages, based on mutual intelligibility. Nadeb and Kuyawi, Hup and Yahup, and Nukak and Kakwa, however, share 90% of their vocabulary and are mutually intelligible, and so are separate languages only in a sociolinguistic sense. These four branches are not close: Although the family was first suggested in 1906, only 300 cognates have been found, which include pronouns but no other grammatical forms.

gloss	Nadëb	Hup	Dâw	Nïkâk
father	ʔɨb	ʔip	ʔiːp	ʔiːp (Kakwa ʔip)
egg	tɨb	tip	tɨp	tip (Kakwa)
water	mi	mĩh	mĩʔ	mah (Kakwa)
tooth	təɡᵑ (Kuyawi)	təɡᵑ	təɡ	—
house	—	mõj	mɔ͂j	mɨ͂

Nadëb may be the most divergent; of the other languages, there is disagreement on the placement of Nïkâk. Martins (1999) proposes two classifications, pending further research:

Martins, proposal A

- Nadahup
  - Nadëb (also known as Kaburi; plus Kuyawi dialect)
  - Vaupés
    - Nïkâk (also known as Nukak, plus dialect Kakwa)
    - Dâw (also known as Kuri-Dou, pejorative Kamã)
    - Hup (also known as Jupdá; plus dialect Yuhup/Yahup)

Martins, proposal B

- Nadahup
  - Nadëb (with Kuyawi dialect)
  - Daw–Hup
    - Dâw
    - Hup (with Yuhup dialect)
  - Nïkâk (with Kakwa dialect)

However, Epps considers Hup and Yahup to be distinct languages, and maintains that the inclusion of the poorly attested Nukak and Kakwa has not been demonstrated and is in fact highly dubious:

Epps

- Nadahup
  - Nadëb (with Kuyawi dialect)
  - Vaupés
    - Dâw
    - - Hup
      - Yuhup

=== Jolkesky (2016) ===
Internal classification by Jolkesky (2016):

(† = extinct)

- Puinave-Nadahup
  - Nadahup
    - Nadëb
      - Nadëb do Rio Negro
      - Nadëb do Roçado
    - Hup-Dâw
      - Dâw
      - Hup
        - Hupda
        - Yuhup
  - Puinave-Kak
    - Puinave (Wãnsöhöt)
    - Kak
      - Kakwa
      - Nukak

This classification is also repeated in Nikulin (2019).

== Typology ==
Dâw and Hup—especially Hup—have undergone grammatical restructuring under Tucano influence. They have lost prefixes but acquired suffixes from grammaticalized verb roots. They also have heavily monosyllabic roots, as can be seen by the reduction of Portuguese loan words to their stressed syllable, as in Dâw yẽl’ "money", from Portuguese dinheiro. Nadëb and Nïkâk, on the other hand, have polysyllabic roots. Nïkâk allows a single prefix per word, whereas Nadëb, which lies outside the Vaupés language area, is heavily prefixing and polysynthetic: Up to nine prefixes per word (which is highly unusual for the Amazon), with incorporation of nouns, prepositions, and adverbs.

== Genetic relations ==
Rivet (from 1920), Kaufman (1994) and Pozzobon (1997) include Puinave within the family. However, many of the claimed cognate sets are spurious.

Henley, Mattéi-Müller and Reid (1996) present evidence that the Hodï language (also known as Yuwana) is related.

Puinavean forms part of a hypothetical Macro-Puinavean family along with the Arutani–Sape families and the Máku language.

Macro-Puinavean is included in Joseph Greenberg's larger Macro-Tucanoan stock, but this is universally rejected. Another spurious larger grouping is Morris Swadesh's Macro-Makú.

== Proto-language ==
For a list of selected Proto-Eastern Makú reconstructions by Martins (2005), see the corresponding Portuguese article.

== Bibliography ==
- Campbell, Lyle. (1997). American Indian languages: The historical linguistics of Native America. New York: Oxford University Press. ISBN 0-19-509427-1.
- Greenberg, Joseph H. (1987). Language in the Americas. Stanford: Stanford University Press.
- Henley, Paul; Marie-Claude Mattéi-Müller and Howard Reid (1996): "Cultural and linguistic affinities of the foraging people of North Amazonia: a new perspective"; Antropológica 83: 3–37. Caracas.
- Kaufman, Terrence. (1990). Language history in South America: What we know and how to know more. In D. L. Payne (Ed.), Amazonian linguistics: Studies in lowland South American languages (pp. 13–67). Austin: University of Texas Press. ISBN 0-292-70414-3.
- Kaufman, Terrence. (1992) Guta
- Kaufman, Terrence. (1994). The native languages of South America. In C. Mosley & R. E. Asher (Eds.), Atlas of the world's languages (pp. 46–76). London: Routledge.
- Pozzobon, Jorge (1997). Langue, société et numération chez les Indiens Makú (Haut Rio Negro, Brésil). Journal de la Société de Américanistes de París 83: 159–172. París.
- Rivet, Paul and Constant Tastevin 1920: "Affinités du Makú et du Puinave"; Journal de la Société des Américanistes de París, n.s. t XII: 69–82. París.
- Rivet, Paul; P. P. Kok and C. Tastevin 1925: "Nouvelle contributión à l'étude de la langue Makú; International Journal of American Linguistics, vol. 3, n. 24, p.p. 129–132. New York.

Lexicons

- Bolaños, K. (2010). Kakua phonology: first approach. University of Texas at Austin.
- Conduff, K. W. (2006). Diccionario situacional del idioma Nukak. Bogotá: Iglesia Cristiana Nuevos Horizontes.
- Erickson, T.; Erickson, C. G. (1993). Vocabulario Jupda-Español-Português. Santafé de Bogotá: Asociación Summer Institute of Linguistics.
- Maciel, I. (1991). Alguns aspectos fonológicos e morfológicos da língua Máku. Masters dissertation. Brasilia: Universidade de Brasília.
- Martins, V. (1999). Dicionário Nadëb Português / Português Nadëb. (Manuscript).
- Martins, V. (2005). Reconstrução Fonológica do Protomaku Oriental. Amsterdam: Vrije Universiteit Amsterdam. (Doctoral dissertation).
- Ramirez, H. (2006). A Língua dos Hupd'äh do Alto Rio Negro: dicionário e guia de conversação. São Paulo: Associação Saúde Sem Limites.
- Migliazza, E. C. (1965). Fonología Makú. Boletim do MPEG. Antropología, 25:1-17.
- Mattei-Müller, M. (n.d.). Vocabulario Comparativo Castellano-Kakwa Vaupes-Guaviare-Hodï. (Manuscript).
