= Nukak =

Indigenous people of Colombia

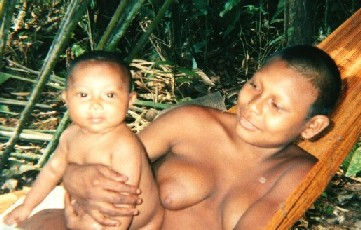
- A Nukak mother and child, 1993

Total population
- 968 (2023)

Regions with significant populations
- San José del Guaviare settlements: 210-250, Nukak Reservation: estimated at 500

Languages
- Nukak; Spanish (rare)

Religion
- Animist

Related ethnic groups
- Kãkwã; Other Makú peoples like Hupdu

The Nukak people [nɨkãk] (also Nukak-Makú) live between the Guaviare and Inírida rivers, in the depths of the tropical humid forest, on the fringe of the Amazon basin, in Guaviare Department, Republic of Colombia. They are nomadic hunter-gatherers with seasonal nomadic patterns and practice small-scale shifting horticulture. They were classified as an "uncontacted people" until 1981, and have since lost half of their population primarily to disease. Part of their territory has been used by coca growers, ranchers, and other settlers, as well as being occupied by guerrillas, army and paramilitaries. Responses to this crisis of land loss have included protests, requests for assimilation, and the suicide of leader Maw-be'. An estimated 210–250 Nukak people live in provisional settlements at San José del Guaviare, while around the same number live nomadically in the Nukak Reservation (Resguardo).

== Food acquisition ==
=== Hunting ===
Nukak are expert hunters. The men hunt with blowguns that shoot darts coated with curare "manyi", a poison made from different plants (curares). They hunt, in particular, several species of monkeys (Alouatta spp., Cebus spp., Saimiri sp., Lagothrix spp., Ateles sp., Saguinus spp., Callicebus torquatus), and birds (Muscovy duck, chachalacas, guans, curassows, grey-winged trumpeter and toucans). They also use javelins made out of Socratea exorrhiza palm wood to hunt two species of peccaries (Tayassu pecari and T. tajacu) and spectacled caimans, whose eggs they consume. Nukak neither hunt nor eat brocket deer, Odocoileus virginianus, and tapirs (Tapirus terrestris); they consider these animals to share a common ancestor with humans.

The Nukak also capture rodents (Cuniculus sp., Dasyprocta spp.), armadillos (Dasypus sp.), tortoises (Geochelone sp), frogs (in large quantities), crabs, shrimps, snails, larvae of palm weevils (mojojoy, "mun", Rhynchophorus spp.) and larvae of several species of wasps and caterpillars.

=== Fishing ===
The Nukak eat several species of fish, like Hoplias sp., Myloplus spp., Mylossoma spp., Hydrolycus sp., Cichla sp., surubí (Pseudoplatystoma fasciatum), catfishes (Brachyplatystoma spp.), piranhas (Serrasalmus spp., Pygocentrus spp.) and river rays (Potamotrygon sp.). Fishing is partly done with cord and metal fish hooks, although the Nukak still catch their fish traditionally with bow and arrow or harpoons, traps, or baskets ("mei", water cages). They also use a sophisticated technique that has been reported in several cultures: it uses nuún, the root of a Lonchocarpus sp. that contains a number of substances that when dissolved in the water streams stun the fish, making them easy to catch.

=== Gathering ===
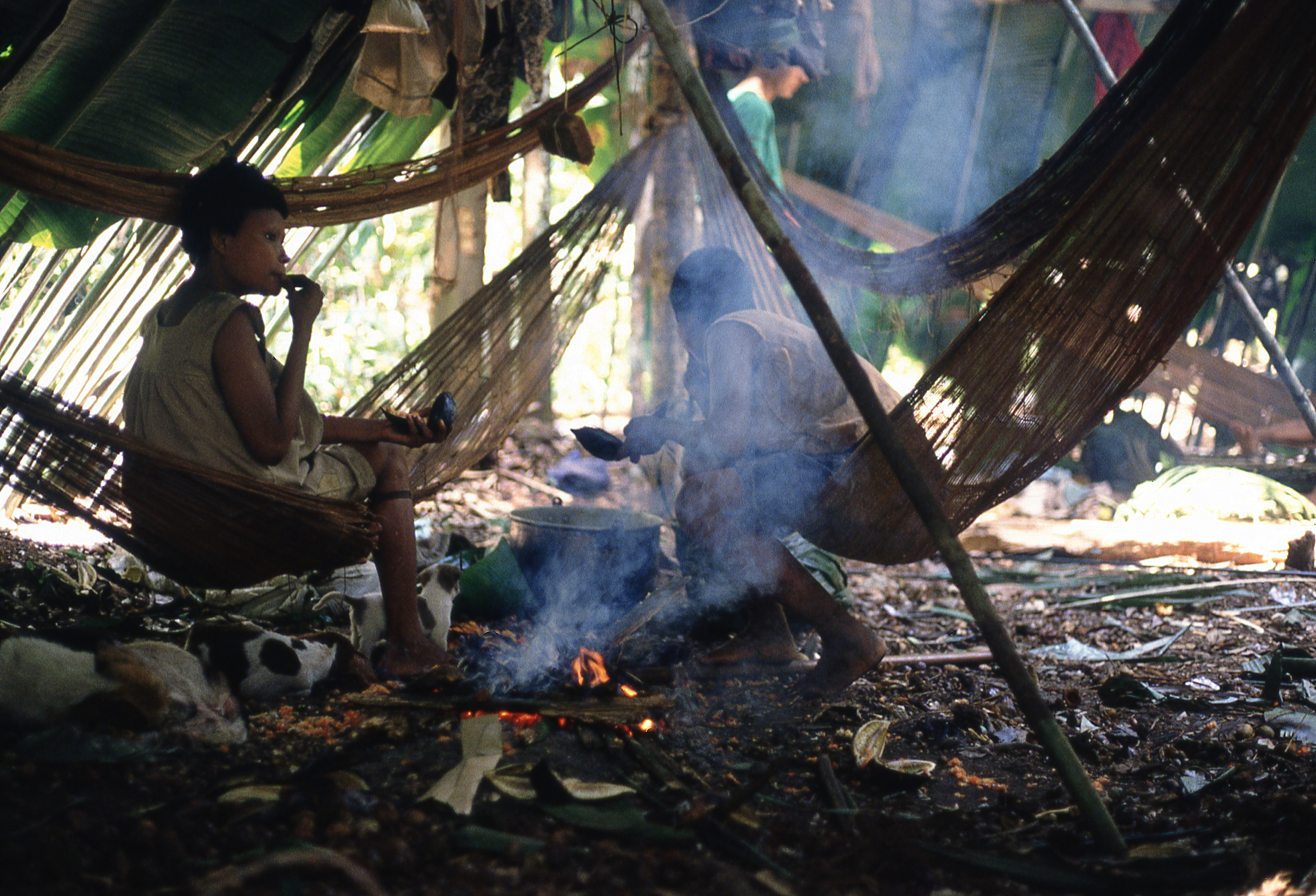
From their hammocks, a couple of young Nukak Makú women eat a local fruit and cook a meal, 2014.

They collect honey of twenty species of bees and many fruits: palm fruits (Jessenia bataua), Oenocarpus spp., Attalea spp., Mauritia sp., Phenakospermum guyannense, Aechmea sp., Inga sp., Couma macrocarpa, Iryanthera sp., Theobroma spp., Pourouma spp., Parinari sp., Micrandra sp., Helicostylis sp., Caryocar sp., Talisia sp., Hymenaea sp., Dacryodes spp., Abuta sp., Eugenia spp., Touraleia sp., Perebea spp., Protium sp., Cecropia sp., Batocarpus sp., Hyeronimasp., Brosimumsp., Dialiumsp., Garciniasp., Manilkarasp., Naucleopsisspp., Pradosiasp., Pouteriasp., Salasiasp., Passifloraspp., Duroia maguirei, Duroia hirsuta, Mouririsp., and Alibertia sp.

Nukak take the sweet resin from "mupabuat" (Lacunal sp.) and the rattan water (Doliocarpus sp.). They cover their encampments ("wopyi") with leaves of Phenakospermum guyannense and palms, and make their hammocks with fiber of the cumare palm Astrocaryum sp.; moorings with Heteropsis tenuispadix, Eschweilera sp., and Anthurium sp.; blowguns with Iriartella stigera, Bactris maraja; bows with Duguetia quitarensis; axe ends with Aspidosperma sp.; darts with thorns of Oneocarpus sp.; dart quivers with leaves of Calathea sp.; milkweed with Pachira nukakika, Ceiba sp., and Pseudobombax sp.; loinclothes for men with Couratari guianensis; baskets with Heteropsis spp.; disposable bags with Ischnosiphon arouma and Heliconia sp.; soap with Cedrelinga sp.; perfumes with Myroxylon sp. and Justice pectoralis; and diverse objects. They make blades with the teeth of piranha but have also adapted to use metals. Until 1990, they practised small-scale pottery, producing a small kind of pot to take with them on their travels and a second, bigger kind, to leave as supplies in their camping sites. Today, they prefer to obtain metallic pots. When they do not have matches or lighters, they use special wood (Pausandra trianae) to produce fire. They no longer make mirrors with the resin of Trattinickia glaziovii nor stone axes.

=== Shifting cultivation ===
They have crops in their territory, along their routes. They traditionally cultivate for food, tubers such as sweet potatoes (Ipomoea batatas), taros (Xanthosoma violaceum, Colocasia sp.), yams (Dioscorea sp.), and manioc (Manihot esculenta). Also peach palms (Bactris gasipaes), pineapple (Ananas comosus), chili pepper (Capsicum chinense), and several fruit trees. In all the gardens there are bananas (Musa paradisiaca) and sugar cane (Saccharum officinarum). They also plant to obtain tools for daily life (like bowls of Crescentia cujete and Lagenaria siceraria); or to make dyes. (like "achiote" Bixa orellana and "carayurú" Arrabidaea chica, in order to paint the body); and a cane (Gynerium sagittatum), to make arrows and harpoons. Tobacco (Nicotiana tabacum) is harvested for ritual uses.

== Society ==
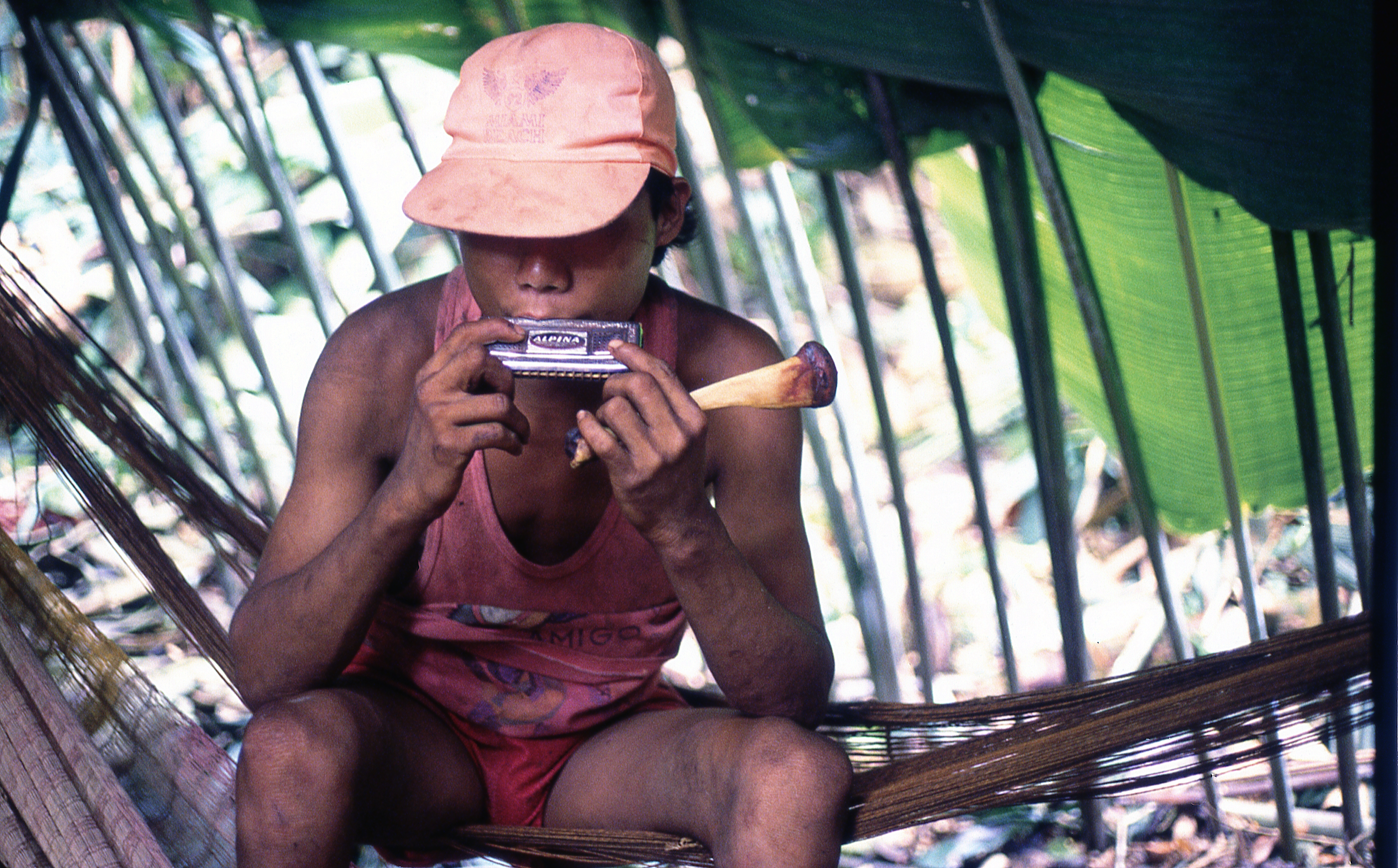
A Nukak Makú man playing the harmonica and holding an animal bone, 2014.

Marriage is settled after the man has formally courted the woman with accepted gifts and she has acceded to live with him. In order to look for a pairing, a man must have gone through an initiation ritual in which he endures trials and consumes a hallucinogen (Virola sp.).

The most suitable couple is one made up by crossed cousins. Marriage between parallel cousins is forbidden. If the woman still lives in the home of the father, the gifts must include him. If the woman accepts, she settles down in the man's encampment; if they have a child then they are considered a formal pair, which establishes mutual relations of kinship, expressed in rights and duties of reciprocity. A man can marry several wives, although a single wife is most common, and examples of three or more are rare. This polygyny coexists with a temporal polyandry during the pregnancy in order to improve the qualities of the baby. Each domestic group is part of a territorial group and other groups that are established to perform specific duties like security measures, according to the different stations and situations. On the other hand, each Núkâk is considered as part of a paternal lineage, "nüwayi", named after an animal or plant.

Ten territorial Nukak groups ("wün") have been identified, each one with at least 50 or 60 people, who most of the year do not remain together but form different groups for harvesting and/or hunting that are distributed in accordance with the climatic seasonal changes and the security situation. Each group is considered part of one of four regions of its territory. On certain occasions different groups join, where they practice a special ritual, "entiwat," in which the groups dance face to face, striking and verbally injuring each other until the ritual reaches a climactic moment in which they all embrace, weeping while they remember their ancestors and express affection. The groups practice a form of exchange, "ihinihat", especially when all the resources are not in the same territory.

It is considered taboo among Nukak to discuss dead people.

== Language ==
Nukak people speak a tonal language. It is very closely related to Kakwa language.

== Endangered status ==
Nukak populations have lowered from malaria, measles and pulmonary diseases since their contact with the New Tribes Mission and other outsiders beginning in 1981. Today, coca growers, left-wing FARC guerillas, right-wing AUC paramilitaries, and the Colombian army have occupied their lands. In 2006, a group of nearly 80 Nukak left the jungle and sought assimilation to preserve their culture. As one of the migrants, Pia-pe, put it: "We do want to join the white family, but we do not want to forget words of the Nukak." In October 2006, leader and Nukak Spanish speaker Maw-be' committed suicide by drinking poison. Friends and the National Indigenous Organization of Colombia (ONIC) reasoned he did so out of desperation in his inability to secure supplies or a safe return for the Nukak to return home.

== Bibliography ==
- FRANKY, Carlos 2011: "Acompañarnos contentos con la familia" Unidad, diferencia y conflicto entre los Nükak. Wageningen University. ISBN 978-90-8585-947-5
- GUALTERO, Israel 1989: "Estudio breve de la cultura material de los Nukak". Asociación Nuevas Tribus de Colombia, mec. 15 p.
- MAHECHA, Dany y Carlos FRANKY 2013: "Recolectando en el Cielo: elementos del manejo Nɨkak del mundo"; Patience Epps & Kristine Stenzel (eds.) Upper Rio Negro: cultural and linguistic interaction in Northwestern Amazonia, p.p. 163-193. Rio de Janeiro: Museu do Índio - Funai. ISBN 978-85-85986-45-2
- POLITIS, Gustavo 1995: Mundo Nukak. Fondo de Promoción de Cultura. Bogotá D.C:Banco Popular.-ISBN 958-9003-81-8
- POLITIS, Gustavo 2007: Nukak: Ethnoarchaeology of an Amazonian People. (Benjamin ALBERTI, trans.) Left Cast Press and University College London Institute of Archaeology Publications, Walnut Creek, CA. ISBN 9781598742305
