= Hup language =

Naduhup-family language of the Hupda people in Colombia and Brazil

Hup
- Hupdë
- Pronunciation: [húpʔɨ̌d]
- Native to: Brazil
- Ethnicity: Hupd'ëh, Yohup
- Native speakers: 1,700 (2006–2007)
- Language family: Nadahup: Hup

Language codes
- ISO 639-3: Either: jup – Hup yab – Yuhup
- Glottolog: hupy1235
- ELP: Hupda
- Yuhup
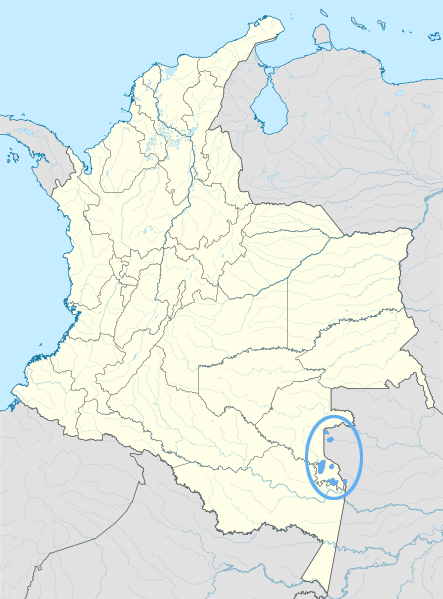

The Hup language (also called Hupdë, Hupdá, Hupdé, Hupdá Makú, Jupdá, Makú, Makú-Hupdá, Makú De, Hupda, and Jupde) is one of the four Nadahup languages. It is spoken by the Hupda indigenous Amazonian peoples who live on the border between Colombia and the Brazilian state of Amazonas. There are approximately 1500 speakers of the Hup language. As of 2005, according to the American linguist Patience Epps, Hup is not seriously endangered since, although the actual number of speakers is few, all Hupda children learn Hup as their first language.

== History ==
Although their territory was the target of forced transferrals throughout the 17th and 18th centuries, due to their isolation, the Naduhup were among the least affected, since they were protected by the geography of their land. They were also the target of several Catholic missions, though those ultimately failed, as the Naduhup refused to send their children to Catholic education centres.

Contact with the Tucanoan people, also known as the River Indians, who live along the rivers rather than in the forests, has significantly impacted the Naduhup, both culturally and linguistically. Since before European contact, the Naduhup and Tukanoan peoples have engaged in trade, the Naduhup providing labour and hunted meats and the Tucanoan providing agricultural goods. However, the Naduhup are viewed as inferior by the Tucanoan, because of their linguistic and lifestyle differences. Because of this inequality, most Naduhup people can understand and/or speak a Tucanoan, while it is the opposite vice versa – very few, if any Tucanoan people speak Hup.

== Language profile ==
Relatively few linguistic materials of Hup are available, due to the isolation of the Hupda. Incomplete vocabulary lists and dictionaries were established in 1955 (Giacone) and 1993 (Erickson and Erickson). The most complete descriptive grammar of Hup, A Grammar of Hup, was written by Patience Epps in 2005, was updated in 2008, and outlines Hup phonology, parts of speech, morphology, aspect, tense, modality, among many other features.

Hup is one of four languages in the Naduhup (Makú) family. Though Makú is the term most commonly used to refer to this language family, there is controversy over its usage, since it is also an ethnic slur, translating to “without language”, used by the Tukanoan towards the Naduhup. There has not been a consensus on a replacement term, although Epps proposed “Naduhup”, which combines the names of the four members of the language family - Nadëb, Dâw, Hup, and Yuhup. Of the four members of the language family, Hup is most closely related to Yuhup, followed by Dâw, and then lastly by Nadëb. Hup and Yuhup are nearly mutually intelligible, sharing more than 90% of their basic vocabularies.

== Phonology ==
=== Consonants ===
Hup consonants
			Bilabial	Alveolar	Palatal	Velar	Glottal
Occlusive	plain	voiceless	p	t	c	k	
Occlusive	plain	voiced	b	d	ɟ	g	
Occlusive	glottalic	voiceless	(pˀ)				ʔ
Occlusive	glottalic	voiced	bˀ	dˀ	ɟˀ	gˀ	
Fricative					ç		h
Approximant	plain		w		j		
Approximant	glottalic		wˀ		jˀ		

- /ç ɟ g/ appear only morpheme-finally; all other consonants may appear in initial, medial, and final positions.
- Glottalization /Cˀ/ is realized as laryngealization of the following vowel [CV̰] or as non-release when morpheme-final [C̚].
- /pˀ/ occurs only in the word pʼǎy [pǎ̰j] 'priest' and only in certain dialect areas.
- /w/ is realized as [β] before /æ e i/ and [w] elsewhere.
- /c/ in onset position is usually realized as [tʃ ʃ] in free variation; less frequent allophones are [ts s c].
- The plosive allophones of /c ɟ ɟˀ/ are coronal [t̠ʲ d̠ʲ], not dorsal [k̟ʲ g̟ʲ].
- /t d/ may be realized as [ɾ] between vowels.

==== Allophony ====
Phoneme	Initial	Final	Nasal
b	ᵐb	bᵐ	m
d	ⁿd	dⁿ	n
ɟ		ɟᶮ	ɲ
g		gᵑ	ŋ

Phoneme	Initial	Final	Nasal
bˀ	ᵐbV̰	p̚	mp̚
dˀ	ⁿdV̰	t̚	nt̚
ɟˀ	tʃV̰	c̚	j̃c̚
gˀ	kV̰	k̚	ŋ̚

=== Vowels ===
Hup contains a large segmental phonemic inventory, in comparison to the Tukanoan languages that neighbour it geographically. Hup vowels are composed of nine contrasting sounds, with no occurring diphthongs:

Hup vowels
	Front	Central	Back
Close	i	ɨ	u
Mid	e	ə	o
Open	æ	a	ɔ

However, these nine sounds occur only in non-nasal contexts. In nasal morphemes, there are only six distinct vowels:

	Front	Central	Back
Close	ĩ	ɨ̃	ũ
Open	æ̃	ã	ɔ̃

According to Epps (2008), this indicates that the contrast between mid and close/open vowels is neutralised in nasal contexts. Nasalisation is morphemic at the syllable level and targets all segments – generally, every syllable is either fully nasal or fully oral.

=== Tonality ===
Hup tonality functions in what is called a word-accent system – there is a word-level tone contrast system; the contrast is restricted to one syllable per word, which is predictable and also exhibits other features of stressed syllables (greater intensity, longer duration, and higher pitch). There are two tones: rising and high, which only appear in nouns and adjectives.

Hup tones
Rising	/cǎʔ/ [cǎʔ] "clump of roots"
High	/cáʔ/ [cáʔ] "box, nest"

== Morphology ==
Nouns and verbs are open class, while adjectives are closed class. Nouns usually appear as arguments of clauses and can appear bare in the clause, while verbs must be inflected in some way. Hup is highly agglutinative and concatenative, with a high rate of synthesis and low rate of phonological fusion of morphemes. Therefore, its morphemes are easily segmented. Roots typically undergo compounding, while formatives are affixed or cliticised.

=== Personal pronouns ===
	Subject	Object	Oblique	Possessive	
				Downriver Hup dialects	Umari Norte dialect
1sg	ʔɑ̃h́	ʔɑ́n	ʔɑ̃h́-ɑ̃t́	nɨ̌	nɨ̌h
2sg	ʔɑ́m	ʔɑ́m-ɑ́n	ʔɑ́m-ɑ́t	ʔɑ́mɨ̌h	ʔɑ́m-nɨ̌h
3sg	tɨ́h	tɨ́h-ɑ́n	tɨ́h-ɨ́t	tɨnɨ̌h	tɨh-nɨ̌h
1pl	ʔɨ́n	ʔɨ́n-ɑ́n	ʔɨ́n-ɨ́t	ʔɨnɨ̌h	ʔɨn-nɨ̌h
2pl	nɨ́ŋ	nɨ́ŋ-ɑ́n	nɨ́ŋ-ɨ́t	nɨŋɨ̌h	nɨŋ-nɨ̌h
3pl	hɨ́d	hɨ́d-ɑ́n hɨɾan (TD)	hɨ́d-ɨ́t [hɨɾɨt] (TD)	hɨdnɨ̌h hɨdɨ̌h [hɨɾɨh] (TD) yɨʔd’ə̌h-nɨ̌h	hɨd-nɨ̌h

=== Demonstrative and Interrogative Pronouns ===
Inflection	Demonstratives (forms and meanings)				Interrogative
uninflected	nu- / nɨ- Proximal	n'i- Distal	yu- / yɨ- Intangible	cã- 'other'	hɨ̃ Interrogative
-p (from Dependent)	núp 'this'	n'íp 'that'	yúp 'that'	cãp 'another'	hɨ̃p 'which?'
-t (from Oblique)	nút 'here'	n'ít 'there'	yɨ́t 'thus, then'	-	hɨ̃t 'where?'
-ǎn Object	nú-uw-ǎn 'this-(FLR)-OBJ'	n'í-iw-ǎn 'that-(FLR)-OBJ'	yú-uw-ǎn 'that-(FLR)-OBJ'	cã-ãw-ǎn 'another-(FLR)-OBJ'	hɨ̃w-ǎn 'which one?'
-V´t Oblique	nú-uw-ṹt 'this-(FLR)-OBL'	n'í-ĩw-ĩt 'that-(FLR)-OBL'	yú-uw-út 'that-(FLR)-OBL'	cã-ãw-ãt 'another-(FLR)-OBL'	hɨ̃w-ɨ̃t 'with which one?'
-Vp Dependent	nú-ũw-ṹp 'this-(FLR)-DEP'	n'i-ĩw-ĩp 'that-(FLR)-DEP'	yú-uw-úp 'that-(FLR)-DEP'	cã-ãw-ãp 'another-(FLR)-DEP'	hɨ̃p 'which; how, in what manner?'
-V´h Declarative	nú-ũw-ṹh 'this-(FLR)-DECL'	n'i-ĩw-ĩh 'that-(FLR)-DECL'	yú-uw-úh 'that-(FLR)-DECL	cã-ãw-ãh 'another-(FLR)-DECL'	-
-Vʔ Interrogative	núw-ũʔ -	n'íw-ĩʔ -	yúw-uʔ -	cãw-ãʔ -	-
-cóʔ Locative	nú-cóʔ 'in this place here'	n'í-cóʔ 'in that place there'	yɨ́-cóʔ 'over there'	cã-ʔah-cóʔ 'in another place'	hɨ̃-cóʔ 'at/ to what location?
-d'əh Plural/ collective	nɨ-d'əh 'these'	n'í-d'əh 'those'	yɨ́--d'əh 'those, they'	cã-d'əh 'others'	-
n'ɨ́h; Nominalizer	nɨ-n'ɨ́h 'these, this, about here'	n'í-n'ɨ́h 'those, about there'	yɨ́-n'ɨ́h 'those, thus'	cã-- n'ɨ́h 'whatever'	hɨ̃- n'ɨ́h 'what, what kind?'
-ʔap Quantity,number	náʔap 'this many'	n'ip-ʔap 'that many'	yɨ́-ʔap / yáʔap 'this many, all that'	-	hɨ̃-ʔap 'how many?'

=== Semiverbal nouns ===
Some nouns of Hup are semiverbal, namely those which have to do with the passage of time, as well as periods of time, which are “inherently progressive and impermanent.”

“Passage of time” words:

- wəhə́d "old man"
- wɑ́ "old woman"
- dóʔ "child"

“Periods of time” words:

- wɑ́g "day"
- j'ə́b "night"

While these words belong to the noun class (they typically appear as arguments of a clause, and aspectual inflection is not required), they have verb-like qualities, such as occurrence in verbal compounds (which is normally restricted to only verbs):

mɔ̌h tɨh yæ̃ʔ-wɑd-hi-wɑ́g-ɑ́h
inambu 3sg roast-eat-FACT-day-DECL
"He cooked and ate inambu until daybreak."

=== Respect markers ===
The enclitic =wəd, derived from the word for “old man” wəhə́d, can be inserted as a respect marker when referring to spiritual beings or other humans. The feminine form of this is =wa.

yunícu=wəd-ǎn ʔãh ʔɨ́d-ɨh
Junilson=RESP-OBJ 1sg speak-DECL
"I spoke to respected Junilson."

This marker is usually used to refer to someone older or of higher status, though it can also be used to indicate someone to be feared, especially when used to refer to dangerous spirits.

yúp tɨ̃hɨ̃́y=wəd nɨ̌h tóg-óh!
that.ITG snake=RESP POSS daughter-DECL
"It was the old/respected Snake’s daughter! (from the Rainbow Spirit and the Snake of the Hollow-Star story)."

The usage of =wəd is also not necessarily respectful. The enclitic can also be affixed to children's names as a sign of affection, comparable to doing the same in English with the titles “Mister” or “Miss”.

=== Negation ===
Negation is complex in Hup, as three separate strategies can be used to express negation in the language. The most common form of indicating negation is through the negator suffix [-nɨ́h] on verbal or adjectival predicates (and not nominal predicates, which are negated with the identity negation article). Secondly, predicative particle [pã̌] can be used with noun phrases to express specifically the negation of the existence of a referent. Lastly, the article [ʔǎp] expresses negation against an entity within a clause or the against entire clause itself, where the most common use of this particle is as an identity negator with nominal predicates.

maŋgǎ hɨ́d-ǎn təw-nɨ́h
margarita 3PL-OBJ scold-NEG
‘Margarita didn't yell at them.’

g'ɨ-nɨ́h=hɔ̃ yúw-úh
hot-NEG=NONVIS that-DECL
‘It's not hot.’

[tiyɨʔ pǒg] pã̌
man big NEG.EX
‘There is no big man.’

nutæ̌n-æ̃́y ʔɨd ʔǎp
today-DYNM story NEG.ID
‘(It's) not a story of today.’

Negative responses to questions or refusals to offers in Hup require one of the strategies above; there is no general lexeme/morpheme for 'no' in Hup.

== Syntax ==
=== Basic syntactic word order ===
The most frequent and grammatically simplest word order in Hup is Subject (Agent), Object, Verb (SOV). Epps notes that the agent, the actor/argument of a transitive sentence, precedes the object and verb in the syntactic structure of Hup.

tiyǐʔ cadakǎʔ-ǎn pɨhɨtyúm nɔ́ʔ-ɔ̃́y
man chicken-OBJ corn give-DYNM
‘The man gives corn to the chicken.’

nùp hɔ̴̴̌p-ǎn ʔɨn wæd-té-h
this fish-OBJ 1PL eat-FUT-DECL
‘We'll eat this fish.’

The verb-final construction of clauses in Hup, as seen above, is best characterized as AOV (agent, object, verb).

=== Case and agreement ===
Hup is nominative-accusative. All subjects are unmarked, while the object and other noun cases are suffixed. Which suffix is used can depend on number, animacy, type of noun, and grammatical function, as shown in the table below. Case marking extends also to the noun phrase and relative clause, and the suffixes attach to the final constituent of the phrase.

Grammatical function	Nouns	Nouns marked for number	Pronouns, demonstratives
S, A	-ø	-ø	-ø
O (Direct object)	Human: -ɑ̌n, Animal: -ɑ̌n (optional), Inanimate: -ø	-ɑ̌n (Plural: -n’ɑ̌n)	-ɑ̌n
O (beneficiary, recipient of ditransitive verbs)	-ɑ̌n	-ɑ̌n (Plural: -n’ɑ̌n)	-ɑ̌n
Directional oblique	-an		
Oblique	-V́t	-V́t	-V́t

{tɨh=tæ̃h ʔín-ɑ̌n=mɑh} tɨh mǽh-ǽh
3sg=child,mother-OBJ=REP 3sg hit-DECL
"He beat his wife, it’s said."

nǽm ʔɑ́m-ɑ̌n ʔɑ̃h key-nɨ̌ŋ
louse 2sg-OBJ 1sg see-COOP
"I’ll look for lice for you."

hɔ̃p=n'ɑn tɨh w'ób-óh
fish=PL.OBJ 3sg place-DECL
"She placed the fish (on the smoking platform)."

yɑ́g-ɑn g'ɑ̃ʔ-ʔɑ́y hɑ́m
hammock-DIR suspend-VENT.IMP go.IMP
"Go lie in the hammock!"

tiyǐʔ(-ɑ̌n) (tɨh=)pǒg-ɑ̌n túk-úy=mɑh
man(-OBJ) (3sg=)big-OBJ want-DYNM=REP
"She wants the big man, it’s said."

Though the object case and directional oblique markers are almost identical phonologically, the only difference being the stress, directional oblique is mainly used to indicate direction, and sometimes, location, in which it coincides with oblique case.

=== Syntactically Bound Nouns ===
In Hup, there is a class of nouns that must occur with a modifier. These nouns may have many different meanings, but generally all of the members of kin terms, human nouns, plant parts, and animal body parts are considered these 'bound' nouns. These bound nouns are also often closely related to the phenomenon of inalienable possession, but not necessarily. Outside of the aforementioned semantic sets of typically 'bound' nouns; other examples of bound nouns are "eggs, jars and other hollow items, holes belonging to insects, rivers, and a generic term for swarming insects."

=== Syntactic Constructions and Modification ===
Modification is a semantic operation and syntactic construction by which referents in a language can be modified. There are three types of modifier constructions, each of which are present in Hup: subcategorizing modification, selecting modification, and situating modification.

==== Property Concept Modification ====
Subcategorizing modification includes property concept modification. In Hup, property concept modification is constructed using a juxtaposition strategy (zero strategy). As noted by Epps, adjectives (property concepts in a modifying relationship with a referent) follow the nouns they modify, which is in contrast to other types of noun phrases containing a modifier like numerals, demonstratives, and compounded nouns, which precede the noun.

tɨh wɔn-hám-ay-áh té tod pǒg g'et-pó-ow-ít=mah
3SG follow-go-INCH-DECL until hollow.tree big stand-EMPH1-FLR-OBL=REP
‘She went after (the spirit), to where a big hollow tree stood, they say.'

==== Numeral Modification ====
Selecting modification includes numeral concept modification. In Hup, numeral modification is constructed using a juxtaposition strategy (zero strategy). Epps notes that numerals can occur both as nominal modifiers and as nominal heads in a noun phrase, and that as modifiers, they typically precede the noun using a juxtaposition strategy.

ʔɨn wɨd-ham-bɨ́-ay-áh... j'ák b'ɔk kə́d-ə́h, koʔap b'ɔ̌k
1PL arrive-go-HAB-INCH-DECL buriti swamp pass-DECL two swamp
‘We arrived as we always do... we passed the buriti-swamps, two swamps’

==== Object Modification ====
In Hup, object modification is constructed using a relational or flag strategy. An adposition marks a modifying relationship between an object concept and referent. According to Epps, expression of possession in Hup--a type of object modification relationship--involves the conjunction of two nouns and the postpositional particle [nɨ̌h], which indicates inalienable possession.

pedú nɨ̌h cug'æ̌t
Pedro POSS book
‘Pedro's book’

==== Deictic Modification ====
Situating modification includes deictic modification. In Hup, deictic modification, including the modifying relationship of demonstratives with a referent, is constructed using a juxtaposition strategy (zero strategy). In Hup, deictic modifiers and demonstratives precede the referent noun in a noun phrase.

núp təg ʔán péʔ-éy=hɔ̃
this tooth 1SG.OBJ hurt-DYNM=NONVIS
‘This tooth hurts (lit. 'hurts me')’

=== Complex Coordinative Construction ===
==== Conjunctive Construction ====
Hup can construct complex coordinative sentences, which are sentences containing two clauses, typically grammatically symmetrical, and is achieved through coordination strategies. While various coordinative constructions exist in Hup, including conjunctive (additive coordination like English 'and'), disjunctive (alternative coordination like English 'or'), and adversative (contrastive coordination like English 'but'), the conjunctive coordinative construction is the most common complex coordinative construction in Hup.

Conjunctive relationships between two clauses in Hup are typically translated with 'and' in English. In other words, glossing of Hup will use the English term 'and' in the translation line for both clausal and phrasal coordination.

nút tɨ́h-ǎn d'oʔ-cæŋpe-g'et-yɨ́ʔ-ɨ́y=mah tɨ́h-ǎn tɨ́h yók-óh
here 3SG-OBJ take-astraddle-stand-TEL-DYNM=REP 3SG-OBJ 3SG poke-DECL
‘(He) made him stand with his legs apart like this, (and) he poked him.’

núp tɨ́h kəmən-g'ét-ay-áh tɨ́h-ǎn dɔw̌h n'æm'-g'ét-éy=cud tɨnɨ̌h yãʔambǒʔ-óh
this 3SG wrap.arms.around-stand-INCH-DECL 3SG-OBJ check lick-stand-DYNM=INFR 3SG.POSS dog-DECL
‘He's standing like this with his arms around (the dog), and (it) is licking his cheek, the dog!’

The most common strategy in Hup for both phrasal and clausal coordination is the simple juxtaposition of the coordinated elements, or ‘zero strategy’. As seen in the examples above, the clauses are conjoined through juxtaposition, and in other words there is no overt marker(s) indicating coordination of the clauses. Conjunctive clausal coordination in Hup typically requires a juxtaposition strategy or zero-marked asyndetic strategy. In short, conjunctive clausal coordination in Hup uses no binder or coordinator in between coordinands, and clauses are juxtaposed together.

Additionally, this construction in Hup utilizes a de-ranking strategy. The majority of Hup’s clause-linking strategies involve a combination of a main clause and a dependent clause; the dependent-clause verb lacks inflection for tense-aspect-mode, and therefore the two clauses are imbalanced as the dependent clause is de-ranked. For example, the gloss from p. 805 depicts a main clause with telic aspect marking, while the dependent clause is not fully inflected with the telic aspect marking.

==== Phrasal Coordination ====
Like clausal coordination, the most common strategy in Hup for phrasal coordination is the simple juxtaposition of the coordinated elements, or ‘zero strategy’. No morphological indicator is required for the coordination of noun phrases in Hup.

nihṹʔ b'ɔ̌ʔ=tat naháw=tat núp g'ǒp=tat hɨd d'oʔ-pɨ́d-ɨ́h
all gourd=fruit macucu=fruit this tucuma=fruit 3PL take-DIST-DECL
‘They took all kinds: gourds, macucú fruits, (and) these tucumá fruits.'

== Semantics ==
=== Plurals ===
The plurality marker for nouns is =d'əh and follows an animacy hierarchy: humans, animals, and inanimates. For humans, plural marking is obligatory, though exception is made for a non-specific referent.

tiyǐʔ=d'əh-əwə́c ʔəg-nɑ́ʔ-ɑ́y
man=PL-FLR-EXCL2 drink-lose.senses-DYNM
"Only the men got drunk!"

hup də̌b hɨd bɨ́ʔ-ɨ́h
person many 3pl work-DECL
"Lots of people worked."

However, the marker is present for groups of people, which are considered conceptually plural.

nutæ̌n-ɑy teghɔ̃́=d'əh nɨ̌h yɑ́g-ɑy nutæ̌n-ǽp
today-INCH Non-Indian=PL POSS hammock-INCH today-DEP
"Nowadays we use the hammocks of the Non-Indians, these days."

Animals are generally also marked for plurality, but differ in that the marker is not obligatory for groups of animals. As with humans, non-specific referents are also not marked.

núp nutæ̌n yɑʔɑ́m=d'əh hɨd wæd-nɨ́h-ɑy-ɑ́h
this today jaguar=PL 3pl eat-NEG-INCH-DECL
"So today jaguars don’t eat (people)."

hɔ̃̌p(*=d'əh) ʔɑ̃́h kək-d'oʔ-nɨ́h
fish(*=PL) 1sg pull-take-NEG
"I didn't catch any fish."

hɔ̃̌p=d'əh pɑ̃̌
fish=PL NEG:EX
"The (specific) fish are not here."

Inanimate objects are not marked for plurality and rely on numerals to indicate such. Plural inanimate entities are regarded with low importance, due to usually having low conceptual salience, and therefore are also almost always unmarked for number in discourse as well.

dadɑ́nya tɨ́h-ɑ̌n {ʔɑ̃h nɔ́ʔ-b'ɑy-ɑ́h}
orange 3sg-OBJ give-AGAIN-DECL
"I gave her the oranges (that I’d brought)."

=== Numerals ===
Numerals in Hup are fairly etymologically unambiguous, which is very rare cross-linguistically. For the cardinal numerals 1-5, the forms likely derive from grammaticalized phrases, referring to the quantity of various salient phenomena for Hup people, with some variation between dialects. These dialectal variants will be labeled further as TD (Tat Deh), B (Barreira), UN (Umari Norte), and NF (Nova Fundação).The quantifier morpheme (-ʔǎp) is already integrated into the numerals '2' and '3' and may be used for the numerals 4+ but is not mandatory. For the cardinal numerals 6-20, there is much more variation, and their forms have not been lexicalized to the extent of numerals 1-5. Furthermore, through lexical borrowing, "virtually all speakers prefer Portuguese numerals for 6+," and for numerals 20+, Portuguese forms are exclusively used.

	Numeral	Likely Etymology
1	ʔayǔp (TD, B) ʔǽp (UN)	compare with demonstrative 'yúp' - 'that' (intangible)
2	koʔǎp (B) kaʔǎp (TD, UN) kəwěg-ʔǎp (NF?)	'eye-quantity'
3	mɔ́twaʔǎp (B) mɔ́ɾaʔǎp (TD) mɔ́t-wɨg-ʔǎp (NF?) bab' pẵ (UN)	'rubber.tree-seed-quantity' 'sibling NEG.EX' (UN)
4	hi-bab'-nǐ (TD, B) bab'-nǐ (TD, UN)	'(FACT)-have_sibling/accompany.NMZ'
5	ʔayup dapṹh (TD, B) ʔædapṹh (TD) nap'ṹh (variant B) ʔæp d'apṹh (UN)	'one hand'

== Abbreviations ==
Abbreviation	Meaning
AGAIN	repetitive aspect/topic-shift
COOP	cooperative
DECL	declarative
DEP	dependent marker/topic marker
DIR	directional oblique
DYNM	dynamic
EXCL	exclusive
EXCL2	exclusive (dialectical variant)
FACT	factitive
FLR	following marker
IMP	imperative
INCH	inchoative
ITG	intangible
NEG	negative (verbal)
NEG.EX	negative existence
NEG.ID	negative identity
NMZ	nominalizer
OBJ	object
PL	plural/collective
POSS	possessive
REP	reportive evidential
RESP	respect marker
VENT	ventive
EMPH1	emphatic (1st person)
REP	repetitive aspect
NONVIS	nonvisual experiential

== Bibliography ==
- Epps, Patience (2008a). A Grammar of Hup. Berlin: Mouton de Gruyter. doi:10.1515/9783110199079. ISBN 9783110195880. OCLC 213466163. OL 16680004M.
- Epps, Patience (2008b). "Grammatical borrowing in Hup". In Matras, Yaron; Sakel, Jeanette (eds.). Grammatical Borrowing in Cross-Linguistic Perspective. Berlin: Mouton de Gruyter.
- Epps, Patience (2009). "Loanwords in Hup, a Nadahup language of Amazonia". In Haspelmath, Martin; Tadmor, Uri (eds.). Loanwords in the World's Languages: A Comparative Handbook. Berlin: Mouton de Gruyter. pp. 992–1012.
- Epps, Patience (2011). "Reciprocal constructions in Hup". In Evans, Nicholas (ed.). Reciprocals and Semantic Typology. Amsterdam: John Benjamins. pp. 315–327.
- Erickson, Timothy; Erickson, Catherine (1993). Vocabulario Jupda-Español-Português. Summer Institute of Linguistics.
- Moore, Barbara J.; Franklin, Gail L. (1979). Breves notícias da língua Maku-Hupda (PDF). Summer Institute of Linguistics. OCLC 7812722.
