= Puinave language =

Indigenous language of Colombia and Venezuela

Puinavé
- Wãnsöhöt, Wã́nsöjöt
- Pronunciation: [ˈw̃ã́nsɤhɤt]
- Native to: Colombia, Venezuela
- Ethnicity: 7,000 (ca. 2007)
- Native speakers: (3,000 cited 2001–2008)
- Language family: Language isolate
- Dialects: Puinave; "Macú"

Language codes
- ISO 639-3: pui
- Glottolog: puin1248
- ELP: Puinave
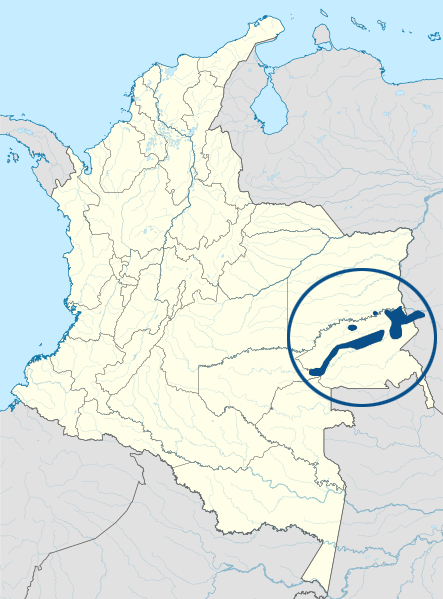

Puinave, also known as Waipunavi (Guaipunabi) or Wanse (Wã́nsöjöt [ˈw̃ã́nsɤhɤt]; Puinave: Wãnsöhöt) is an indigenous language of Colombia and Venezuela. It is generally considered to be a language isolate.

== Demographics ==
There are about 6,800 people in 32 communities along the banks of the Inírida River in Guainía Department, Colombia. Additionally, there are 470 people in 10 communities along the Orinoco River, in the Colombia–Venezuela border region.

Other names for the language include Camaku del Guaviare or Camaku del Inírida.

== Varieties ==
Varieties listed by Mason (1950):

- Puinave
  - Puinave (Epined)
    - Western: Bravos, Guaripa
    - Eastern: Mansos
  - "Macú"
    - "Macú"
    - Tikié
    - Kerarí
    - Papurí
    - Nadöbo

Alternate names of Puinave are Puinabe, Puinavis, Uaipunabis, Guaipunavos, Uaipis.

== Classification ==
Puinave is sometimes linked to other poorly attested languages of the region in various Macro-Puinavean proposals, but no good evidence has ever been produced. The original motivation seems to simply be that all of these languages were called Maku ('babble') by Arawakans. Ongoing work on Puinave by Girón Higuita at the University of Amsterdam will hopefully clarify the situation.

== Phonology ==
=== Consonants ===
| | | Labial | Coronal | Dorsal | Glottal |
|---|---|---|---|---|---|
| Plosive | Oral | p | t | k | ʔ |
| Plosive | Nasal | m | n | | |
| Fricative | | | s | | h |
| Glide | | (w) | | (j) | |

=== Vowels ===
| | Front | Back unround. | Back round. |
|---|---|---|---|
| Close | i ĩ | ɯ | u |
| Mid | e | ɤ ɤ̃ | o õ |
| Open | | a ã | |

Syllable structure is (C)V(C); nasal syllabic nuclei cause allophonic variation of consonantal segments in the same syllable. The phonemes /m n/ have oral, non-sonorant allophones [b d] in the onsets of syllables with oral nuclei.

The high vowel [u], when occurring in onset or coda position, is realized as a glide [w]. When the high vowel /i/ is in coda position, it is also realized as a glide [j], but in onset position, it is realized as a palatal stop matching in nasality with the nucleus, either [ɟ] or [ɲ], in the same way that /m n/ match the following vowel's nasality. Any glides [w] occurring before or [j w] occurring after a nasalized nucleus are also realized as nasal [j̃ w̃].

=== Tone ===
Puinave distinguishes four surface (phonetic) tones: two simple (H and L) and two contour (HL and LH); these are analyzed as being composed of two phonemic tone values, H and L. Girón Higuita and Wetzels (2007) note that speakers seem to associate H with prominence, rather than increased duration or intensity (the typical correlates of prominence in languages like English).

== Morphology and syntax ==
Jesús Mario Girón's description of the morphology and the function of nominalized constructions in this language can be found in The Linguistics of Endangered Languages (edited by Leo Wetzels).

== Bibliography ==
- Bautista Sánchez, E. (2008). Diccionario puinave-español y la oración gramatical. CIRCUI, Centro de Investigaciones de rescate cultural Puinave Autóctonas.
- Girón, J. M. (2008). Una gramática del Wã́nsöjöt (Puinave). Amsterdam: Vrije Universiteit. (Doctoral dissertation).
- Girón Higuita, J.M. and W. Leo Wetzels (2007). Tone in Wãnsöhöt (Puinave). Language Endangerment and Endangered Languages: Linguistic and Anthropological Studies with Special Emphasis on the Languages and Cultures of the Andean-Amazonian Border Area, W. Leo Wetzels ed., CNWS Publications.
