= Dâw language =

Nadahup language spoken in Brazil

Dâw
- Kuri-Dou
- Native to: Brazil
- Region: Amazonas
- Ethnicity: Dâw people
- Native speakers: 160 (2026)
- Language family: Nadahup: Dâw
- Dialects: Kurikuriaí (Kurikuriari)

Language codes
- ISO 639-3: kwa
- Glottolog: daww1239
- ELP: Dâw

Dâw is a Nadahup language spoken by about one hundred Dâw people in the northwestern part of Amazonas, Brazil, in an area commonly known as Alto Rio Negro. Most Dâw also speak Nheengatu and Portuguese.

An extinct variety, Kurikuria(r)í, named after the Curicuriari River, was a distinct language sociolinguistically, but at least partially intelligible with Dâw.

== Phonology ==
=== Vowels ===
Dâw has 15 vowels:

	Front	Back	
	Unrounded	Unrounded	Rounded
Close	i, ĩ	ɯ, ɯ̃	u, ũ
Close-mid	e	ɤ	o
Open-mid	ɛ, ɛ̃		ɔ, ɔ̃
Open	a, ã		

Vowels are laryngealized when occurring beside a glottal stop, as seen in the examples below.

/ʔɛʔ/ [ʔɛ̰́ʔ] "large mouth"
/nɯʔ/ [nɯ̰́ʔ] "to lack"

==== Vowel harmony ====
Vowel harmony in Dâw is seen primarily in two situations: in compounding and with the focus marker /-Vʔ/, where V indicates a vowel. When combining two words with the first word having the syllable structure CVC, vowel harmony is not seen, e.g. /pɔx/ "high" + /lã̌ʃ/ "boat" = /pɔxlã̌ʃ/ "airplane". However, when combining two words with the first word having the syllable structure CV, vowel harmony is seen, e.g. /xɔ̂/ "canoe" + /tɯm/ "eye" = /xɯtɯm/ "sun". The vowel of the focus marker /-Vʔ/ is the same as the vowel of the syllable it is appended to, e.g. /jɯ̂w/ "blood" + /-Vʔ/ = /jɯ̂wɯʔ/.

=== Consonants ===
Dâw has 25 consonants:

		Bilabial	Alveolar	Palatal	Velar	Glottal
Plosive	Sorda	p	t	c	k	ʔ
Plosive	Sonora	b	d	ɟ	ɡ	
Fricative				ʃ	x	h
Nasal	Plain	m	n	ɲ	ŋ	
Nasal	Glottalized	mˀ	nˀ	ɲˀ		
Approximant	Plain		l	j	w	
Approximant	Glottalized		lˀ	jˀ	wˀ	

Glottalized consonants are also laryngealized, as seen in the examples below.

/wˀac/ [w̰ˀác̚] "oar"
/ʃělˀ/ [ʃěːl̰ˀ̚] "banana"

The plosive consonants have no audible release as codas, e.g. /pɤp/ "to kick" is realized as [pɤp̚], and /kɤɟ/ "to scratch with the nail" as [kʼɤc̚]. As onsets, /c/ and /k/ are realized as ejective consonants, i.e. [cʼ] and [kʼ], unlike the other plosive consonants, which are realized simply as plain consonants, e.g. [cʼóc̚] "without hair", [kʼɛ̃́k̚] "to hook".

=== Stress ===
Stress is fixed in Dâw, occurring on the last syllable of a word. A few suffixes in Dâw do not take the stress, however. The suffixes are divided into two groups, metric suffixes and extrametric suffixes. The former follows the general rule of stress on the last syllable, while the latter does not. See the examples below, where /-ɔh/ is a metric suffix, and /-ĩh/ an extrametric suffix.

[bɤ̀ˈjɤ̂ː] "to return"
[bɤ̀jɤ̂ːˈɔ́h] "return!"
[bɤ̀ˈjɤ̂ːĩ̀h] "is returning"

=== Tone ===
In Dâw there are either three or four tones, depending on analysis. There are a low tone, a high tone, a rising tone and a falling tone, marked by a grave accent, an acute accent, a caron and circumflex, respectively, but only the two latter are lexical. The low tone only occurs on syllables without stress, while the high tone only occurs on syllables with stress, and the rising and falling tones may occur on all syllables. As the low and high tones are not lexical, they are often left unmarked, as in /tɤɡ/ "tooth", which really is realized as [tɤ́ɡ̚].

Besides the lexical function of tone, tone may also function morphologically and syntactically. Consider the examples below, the first being morphological and the second being syntactical, showing how tone is used in a derivative manner and how tone is used to differentiate intransitive from transitive verbs.

[wɛ̂d̚] "to eat"
[wɛ̌d̚] "food"

[cʼɔ́ᵇm] "to bathe (oneself)"
[cʼɔ̂ːᵇm] "to bathe (someone)"

Vowel length is predictable and present in Dâw, yet not distinctive lexically. All vowels with a rising or falling tone are long, while all vowels without a tone are short.

== Orthography ==
The orthography used by the Dâw community is based on the Latin alphabet, with some correspondences coming from the Tukano language. Note that glottalized consonants are marked with the apostrophe before the consonant when the phoneme appears at the beginning of a word, and after the consonant when it appears anywhere else. Long vowels (i.e., those with tone) are written with two of the same vowel (e.g. nuu', "rat"). When the circumflex or tilde are used with long vowels, only the first of the two is marked with the diacritic (e.g. dêeb).

Grapheme	Phoneme	Dâw example	Meaning
⟨a⟩	/a/	aʼ /aʔ/	vessel (for holding liquids)
⟨ã⟩	/ã/	ãa /ã̂ː/	to sleep
⟨â⟩	/â/	âg /ɤ/	to drink
⟨b⟩	/b/	ba' /baʔ/	cold
⟨ç⟩	/c/	çâk /cɤk/	to jump
⟨d⟩	/d/	dâw /dɤw/	person, Dâw
⟨e⟩	/ɛ/	e' /ɛʔ/	to be big (of something with space inside)
⟨ẽ⟩	/ɛ̃/	ẽn /ɛ̃n/	if
⟨ê⟩	/e/	ê /e/	(interrogative marker)
⟨g⟩	/g/	gid /gid/	when (in some determined future)
⟨i⟩	/i/	id /id/	we
⟨ĩ⟩	/ĩ/	ĩw' /ĩwˀ/	groin
⟨j⟩	/ɟ/	jaay /ɟâːj/	after
⟨k⟩	/k/	kâat /kɤ̌ːt/	to stand
⟨l⟩	/l/	lôn /lon/	frog
⟨'l⟩ or ⟨l'⟩	/lˀ/	'lôx /lˀox/	to hang
⟨m⟩	/m/	mem /mɛm/	butterfly
⟨'m⟩ or ⟨m'⟩	/mˀ/	'mãn /mˀãn/	dolphin
⟨n⟩	/n/	nãm /nãm/	today
⟨'n⟩ or ⟨n'⟩	/nˀ/	'nãm' /nˀãmˀ/	to be dangerous
⟨nh⟩	/ɲ/	nhã /ɲã/	for what?
⟨'nh⟩ or ⟨nh'⟩	/ɲˀ/	ʉnh' /ɨɲˀ/	for hair to be curly
⟨o⟩	/ɔ/	ox /ɔx/	to run, to escape
⟨õ⟩	/ɔ̃/	õot /õ̌ːt/	to cry
⟨ô⟩	/o/	ôo /ôː/	to smile, to laugh
⟨p⟩	/p/	pis /piʃ/	to be small
⟨r⟩	/h/	ran /han/	to appear
⟨s⟩	/ʃ/	sãp /ʃãp/	piece
⟨t⟩	/t/	têk /tek/	to punch
⟨u⟩	/u/	ur /uh/	same
⟨ũ⟩	/ũ/	ũum /ũ̂ːm/	to strike/hit/beat, to shoot
⟨w⟩	/w/	wʉk /wɨk/	to be dirty
⟨'w⟩ or ⟨w'⟩	/wˀ/	'wad /wˀad/	rainbow
⟨x⟩	/x/	xêj /xeɟ/	anteater
⟨y⟩	/j/	yam /jam/	to dance
⟨'y⟩ or ⟨y'⟩	/yˀ/	'yãm /jˀãm/	dog
⟨ʉ⟩	/ɨ/	ʉb /ɨb/	to wake up
⟨ʉ᷈⟩	/ɨ᷈/	ʉ᷈u /ʉ᷈̂ː/	to growl
