= Nadëb language =

Nadahup language spoken in Brazil

Nadëb
- Nadabai
- Nadaba
- Native to: Brazil
- Region: Amazonas
- Ethnicity: 850 (2010)
- Native speakers: 370 (2011)
- Language family: Nadahup: Nadëb
- Dialects: Kuyawi

Language codes
- ISO 639-3: mbj
- Glottolog: nade1244
- ELP: Nadëb

Nadëb or Nadobai is a Nadahup language of the Brazilian Amazon, along the Uneiuxi, Japura, and Negro rivers. Various names for it include Nadöbö, Xïriwai, Hahöb, Guariba/Wariwa, Kaborí, Anodöub, sometimes compounded with the term Maku, as in Maku do Paraná Boá-Boá after one of the rivers in Nadëb territory.

== Phonology ==
	Front	Central	Back
Close	i ĩ	ɨ ɨ̃	u ũ
Close-mid	e	ə	o
Open-mid	ɛ ɛ̃	ʌ ʌ̃	ɔ ɔ̃
Open		a ã	

All vowels except for /e, ə, o/ have nasalized counterparts.

=== Consonants ===
		Bilabial	Alveolar	Palatal	Velar	Glottal
Nasal		m	n	ɲ	ŋ	
Plosive	voiceless	p	t		k	ʔ
Plosive	voiced	b	d	ɟ	g	
Fricative				ʃ		h
Approx./Tap			ɾ	j	w	
