= Kakua language =

Indigenous language of Colombia and Brazil

Kakwa
- Cakua
- Kãkwã
- Native to: Colombia, Brazil
- Region: Vaupés, Amazonas
- Ethnicity: Kãkwã people
- Native speakers: 250 (2015)
- Language family: Puinave-Maku ?: Northwestern Puinave-Maku ?; Nukak-Kakwa; Kakwa
- Writing system: Latin

Language codes
- ISO 639-3: cbv
- Glottolog: cacu1241
- ELP: Kakua
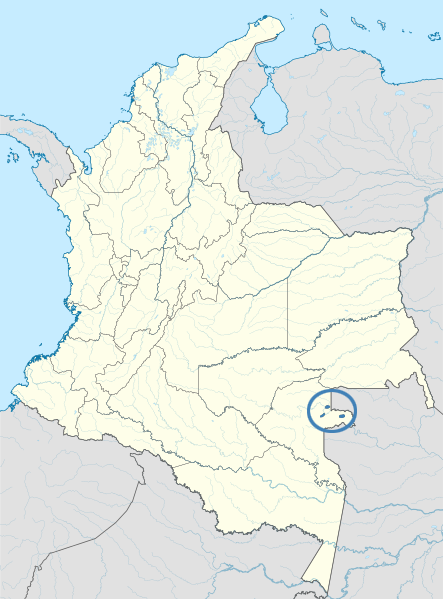

The Kakwa language, also spelled Kakua and Cacua, is an indigenous language spoken by a few hundred people in Colombia and Brazil. There are many monolinguals, especially children. Apart from being close to or a dialect of Nukak, its classification is uncertain.

== Overview ==
The language is spoken by indigenous American Cacua [Kakua] people that live in Colombian and Brazilian interfluvial tropical forests higher than 200 metres (660 ft) in elevation. The people have traditional livelihoods such as nomadic hunting-gathering and swidden agriculture. There are some non-native speakers of Cacua that are predominantly missionary workers. Their presence has resulted in the translation of religious Christian texts, notably the Christian Bible.

== Distribution ==
The speakers are located in Wacara (In Cacua: Wacará) which is 30 kilometres (19 mi) from Mitu (In Cacua and Spanish: Mitú) in the lower Vaupes Region. (In Spanish: Departamento del Vaupés). A second Kakua settlement is "Nuevo Pueblo" (New Town), which is an inland forest village between the Vaupés and the Papurí rivers.

== Classification ==
There are two dialects: Vaupés Cacua and Macú-Paraná Cacua. Cacua is mutually intelligible with Nukak, and is considered a dialect of the latter by Martins (1999). See that article for further classification.

Other names for this language include: Bára, Cakua, Kákwa, Macu de Cubeo, Macu de Desano, Macu de Guanano, Macú-Paraná, Wacara.

== Phonology ==
Kakwa has six vowels: /a, e, i, ɨ, o, u/. The /o/ sound occurs only marginally in the Wacara dialect, while being attested for the Nuevo Pueblo dialect. In nasal contexts only five vowels can occur.

Kakwa has seventeen consonants:

Consonants
		Labial	Alveolar	Palatal	Velar	Glottal
Stop	voiceless	p	t	t͡ʃ	k	ʔ
Stop	voiced	b	d		g	
Stop	creaky-voice	b̰	d̰		ɡ̰	
Fricative		f				h
Nasal		m	n	ɲ		
Approximant	plain			j	w	
Approximant	creaky-voice			j̰	w̰	

Nasalization in Kakwa is a prosodic property of the morpheme that affects all segments within each morpheme except voiceless stops and glottalized palatal glide in initial position. Each morpheme is either completely nasal or completely oral.

Kakwa is tonal and displays three contrastive phonological tones: rising (LH), falling, (HL), and low (L).

== Grammar ==
The language uses both subject-object-verb and object-verb-subject word order.

== Bilingualism and literacy ==
Reports gathered by SIL in 1982 stated that many speakers are monolingual, particularly children. Another promising aspect is that even though literacy is low by international standards, it is higher in the aboriginal language, at around 10%, compared to 5% in Spanish, the opposite situation of most indigenous languages of the Americas. Cacua uses a Latin alphabet.

== Sample text ==
Ded pah jwiít jwĩ jwíih cãac cha pahatji naáwát
