= Nukak language =

Endangered indigenous language of Colombia

Nukak
- Nɨkák náu'
- Pronunciation: [nɨkák náuʔ]
- Native to: Colombia
- Region: Department of Guaviare, Amazon Basin
- Ethnicity: Nukak
- Native speakers: 700 of Nukak proper (2010); 400 monolinguals (no date)
- Language family: Puinave-Maku?: Northwestern Puinave-Maku ?; Nukak-Kakwa; Nukak
- Dialects: Wayari; Meu; Taka; Miꞌpa

Official status
- Official language in: Colombia: Nukak territory
- Regulated by: Instituto Colombiano de Antropología e Historia

Language codes
- ISO 639-3: mbr
- Glottolog: nuka1242
- ELP: Nukak
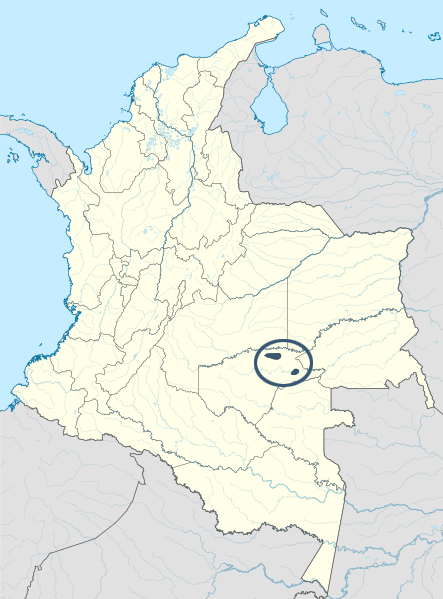

The Nukak language, or pejoratively Nukak Makú, is the language of the Nukak people. Other than being very closely related to Kakwa, it is of uncertain classification, perhaps part of the Puinave-Maku family.

== Phonology ==
=== Vowels ===
There are six oral and six nasal vowels.

	Front	Central	Back
Close	i ĩ	ɨ ɨ̃	u ũ
Mid	ɛ ɛ̃		ʌ ʌ̃
Open		a ã	

The vowel [u] becomes the labial semivowel [w] in several environments: in postnuclear position (when it appears immediately after the nuclear vowel of a morpheme), before another vowel, and at the beginning of the word or syllable. The semivowel [w] is devoiced (IPA symbol [ʍ]) if the tone rises and the following vowel is [i], [ĩ], [ɨ].

The vowel [i] becomes the palatal semivowel [j] in postnuclear position.

Nasalization in Nukak language is a prosodic property of the morpheme that affects all segments within each morpheme except voiceless stops. Each morpheme is either completely nasal or completely oral.

=== Consonants ===
There are eleven consonant phonemes: /p/; /b/ (realized as [m] with a nasal vowel, otherwise as [mb] at the start of a word, and as [bm] at the end of a word); /t/; /d/ (realized as [n] with a nasal vowel, otherwise as [nd] at the start of a word, and as [dn] at the end of a word); /tʃ/ (realized as [ts] or [tʃ] in free variation); /ɟ/ (realized as [ɲ] in a nasal environment); /k/; /ɡ/ (realized as [ŋ] in a nasal environment); /ɺ/ (lateral sonorant, alternating with the approximant [ɹ], the tap [ɾ], and the lateral approximant [l]); /h/; /ʔ/ (the glottal stop).

The following table of consonant phonemes shows each phoneme followed by the corresponding letter in the Nukak alphabet, where different.

		Bilabial	Alveolar	Palatal	Velar	Glottal
Occlusive	voiceless	p	t	tʃ ⟨c⟩	k	ʔ ⟨ꞌ⟩
Occlusive	voiced	b ~ m	d ~ n	ɟ ~ ɲ	ɡ ~ ŋ	
Continuant			ɺ ⟨r⟩			h

/ɺ/ is pronounced [t] when followed by /t/ and [d] when preceded by a voiced consonant. If /ɟ/ is preceded by [t] or [ʔ], it is pronounced voiceless [t͡ʃ]. With some infixes or prefixes, /ʔ/ is replaced by /n/ when it is followed by any vowel or /h/ or in nasal [n] suffixes.

The voiced palatal allophones [ɟ] ~ [ɲ] can be considered variants of the vowel [i] when they precede a vowel in the initial position of a root or of an affix, or when they lie between two vowels.

=== Tones ===
The nuclear vowels of nouns, verbs, and adjectives bear tone. Nukak has two tonemes (minimal pairs exist between them): high (H) and rising (LH). In the surface phonology there are also a low tone and a falling tone. The rising and falling tones are accompanied by lengthening of the vowel, however, the falling tone has been analyzed as actually being the allomorph of the high tone in closed syllables ending in [h] or an occlusive consonant, except [t] or in morpheme final open syllables. Unaccented syllables always bear the low tone (toneless).

The high and rising tones occur only in monosyllabic, monomorphemic lexemes. Multisyllabic morphemes are stressed on the first syllable.

== Grammar ==
=== Typology ===
The default word order in sentences is subject–object–verb (SOV). In any case, the subject always precedes the object. Verbs are conjugated for person. The language is agglutinative. The grammatical and lexical meanings expressed by prepositions in the Indo-European languages are expressed by suffixes in Nukak. Adjectives, which are not inflected for grammatical gender, usually follow their head noun.

=== Noun ===
The Nukak nouns are marked for gender, number, and case. There are two grammatical genders. The plural of animate nouns is indicated with the suffix -wɨn. Case markers include the following:

accusative -na
dative -ré' ("to")
instrumental -hî' ("with")
locative -rí' ("in", "by")
genitive -î ' ("of", "belongs to")

Depending on the noun lexeme, the vocative case is expressed by a tone change; by the suffix -a; or by duplicating the nuclear vowel after the root final consonant.

Nouns can take tense suffixes, e.g., -hîpî' , "that [masculine] which came before", and a question suffix, -má' . The connective formative -tɨ expresses either coordination with another noun, i.e., "also", or the clause conjunction, "and".

Noun classifying suffixes are common: -na' (long and slender), -da' "small and round", -dub "small, slender, and pointed", -nɨi "flat and thin", -ne "long-haired", -yi "abundant, profuse".

=== Pronouns ===
		Singular, subject	Singular, object	Plural, subject	Plural, object
First (I, we)		wéem	wéna	wíit	wítta
Second (you sg., you pl.)		méem	ména	yéeb	yebmna
Third masculine	close to speaker	nin	ninna	kéet	kéeta
Third masculine	less close to speaker but visible	kan	kanna	kéet	kéeta
Third masculine	far from speaker, not visible	kun	kunna	kéet	kéeta
Third feminine	close to speaker	nin'	nin'na	kéet	kéeta
Third feminine	less close to speaker but visible	kan'	kan'na	kéet	kéeta
Third feminine	far from speaker, not visible	kun'	kun'na	kéet	kéeta

Possessive pronouns are free forms: wî' "mine", mí' "yours singular", aî' "his", mi'î' "hers", wîi' "our", ñí' "yours plural, i'î' "theirs". The relations "my, your, her", etc. are expressed with prefixes on the possessed noun: wa "my", ma "your singular", a, "his", mi "her", hi "our", ñi "your plural", i "their". In conjugation, the same prefixes are agent (subject) markers. They occur either with or without personal pronouns.

==== Interrogative words ====
déi ("what?" "which" referring to things), de pán "what?" referring to actions, háu'ka, de'e "who?", déimɨnɨ "when?", ded "where?", jáu' why?". They combine with various other markers, e.g., case suffixes: the allative de' yúkú "towards where?", the instrumental de'e hin "with whom?", the genitive de'e î' "whose?". Interrogatives combine with tense markers as in jáu' ra' ("due to what?" + recent past).

=== Verbs ===
Verbs are conjugated with a subject prefix and with suffixes and infixes expressing aspect (continuous, immediate); tense (past, present, future) and mood (imperative, desiderative, interrogative). For example:

Past -nábé
Future -nátu'

dubitative -náhitu'

Conditional -'náno'
Present

imperfect -náka
negative -kaná
continuing -né'

Interrogative

past -yáa
future -pî'
conditional -no'pî'
present -ráa'

negative -ka

Desiderative -iná- ("perhaps")
Planeative -ɨí' - ("to plan" an action)
Repetitive -pî- ("repeatedly")
Agentive -rít ("because", "due to")

The imperative mood is formed by duplicating the last vowel of the verb stem, after the root final consonant or semivowel. The vowels [u] and [i] are pronounced as semivowels [w], [j] when duplicated after the final consonant.

The past imperfect is formed by suffixing to the stem the duplicate of the last vowel in the stem plus [p]: (-VC-Vp). The combination of the past imperfect suffix with the marker -tí´ marks a past subjunctive: jɨm "to be"; jɨmɨ "may have been"; past imperfect jɨmɨp "was"; subjunctive preterite jɨmɨptí´ "if it were".

Verbal negation is expressed in different ways: with the suffix -ka, which comes between the verb root and the tense, mood, and aspect markers; with certain prefixes to the verb stem; with the words yab´ , "no", dɨi´ , "refuse", îí´ , "without effect" . Negative commands have a specific marker, -kê´ .

There are many compound verbs. The elements may be two or more verb roots or they may be a verb root plus a noun, adjective, or adverb. The marker -a converts an intransitive verb root into a transitive verb.

Verbs are nominalized with the suffixes -hát, the abstract idea of the action, -pe' , the affected object, participle. The agent of the action is indicated with the agentive ("actance") prefix and a suffix expressing person and number. The agentive suffixes are -ni' for the first person, second person, and third person singular feminine; -ni for the third person singular masculine; and -nit for the third person plural. To these may be added the marker for imminence, currently in progress, or emphasis, -yé' .

All verb roots end in a consonant or semivowel. The meaning "to be" can be expressed in two ways: explicitly with the verb jɨm or tacitly through the various interrogative markers along with the personal pronouns, and occasionally with another verb, yit, which has the emphatic form yittí' , "I am".

=== Adverbs ===
The Nukak language has many adverb forms. Various adverbs are important in the construction of sentences. For example, they frequently use hébáká "indeed", and for even greater insistence, -yé' is suffixed. The verbal link tɨtíma'hî "after" can occur between the subject and the object and verb. Morphologically, some adverbs are independent words; these can follow nouns, like hattí' "also", "neither", "yet". There are some adverbial suffixes, e.g., -hê' "only", "precisely".

=== Interjections ===
Kútu' "Hey!", "Attention!" is an exclamation said in order to begin to speak. Other exclamatory words or phrases are hâré "Be careful!" or dɨpí hâré "Be very careful!"; waá'yé' "Enough!; be'bét yé' "Hurry up!"; ni'kábá'í' "That's it!".

== Sources ==
- Asociación Nuevas Tribus de Colombia 1982 a 1993 ("New Tribes of Colombia Association 1982 to 1993"): Informes trimestrales de actividades, presentados a la Dirección General de Asuntos Indígenas del Ministerio de Gobierno o del Interior, Bogotá: varios mecs. ("Trimestral Activities Report, Presented to the Board of General Indigenous Affairs of the Government or the Interior, Bogotá: various mecs.")
- Cabrera, Gabriel; Carlos Franky y Dany Mahecha 1999: Los N+kak: nómadas de la Amazonia colombiana; Bogotá: Universidad Nacional de Colombia. ISBN 958-8051-35-5
- Cathcart, Marylin 1979: "Fonología del Cacua", Sistémas Fonológicos Colombianos IV: 9-45. ILV; Lomalinda (Meta): Editorial Townsend.
- Hess, Richard; Kenneth Conduff and Jan Ellen Conduff 2005: Gramatica Pedagógica Provisional del idioma Nɨkák. Bogotá: Iglesia Nuevos Horizontes.
- Mahecha, Dany 2006 "Los nɨkak: experiencias y aprendizajes del contacto con otras gente". W. Leo Wetzels (ed.) Language Endangerment and Endangered Languages: Linguistic and Anthropological Studies with Special Emphasis on the Languages and Cultures of the Andean-Amazonian Border Area. ILLA – CNWS. Leiden University.
- Mahecha Rubio, Dany; Gabriel Cabrera y Carlos Franky 2000: "Algunos aspectos fonético-fonológicos del idioma Nukak [n+kak]"; Lenguas indígenas de Colombia. Una visión descriptiva: 547-560. María Stella González de Pérez ed. Bogotá: Instituto Caro y Cuervo.- ISBN 958-611-083-4
- Silverwood-Cope, Peter L. 1990 Os makú, povo caçador do nordeste da Amazônia. Editora Universidade de Brasília. ISBN 85-230-0275-8
