= Quingnam language =

Extinct language of Peru

Quingnam
- (Yunga) Pescadora, Chimú
- Native to: Chimor
- Region: north-central coast
- Ethnicity: Chimú
- Extinct: by 1763
- Language family: unclassified

Official status
- Official language in: Chimor

Language codes
- ISO 639-3: None (mis)
- Glottolog: quig1235
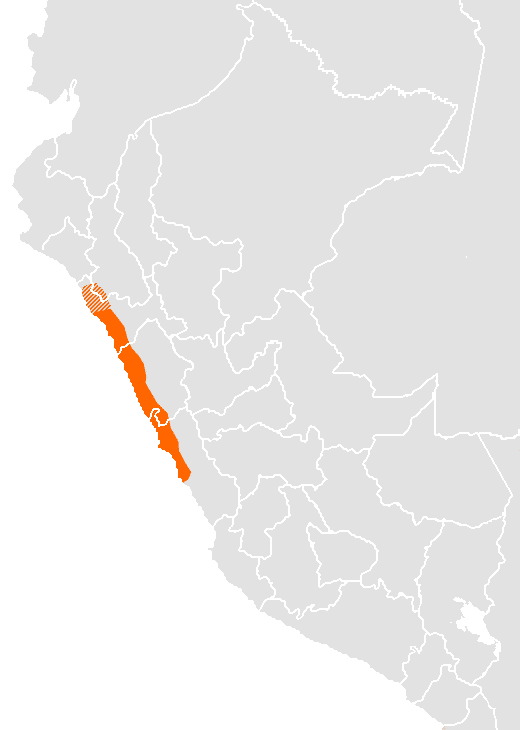
- Extent of Quingnam/Pescadora before replacement by Spanish

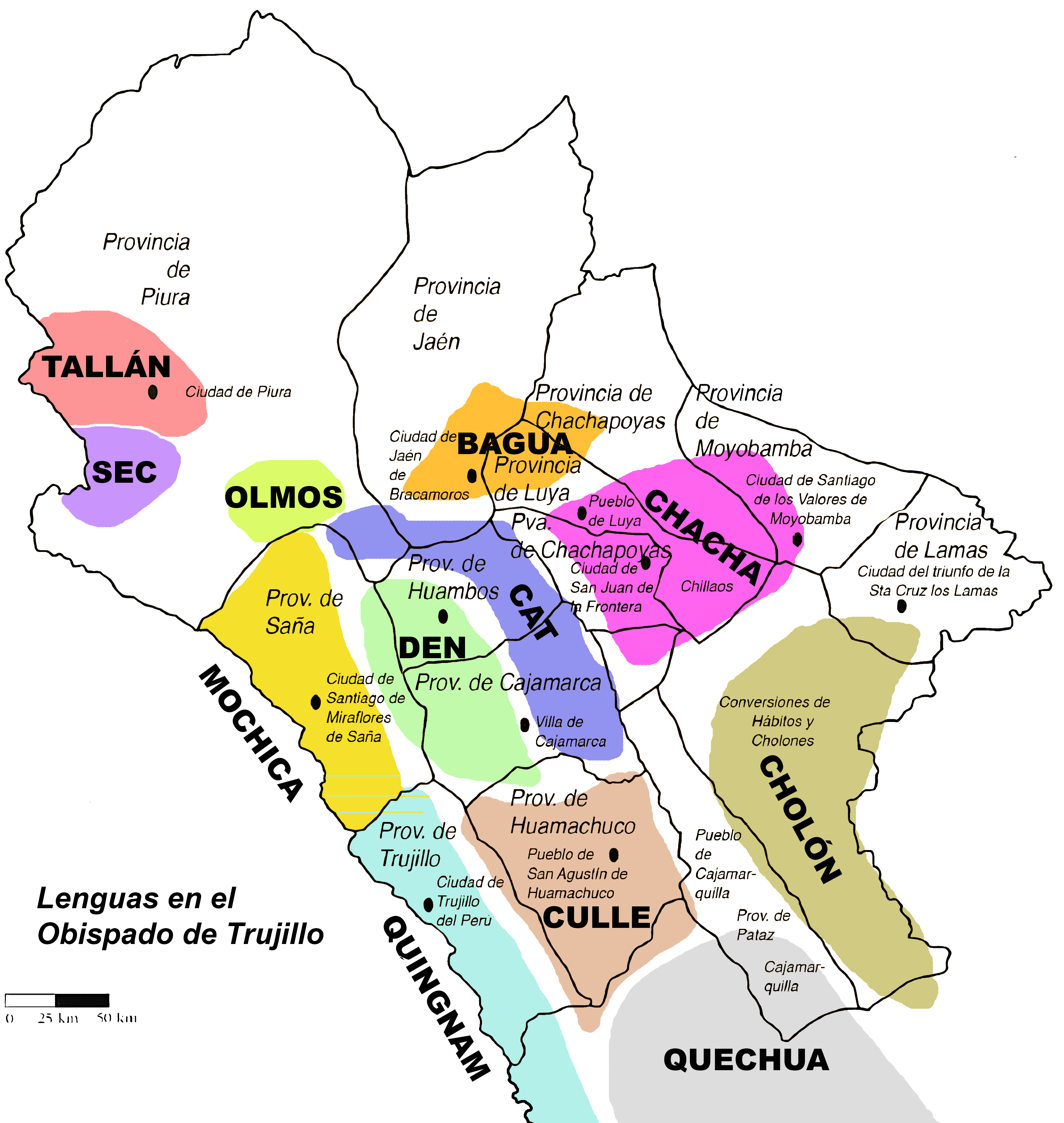
- Quingnam language area in the Bishopric of Trujillo, the city of Trujillo is shown as the main representative place of this language

Quingnam, (Note: The language name has also been misspelled Quignam.) also known as Chimú or Pescadora (though this name is ambiguous), is an extinct, poorly attested Indigenous language formerly spoken by the Chimú people on the coast of northern Peru. After the Spanish conquest, a number of grammars of the language were said to have been produced, but all of them have since been lost. The language went into decline and was extinct by 1763. It is virtually unknown, with a list of numerals, proper names and a few other scattered words constituting the only data on the language. However, a number of place names and personal names have been recorded from Quingnam, and some words presumably of Quingnam origin have been found in the local Spanish of the area it was formerly spoken in.

Quingnam was described by colonial-era chroniclers as of an "obscure and of slippery pronunciation" and "more resembles a language for the stomach, than for understanding". Proper names and place names in Quingnam commonly exhibit reduplication, where a root is repeated in the same or a similar form. It has been historically conflated with Mochica, another extinct language spoken in coastal Peru to the north of Quingnam, but is completely distinct and unrelated to it. Vocabulary taken to be of Quingnam origin bears similarities to that of other languages spoken in northern Peru, and some scholars have proposed that it shared a common origin with Sechura, another extinct language found on the coast of Peru in the region of the Sechura Desert.

== Etymology ==
There are various possible etymologies for the name Quingnam, which is likely an exonym. The first links it to the Mochica word king 'to spin'. The name would thus mean 'to spin, for spinning', with the assumption of a metaphorical link between spinning and speech. Peruvian linguist Rodolfo Cerrón-Palomino, however, rejects this as a popular etymology.

José Antonio Salas García suggests that quingnam may mean 'fisherman' in Quingnam, but the word for 'fisherman' in locations where Quingnam was spoken is recorded as guaxme, guachemin[es] or uachime instead.

According to Matthias Urban (2019), another etymology can be derived from the name of a person named Quin Namo. This person is only mentioned in a document called the Crónica de Ocxaguaman. The name has a similar structure to other names in the territory of Chimor, specifically in the presence of an element -namo, possibly designating a title of a lord. Since many other language designations of the Spanish derive from personal names, Urban suggests that Quin Namo could have been so important a figure as to have served as the namesake for his language.

== History ==
Quingnam was reported to be the official language of Chimor, the kingdom ruled by the Chimú, by chronicler Antonio de la Calancha. Chimor was founded around 900 AD and annexed into the Inca Empire around 1470.

=== Documentation ===
Ivan Meléndez (1681) mentioned that a grammar, dictionary and other documents describing a language spoken in the Chicama Valley were written by a Dominican friar named Pedro de Aparicio, who arrived there in the 16th century. The language that was described by Aparicio could be either Mochica or Quingnam, but these materials have not been found. Works by the Mercedarians Benito de Jarandilla and Bartolomé de Vargas have also been lost, including a grammar by Vargas titled Arte de la lengua que llaman pescadora. The name of the grammar strongly suggests that it is a description of Quingnam.

A letter dated to the early 17th-century was found during excavations in the ruins of a church at Magdalena de Cao Viejo in the El Brujo Archaeological Complex. It includes a list of decimal numerals on the back which are probably Quingnam (Pescadora).

=== Language contact ===
It is possible that Quingnam, along with Mochica, were in contact with the Cholón language, historically spoken along part of the Marañón River. Speakers of Quingnam may have traded goods, such as salt, with the Cholón people.

Quingnam shares a number of lexical items with other languages of the northern Peruvian coast and elsewhere. Urban (2019) lists four correspondences: possibly Quingnam choloque (?) 'tree which has a fruit encased in a green-yellow shell' : Culli choloc 'soapberry tree', possibly Quingnam maichill (?) 'kind of plant used in folk medicine' : Culli maichill~maichil 'Cascabela thevetia', possibly Quingnam cuchumic 'you are drunk' : Colán cũm 'drink' : Catacao conecuc 'drink' : Mochica cɥuma- 'drink' : Culli cumù 'drink' : Yurumanguí chuma 'drink', Quingnam chari '1' : Cuica kári '1'.

=== Extinction ===
Quingnam disappeared early in the colonial history of Peru. Toribio de Mogrovejo reported that Quechua was already spoken along portions of the central Peruvian coast in the early 16th century. Spanish had also begun to replace the native languages of the coast; for example, residents in Guaman in the Moche Valley already spoke Spanish in 1582. Quingnam is not mentioned in a 1651 document listing languages needed for the "evangelization of the North Coast", nor in Baltasar Jaime Martínez Compañón's late-18th-century Codex Martínez Compañón, indicating that by then, according to Urban (2019), "it was not considered relevant for the aims of the Spanish". Miguel Feyjoo reported that in 1763, Quingnam had already become extinct in favor of Spanish. The exact reason for its extinction is unclear. Spanish religious evangelism contributed to Indigenous language loss throughout Quechua-speaking regions, and in the region of Trujillo, much cultural loss can be attributed to major epidemics which drastically reduced the population. Nevertheless, it would appear as though some knowledge of vocabulary from the Indigenous language of Trujillo persisted past its demise; in 1793, some non-Quechua vocabulary was recorded in a general description of the area by D. José Ignacio de Lecuanda.

== Geographical distribution ==
At the height of the Chimú conquests, the language was spoken from the cities of Paita and Tumbes in the north to Paramonga in the south, possibly even further to Carabayllo, though its exact southern limits remain unclear. As of the time of Calancha, Quingnam was spoken in the Trujillo valleys. The northern limits of Quingnam distribution are considered to be in the towns of San Pedro de Lloc and Jequetepeque.

== Classification ==
Quingnam is far too poorly attested to be classified linguistically. The numerals found on the Magdalena de Cao letter do not correspond to their equivalents in Mochica, indicating that the language of the letter and Mochica were distinct and unrelated languages. Urban (2019) proposes that Quingnam be considered a language isolate. Luis Miguel Rojas-Berscia and Rita Eloranta-Barrera Virhuez (2019) believe that Quingnam may have been a variety of the same language as Sechura, another extinct language formerly spoken in the Sechura Desert in Piura Department, the two having been split into two by a late arrival of the Mochica language.

Prior to the identification of Quingnam and its respective documentation, it was sometimes treated as a synonym for or dialect of Mochica. Daniel Garrison Brinton, in his 1891 work The American Race, grouped the "Chimus", which he said were found "near Truxillo [sic]", within his "Yunca linguistic stock", alongside Mochica, Catacao and Colán, the latter two formerly found in the Department of Piura and subsumed under the label Tallán. Čestmír Loukotka and Paul Rivet, in their joint 1952 classification in the work Les langues du monde 'The Languages of the World', classified Quingnam with Mochica in their "Mučik" family. Loukotka, in his independent 1968 classification, later listed the "Casma" and "Paramonga" dialects, which he claimed were historically spoken along the Casma River and Fortaleza River respectively in the Department of Ancash, as members of his "Chimuan" language family. This family also included Mochica (which he called "Chimú"), the poorly known and extinct Cañari and Puruhá languages of Ecuador, as well as a number of supposed, undocumented languages in the same region. He further claimed that the name "Quingnam" was a synonym of Mochica. Norwegian linguist Even Hovdhaugen, in his grammar sketch of Mochica, speculated about the possibility of "Quignam [sic]" being related to Mochica, but erroneously claimed that "not a single word of Quignam has survived".

=== Lengua pescadora ===
Fishermen along the Chimú coast were reported to have spoken a language called Lengua Pescadora 'fisherman language' by Spanish missionaries, and disambiguated as Yunga Pescadora by linguists; this is presumably the same as Quingnam. A report by Calancha indicates that Pescadora and Quingnam were the same language, but Pescadora was more "guttural". However, the designation lengua pescadora has also referred to Mochica, entirely unrelated to Quingnam, as well, further confusing the designations. Willem Adelaar does not consider the issue of the lengua pescadora to be resolved. Eloranta (2020) believes that the term Pescadora was used as a cover term to designate all languages spoken in maritime regions, such as "by the seashore, next to the sea, in the Pacific coast, at harbors", as opposed to the Yunga languages, spoken inland and far from the coastal areas. Rojas-Berscia and Eloranta (2019) propose that the lengua pescadora was a "general label" referring to both Quingnam as well as Sechura.

== Phonology ==
A few phonological aspects of Quingnam may be deduced from the highly limited data, such as presence of word-final stress, and allowance of consonants in the coda position as evidenced by the word sut '6'. Colonial Spanish sources describe the language as more difficult than Mochica and of "obscure and of slippery pronunciation" according to Calancha.

That which among them is called la Pescadora, more resembles a language for the stomach, than for understanding; it is clipped, rough-sounding, guttural, and surly; with these two most common languages the communication of the valleys was held, and the commerce and business dealings of these territories was conducted.

— Calancha

=== Consonants ===
A number of sounds may be ascertained in Quingnam due to their relative incidence and corresponding phonetic values in Spanish. Among them are voiceless stops [p], [t], [k]; an affricate [tʃ]; nasals [m], [n], [ɲ]; two laterals, sometimes alternating with each other, [l] and [ʎ]; and an approximant [j]. Two sibilants at different points of articulation also appear, one alveolar, similar in quality to [s] and written as ⟨s⟩ or ⟨z⟩, and the other palatal as [ʃ], written ⟨x⟩. The sound written as ⟨r⟩ alternates with ⟨l⟩ and ⟨n⟩, making it more likely to be a tap [ɾ] rather than a trill [r]. The sound [w] may also be postulated based on orthographic alternations of sequences of ⟨ua⟩, ⟨guV⟩ (where V represents a wildcard for any vowel), ⟨ao⟩, as well as sometimes ⟨v⟩, and ⟨b⟩, present in both proper names and lexical items. Quingnam toponyms are distinguished from Mochica toponyms by the absence of /f/ and the presence of /w/. There are very few toponyms in the Moche Valley which contain this sound. The few cases where /f/ can be found in the Quingnam area have been suggested to derive from Mochica. In any case, the evidence for /f/ in Quingnam is very weak. The other letters representing fricatives are ⟨s⟩, ⟨sh⟩, ⟨x⟩, and ⟨j⟩. The first three alternate with each other before the vowel ⟨a⟩, which could indicate their phonetic value as some sort of postalveolar or palatal fricative, such as [ɕ] or [ç]. In addition, ⟨j⟩ alternates with ⟨x⟩ in both the initial and medial position, and may have still represented the fricative [ʒ] at the time in Spanish writing.

A number of alternations are noticeable in various proper names. For example, ⟨p⟩ can be found in a few instances alternating with [k], written as ⟨c⟩ or ⟨qu⟩, such as in the names Soloque~Solop and Occopmuña~Ocpocmuña. The latter is particularly notable as it implies that both [p] and [k] were present in the name, possibly even coarticulated as [k͡p], pronounced as a simultaneous [k] and [p]. This sound is rather rare in the world, found in only 12% of languages worldwide, but occurs in Muisca, a Chibchan language. An extremely frequent alternation of nasals is with zero, the absence of a sound, most commonly in the word-final position and in word-internal clusters. This may indicate a nasalization of the preceding vowel; the letters ⟨m⟩ and ⟨n⟩ are interchangeable in this position, which is indicative of a lack of a precise place of articulation. Further alternations include ⟨n⟩ and ⟨ñ⟩, particularly noteworthy because the two letters alternate in more than one token within the same form, such as in the name Canenam~Cañoñam.

==== Voiced stops ====
⟨b⟩ represents a confusing case for determining its phonetic value; in instances where it alternates with other letters, it can be shown to represent a fricative and not a stop, but in instances where the letter does not alternate with any others, according to Urban, "it is not clear to what extent scribes were projecting allophonic rules of their native language to the indigenous items". ⟨d⟩, in contrast, has a much clearer pronunciation; it is very rare in recorded toponyms, or place names, such as Canda, Capuxaida, and Simpad, the latter also written as Simbal and Simpat (which may be from Culli, another extinct language of Peru, instead). These cases may be due to voicing after nasals or intervocalically (between vowels). Finally, the letter ⟨g⟩ occurs in combination with ⟨ua⟩ and ⟨uo⟩ in word-initial and medial position (at the start or in the middle of a word), alternating with ⟨h⟩ and ⟨v⟩ and after ⟨n⟩ word-medially, as well as independent of other graphemes word-medially. A hapax legomenon spelling of the name Cuyuchi as Guyuche, with ⟨g⟩ word-initially, is also attested. The first environment in which ⟨g⟩ is found is evidently a transcription of [w] in a Spanish orthography, and the second can be explained as an instance of voicing after nasals. However, a few examples (e.g. Ningle~Ñingle) can be explained as a velar nasal [ŋ], and some instances of independent ⟨g⟩ may be due to errors in the transcription (e.g. Begap as a misspelling of Beguap, with an approximant or fricative instead). Nevertheless, the only explanation for certain occurrences of ⟨g⟩ is an intervocalic voicing, more common in medial than in initial position, although cases of these are infrequent.

=== Vowels ===
Five vowels may be posited based on the available data, being [a], [e], [i], [o], and [u]. There is no evidence to suggest that [e] and [o] are allophones, or phonetic variations, of their raised counterparts [i] and [u]. All vowels frequently alternate with zero in the penultimate syllable of trisyllabic forms, such as in Campcha(~)Campocha, (Note: Brackets around the tilde (~) indicate that the two forms are assumed to be variants of a single name.) with the alternating vowel's quality apparently being phonologically conditioned by the environment. For example, ⟨o⟩ is present in a non-front vowel environment, and ⟨i⟩ appears whenever it is present elsewhere in a form. This may be due to a schwa-type vowel which is realized differently based on the environment, or may be a case of vowel epenthesis due to Spanish influence, as suggested by Cerrón-Palomino. A very similar phenomenon also occurs in Mochica with its "sixth vowel", written as ⟨æ⟩ in the colonial grammars, so some of the examples above may actually belong to it rather than Quingnam.

=== Phonotactics ===
All consonants attested, except for a hypothetical [ŋ], occur in the word-initial position, although [ɾ] only occurs in two proper names, Rina and Rincha. The syllable structure of Quingnam is predominantly (C)V(C), where C represents a wildcard for any consonant and V for any vowel. Very few consonant clusters can be observed in proper names; for example, there are only eight such names attested in the Moche Valley, being Abcla, Olgpa, Ñingle~Ningle, Sevatr, Prexiran, Sept, Tingrahuaman, and the name of Xacchcac Guamanchumo, a ruler of Chimor. Plosives can be found word-finally in Quingnam, as in other languages of the region, though this is restricted in the Quechuan and Aymaran languages.

=== Stress ===
Stress in Quingnam was evidently word-final, as the vowel in names with three syllables frequently alternates with zero, indicating that the penultimate syllable did not take stress. In the rare cases when stress was marked, it "overwhelmingly falls on the ultima", according to Urban (2024). On the other hand, while stress in Mochica is largely unclear, the final syllable in Mochica is not considered to have been stressed.

== Grammar ==
Virtually nothing can be said about the grammatical structures of Quingnam. Nevertheless, a few salient features can be identified in the data. The constituent order in Quingnam appears to be dependent–head, similar to other languages of northern Peru, such as Culli. Additionally, Quingnam proper names and vocabulary show significant reduplication involving roots of one syllable of the shape CVC (thereby resulting in a reduplicated syllable structure of CVCCVC), such as in the names Quin Quin or Pur Pur. Urban (2019) considers reduplication in Quingnam to be "apparently" unrelated to sound symbolism and not the result of grammatical processes and "simply the way the forms are stored in the lexicon".

The suffix -na can be identified in lexical data possibly attributable to Quingnam, though it is uncertain if it is actually Quingnam, such as in the words quirana 'binding with which the reeds composing a roll or bundle is bound in the reed raft used for fishing in Huanchaco', huabina 'freshwater fish', huangana 'binding for reed raft', (Note: a Quechua etymology from wanqu 'strap, lace' has also been proposed) and palana 'shovel or spade used in agriculture'. (Note: which is apparently derived from Spanish pala 'shovel' with the element -na, which could also be the Quechua instrument nominalizer -na) Two lexical items found in local Spanish, maimenec 'shut up' and cuchumic 'drunk', which Urban (2019) considers to be "likely morphologically complex", would seem to have a common ending -Vc, although he admits it is speculative. Urban (2019) finds the evidence for prefixes in Quingnam to be weaker; one of the elements he identifies is cho-, found in the Spanish local vocabulary items cuchumic 'drunk', chomuña 'old', and chollenque 'lean, shabby'. The separation of this element is possibly supported by a possible relation between munaos, which refers to "the coastal equivalent to the mallquis, ancestor mummies venerated as huacas, of the highlands", with chomuña 'old'.

== Vocabulary ==
Quingnam is extremely poorly attested. The primary source generally attributed in it is the letter discovered at the El Brujo complex in 2010, containing 14 numerals in a language generally assumed to be Quingnam. The numerals are quite dissimilar to those in Mochica, but some show clear signs of being loaned from Quechua. A few other scattered words are mentioned by colonial sources, as well as some possible Quingnam-derived words in the local dialect of Spanish spoken in the region today. In addition to these sources, proper names, including personal names and toponyms, can be taken to be derived from Quingnam, and analyzed accordingly.

=== Numerals ===
Below are the numerals from the letter found at Magdalena de Cao. Although the manuscript does not indicate which language the numerals belong to, Quingnam is assumed as it is the most likely candidate based on location and notable dissimilarity to Mochica:

Numeral	Form
1	chari
2	marian
3	apar
4	tau
5	himic (?)
6	sut (?)
7	canchen
8	mata
9	yucan
10	bencor
21	mari bencor chari tayac
30	apar bencor
100	chari pachac
200	mari pachac

==== Analysis ====
The numerals tau '4', sut '6', canchen '7', and pachac '100' are loanwords from a variety of Quechua II, being tawa, suqta, qanchis, and pachac in Quechua respectively. The form for '4' in the Quechuan languages spoken near Quingnam today is chusku, unrelated to the Quingnam form. Salas (2023) believes that yucan '9' may also be borrowed from Quechua isqun '9'. Rojas-Berscia and Eloranta (2019) also link the element yac in tayac, thought by Quilter et al. to be a "conjunction or a compounding element", to the Quechua form -yaq 'which has…' as well. The words for 1, 2, and 3, chari, marian and apar, evidently contain unmarked bound morphemes, in contrast to Quilter et al. (2010), who claimed that "the numbers from one to ten are quite probably monomorphemic (i.e., unanalyzable and distinct unto themselves)". marian, when compared with the forms maribencor chari tayac '21' and mari pachac '200', apparently contains a suffix -an, as does yucan '9'; in addition, the three words may also contain a common suffix -ari if apar '3' is derived from an original form *apari. Urban (2019) identifies a parallel with the numerals of Pumé (kjãr̃ẽ́me '1', ñõãr̃ı̃́ '2' and tjarar̃ı̃́ '3', of which the latter two contain the sequence -ar̃ı̃́, and kjãr̃ẽ́me may as well), which he claims are "strikingly similar formally". Rojas-Berscia and Eloranta (2019) identify a common element -an/-en in the numerals marian '2', canchen '7', and yucan '9', as well as in vocabulary from Sechura. They thus speculate that the element -an was thus a classifier for stones or grains, as it is in other languages such as Hibito–Cholon, Cahuapanan and Muniche, used to refer to small animals or grains. In addition, sut '6' may have been pronounced as *[suʔt] as a loan from Quechua.

=== Other words ===
Calancha gives the etymology of the name of Pacatnamu as meaning 'father of all' or 'common father', due to his "benevolent treatment" of the peoples he conquered, and that the name of Pacasmayo is a corruption of it, and gives the word for 'god' as vini in the language of the "maritimos Pescadores". Presumably the element -namo or -namu is some kind of title meaning 'father' or 'lord', due to its common occurrence in personal names, which would leave the element pacat with the meaning 'common, all'. Feijoo gives the word chimo as meaning 'powerful' in Quingnam, though the language had already gone extinct at the time of his writing.

Another possible word in Quingnam, patà, which refers to a deity and a constellation composed of Alnitak and Mintaka in Orion's Belt, is not registered in any Mochica documentation and is phonologically unusual for Mochica. The term munaos is presumably Quingnam, or at least of a coastal language, due to the presence of a Don Francisco de Azabache Munao Chimo listed as the cacique of Moche in the 17th century. However, it may instead be related to Mochica munà/mena 'grandfather'. Other such terms include morpis 'punishing gods', yale 'strong variety of chicha offered to huacas' (the Mochica word for 'chicha' is cutzhio), this particular term being used "northward" of Chancay, and ñaca 'cut hair offered to huacas'. Mogrovejo, in his description of the Santa Valley, includes two words from Indigenous languages of the region: pez 'reed plantation', and also states that its "actual name" is saucha. It is unclear what Mogrovejo meant by "actual name"; perhaps these words come from the same language, but referred to different things, or they could be from different languages. The Mochica word for 'grass' is pei, and the Quechua word sacha, depending on dialect, means 'weeds' or bushes', which could be linked to saucha.

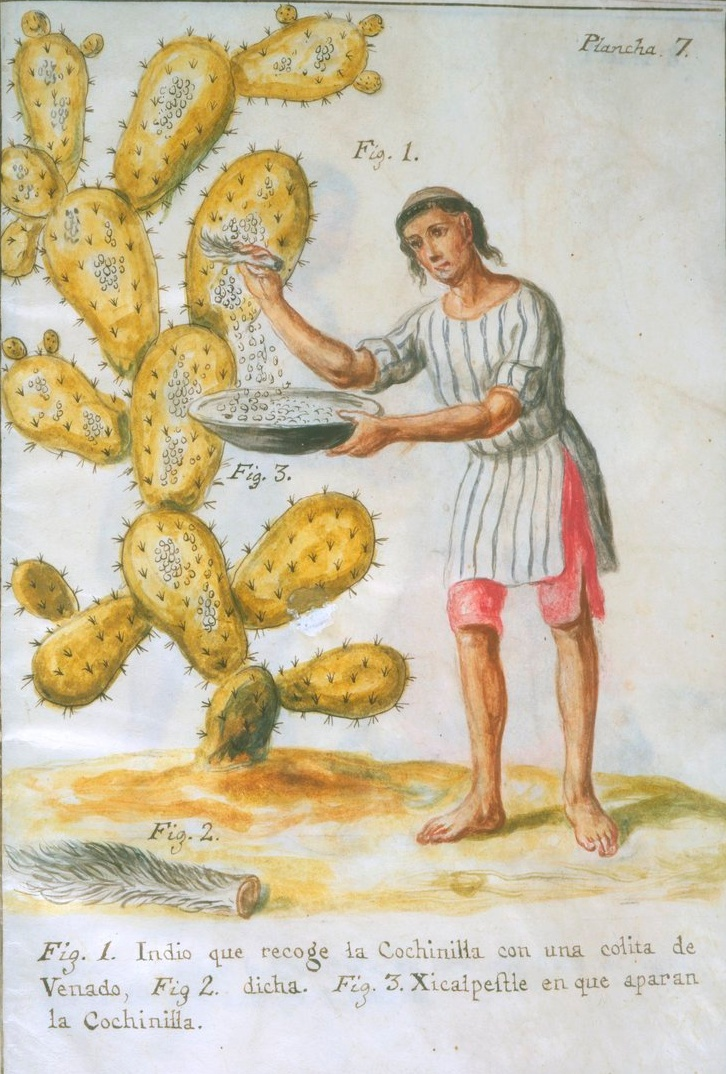
The cactus maran, with pilcái being collected from it

Lecuanda's 1793 description of flora and fauna in the region of Trujillo mentions a number of words that do not have a Spanish origin. He gives machira 'swordfish', chita 'an unidentifiable edible fish', sinamon 'cypress', taparte 'kind of shrub', maran 'a cactus', on which pilcái 'cochineals' lived. Of these, only maran bears any similarity to a language not spoken on the coast of Peru, having a possible relationship to Pacaraos Quechua mara 'agave'.

As late as 1811, an anonymous priest documented the customs of Virú residents in a report. A number of seemingly Indigenous-language vocabulary terms are found in the report, which cannot be etymologized through any known language of the northern coast of Peru, though equivalents in these languages could also be completely unknown. These terms include colao and anchaco, which refer to varieties of chicha, circil, a sort of textile used to "store maize in holes in the sand for preservation and to sieve it later", a kind of calabash called pulluyo, and a plant "probably" called casoco used in pulverized form for medicinal use, a tree called oberal or nier whose flowers were used to cure jaundice, (Note: oberal is also mentioned in the Piura region, though nier seems to be a more regional term) pay pay 'flour', (Note: cf. Mochica pei 'grass') and an unspecified animal called pac pac "used to cure hernia by opening it alive and placing it on the sick part of the body". A sort of vulture with a red head, possibly the turkey vulture, has a name beginning with vll, the rest of the name being illegible.

=== Loanwords in other languages ===
In the earliest dictionary of any Quechuan language, two peculiar words with no other Quechuan-language equivalents are found: guaxme 'fisherman' and thome 'sea lion'. In particular, guaxme is found in two other colonial descriptions in the context of a population name, the first in a report made by the Augustinians mentioning that the inhabitants of Huamachuco had "expelled or exterminated" a group called guachemines from the area, and a second by Felipe Guaman Poma de Ayala mentioning a "settlement" of the uachime yunga. The variety of Quechua found in the dictionary is typically considered to be the now-extinct Coastal Quechua, which would have been spoken near Quingnam and received lexical influence from it.

In 1975, Jorge Zevallos Quiñones compiled a list of words used in the local Spanish used around Trujillo which were derived from non-Spanish sources. These include words taken from colonial documents, but most of them were collected in Moche by Eduardo Calderón Palomino, where they were still in use as of that time. Most of the words are for cultural items or flora and fauna of the region. In particular, fishing-related vocabulary features prominently in the list. A number of words collected are not of Quingnam origin, though much of the vocabulary could also be. For example, vocabulary from Mochica may be identified by the distinctive presence of /f/, a sound which was probably not found in Quingnam, found in the words flique 'small crustacean which parasitizes the shell of sea snails' and faique 'fruit of algarrobo tree'. Likewise, Quingnam words are probably identifiable by the presence of the sound /w/, such as in cahuan, referring to a sort of fishing net used in rivers or lagoons. Likewise, John Gillin's (1945) ethnographic description of Moche also includes various non-Spanish words used by locals, some of which are exclusive to his document. These words could all be from an unrecorded third language once spoken in the region, but could also be of Quingnam provenance.

== See also ==
- Chimú culture
