= Chimuan languages =

Proposed Andean language family

Chimúan
- Yuncan, Yunga-Puruhá
- (not widely accepted)
- Geographic distribution: Peruvian coast
- Linguistic classification: Proposed language family
- Subdivisions: Mochica (Yunga); Cañari–Puruhá

Language codes
- Linguasphere: 84-AA
- Glottolog: None

Chimuan (also Chimúan) or Yuncan (Yunga–Puruhá, Yunca–Puruhán) is a hypothetical small extinct language family of northern Peru and Ecuador in the inter-Andean valley. They are held to comprise the Mochica (Yunga), Cañari–Puruhá, and Huancavilca.

== Family division ==
Chimuan is proposed to be consisted of at least three attested languages:

- Chimuan
  - Mochica (a.k.a. Yunga, Chimú)
  - Cañari–Puruhá
    - Cañari (a.k.a. Cañar, Kanyari)
    - Puruhá (a.k.a. Puruwá, Puruguay)

All languages are now extinct.

Campbell (2012) classifies Mochica and Cañari–Puruhá each as separate language families.

Mochica was one of the major languages of pre-Columbian South America. It was documented by Fernando de la Carrera and Middendorf in the seventeenth and nineteenth centuries respectively. It became extinct around 1920, although some people remembered a few words into the late 20th century. Most scholars consider Mochica a language isolate.

Cañari and Puruhá are documented with only a few words. These two languages are usually connected with Mochica. However, as their documentation level is so low, it may not be possible to confirm this association. According to Adelaar & Muysken (2004), Jijón y Caamaño's evidence of their relationship is only a single word: Mochica nech "river", Cañari necha; based on similarities with neighboring languages, he finds a Barbacoan connection more likely.

Quingnam, considered the same language as the lengua pescadora, was sometimes erroneously taken to be a dialect of Mochica, but it is effectively unattested, excepting a list of numerals discovered in 2010 thought likely to be of Quingnam or Pescadora as expected. These numerals are not, however, Mochica.

=== Mason (1950) ===
Yunca-Puruhán (Chimuan) internal classification by Mason (1950):

- Yunca–Puruhán
  - Yuncan
    - North group (Puruhá-Cañari)
      - Puruhá
      - Canyari (Cañari)
      - Manabila (Mantenya)
    - South group (Yunca)
      - Yunga
      - Morropé
      - Eten (?)
      - Chimu
      - Mochica (Chincha)
      - Chanco
  - Atalán
    - Wancavilca (Huancavilca)
      - Mania
      - Tumbez
      - Puna
      - Carake: Apichiki, Cancebi

Mason (1950) added Atalán to the family.

=== Tovar (1961) ===
Tovar (1961), partly based on Schmidt (1926), adds Tallán (Sechura–Catacao) to Chimuan (which he calls Yunga-Puruhá). Tovar's (1961) classification below is cited from Stark (1972).

- Yunga–Puruhá
  - Northern (Puruha-Cañari)
    - Puruhá
    - Cañari
  - Central (Tallán)
    - Sec
    - Sechura
    - Colán
    - Catacaos
  - Southern
    - Yunga

== Proposed external relationships ==
Stark (1972) proposed a Maya–Yunga–Chipayan macrofamily linking Mayan with Uru–Chipaya and Yunga (Mochica).

== See also ==
- Mochica language
- Sechura–Catacao languages
