= Cholón language =

Language of Peru

Cholón
- Seeptsá
- Native to: Peru
- Region: Huallaga River valley
- Ethnicity: Cholones
- Extinct: 1993, with the death of Victoria Cerquera Ojeda >2 rememberers (2021)
- Language family: Hibito–Cholon: Cholón
- Writing system: Latin

Language codes
- ISO 639-3: cht
- Glottolog: chol1284
- Linguasphere: 84-DBA-aa
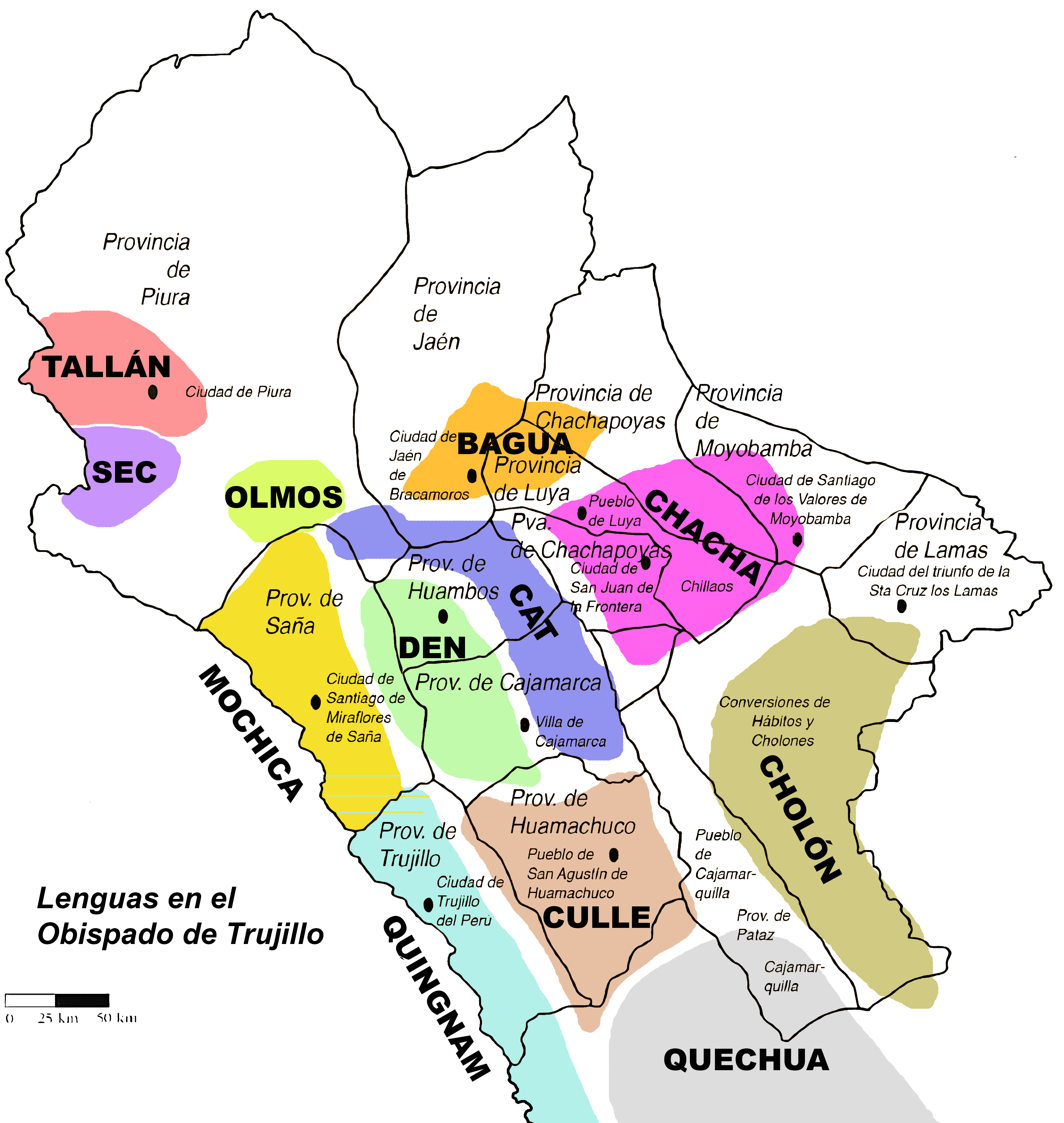
- Cholón

- Cholon is classified as Extinct by the UNESCO Atlas of the World's Languages in Danger.

Cholón, natively known as Seeptsá and also as Tsinganes, is a language of Peru considered extinct. It was spoken near Uchiza, from Tingo María to Valle in the Huallaga River valley of Huanuco and San Martín regions. The last fluent speaker of Cholon, Victoria Cerquera Ojeda, died in 1993, but a number of semispeakers of the language remain.

== History ==
=== Documentation ===
The Cholon language is primarily documented in an 18th-century grammar titled Arte de la Lengua Cholona, written by the Franciscan friar Pedro de la Mata. A number of other colonial-era documents about Cholon are also known to have existed, including the 17th-century Arte y Vocabulario de la Lengua Cholona, by another Franciscan priest, Francisco Gutiérrez de Porres, who is also known to have translated a number of Christian doctrines into the language, as did the Franciscan priest Joseph de Araujo for Hibito, a closely related and extinct language, but these works have since been lost. The 18th-century Arte includes a list of Cholon- and Hibito-speaking villages, possibly indicating it could be used for both languages. de la Mata also indicates that he used material from both Gutiérrez de Porres and de Araujo, potentially mixing data from Cholon and Hibito, which would indicate that the two languages were mutually intelligible and "looked alike".

The Plan of Martínez Compañón

Cholon is additionally attested in a 43-word list in a document referred to as the "plan" collected by Bishop of Trujillo Baltasar Jaime Martínez Compañón between 1782 and 1785. The "plan" is part of a larger work, known as the Codex Martínez Compañón, detailing life in colonial Peru. Notably, the work also contains a number of watercolors, which were captioned by Martínez Compañón's personal secretary Pedro Agustín de Echevarri, who presumably also wrote down the "plan".

There are two copies of the "plan", one held in Bogotá and the other in Madrid. Both copies include 43-word lists for the Quechua, Mochica (Yunga), Sechura, Colán, Catacaos, Culli, Hibito and Cholón languages, as well as Spanish. The Colán and Catacaos languages are generally subsumed under the name Tallán, and they are closely related, probably dialects of a single language. The two versions of the "plan" have certain differences from each other, particularly in the spelling of the transcriptions.

Cholon is also attested in some 20th-century documents, including in Günter Tessmann's (1930) Die Indianer Nordost-Perus, which also contains a wordlist in Hibito. Following that, the Peruvian linguist Sofia Latorre is also reported to have documented Cholon from its last speakers, but have remained unpublished as of 2005.

=== Decline ===
By 1964, Čestmír Loukotka (1968) reported that Cholon was nearly extinct and being replaced by Quechua. Jorge A. Suárez (1984), in his entry for the Encyclopædia Britannica, described it as extinct. However, two speakers of Cholon were reported in 1986. The last fluent speaker, Victoria Cerquera Ojeda, died in 1993.

=== Recent history ===
The language was previously thought to be extinct, but a native speaker was identified in 2021 in the city of Juanjuí. Martha Pérez Valderrama is believed to be one of the last remaining rememberers or semispeakers of Cholón. However, her cousin Clemente also speaks Cholón, and she reports that there are more speakers in the area. Despite the last fully fluent speakers dying in the 1990s, the current speakers can produce brief texts, not being limited to basic words and phrases.

== Classification ==
Cholon is closely related to the extinct Híbito in the Hibito–Cholon family, spoken in the same geographical region. This relationship was recognized by a number of early-20th-century scholars, including Alexander Francis Chamberlain (1913), Jacinto Jijón y Caamaño (1941-43), and Henri Beuchat and Paul Rivet (1909). Matthias Urban (2021) groups a number of poorly attested and long-extinct languages of northern Peru, such as Chachapoya, -den, and -cat, all of which are known exclusively from toponyms, or place-names, with the Hibito-Cholon languages, which he calls Cholonoid.

== Phonology ==
Due to the amateur Spanish pronunciation spellings used to transcribe Cholon, its sound inventory is uncertain. The following is an attempt at interpreting them.

=== Consonants ===
		Labial	Alveolar	Palatal	Velar	Glottal
Nasal		m	n	ɲ	ŋ	
Stop	voiceless	p	t		k	ʔ
Stop	voiced	(b~β)	(d)		g	
Affricate			ts	tʃ		
Fricative		(f)	s	ʃ	x	h
Vibrant			(r)			
Lateral			l	ʎ		
Approximant		w		j		

Consonants in (brackets) are only found in loanwords. /g/ is exclusive to one word, pangala 'forest turkey'.

[h] and [ʃ] are analyzed as allophones of /x/ and /s/, respectively.

=== Vowels ===
The vowels appear to be similar to Spanish [a e~ɪ i o~ʊ u].

== Grammar ==
Cholon distinguishes masculine and feminine grammatical gender in the second person. That is, one uses different forms for "you" depending on whether one is speaking to a man or a woman:

katsok	'house'
aktsok	'my house'
miktsok	'your house' (speaking to a man)
piktsok	'your house' (speaking to a woman)
intʃamma	'what did you say?' (speaking to a man)
intʃampa	'what did you say?' (speaking to a woman)

== Syntax ==
The language has a subject–object–verb word order
