= Tallán language =

Extinct unclassified language of Peru

Tallán
- Native to: Peru
- Region: Piura Region
- Ethnicity: Tallán
- Extinct: early 19th century
- Language family: Sechura-Catacao?: Tallán
- Dialects: Catacao; Colán

Language codes
- ISO 639-3: None (mis)
- Glottolog: tall1235
- Linguasphere: 84-BAA-ab
- 84-CA
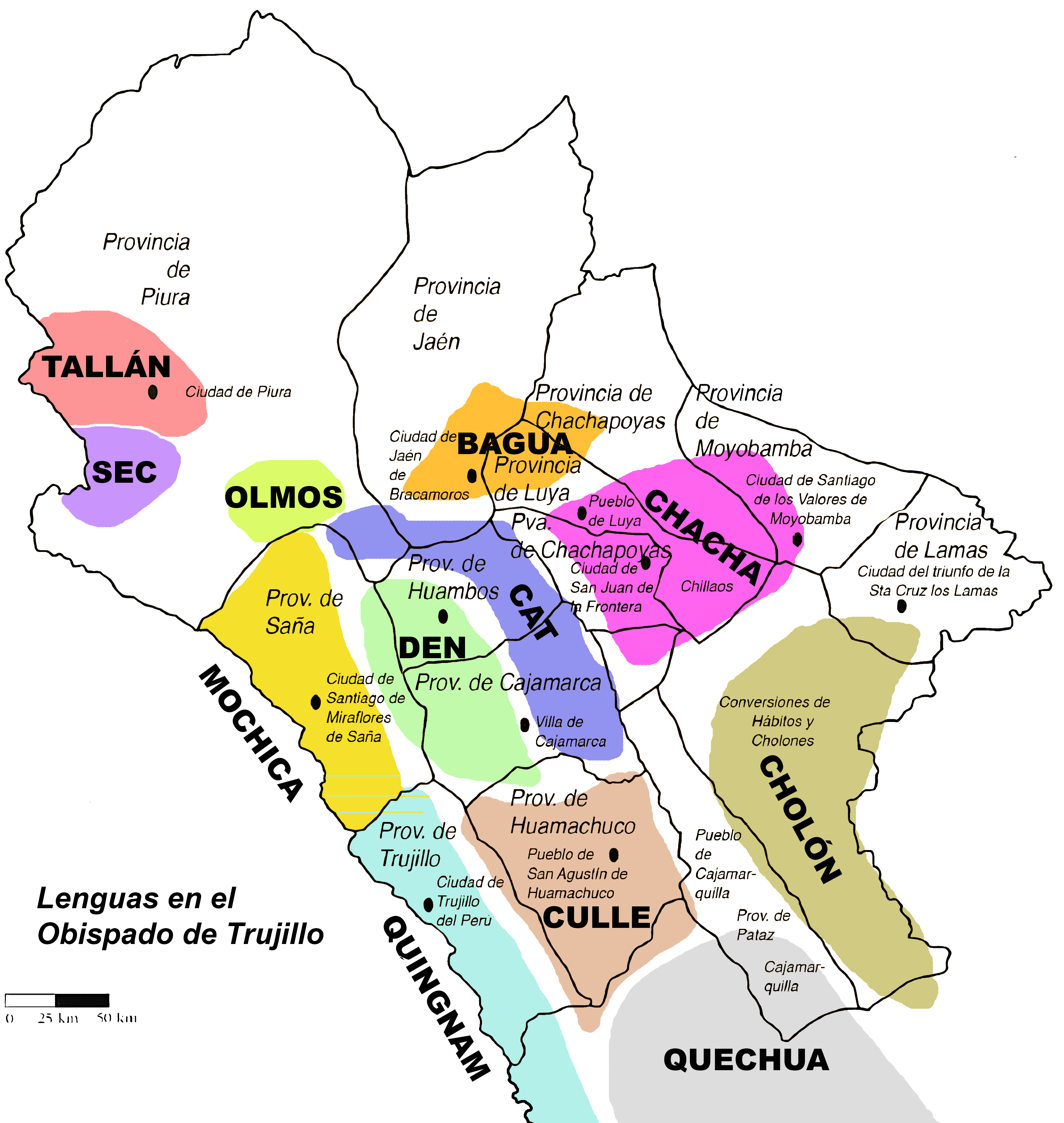
- Tallán

Tallán is an extinct and poorly attested language of the Piura Region of Peru. It is too poorly known to be definitively classified. It may have a possible connection to neighboring Sechura, termed the Sechura–Catacao languages.

== Dialects ==
Loukotka (1968) makes reference both to Tallán and the Catacaoan language family, which are synonymous, treating Tallán as related to Sechura but Catacaoan as a distinct family. He lists the following three languages:

- Catacao or Katakao, once spoken around the city of Catacaos
- Colán or Kolán, once spoken between the Piura River and Chira River
- Chira or Lachira or Tangarará, once spoken along the Chira River. (Unattested.)

Terrence Kaufman includes the Leco language of Bolivia in the Catacaoan group.

Catacao and Colán are subsumed into the extinct Tallán language as dialects, thus making the Catacaoan family synonymous with Tallán.

== Vocabulary ==
=== Earlier works ===
Around 1596, Bishop of Quito Luis López de Solís commissioned catechisms and grammars to be written for the Indigenous languages of his diocesis, including "la lengua […] tallana", but it is uncertain if these works were ever produced.

=== The "plan" of Martínez Compañón ===
Tallán is known entirely from a 43-word list in a document referred to as the "plan" collected by Martínez Compañón between 1782 and 1785. The "plan" is part of a larger work, known as the Codex Martínez Compañón, detailing life in colonial Peru. Notably, the work also contains a number of watercolors, which were captioned by Martínez Compañón's personal secretary Pedro Agustín de Echevarri, who presumably also wrote down the "plan".

There are two copies of the "plan", one held in Bogotá and the other in Madrid. Both copies include 43-word lists for the Quechua, Mochica (Yunga), Sechura, Colán, Catacaos, Culli, Hibito and Cholón languages, as well as Spanish. The Colán and Catacaos languages are generally subsumed under the name Tallán, and they are closely related, probably dialects of a single language. The two versions of the "plan" have certain differences from each other, particularly in the spelling of the transcriptions.

A number of diacritics are employed in the vocabularies. Their meaning is not elaborated upon in the "plan", although certain diacritics are employed in only some of the languages, and are apparently not merely decorative in purpose. Notably, the Colán list uses numerous diacritics, whereas the Catacaos list has almost none. This may be due to the vocabularies collected by different authors.

==== Wordlist ====
(M) indicates a reading of the Madrid list, and (B) indicates the Bogotá list.

Catacao and Colán wordlist
gloss	Colán	Catacao
god	tios̃	thios
man	yatã(-)dlam	aszat
woman	pir-n (M) / pi-m (B)	pi-chi(-)m
soul	alma	alma
body	cuerpo	cuerpo
heart	ñessini-m	ñiesiñi-chi(-)m
meat/flesh	carne	ccol
bone	dladlapi(-)rãm (M) / dladlape(-)rãm (B)	lalape(-)chen
father	ma-m̃	pateri
mother	nũn (M) / nuñ (B) (?)	ni-chi(-)m
son	hicu-m̃	ycu-chi(-)m
daughter	hicu-m̃	ycu-chi(-)m capuc
brother	pua-m̃	pua-chi(-)m
sister	puru-m̃	puru-chi(-)m
eat	aguã	agua-chi(-)m
drink	cũ-m (M) / cum̃ (B) (?)	conecuc
laugh	chañar	chañac
cry	nãr (M) / ñãr (B) (?)	ñar-acñaquitutin
die	dlacati	lacatu
joy	chagasiñ	gozo
pain	masic	masic
death	dlacati	ynatac-lacatu
sky	cutũc-nap	cielo
sun	turi-nap	nap
moon	nag	nam
stars	chupuchup	estrellas
fire	huỹur	guanararac
wind	cuiat ñap (M) / cuiat ñag (B)	vic
bird	yaiau	yeya
earth	dlurũm	durum
animal	animal	animal
tree	arbol	chigua(-)sam
trunk	tũcu-rãm (M) / tùcu-ram̃ (B) (?)	tucci-càs
branch	yabi-ti(-)ram (M) / yabmram (B) (?)	yabi-que
flower	flor	alhuaca
fruit	fruto	cosecha-m
grass	agua-col	t(-)agua-col
water	yũp	yup
sea	amum	amaun
river	yũp	turu-yup
waves	llam(-)as	olas
rain	nug̃	guayaquinum / guaraquinum (?)
fish	llas	llas
