= Colán dialect =

Extinct Catacaoan language of Peru

Colán
- Kolán
- Native to: Peru
- Region: Piura Region
- Ethnicity: Colánes
- Extinct: by 1864
- Language family: Sechura–Catacao?: Tallán; Colán

Language codes
- ISO 639-3: None (mis)
- Glottolog: cola1238
- Linguasphere: 84-CAB-aa
- Map of all Catacaoan languages, with Colan in the middle of the yellow area

Colán (Kolán) is an extinct dialect of Tallán, a language isolate of Peru. It is known solely from a wordlist collected in the 1780s by Bishop of Trujillo Baltasar Jaime Martínez Compañón. It may be related to the nearby Sechura language, but this is not confirmed.

== Vocabulary ==
=== Earlier works ===
Around 1596, Bishop of Quito Luis López de Solís commissioned catechisms and grammars to be written for the Indigenous languages of his diocesis, including "la lengua […] tallana", but it is uncertain if these works were ever produced.

=== The "plan" of Martínez Compañón ===
The Plan of Martínez Compañón

Colán is known entirely from a 43-word list in a document referred to as the "plan" collected by Martínez Compañón between 1782 and 1785. The "plan" is part of a larger work, known as the Codex Martínez Compañón, detailing life in colonial Peru. Notably, the work also contains a number of watercolors, which were captioned by Martínez Compañón's personal secretary Pedro Agustín de Echevarri, who presumably also wrote down the "plan".

There are two copies of the "plan", one held in Bogotá and the other in Madrid. Both copies include 43-word lists for the Quechua, Mochica (Yunga), Sechura, Colán, Catacaos, Culli, Hibito and Cholón languages, as well as Spanish. The Colán and Catacaos languages are generally subsumed under the name Tallán, and they are closely related, probably dialects of a single language. The two versions of the "plan" have certain differences from each other, particularly in the spelling of the transcriptions.

A number of diacritics are employed in the vocabularies. Their meaning is not elaborated upon in the "plan", although certain diacritics are employed in only some of the languages, and are apparently not merely decorative in purpose. Notably, the Colán list uses numerous diacritics, whereas the Catacaos list has almost none. This may be due to the vocabularies collected by different authors.

==== Wordlist ====
(M) indicates a reading of the Madrid list, and (B) indicates the Bogotá list.

Colán wordlist
gloss	Colán
god	tios̃
man	yatã(-)dlam
woman	pir-n (M) / pi-m (B)
soul	alma
body	cuerpo
heart	ñessini-m
meat/flesh	carne
bone	dladlapi(-)rãm (M) / dladlape(-)rãm (B)
father	ma-m̃
mother	nũn (M) / nuñ (B) (?)
son	hicu-m̃
daughter	hicu-m̃
brother	pua-m̃
sister	puru-m̃
eat	aguã
drink	cũ-m (M) / cum̃ (B) (?)
laugh	chañar
cry	nãr (M) / ñãr (B) (?)
die	dlacati
joy	chagasiñ
pain	masic
death	dlacati
sky	cutũc-nap
sun	turi-nap
moon	nag
stars	chupuchup
fire	huỹur
wind	cuiat ñap (M) / cuiat ñag (B)
bird	yaiau
earth	dlurũm
animal	animal
tree	arbol
trunk	tũcu-rãm (M) / tùcu-ram̃ (B) (?)
branch	yabi-ti(-)ram (M) / yabmram (B) (?)
flower	flor
fruit	fruto
grass	agua-col
water	yũp
sea	amum
river	yũp
waves	llam(-)as
rain	nug̃
fish	llas
