= Híbito language =

Extinct Hibito-Cholon language of Peru

Híbito
- Xibitoana
- Native to: Peru
- Region: Bombanaje River valley
- Ethnicity: Hibito
- Extinct: late 1990s, with the death of Natividad Grández del Castillo
- Language family: Hibito–Cholon: Híbito

Language codes
- ISO 639-3: hib
- Glottolog: hibi1243
- Linguasphere: 84-DAA-aa

Híbito (Xibitoana) is a poorly attested, extinct language formerly spoken by the Híbito people along the Bombanaje, Jelache, and Huayabamba rivers, tributaries of the Huallaga River in northern Peru. The last speaker, Natividad Grández del Castillo, died between 1996 and 2000.

== Documentation ==
The first known documentation of Híbito was made in 1676 by the Franciscan missionary Joseph de Araujo, who is said to have written a grammar, vocabulary and catechism in the language; however, these documents have not been found.

== Vocabulary ==
=== The "plan" of Martínez Compañón ===
The Plan of Martínez Compañón

Hibito is attested in a 43-word list in a document referred to as the "plan" collected by Bishop of Trujillo Baltasar Jaime Martínez Compañón between 1782 and 1785. The "plan" is part of a larger work, known as the Codex Martínez Compañón, detailing life in colonial Peru. Notably, the work also contains a number of watercolors, which were captioned by Martínez Compañón's personal secretary Pedro Agustín de Echevarri, who presumably also wrote down the "plan".

There are two copies of the "plan", one held in Bogotá and the other in Madrid. Both copies include 43-word lists for the Quechua, Mochica (Yunga), Sechura, Colán, Catacaos, Culli, Hibito and Cholón languages, as well as Spanish. The Colán and Catacaos languages are generally subsumed under the name Tallán, and they are closely related, probably dialects of a single language. The two versions of the "plan" have certain differences from each other, particularly in the spelling of the transcriptions.

A number of diacritics are employed in the vocabularies. Their meaning is not elaborated upon in the "plan", although certain diacritics are employed in only some of the languages, and are apparently not merely decorative in purpose.

The following wordlist is of the Madrid version of the manuscript.

Híbito wordlist
gloss	Híbito
god	dioschu
man	nuum
woman	etlec
soul	animachu
body	asacpzi
heart	thuo-suic
meat/flesh	amaà
bone	chepce
father	cotc
mother	queec
son	pool
daughter	ñoo
brother	moscaá
sister	moscaá
eat	lop̄quem
drink	vvic
laugh	coɥam
cry	atzacquem
die	calguesquim
joy	musug vem
pain	calac
death	huanc
sky	puxam
sun	ñim
moon	cuiñá
stars	cuichas
fire	ucche
wind	coctom
bird	cumcoc̓hi
earth	caloch
animal	animal
tree	mixs
trunk	sangoch
branch	mixnul
flower	chucchum
fruit	llagna
grass	quiac
water	cachi
sea	lapomcachi
river	cecllutcachi
waves	omium
rain	laamchus
fish	cazop

=== Tessmann (1930) ===
Híbito wordlist
gloss	Híbito
black	utsálmana
canoe	jat
cassava	tsö̲̆
chicken	ūdšpa
crocodile	šontí
dog	šu’
ear	otšī, otšji
earth	puts
eye	montsá, mantsá
fire	olho, utšj
hand	nūl
head	sótša
house	īp
jaguar	tšāla
maize	ántsa
man	nūm, nun
moon	winžö
one	etsí
plant	palónta
red	mútsmana
saucepan	tsehē
stick	mitš
stone	tšē
sun	nim, nijm
tapir	satšauaa̯
three	útsi
tobacco	pēs
tongue	moaltsŭ, malsu
tooth	dzuī, tui
two	optšē
water	otšj
white	utsūtš, atsutš
woman	udū, alū

=== Recent fieldwork ===
The following data for Híbito were taken from Aurelia Gutiérrez Cerqueira, of Cholón descent.

Híbito wordlist
gloss	Híbito
kind of fish	[alkusew]
medicinal plant against rheumatism	[ˈkoʃwe]
kind of fish	[kotokcik]
eyes	[ɲawli]
mountain pass	[paˈlanca]
carrier bag with four sticks to carry a baby	[ˈpeyne]
'Hail, woman!'	[muˈɉuŋ hila]!

A phrase is also glossed below:

anˈe anˈe boro-kte-k ˈmon-te ki-la-kte-ˈɉo
INTJ INTJ make.love-INF-ANT forest-ADESS 1PL.SBJ-go-FUT-EXCLM
‘Let’s go to the forest to make love!’
