= Catacao dialect =

Extinct language of Peru

Catacao
- Katakao
- Native to: Peru
- Region: Piura Region
- Ethnicity: Catacáos
- Extinct: by 1864
- Language family: Sechura–Catacao?: Tallán; Catacao

Language codes
- ISO 639-3: –
- Glottolog: cata1293
- Linguasphere: 84-CAA-aa
- Map of Catacaoan languages. Catacao is at the bottom of the yellow area.

Catacao is an extinct dialect of Tallán, a language isolate once spoken in the Department of Piura in Peru. It is attested solely from a wordlist recorded by Bishop of Trujillo Baltasar Jaime Martínez Compañón in the 1780s.

== Vocabulary ==
=== Earlier works ===
Around 1596, Bishop of Quito Luis López de Solís commissioned catechisms and grammars to be written for the Indigenous languages of his diocesis, including "la lengua […] tallana", but it is uncertain if these works were ever produced.

=== The "plan" of Martínez Compañón ===
Catacao is known entirely from a 43-word list in a document referred to as the "plan" collected by Martínez Compañón between 1782 and 1785. The "plan" is part of a larger work, known as the Codex Martínez Compañón, detailing life in colonial Peru. Notably, the work also contains a number of watercolors, which were captioned by Martínez Compañón's personal secretary Pedro Agustín de Echevarri, who presumably also wrote down the "plan".

There are two copies of the "plan", one held in Bogotá and the other in Madrid. Both copies include 43-word lists for the Quechua, Mochica (Yunga), Sechura, Colán, Catacaos, Culli, Hibito and Cholón languages, as well as Spanish. The Colán and Catacaos languages are generally subsumed under the name Tallán, and they are closely related, probably dialects of a single language. The two versions of the "plan" have certain differences from each other, particularly in the spelling of the transcriptions.

A number of diacritics are employed in the vocabularies. Their meaning is not elaborated upon in the "plan", although certain diacritics are employed in only some of the languages, and are apparently not merely decorative in purpose. Notably, the Colán list uses numerous diacritics, whereas the Catacaos list has almost none. This may be due to the vocabularies collected by different authors.

==== Wordlist ====
(M) indicates a reading of the Madrid list, and (B) indicates the Bogotá list.

Catacao wordlist
gloss	Catacao
god	thios
man	aszat
woman	pi-chi(-)m
soul	alma
body	cuerpo
heart	ñiesiñi-chi(-)m
meat/flesh	ccol
bone	lalape(-)chen
father	pateri
mother	ni-chi(-)m
son	ycu-chi(-)m
daughter	ycu-chi(-)m capuc
brother	pua-chi(-)m
sister	puru-chi(-)m
eat	agua-chi(-)m
drink	conecuc
laugh	chañac
cry	ñar-acñaquitutin
die	lacatu
joy	gozo
pain	masic
death	ynatac-lacatu
sky	cielo
sun	nap
moon	nam
stars	estrellas
fire	guanararac
wind	vic
bird	yeya
earth	durum
animal	animal
tree	chigua(-)sam
trunk	tucci-càs
branch	yabi-que
flower	alhuaca
fruit	cosecha-m
grass	t(-)agua-col
water	yup
sea	amaun
river	turu-yup
waves	olas
rain	guayaquinum / guaraquinum (?)
fish	llas
