= Yarlequé =

Yarlequé is a surname derived from yarlec aquec which means scoffer in the Tallán Quechuan language.
