= Sechuran =

Sechura may be,

- Sechura language
- Sechuran fox
