= Yunga language =

Yunga may refer to either of the following two languages:

- Yunga language (Peru)
- Yunga language (Australia)
