= Mochica language =

Extinct and revived language isolate of Peru

Mochica
- Yunga
- Muchic, Ed muchik
- Native to: Peru
- Region: Lambayeque Region: Motupe Valley, La Leche Valley, Lambayeque Valley and Zaña Valley. La Libertad Region: Jequetepeque Valley and Chicama Valley.
- Ethnicity: Sican culture Mochicas
- Extinct: c. 1920 fully in 1995, with the death of Simón Quesquén
- Revival: 80 teachers (2018)
- Language family: Language isolate

Language codes
- ISO 639-3: omc
- Glottolog: moch1259
- Linguasphere: 84-AAB-aa
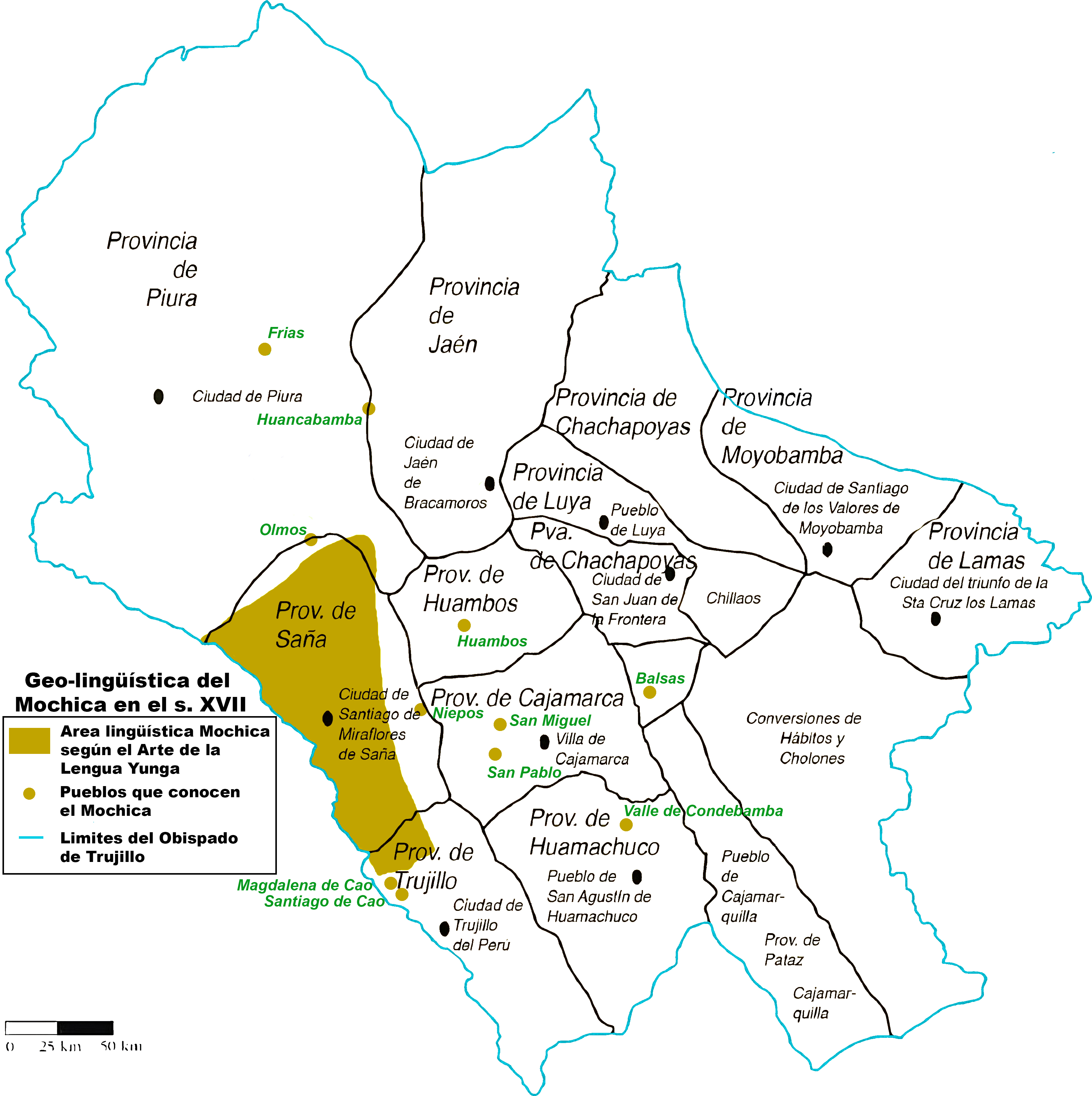
- Distribution of the Mochica language according to the Art of the Yunga language

- Mochica is classified as Extinct by the UNESCO Atlas of the World's Languages in Danger.

Mochica (Yunga, Mochica: Muchic, Modern Mochica: Ed muchik) is an extinct and revived language isolate formerly spoken by the Moche and Sican cultures in the departments of Lambayeque and La Libertad, along the Peruvian North Coast, until the 1920s. Documented beginning in the 16th century in various colonial and postcolonial sources, Mochica is characterized by its primarily synthetic morphology, a distinctive consonant system, particularly with its laterals, clitic- rather than affix-based morphosyntax, case stacking, and numeral classifiers derived from nouns. In recent times, there have been initiatives to revive the language, such as teaching it in schools and creating modern learning resources for Mochica.

== History ==
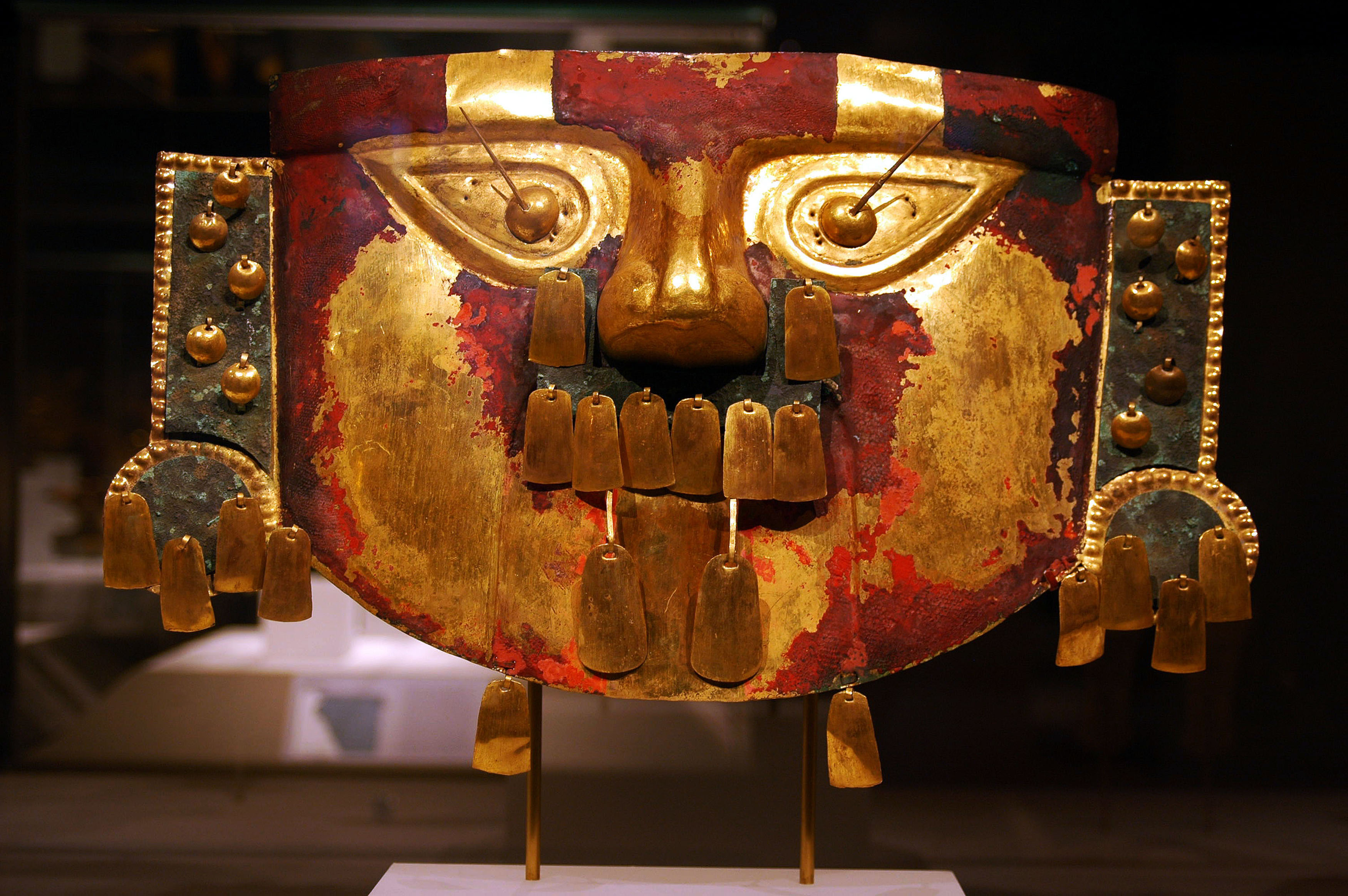
Funerary mask from Batán Grande (Sican culture).

=== Language contact ===
Jolkesky (2016) notes that there are lexical similarities with the Trumai, Arawak, Kandoshi, Muniche, Barbakoa, Cholon-Hibito, Kechua, Mapudungun, Kanichana, and Kunza language families due to contact, also suggesting that similarities with Amazonian languages may be due to the early migration of Mochica speakers down the Marañón and Solimões.

=== Documentation ===
==== Colonial-era texts ====
The earliest published documentation of Mochica dates back to 1607 in Rituale seu Manuale Peruanum (1607), written by Franciscan friar Luis Jerónimo de Oré (missionary, polyglot, later bishop of Concepción in Chile), containing some Mochica sentences of unknown origin. However, a 1582 manuscript believed to be hosted at the Archiepiscopal Archive of Trujillo titled Gobierno de los situmas antes de los señores yngas comenzasen a reinar, y trata quienes fueron y mandaron en aqueste valle, Cañaribamba purported to contain information in Cañari, an extinct and poorly known language of Ecuador, has Mochica texts which were copied and published elsewhere but assumed to be of Cañari origin. Following that, in 1644, the diocesan priest and parish vicar of Reque Fernando de la Carrera Daza published the Arte de la lengua yunga ('Art of the Yunga Language'), the only known colonial grammar of this language, is one of the primary sources of data on Mochica, including a descriptive grammar, religious texts, and general information about the Lambayeque region. A document known as the "plan" of Bishop of Trujillo Baltasar Jaime Martínez Compañón in his Codex Martínez Compañón, a general account of life in 18th-century Peru, contains a 43-word list in Mochica.

==== 19th-20th century texts ====
Towards the end of Mochica's existence as a native language in the 19th century, various scholars such as Adolf Bastian, the German physician and philologist Ernst W. Middendorf, Walter Lehmann, Federico Villarreal, and Hans Heinrich Brüning documented Mochica, most notably Middendorf, who authored the other primary source on Mochica, a grammar incorporating some elements of Carrera's work, but also some new content.

==== Salvage documentation ====
Following the death of the last fluent speakers, a number of new sources of documentation were published, by Konrad Huber (1953), who collected data from 1943–47, also including an unpublished wordlist by Rafael Quesquén, Jorge Zevallos Quiñones (1941, 1946), and Paul Kosok (1965), whose wordlist contains a large amount of errors. Finally, the last rememberer of Mochica, Simón Quesquén (1918-1995), one of Rafael's sons, had recordings made of his speech in Mochica in 1974, the only ones known in existence.

== Names ==
Colonial sources record several designations for the language now generally known as Mochica: Yunga, Mochica, Muchic/Muchik, and occasional appellatives such as Pescadora.

Oré's Rituale refers to the "Mochica" language and also uses the phrase Mochica de los Yungas ('Mochica of the Yungas'). In the latter case, he seems to distinguish between the language itself – called Mochica – and the northern peoples – called Yungas. At the time Yunga was employed not only as a geographic and climatic term, derived from the Quechua exonym yunka 'warm area', but also to refer to the Mochica as an ethnic group. Carrera's Arte also consistently uses the exonym Yunga.

The Augustinian friar Antonio de la Calancha employed the form Muchic in his Crónica moralizadora (1638). In the 19th century, Middendorf revived that variant and disseminated it as Muchik in works such as Das Muchik oder die Chimu-Sprache (1892). He also identified the language with that of the Chimú, partly because Quingnam (the actual language of the Chimú kingdom) was at that time unknown to scholars, whereas colonial references and traces of Mochica still existed. Furthermore, nineteenth-century archaeology often grouped Sicán and Moche material into stages labeled "proto-Chimú" or "early Chimú", which reinforced the misattribution. Later archaeological and linguistic research clarified these associations and dissociated Quingnam from Mochica.

Today, Mochica remains the most widely used term in academic literature, while some revitalization projects prefer Muchik, taken from colonial and 19th-century sources.

== Classification ==
Mochica is classified as a language isolate by virtually all modern sources on the language. An exception is Stark (1968, 1972), which groups Mochica (Yunga) with Uru–Chipaya and Mayan using the comparative method. This hypothesis, however, has not been received well among the linguistic community.

== Geographic distribution ==
According to the list of the vicar of Reque and author of the aforementioned Art, Fernando de la Carrera, the peoples who in 1644 spoke the Mochica language were as follows:

- In the corregimiento of Trujillo: Santiago, Magdalena de Cao, Chocope, Chicama valley, Paiján.
- In the corregimiento of Saña: San Pedro de Lloc, Chepén, Jequetepeque, Guadalupe, Pueblo Nuevo, Etén, Chiclayo, San Miguel, Santa Lucía, Parish of Saña, Lambayeque with four rooms, Reque, Monsefú, Ferreñafe, Túcume, Illimo, Pacora, Mórrope and Jayanca.
- In the corregimiento of Piura: Motupe, Salas (annex of Penachi), Copis (annex of Olmos), Frías and Huancabamba.
- In the corregimiento of Cajamarca: Santa Cruz, San Miguel de la Sierra, Ñopos, San Pablo, the doctrine of the rafts of the Marañón, a bias of Cajamarca, Cachén, Guambos and many other places in the Cajamarca mountain range, such as the Condebamba valley.

== Revival ==
The Cultural Office of the district of Mórrope has launched a program to teach the Mochica language in an effort to preserve the region’s ancient cultural legacy. The initiative has been well received by local residents and adopted by numerous schools. Additional cultural activities, such as the crafting of ceramics and decorated gourds (mates), have also been introduced as part of the revitalization effort.

Previously considered a dead language, Mochica is now taught in 38 schools and has around 80 teachers.

== Phonology and orthography ==
The sounds of Mochica are not known with certainty due to the differing transcriptions used by different authors. In addition, the two primary sources on Mochica were recorded over 200 years apart, with significant phonetic changes having occurred during that time.

=== Vowels ===
==== Carrera Daza (1644) ====
Carrera Daza distinguishes six vowels in Mochica, represented as ⟨a, e, i, o, u, æ⟩, with the latter sometimes being written as ⟨œ⟩ in different editions of his grammar. This vowel is characterized as "begin[ning] as an e and end[ing] as a u, in such a way that there are two vowels in one". A diacritic is used to indicate length, though it is mainly restricted to a few roots (ûtzh 'big') and the ending -ô, used in the genitive construction.

The letter ⟨i⟩ is sometimes used as a palatalization marker by Carrera Daza (e.g. ñaiñ /nʲanʲ/ 'bird' or çio /sʲo/ 'he, it'), and diphthongs did not occur in the Mochica of his time.

==== Middendorf (1892) ====
In contrast, Middendorf recognizes 17 vowels, including 11 plain vowels, two "impure" vowels, written as ⟨ů⟩ and ⟨ä⟩, and four diphthongs. Middendorf admits that he was never able to correctly pronounce the impure vowels, but characterizes them similarly to the ⟨æ⟩ of Carrera Daza. ⟨ä⟩ is described with a very fleeting u sound, such that in rapid speech it would sound similar to [ɛ] or [e]. ⟨ů⟩ is described as reminiscent of the diphthong /aʊ/.

==== The sixth vowel ====
The vowel represented by ⟨æ⟩ is hotly debated in the field of Mochica studies. As no sound recordings of Mochica exist, and because the existing descriptions are rather vague, the true phonetic value cannot be discerned and any interpretations remain completely hypothetical. One hypothesis is that the sixth vowel was /ɨ/, commonly found in Amazonian languages. Other hypotheses have given realizations of [ɵ, ø, ʉ, ɘʊ, ɘ, œy̯] and [ǝ].

==== Comparison ====
A comparison table of the vowels as written in Carrera Daza and Middendorf is given below.

Carrera Daza	a, â	e	i	o, ô	u, û	œ/æ
Middendorf	a, ā, ă	e (ē)	ī, (i), ĭ	ō, (o), ŏ	u, ū, ŭ	ä, ů

==== Table ====
Thus, a vowel system of Mochica would resemble the table below:

	Front		Central		Back	
	short	long	short	long	short	long
Close	i	iː	ɨ ~ ə ⟨æ, œ⟩		u	uː
Mid	e	(eː)	ɨ ~ ə ⟨æ, œ⟩		o	oː
Open			a	aː		

=== Consonants ===
The orthography used for Spanish at the time of the writing of Carrera's grammar was very chaotic and inconsistent. One may therefore never be quite sure on the nature of consonants, especially sibilants, in Spanish colonial texts of the time.

==== Sibilants ====
The symbols used to represent Mochica sibilants in Carrera (1644) are ⟨ç/z, s, x⟩ and ⟨ss⟩. The grapheme ⟨x⟩ is described unanimously among Mochica scholars as representing /ʃ/. All but two authors coincide in their description of the phoneme represented by ⟨ç⟩ or ⟨z⟩. The only sources to disagree are Stark (1968), which interprets them both as different allophones of /ʃ/, being [ɕ] and [ʑ] respectively. Hovdhaugen (2004) interprets them as having a palatal pronunciation, which is represented as /sʲ/.

Carrera (1644) explains the distinction between ⟨s⟩ and ⟨ss⟩ as "they ⟨ss⟩ have to be pronounced between them both, hurting on the last one as in ssonto, amoss." The use of "hurting" is derived from Nebrija's Gramática de la lengua castellana, who described consonants and vowels using this definition: "they were called vowels because they have voice by themselves without mixing with other letters, the others were called consonants because they cannot sound without hurting the vowels". Thus, combining the two descriptions, it may be inferred that ⟨ss⟩ "sounded only when the second (last) ⟨s⟩ would affect the contiguous vowel", representing a sound like /s̺/ or /s/.

==== Digraphs and trigraphs ====
Digraphs and trigraphs used in Mochica are ⟨cɥ⟩, ⟨tzh⟩, and ⟨xll⟩. The digraph ⟨cɥ⟩ is derived from a normal ⟨ch⟩ but with the ⟨h⟩ inverted to represent the difference. Middendorf (1892) describes his corresponding sound, written as ⟨c̓h⟩, as similar to the German ⟨tj⟩. Hovdhaugen (2004) interprets it as /ʈ͡ʂ/, Stark (1968) as /t̠ʲ/, Torero (1997, 2002) as /kʲ/, Eloranta (2013) and Michael et al. (2015) as /c/, Cerrón-Palomino (1995) as /ʨ/ and Adelaar as /tʲ/.

The trigraph ⟨tzh⟩ is described as representing a sound difficult to pronounce by Carrera: "These [words] one pronounces starting with T, hurting on the Z and on the vowel, that comes after H, so that it does not say cha but tzha." He further describes the articulation of it as having the "tongue touch[ing] the palate next to the teeth". Middendorf describes it as similar to the German z /͡ts/.

The trigraph ⟨xll⟩ is, according to Carrera, articulated as "[t]he X preceding consonant has to be pronounced hurting between both in a soft way, attaching the tongue to the palate, in such a manner that the sound of the first letter, the vowel, may come out through one side and the other of the mouth". Stark (1968) identifies this sound as /ɕʲ/, Torero (2002) as a voiceless post-palatal lateral fricative /𝼆̠/, Hovdhaugen (2004, 2005) as /ʂ/, Adelaar (2004) as /ɬʲ/, and Salas, Eloranta and Michael et al. (2015) as /ɬ/.

==== Other consonants ====
The following consonants are unanimously agreed upon by all sources:

- voiceless plosives /p/, /t/, /k/; /ʈ/ is added by Hovdhaugen to represent the digraph ⟨tr⟩
- voiced plosive /d/, also interpreted as /ð/ by Adelaar and Hovdhaugen, and /d̪/ by Stark
- nasals /m/, /n/, /ɲ/, /ŋ/, though /ɲ/ is replaced by a pre-palatal nasal by Torero (2002)
- the rhotic /r/, an alveolar trill; a tap /ɾ/ is also added by Stark and Cerrón-Palomino
- a labial fricative, either /ɸ/ or /f/
- the palatal glide /j/
- the postalveolar fricative /ʃ/, although /çʲ/ is also given by Stark as an alternative to represent the grapheme ⟨x⟩
- the postalveolar affricate /tʃ/, which is replaced by Stark with /tɕ/
- the laterals /l/ and /ʎ/; Torero adds /ɭ/ and interprets /ʎ/ as pre-palatal. /l/ shifted to [x] around the 18th and 19th centuries.

==== Table ====
Michael et al. (2015) summarize their interpretations of Mochica in the following table.

	Bilabial	Labiodental	Dental	Alveolar	Post- alveolar	Palatal	Velar
Plosive	p			t		tʲ	k
Affricate				ts	tʃ		
Fricative		f	ð	s s̺	ʃ	sʲ	
Nasal	m			n		ɲ	ŋ
Trill				r			
Lateral				ɬ l		ʎ	
Approximant						j	

=== Comparison ===
A comparison of various interpretations for the letters is given below.

Arte (Carrera 1644)	Stark (1968)	Cerrón-Palomino (1995)	Torero (2002)	Salas (2002)	Hovdhaugen (2004, 2005)	Adelaar ([2004] 2007)	Eloranta (2013)	SAPhon (2015)
a	a, aː	a, aː	a	a	a	a, aː	a, aː	a, aː
e	e	e	e	e	e	e, eː	e, eː	e
i	i	i, iː	i	i	i	i, iː	i, iː	i, iː
o	o, oː	o, oː	o	o	o	o, oː	o, oː	o, oː
u	u, uː	u, uː	u	u	u	u, uː	u, uː	u, uː
æ	ɵ	ø	ʉ	ɘʊ	ɘ	ə, œy̯	ɨ	ɨ
c, qu	k	k	k	k	k	k	k	k
ç, z	ɕ, ʑ	s	s	s	sʲ	s	s	s
ch	t͡ɕ	t͡ʃ	t͡ʃ	t͡ʃ	t͡ʃ	t͡ʃ	t͡ʃ	t͡ʃ
cɥ	t̲ʲ	t͡ɕ	kʲ	tʲ	tʂ	tʲ ~ tç	c	c
d	d̪	d	d	d	ð	ð ~ θ	d	d
f	f	ɸ	f	f	f	f ~ ɸ	ɸ	f
l	l	l	l ~ ɭ	l	l	l ~ ɬ	l	l
ll	ʎ	ʎ	lʲ	ʎ	ʎ	lʲ	ʎ	ʎ
m	m	m	m	m	m	m	m	m
n	n	n	n	n	n	n	n	n
ñ	ɲ	ɲ	ɲ	ɲ	ɲ	ɲ	ɲ	ɲ
ng	ŋ	ŋ	ŋ	ŋ	ŋ	ŋ	ŋ	ŋ
p	p	p	p	p	p	p	p	p
r, rr	ɾ ~ r	ɾ ~ r	r	r	r	ɾ ~ r	r	r
s, ss	z ~ s	ʂ	s̺	ʂ	s	s̺	s̺	ʂ
t	t	t	t	t	t	t	t	t
tr	—	—	—	—	ʈ	—	—	—
tzh	t͡s	t͡s	t͡s ~ tʲ	t͡s	t͡sʲ	tᶳ ~ tˢ	t͡s	t͡s
v	u	u	u	u	u	u	u	u
x	ʃ	ʃ	ʃ	ʃ	ʃ	ʃ	ʃ	ʃ
xll	ɕʲ	ɬ	ʎ̝̊	ɬ	ʂ	ɬʲ	ɬ	ɬ
y, j, i	j	j	j	j	j	j	j	j

== Typology ==
Mochica is typologically different from the other main languages on the west coast of South America, namely Quechuan, Aymara, and Mapudungun. Further, it contains rare features such as:

- a case system in which cases are built on each other in a linear sequence; for example, the ablative case suffix is added to the locative case, which in turn is added to an oblique case form;
- all nouns have two stems, possessed and non-possessed;
- an agentive case suffix used mainly for the agent in passive clauses; and
- a verbal system in which all finite forms are formed with the copula.

== Morphology ==
Some suffixes in Mochica as reconstituted by Hovdhaugen (2004):

- sequential suffix: -top
- purpose suffix: -næm
- gerund suffixes: -læc and -ssæc
- gerund suffix: -(æ)zcæf
- gerund suffix: -(æ)d

=== Nouns ===
==== Possession ====
Mochica maintains a distinction between inalienable and alienable possession. Inalienable nouns are divided into three noun subclasses, and alienable nouns into two, which can be distinguished from each other by their possesive prefixes. The former require a suffix when not possessed, and do not have a suffix when possessed. Some examples of these nouns are given below.

gloss	non-possessed noun	possessed noun
'lord'	çiequic	çiec
'father'	efquic	ef
'son'	eizquic	eiz
'nostrils'	fænquic	fon
'eyes'	lucɥquic	locɥ
'soul'	moixquic	moix
'hand'	mæcɥquic	mæcɥ
'farm'	uizquic	uiz
'bread, food'	xllonquic	xllon
'head'	falpic	falpæng
'leg'	tonic	tonæng
'human flesh'	ærquic	ærqueng
'ear' (but med in medec 'in the ears')	medquic	medeng
'belly, heart' (pol and polæng appear to be equivalents)	polquic	polæng / pol
'lawyer'	capæcnencæpæc	capæcnencæpcæss
'heaven'	cuçia	cuçias
'dog'	fanu	fanuss
'duck'	fellu	felluss
'servant'	yana	ianass
'sin'	ixll	ixllæss
'ribbon'	llaftu	llaftuss
'horse/llama'	col	colæd
'fish'	xllac	xllacæd
'(silver) money'	xllaxll	xllaxllæd
'maize'	mang	mangæ
'ceiling'	cɥap	cɥapæn
'creator'	chicopæc	chicopæcæss
'sleeping blanket'	cunuc	cunur
'chair' (< fel 'to sit')	filuc	filur
'cup' (< man 'to drink, to eat')	manic	manir
'toy' (< ñe(i)ñ 'to play')	ñeñuc	ñeñur

== Lexicon ==
=== Nouns ===
Locative forms of Mochica nouns:

noun stem	locative form
fon 'nostrils'	funæc 'in the nostrils'
loc 'foot'	lucæc 'on the feet'
ssol 'forehead'	ssulæc 'in the forehead'
locɥ 'eye'	lucɥæc 'in the eyes'
mæcɥ 'hand'	mæcɥæc 'in the hand'
far 'holiday'	farræc 'on holidays'
olecɥ 'outside'	olecɥæc 'outside'
ssap 'mouth'	ssapæc 'in the mouth'
lecɥ 'head'	lecɥæc 'on the head'
an 'house'	enec 'in the house'
med 'ear'	medec 'in the ears'
neiz 'night'	ñeizac 'in the nights'
xllang 'sun'	xllangic 'in the sun'

=== Classifiers ===
Numeral classifiers in Mochica:

quantifier	meaning and semantic categories
felæp	pair (counting birds, jugs, etc.)
luc	pair (counting plates, drinking vessels, cucumbers, fruits)
cɥo(quixll)	ten (counting fruits, ears of corn, etc.)
cæss	ten (counting days)
pong	ten (counting fruits, cobs, etc.)
ssop	ten (counting people, cattle, reed, etc., i.e. everything that is not money, fruits, and days)
chiæng	hundred (counting fruits, etc.)

=== Numerals ===
Mochica numerals:

Numeral	Mochica of Carrera	Mochica of Middendorf
1	onæc, na-	onäk
2	aput, atput, pac-	aput
3	çopæt, çoc-	sopät
4	nopæt, noc-	nopät
5	exllmætzh	ej̓mäts (ešllmäts)
6	tzhaxlltzha	tsaitsa (tsašlltsa)
7	ñite	ñite
8	langæss	langäss
9	tap	tap
10	çiæcɥ, -pong, ssop, -fælæp, -cɥoquixll (Note: The last four are classifiers as listed above.)	na-pong, na-ssop
20	pacpong, pacssop, etc.	pak pong, pak ssop
30	çocpong, çocssop, etc.	sok pong, sok ssop
40	nocpong, nocssop, etc.	nok pong, nok ssop
50	exllmætzhpong, exllmætzhssop, etc.	ej̓mäts pong, ej̓mäts ssop
60	tzhaxlltzhapong, tzhaxlltzhassop, etc.	tsaitsa pong, tsaitsa ssop
70	ñitepong, ñitessop, etc.	ñite pong, ñite ssop
80	langæsspong, langæssop, etc.	langäss pong, langäss ssop
90	tappong, tapssong, etc.	tap pong, tap ssop
100	palæc	na paläk
1000	cunô	na-kunō

=== The "plan" of Martínez Compañón ===
Mochica is attested in a 43-word list in a document referred to as the "plan" collected by Martínez Compañón between 1782 and 1785. The "plan" is part of a larger work, known as the Codex Martínez Compañón, detailing life in colonial Peru. The work also contains a number of watercolors, which were captioned by Martínez Compañón's personal secretary Pedro Agustín de Echevarri, who presumably also wrote down the "plan".

There are two copies of the "plan", one held in Bogotá and the other in Madrid. Both copies include 43-word lists for the Quechua, Mochica (Yunga), Sechura, Colán, Catacaos, Culli, Hibito and Cholón languages, as well as Spanish. The Colán and Catacaos languages are generally subsumed under the name Tallán, and they are closely related, probably dialects of a single language. The two versions of the "plan" have certain differences from each other, particularly in the spelling of the transcriptions.

A number of diacritics are employed in the vocabularies. Their meaning is not elaborated upon in the "plan", although certain diacritics are employed in only some of the languages, and are apparently not merely decorative in purpose.

The following wordlist is of the Madrid version of the manuscript.

Mochica wordlist
gloss	Mochica
god	yos
man	ñofen
woman	sonen
soul	chepec
body	cuerpo
heart	chê̌tes
meat/flesh	quènĉ̌ho
bone	loti
father	efquic
mother	enquic
son	ezquic
daughter	ezquic
brother	quezmen
sister	quezmen
eat	fenod
drink	maned
laugh	callèd
cry	tamicec
die	limid
joy	ollimquedquid
pain	ronòmcec
death	lemícec
sky	cúcía
sun	hâ̌n
moon	si
stars	chónyic
fire	oĝ̌, ol
wind	couche
bird	ñaíñ
earth	huis
animal	coĝ̌, col
tree	on
trunk	pup
branch	mê̌chen
flower	flor
fruit	fruto
grass	pey
water	lá, gâ̌
sea	ñi
river	nech
waves	olas
rain	oĝ̌
fish	híac

== Sample text ==
=== Tonada del Chimo ===
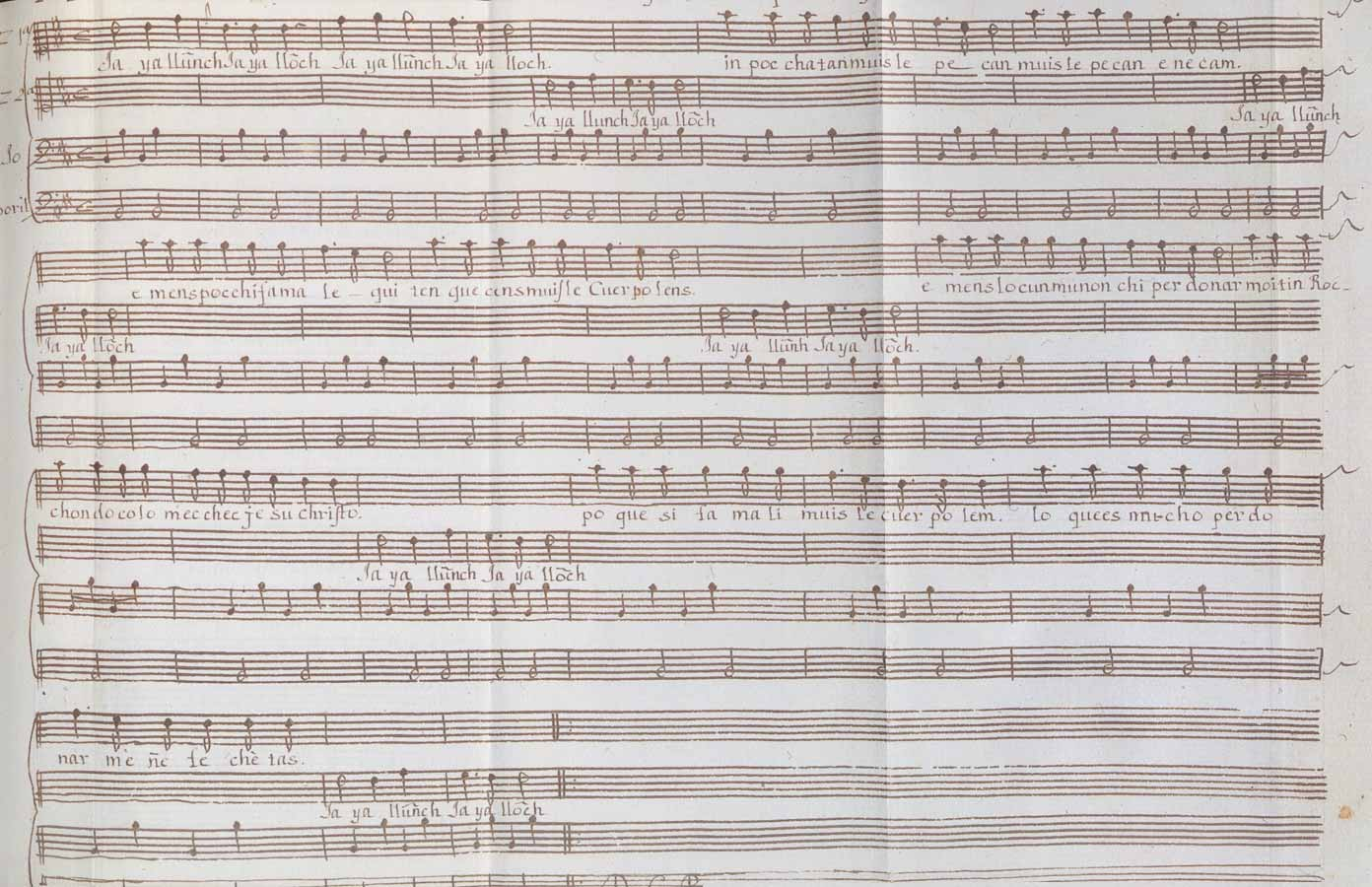
Sheet music for the tonada del chimo.

The only surviving song in the language is a single tonada, Tonada del Chimo, preserved in the Codex Martínez Compañón:

1st voice: Ja ya llũnch, ja ya llõch
Ja ya llũnch, ja ya lloch [sic]
In poc cha tanmuisle pecan muisle pecan e necam

2nd voice: Ja ya llũnch, ja ya llõch
Ja ya llũnch

1st voice: E menspocehifama le qui
ten que consmuiſle Cuerpo lens
e menslocunmunom chi perdonar moitin Roc

2nd voice: Ja ya llõch
Ja ya llũnh,[sic] ja ya llõch

1st voice: Chondocolo mec checje su chriſto
po que si ta mali muis le cuer po[sic] lem.
lo quees aoscho perdonar
me ñe fe che tas

2nd voice: Ja ya llũnch, ja ya llõch
Ja ya llũnch, ja ya llõch

—

A proposed translation is as follows:

'

‘Who calls you asking you to come, has to say: Give (it) to my soul, give (it)

to my soul!’. One has to say it by crying: Give us your love to our soul, with your body! As you say, the Holy Communion means to forgive. The blood of

our Lord Jesus Christ was shed because of me. You have been my father’

'

=== Lord's Prayer ===
The following is the Lord's Prayer in Mochica.

Verse in Matthew 6	Mochica of the "Art of the Yunga Language"	Mochica of the Rituale seu Manuale Peruanum	Mochica of the 1582 manuscript	Mochica of Hervás (1787)	Mochica of Middendorf (1892)	English
9	Mæich ef, acaz loc cuçiang nic, tzhæng oc mang licæm mæcha	Mvchef, acazloc, cuçiagnic, çũq oc licum apmucha,	Maesi, if alas luciedg dic, tzaedg, ol mag lilem maecia	Muchef, acazloo cuzianguic: Zunk oc licum apmucha:	Mäich ef, ak, as lok kusiang-nik, tsäng ok mang likäm mächa	Our Father who art in heaven, Hallowed be thy name.
10	piycan ñof tzhæng cuçias, eiæpmang tzhæng polæng mæn, mo æizi capæc cuçiang nic mæn.	Piycan ñof, çũgcuçias, eyipmãg, çung, poleng, munmo vzicapuc, cuçiangnic mun,	dof tzaedg, eiaepmadg polaeg maed, mu aeisi lapeec liciadgnic meen.	Piican ñof zungcuzias: Eyipmang zung polengmun mo uzicapuc cuzianguic mun.	pīcan ñof tsäng kusiass, eiäp mang tsäng poläng-män, mo uisi-kapäk kusiang-nik-män.	Thy kingdom come. Thy will be done, On earth as it is in heaven.
11	Aio ineng, inengô mæich xllon, piy can ñof allô mo lun.	Ayoyneng. ynengo, much xllon, Piycam ñof allò molun,	Aio ideng, edendu meaici [sic] zllun, pi led ñof ellu mudum.	Ayoineng inengo much sollon piicam ñof allò molun:	Aio ineng inengo mäich j̓on, pīkan ñof allo mo lun.	Give us this day our daily bread;
12	Efque can ñof ixllæss aie aca naix efco xllãg muss eio mæich, çio mæn.	ef quecan ñof. yxllis, acan mux efco. xllang museyo. much çiòmun,	Efquelad ñuf ixlleese aie ala naix eflo xlldg [sic] musseiu maesi.	Ef kecan ñof ixllis acan mux efcò: xllang museyo much ziomun:	Efkekan ñof išlläss aie acan eiš efco j̓angmuse-io mäich, ssiómän.	And forgive us our debts, As we also have forgiven our debtors;
13	Amoz tocæn ñof xllang muss emællæc zær enicnam næm lecɥ nan ef coñof pissin quich	Amus tocum ñof. xllangmuse yz puçèrenic, namnum, les nan, efco, ñof pissin quich	Amuz toceen ñof zlladg mus emaellael zaer eniluam maesi deynem ef loñof quci.	Amus tocum ñof xllangmuse iz puzerenic namnum; Lesnam efcò ñof pissin kich.	Amoss tokan ñof j̓angmuse můillksäre-nik namnäm jechnan efkon ñof pissing-ich.	And lead us not into temptation, But deliver us from evil.
