= -den language =

Nearly unknown extinct language of Peru

-den
- Native to: Peru
- Region: Department of Cajamarca
- Ethnicity: Guzmango
- Extinct: (date missing)
- Language family: unclassified (Hibito–Cholon?)

Language codes
- ISO 639-3: None (mis)
- Glottolog: None
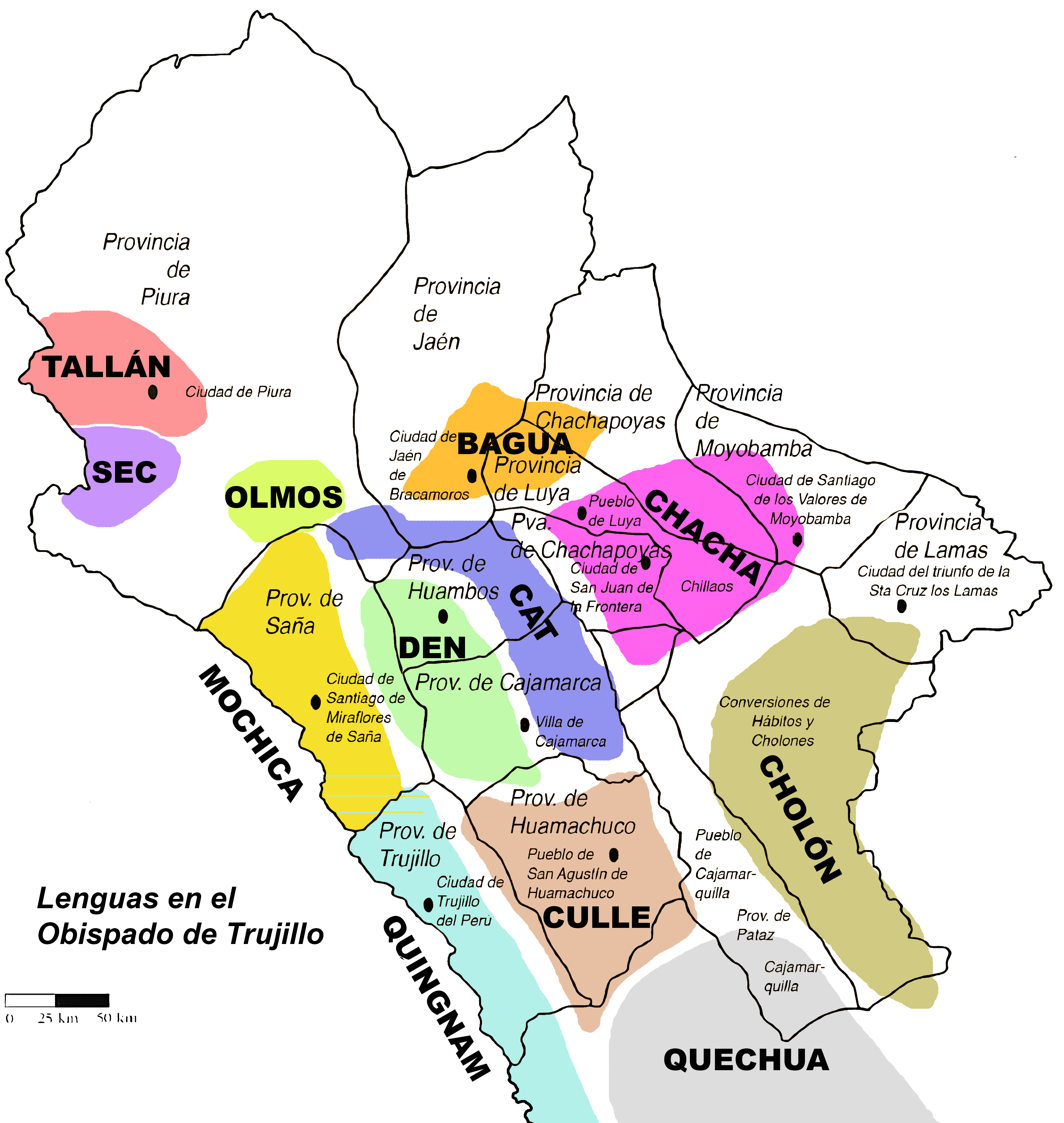
- -den

A virtually unknown and extinct Indigenous language of Peru, formerly spoken in Cajamarca Department, is referred to as -den from its characteristic toponym (also as -don, -ten, -ton, -din, -tin). It is known from only place names and possibly three words and has been associated with the kingdom of Cuismancu (Guzmango), centred in the province of Contumazá. It may have been related to the Hibito–Cholon languages, and may even be identical to other such languages of the region known solely from their distinctive toponyms such as Chachapoya.

== Vocabulary ==
Three words found in a document commissioned by a member of the Cuismancu royal family are attributed to the -den language by Alfredo Torero. These words are ñus 'lady', losque 'young girl', and mizo 'female servant'.

== See also ==
- Chachapoya language
- Culle language
- Extinct languages of the Marañón River basin
