= Sechura language =

Extinct unclassified language of Peru

Sechura
- Sec
- Native to: Peru
- Region: Department of Piura
- Extinct: late 19th century?
- Language family: Sechura–Catacao?: Sechura
- Dialects: Sec; ?Olmos

Language codes
- ISO 639-3: None (mis)
- Glottolog: sech1236
- Linguasphere: 84-BAA-aa
- Sechura

The Sechura language, also known as Sec, is an extinct language spoken in the Department of Piura of Peru, near the port of Sechura. It appears to have become extinct by the beginning of the 20th century. The only documentation is that of an 1863 word list by Richard Spruce, as well as a word list by Bishop Martínez Compañón (1782–1790).

== Classification ==
Sechura is typically considered a language isolate. However, it shows similarities with neighboring Tallán. This was recognized as early in 1924 by Paul Rivet, and also considered by others such as Čestmír Loukotka and Terrence Kaufman. In comparing word lists from Sechura and Tallán, Torero finds six likely cognates between the two:

Tallán		Sechura	
water	xoto	tujut	river
son/daughter	ños-ma	ños-ñi	son/daughter
light	yura	yoro	sun
beach	coyu roro	roro	sea
woman	cucatama	cuctum	woman
fish	xuma	jum	fish

However, Glottolog says the data is not compelling.

== Vocabulary ==
=== The "plan" of Martínez Compañón ===
Sechura is primarily known from a 43-word list in a document referred to as the "plan" collected by Martínez Compañón between 1782 and 1785. The "plan" is part of a larger work, known as the Codex Martínez Compañón, detailing life in colonial Peru. Notably, the work also contains a number of watercolors, which were captioned by Martínez Compañón's personal secretary Pedro Agustín de Echevarri, who presumably also wrote down the "plan".

There are two copies of the "plan", one held in Bogotá and the other in Madrid. Both copies include 43-word lists for the Quechua, Mochica (Yunga), Sechura, Colán, Catacaos, Culli, Hibito and Cholón languages, as well as Spanish. The Colán and Catacaos languages are generally subsumed under the name Tallán, and they are closely related, probably dialects of a single language. The two versions of the "plan" have certain differences from each other, particularly in the spelling of the transcriptions.

A number of diacritics are employed in the vocabularies. Their meaning is not elaborated upon in the "plan", although certain diacritics are employed in only some of the languages, and are apparently not merely decorative in purpose.

==== Wordlist ====
(M) indicates a reading of the Madrid list, and (B) indicates the Bogotá list.

Sechura wordlist
gloss	Sechura
god	dioós
man	su(-)cda (M) / suc(-)cla (B)
woman	cuctum
soul	alma-cchi
body	cuerpo-cchi
heart	chusiopun(-)ma (M) / chusiopun(-)mo (B) (?)
meat/flesh	colt
bone	ruño
father	jàchi (M) / jáchi (B)
mother	ñiña
son	ños-ñi
daughter	ños-ñi
brother	sican-ñi
sister	bapue-ñi (M) / bapuẽ-ni (B)
eat	un-uc
drink	tut-uc
laugh	bus-uc
cry	nic
die	lact-uc
joy	otm-uc
pain	pun-uc
death	lact-uc-no
sky	cuchuc-yor
sun	yò(-)ro
moon	ñang(-)ru (M) / ñanoru (B) (?)
stars	chùpchùp
fire	morot
wind	fic
bird	yaibab
earth	loct
animal	animblà
tree	nusuchu
trunk	fucù (M) / pucù (B) (?)
branch	rama
flower	flor-ac
fruit	fruto
grass	un(-)ñiò-còl (M) / unĩuò-còl (B)
water	tutù
sea	roro
river	tufut
waves	caph
rain	purir (M) / putir (B) (?)
fish	jum

=== Spruce's 1863 wordlist ===
British botanist Richard Spruce collected a wordlist of Sechura in 1863. It was identified as Sechura from comparison with the "plan" of Martínez Compañón.

==== Wordlist ====
Below is Spruce's 1863 word list as transcribed by Matthias Urban (2015). Some transcriptions are uncertain, with alternative transcriptions following semicolons.

gloss	Sechura
man	recla; reda
woman	cucatama
son or daughter	ñosma
dog	tono
hawk	kilkil
serpent	kon’mpar
lizard	ludac; luctac
fish	xuma
head	teuma
stomach	puesa
foot	lava
eye	uchi
nose	chuna
mouth	collo
hearing	tapa; fapa
water	xoto
light	yura
maize	llumash
sweet potato	chapru
road	yuvirma
come here!	xoroc tima; xoroc tema
be quiet!	neshi
come along	uchan; uchau
no	shushca
yes	yé
turkey, buzzard	roncho
beach	coyu roro
cotton	sono; suno
devil	ñash
good day	amatioo
how are you?	ubrun Cuma
face	re
sea	taholma
pot	pillacala
father in law	ratichma; rutichma
mother in law	naminma
where is your husband?	xamanmi recla
here it is	cha
