= Hibito–Cholon languages =

Proposed language family of Peru

Híbito–Cholón
- Cholónan
- (tentative)
- Geographic distribution: Peru
- Extinct: late 1990s, with the death of Natividad Grández del Castillo (Híbito) >2 rememberers (2021)
- Linguistic classification: Proposed language family
- Subdivisions: Híbito †; Cholón (†); ? Chachapoya †; ? Chirino †; ? Copallén †; ? Culle †; ? -den †

Language codes
- Linguasphere: 84-D
- Glottolog: hibi1242

The moribund or extinct Híbito–Cholón or Cholónan languages form a proposed and widely accepted language family that links two languages of Peru, Hibito and Cholón. This family was believed have gone extinct in the 1990s, but in 2021 a semispeaker was identified; she is Martha Pérez Valderrama, and she is currently the only known speaker of this language family (specifically from the Cholón). They may also be related to the extinct Culle and Chirino languages, and perhaps to the language of the Chachapoya, but the data for all of these languages is poor. This hypothetical group of languages has been termed the Cholonoid languages.

== Language contact ==
Jolkesky (2016) notes that there are lexical similarities with the Kechua, Leko, Mapudungun, Mochika, Kandoshi, Muniche, and Barbakoa language families due to contact.

== Lexicon ==
Several basic Hibito and Cholon words appear to be related, though the data on both languages is poor. The following examples are given in the ad hoc orthography of the three sources we have on these languages:

gloss	tree	water	daughter	son
Cholón	mech / meš	cot / quõt / köta	ñu / -ñu	pul / -pul
Hibito	mixs / mitš	cachi / otšj	ñoo	pool

English gloss (translated)	Hibito		Cholon	comparisons
English gloss (translated)	Martínez Compañón	Tessmann	Cholon	comparisons
animal	animal		(Sp.)	
tree	mixs		mees-ñgup	
drink	vvic		nig	
sky	puxam		senta	
heart	thuo-suic		aluñač	
God	dioschu		(Sp.)	
pain	calac		ysiam	
water	cachi	otšj	kot	Tessmann: oč, köta
stars	cuichas		ke-nak	
woman	etlec	udū, alū	yla	Tessmann: udú, hilá
fire	ucche	olho, utšj	vet	Tessmann: olmó, utmo
daughter	ñoo		añu	
son	pool		apul	
flower	chucchum		ñuñap	
river	cecllutcachi		kot-ysokot	
brother	moscaá		azot	Katakao: aszat 'man'
fruit	llagna		keniya	
joy	musug vem		augilubaktam	
grass	quiac		pullo	
man	nuum	nūm, nun	num	Tessmann: núm, lúno
moon	cuiñá	winžö	peel	Tessmann: winžö, pel
eat	lop̄quem		amok	
sea	lapomcachi		sokotlol	
mother	queec		appan	
death	huanc		mikol	
die	calguesquim		ñgoli-čo	
bird	cumcoc̓hi		zuksill	
waves	omium		ypixsimam	
father	cotc		appa	
cry	atzacquem		yo-yam	
rain	laamchus		llisiak	
fish	cazop		asua	
branch	mixnul		pučup	
laugh	coɥam		časam	
sister	moscaá		akiñiu	
sun	ñim	nim, nijm	musak	Tessmann: nim, mušápo
earth	caloch		lluspey	
trunk	sangoch		sangoč	
wind	coctom		mam	
meat	amaà		čep	

=== Rivet (1949) ===
Hibito and Cholon words
French gloss	English translation	Hibito	Cholon
J'achète	I buy		a-msan
J'ai achète	I bought		a-mzi
Aiguille	Needle		kaxá
Aimer	to love		a-gol'an
