= Cachua =

Latin-American baroque dance form

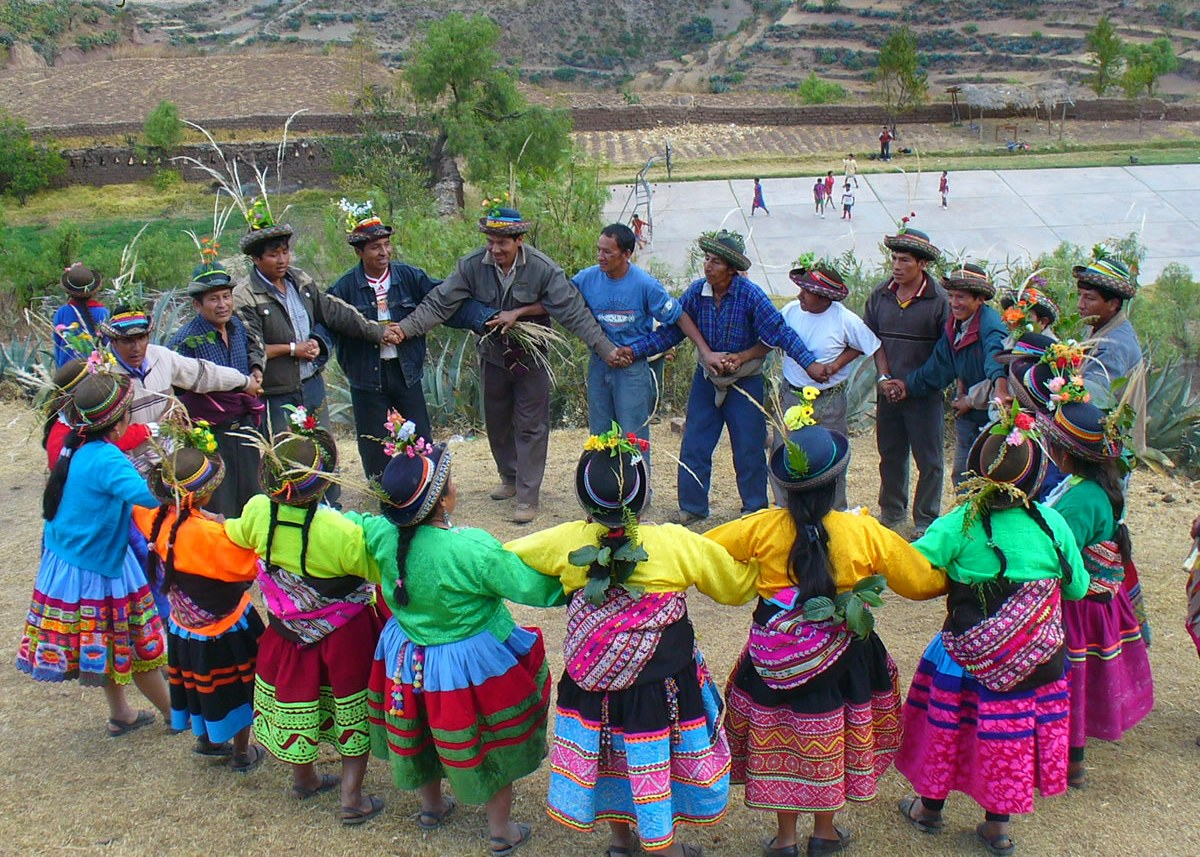
Dancing a qhachwa, Sarwa district, Victor Fajardo Province, Peru

The cachua (qachwa, qhaswa, kashua, kaswa, kachura) (ˈqɑt͡ʃwa or ˈχɑt͡ʃwa, diminutive form cachuita) is a Latin-American baroque dance form found mainly in Peru. It still exists today as a circle dance.

The term comes from the Quechua language qhachwa, meaning "round dance", via Spanish. It was also applied to some villancicos with Spanish texts and cachua rhythm, such as two examples in a report submitted to Charles IV of Spain c.1788-1790. It is in rapid unsyncopated 2/4 time.
