= Mórrope District =

Coordinates: 6.5413°S 80.0150°W

Mórrope
- District
- Interactive map of Mórrope
- Country: Peru
- Region: Lambayeque
- Province: Lambayeque
- Capital: Mórrope

Government
  - Mayor: Nery Alejandro Castillo Santamaria

Area
  - Total: 1,057.66 km^{2} (408.36 sq mi)
- Elevation: 16 m (52 ft)

Population (2005 census)
  - Total: 38,464
  - Density: 36.367/km^{2} (94.190/sq mi)
- Time zone: UTC-5 (PET)
- UBIGEO: 140306

Mórrope District is one of twelve districts of the province Lambayeque in Peru.
