= Emily Berquist =

American historian

Emily Berquist Soule (born Washington, D.C.) is an American historian of Colonial Latin America and the Spanish Empire.

== Life ==
Berquist grew up in Stratford, Connecticut and attended Vassar College, where she studied under James H. Merrell and graduated cum laude in History and Hispanic Studies. She studied Colonial Latin American History at the University of Texas at Austin, earning her Ph.D. there in 2007, studying under Jorge Cañizares-Esguerra and Susan Deans-Smith, among others. She is presently Professor of History at California State University, Long Beach, where she teaches courses on Colonial Latin America, with a special focus on the Atlantic Slave Trade, revolutions, visual culture, and religion. In 2013, she appeared as a historical consultant on the Travel Channel artifact hunting show "Digfellas."

== Works ==
- "Early Antislavery Sentiment in the Spanish Atlantic World, 1765-1817", Slavery & Abolition 31, no. 2 (June 2010): 181-207
- "Bishop Martínez Compañón’s Practical Utopia in Enlightenment Peru", The Americas: A Quarterly Review of Inter-American Cultural History 64, no. 3 (January 2008): 377-408
- The Bishop's Utopia: Envisioning Improvement in Colonial Peru (2014), published by the University of Pennsylvania Press, as part of the "Early Modern Americas" series, edited by Peter Mancall.
- The Atlantic Slave Trade and the Rise and Fall of the Spanish Empire is a grant-supported project.

Berquist was an editor of Charting the Future: Atlantic Studies and Global Currents (2025).

== Awards (selected) ==
- 2019–2020 Fletcher Jones Foundation Fellowship, Huntington Library
- 2014–2015 National Endowment for the Humanities Faculty Award
- 2010–2011 American Council of Learned Societies Fellowship
- 2010–2011 Dibner Fellowship in the History of Science, Huntington Library
- 2003–2004 Fulbright Fellowship
