= Cholón people =

Tribe of South American Indians in Peru

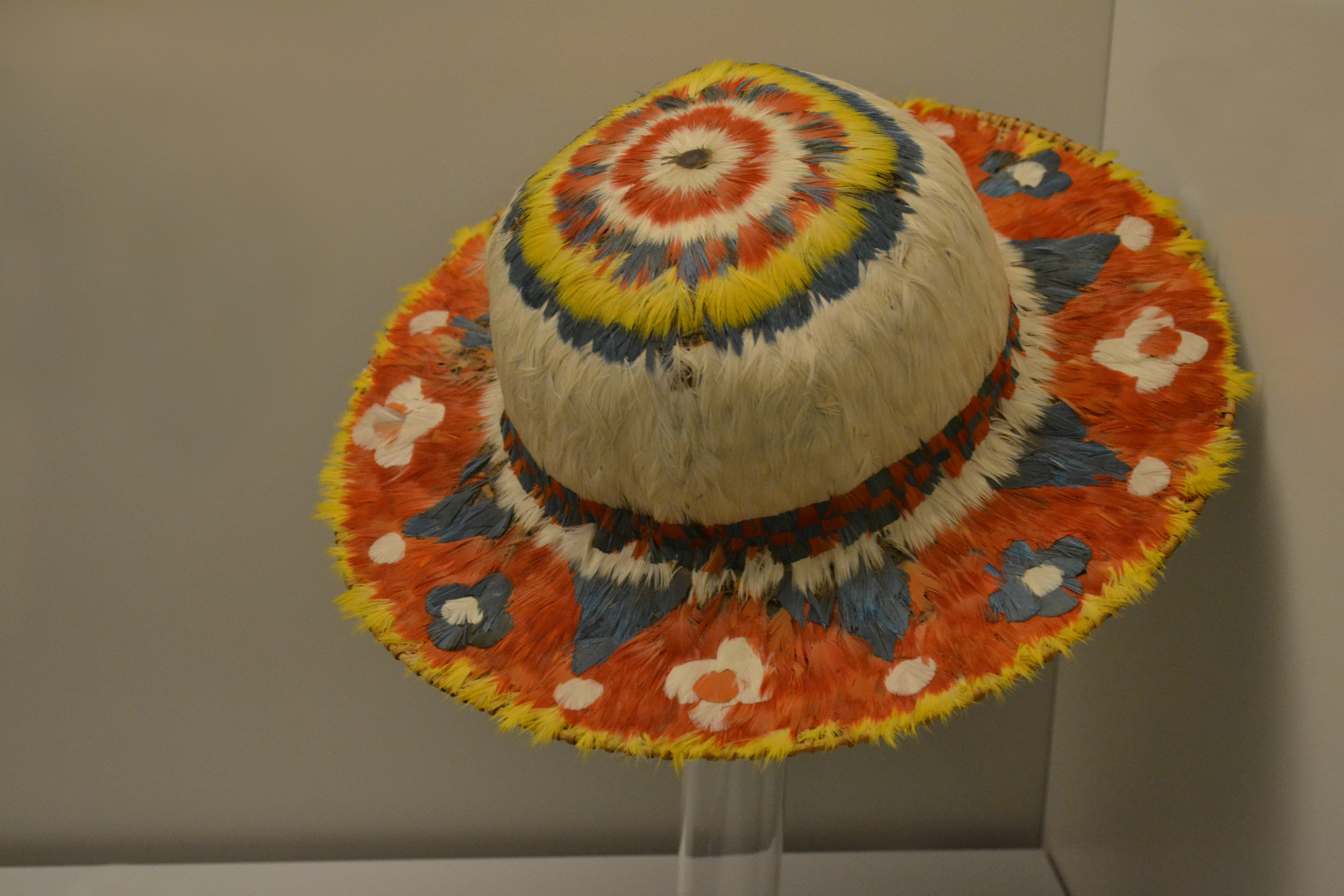
Hat of the Cholones Indians. Made with feathers, silk, fibre and vegetable resin. 18th century.

The Cholones are a tribe of South American Indigenous people in Peru, living on the left bank of the Huallaga River in the Amazon valley. The name is that given them by the Spanish. They were first met by the Franciscans, who established mission villages among them in 1676.

== Life ==
Cholones were living in the district of Tingo Maria, having their own language, Tinganeses, Seeptsa, which was formerly spoken in the valley of Huallaga River from Tingo Maria to Valle. In 1985 there were only one or two speakers of Tinganeses, Seeptsa. Father Francisco Gutierrez of Franciscans composed a work on their language. Cholones believe that carrying the poisonous tooth of a serpent is a protection against the bite of a serpent.

== Economy and trade ==
The common economic pursuits of Cholones include agriculture, hunting, and fishing. Women were engaged in cultivating cotton and weaving. For centuries, the lowland Cholones had trade relations with the highland Hibitos across the bank of the Huallaga river. Some of the important products, which were generally traded, include feather, wax, honey, stone and metal axes, coca, cotton, hardwoods and medicinal herbs.
