= Sechura–Catacao languages =

Proposed language family of Peru

Sechura–Catacao
- (proposed)
- Geographic distribution: Peru
- Linguistic classification: Proposed language family
- Subdivisions: Tallán †; Sechura (Sek) †

Language codes
- Linguasphere: 84-BAA-a
- Glottolog: None
- Distribution of Sechura and Catacaoan in the Piura region.

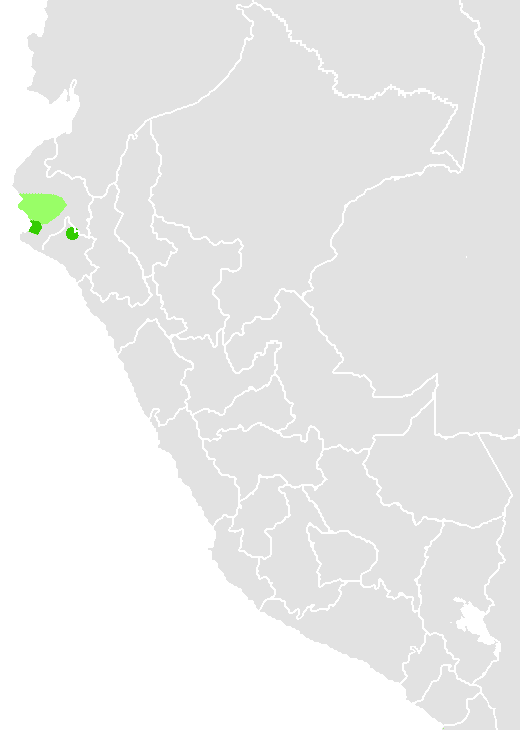
- Map of Tallán, Sechura and poorly known Olmos

Sechura–Catacao is a proposed connection between the language isolates Sechura (Sek) and Tallán of Peru. The languages are extremely poorly known, but Kaufman (1990) finds the connection convincing, Campbell (2012) persuasive.

== External relationships ==
Kaufman (1994: 64) groups Leco and Sechura–Catacao together as part of a proposed Macro-Lecoan family.

Tovar (1961), partly based on Schmidt (1926), classifies Sechura–Catacao together with the Chimuan languages in his Yunga–Puruhá family.

== Vocabulary ==
=== Urban (2019) ===
Comparative word list of Sechura, Colan, and Catacao from Urban (2019):

(M) indicates a reading of the Madrid list, and (B) indicates the Bogotá list.

Sechura, Catacao and Colán wordlists
gloss	Sechura	Colán	Catacao
god	dioós	tios̃	thios
man	su(-)cda (M) / suc(-)cla (B)	yatã(-)dlam	aszat
woman	cuctum	pir-n (M) / pi-m (B)	pi-chi(-)m
soul	alma-cchi	alma	alma
body	cuerpo-cchi	cuerpo	cuerpo
heart	chusiopun(-)ma (M) / chusiopun(-)mo (B) (?)	ñessini-m	ñiesiñi-chi(-)m
meat/flesh	colt	carne	ccol
bone	ruño	dladlapi(-)rãm (M) / dladlape(-)rãm (B)	lalape(-)chen
father	jàchi (M) / jáchi (B)	ma-m̃	pateri
mother	ñiña	nũn (M) / nuñ (B) (?)	ni-chi(-)m
son	ños-ñi	hicu-m̃	ycu-chi(-)m
daughter	ños-ñi	hicu-m̃	ycu-chi(-)m capuc
brother	sican-ñi	pua-m̃	pua-chi(-)m
sister	bapue-ñi (M) / bapuẽ-ni (B)	puru-m̃	puru-chi(-)m
eat	un-uc	aguã	agua-chi(-)m
drink	tut-uc	cũ-m (M) / cum̃ (B) (?)	conecuc
laugh	bus-uc	chañar	chañac
cry	nic	nãr (M) / ñãr (B) (?)	ñar-acñaquitutin
die	lact-uc	dlacati	lacatu
joy	otm-uc	chagasiñ	gozo
pain	pun-uc	masic	masic
death	lact-uc-no	dlacati	ynatac-lacatu
sky	cuchuc-yor	cutũc-nap	cielo
sun	yò(-)ro	turi-nap	nap
moon	ñang(-)ru (M) / ñanoru (B) (?)	nag	nam
stars	chùpchùp	chupuchup	estrellas
fire	morot	huỹur	guanararac
wind	fic	cuiat ñap (M) / cuiat ñag (B)	vic
bird	yaibab	yaiau	yeya
earth	loct	dlurũm	durum
animal	animblà	animal	animal
tree	nusuchu	arbol	chigua(-)sam
trunk	fucù (M) / pucù (B) (?)	tũcu-rãm (M) / tùcu-ram̃ (B) (?)	tucci-càs
branch	rama	yabi-ti(-)ram (M) / yabmram (B) (?)	yabi-que
flower	flor-ac	flor	alhuaca
fruit	fruto	fruto	cosecha-m
grass	un(-)ñiò-còl (M) / unĩuò-còl (B)	agua-col	t(-)agua-col
water	tutù	yũp	yup
sea	roro	amum	amaun
river	tufut	yũp	turu-yup
waves	caph	llam(-)as	olas
rain	purir (M) / putir (B) (?)	nug̃	guayaquinum / guaraquinum (?)
fish	jum	llas	llas

=== Loukotka (1968) ===
Loukotka (1968) lists the following basic vocabulary items.

gloss	Sechura	Catacao	Colan
man	rekla	aszat	yatadlam
water	xoto	yup	yúp
fire	morot	guanararak	hayur
sun	yóro	nap	turi nap
moon	ñangru	nam	nag
bird	yaibab	yeya	yaiau
fish	xuma	l'as	l'as
head	te-uma		
foot	lava		

=== Loukotka (1949) ===
Comparative word list of Sechura, Colan, and Catacao from Loukotka (1949):

==== Notes ====
- (Sp.) = Spanish loanword (excluded)

==== Sources used ====
- Sechura: Buchwald (1919)
- Manuscript by Martínez Compañón from the 1780s

French gloss (original)	English gloss (translated)	Sechura	Kolan	Katakao
animal	animal	animblà	(Sp.)	(Sp.)
arbre	tree	nusuču	(Sp.)	čiguasam
boire	drink	tutuk	kum	konekuk
ciel	sky	kučuk yor	kutuk nap	(Sp.)
cœur	heart	čusiupunma	ñessinim	ñiesiñičim
corps	body	kuerpokči	(Sp.)	(Sp.)
douleur	pain	punuk	masik	masik
eau	water	tutú	yup	yup
étoiles	stars	čúpčúp	čupučup	(Sp.)
femme	woman	kuktum	pim	pičim
feu	fire	morot	huyur	guanararak
fille	daughter	ñosñi	hikum	ykučim kapuk
fils	son	ñosñi	hikum	ykučim
fleur	flower	florak	(Sp.)	alhuaka
fleuve	river	tuxut	yup	turuyup
frère	brother	sikanñi	puam	puačim
fruit	fruit	(Sp.)	(Sp.)	(Sp.)
gai	happy	otmuk	čagasiñ	(Sp.)
herbe	grass	unñiókól	aguakol	taguakol
homme	man	sukda	yatadlam	aszat
lune	moon	ñangru	nag	nam
manger	eat	unuk	agua	aguačim
mer	sea	roro	amum	amaum
mère	mother	ñiña	nun	ničim
mort	dead	laktukno	dlakati	ynataklakatu
oiseau	bird	yaibab	yaiau	yeya
ondes	waves	kaph	llamas	(Sp.)
os	bone	ruño	dladlapiram	lalapečen
père	father	xači	mam	(Sp.)
pleurer	cry	nik	ñar	ñarakñakitutin
pluie	rain	purir	nug	guayakinum
poisson	fish	xum	llas	llas
rameau	branch	(Sp.)	yabitiram	yabike
régner	reign	busuk	čañar	čañak
sœur	sister	bapueñi	purum	puručim
soleil	sun	yóro	turinap	nap
terre	earth	lokt	dlurum	durum
tronc	trunk	fukú	tukuram	taksikás
vent	wind	fik	kuiat ñap	vik
viande	meat	kolt	(Sp.)	kkol
