= Codex Martínez Compañón =

18th-century manuscript from Peru

Codex Trujillo del Perú
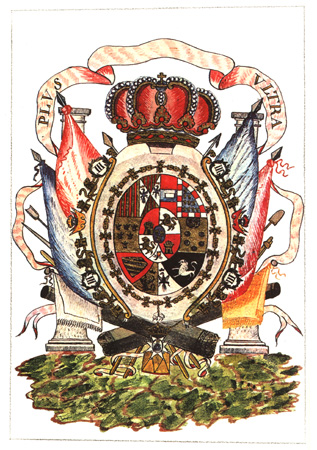
- Author: Baltasar Jaime Martínez Compañón
- Language: spanish

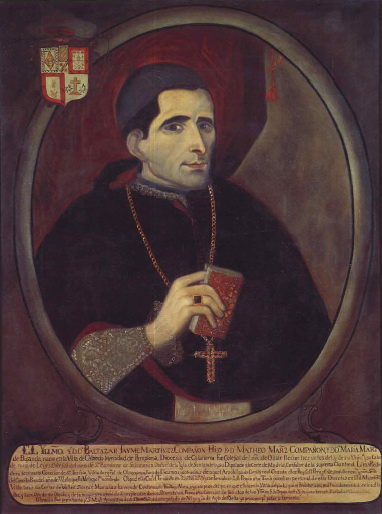
Baltasar Jaime Martínez Compañón

The Codex Martínez Compañón or Codex Trujillo del Perú c. 1782–1785, is a manuscript edited in nine volumes by the bishop of Trujillo, Peru, made by Baltasar Jaime Martínez Compañón, containing 1,411 watercolours and 20 musical scores documenting life in his diocese. This work was sent to Charles IV of Spain, who included it in the Royal Library in 1803. The musical examples in the bishop's text were probably written out by Pedro José Solis, maestro de capilla of Trujillo Cathedral from 1781 to 1823.

== The 1,411 illustrations ==
The watercolour illustrations contain pictures of the life of the Indians, clothing, customs, and also extensive natural history.

A selection was shown at the Lima Art Museum in 2018 in "El Perú ilustrado. Martínez Compañón y su legado", alongside later illustrated works on Peru, including Antigüedades peruanas (1851).

=== External links to galleries ===
- Thumbnails of trees

== The 20 musical examples ==
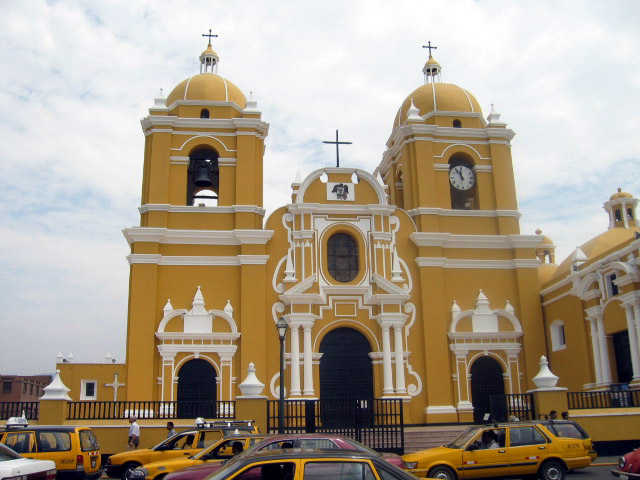
Trujillo Cathedral

The pieces are mainly short, 2 or 3 minutes each. The order here follows the K617 recording rather than Folio order:

1. Cachua: Al Nacimiento de Christo Nuestro Señor
2. Tonada: La Brugita, de Guamachuco - i.e. Huamachuco, site of Augustinian missions
3. Tonada: El Congo - a slave song, reflecting the use of African slaves in the workforce from 1660
4. Tonada: El Tuppamaro de Caxamarca
5. Tonada del Chimo - i.e. of the Chimú culture, the only surviving song in the extinct Mochica language
6. Dance: Baile del Chimo, Folio 179 (instrumental)
7. Tonada: El diamante, de Chachapoias - Folio 187
8. Tonada: La Lata - "the can"
9. Tonada: La Selosa, del pueblo de Lambayeque - "the jealous woman"
10. Tonada: El Conejo
11. Tonada: El Huicho, de Chachapoyas
12. Dance: Bayle de danzantes con pifano y tamboril (Instrumental)
13. Tonada: La Donosa
14. Cachuyta de la montaña: "El Vuen Querer" - montaña indicates the lowland east of the mountains
15. Cachua a duo y a quatro: Al Nacimiento de Christo Nuestro Señor
16. Lanchas para baylar, Folio 186 - instrumental, the term lancha, literally "flat boat, launch for dancing", indicates a dance for fiddle and continuo in quick 3/4 time, and is almost unique to the Codex
17. Tonada: El Tupamaro de Caxamarca
18. Tonadilla: El Palomo, del pueblo de Lambayeque
19. Cachua Serranita: El Huicho Nuebo, a Nuestra Señora del Carmen, de la ciudad de Trujillo (Otusco)
20. Cachua: La Despedida, de Guamachuco - a cachua for leave-taking

=== Recordings ===
- selection - Al uso de nuestra tierra (In the style of our land) Música Temprana, Netherlands. Voice of Lyrics 2001, nla.
- complete - Codex Martinez Companon, Capilla de Indias, Tiziana Palmiero, Conductor, K617. This is the first recording of the complete 20 pieces.
- 2 selections - on Patricia Petibon recital Nouveau Monde Marcon DGG, 2012
- complete - "Bailes, Tonadas & Cachuas", Songs and dances from Trujillo, Peru (18th century), Música Temprana, director: Adrián Rodríguez Van der Spoel, 2013. Deuss Music. COBRA0036.
- selection - "Son de los diablos" Tonadas afro-hispanas del Peru - DIANA BARONI & Sapukai - Alpha Productions, Les Chants de la Terre 2003 - Alpha 507
