= Baltasar Jaime Martínez Compañón =

Spanish prelate (1737–1797)

- Archbishop of Santa Fe en Nueva Granada
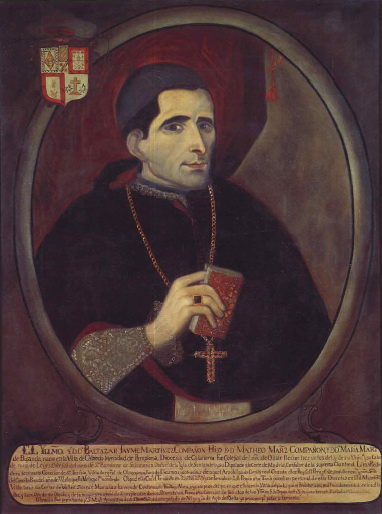
- Baltasar Jaime Martínez Compañón y Bujanda, ecclesiastical portrait c. 1790
- Native name: Baltasar Jaime Martínez de Compañón Bujanda
- Church: Catholic Church
- Archdiocese: Archdiocese of Santa Fe en Nueva Granada
- In office: 15 December 1788 – 17 August 1797
- Predecessor: Antonio Caballero y Góngora
- Successor: Fernando del Portillo y Torres
- Previous post: Bishop of Trujillo (1778–1788)

Orders
- Ordination: 1761
- Consecration: 25 March 1779 by Diego Antonio de Parada

Personal details
- Born: January 1737 Cabredo, Kingdom of Navarre, Kingdom of Spain
- Died: 17 August 1797 (aged 60) Santafé de Bogotá, Viceroyalty of New Granada, Spanish Empire

Baltasar Jaime Martínez Compañón (1737–1797) was a Spanish prelate who served as Bishop of Trujillo, Peru from 1779 to 1790, at Trujillo Cathedral, and Archbishop of Bogotá, New Granada, from 1790 to 1797. He was responsible for founding new towns, building schools, and reforming the silver mine at Hualgayoc. He is most remarkable for his efforts to educate Trujillo's Indians and for his research into local plants, animals, archaeological ruins, music, and native cultures.

== Background and education ==
Martínez Compañón was born in Cabredo, Navarre (Spain) and studied religious law at the Universities of Huesca and Zaragoza in Aragón before earning his bachelor's degree at the University of Oñate in Guipuzcoa in 1759, and his doctorate at Oñate in 1763. He was ordained as a Catholic priest in 1761. In 1766, he served as an advisor to the Holy Office of the Inquisition in Madrid.

== Early career in America ==
In 1767, King Charles III of Spain named Martínez Compañón choirmaster of the Metropolitan Cathedral of Lima, Peru. In 1772 and 1773, he served as Secretary to the Sixth Provincial Church Council of Peru, held in Lima. From 1770 to 1778, he served as rector of the Saint Toribio seminary, also in Lima.

== Bishop of Trujillo ==
King Charles III named Martínez Compañón Bishop of Trujillo, Peru, on 25 February 1778. While there, he explored his bishopric in a visitation that lasted two years, eight months, and eight days. During this time, he gathered the information that would become the basis of his projects to found new towns and schools. He planned to create special schools for Indian boys and girls where they would learn trade and craft skills as well as basic literacy. He also imagined an elaborate plan to create a utopian mining town at the Hualgayoc silver mine, outside Cajamarca.

== Archbishop of Bogotá ==
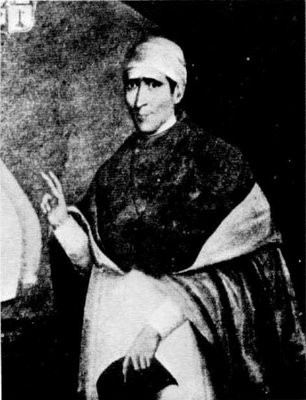
Baltasar Jaime Martínez Compañón

After arriving in Bogotá on 12 March 1791, Martínez Compañón repaired local churches, founded five primary schools throughout the city, and established a seminary. He also became friends with noted botanist José Celestino Mutis.

== Death ==
Martínez Compañón died of old age on 17 August 1797. Local legend holds that a smell of flowers emanated from his corpse and for three days the sun did not shine.

== Legacy ==
When Martínez Compañón died, he left behind a natural history collection of animals, plants, artifacts and manufactures. These comprised a total of 24 boxes. Today part of the collection is held at the Museo de América in Madrid, although the majority of it has been lost. He also sent to Spain a nine-volume set of watercolor images depicting the people, plants, and animals of Trujillo, the Codex Martínez Compañón. Drawn by local artisans, these 1,372 images are a unique example of vernacular natural history produced in the colonial context. The originals survive today in the library of the Royal Palace in Madrid.

== Bibliography ==
- Berquist, Emily (March 2014). The Bishop's Utopia: Imagining Improvement in Colonial Peru. University of Pennsylvania Press.
- Berquist, Emily (January 2008). "Bishop Martínez Compañón's Practical Utopia in Enlightenment Peru". The Americas: A Quarterly Review of Inter-American Cultural History. 64 (3): 377–408.
- Berquist, Emily (2007). The Science of Empire: Bishop Martínez Compañón and the Enlightenment in Peru (PhD thesis). University of Texas at Austin.
- Navarro, J. (1991). Vida y Obra del Obispo Martínez Compañón (in Spanish). Piura: Universidad de Piura.
- Pérez Ayala, José Manuel (1955). Baltasar Jaime Martínez Compañón y Bujanda, Prelado Español de Colombia y el Perú (in Spanish). Bogotá: Imprenta Nacional.
- Pillsbury, Joanne; Trever, Lisa (2008). "The King, the Bishop, and the Creation of an American Antiquity". Ñawpa Pacha. 29.
- Pillsbury, Joanne; Trever, Lisa (2011). "Martínez Compañón and His Illustrated "Museum"". In Mancall, Peter C.; Bleichmar, Daniela (eds.). Collecting Across Cultures: Material Exchanges in the Early Modern Atlantic World. Philadelphia: University of Pennsylvania Press.
- Restrepo, Daniel (1992). Sociedad y Religión en Trujillo (Perú) Bajo el Episcopado de Baltasar Jaime Martínez Compañón, 1780–1790 (in Spanish). Vitoria-Gasteiz: Servicio Central de Publicaciones, Gobierno Vasco.
- Rodríguez Van der Spoel, Adrián (2013). Bailes, Tonadas & Cachuas: The Music of the 18th Century Codex Trujillo del Perú. The Hague: Deuss Music.
- Vargas Ugarte, Rubén (1966). Tres Figuras Señeras del Episcopado Americano (in Spanish). Lima: Carlos Milla Batres.
