= Culli language =

Extinct language of northern Peru

Culli
- Ilinga
- Native to: Peru
- Region: La Libertad, Cajamarca (Cajabamba), Ancash (Pallasca)
- Extinct: mid-20th century possible speakers in remote villages
- Language family: Language isolate

Language codes
- ISO 639-3: None (mis)
- Glottolog: cull1235
- Linguasphere: 84-EAA-aa
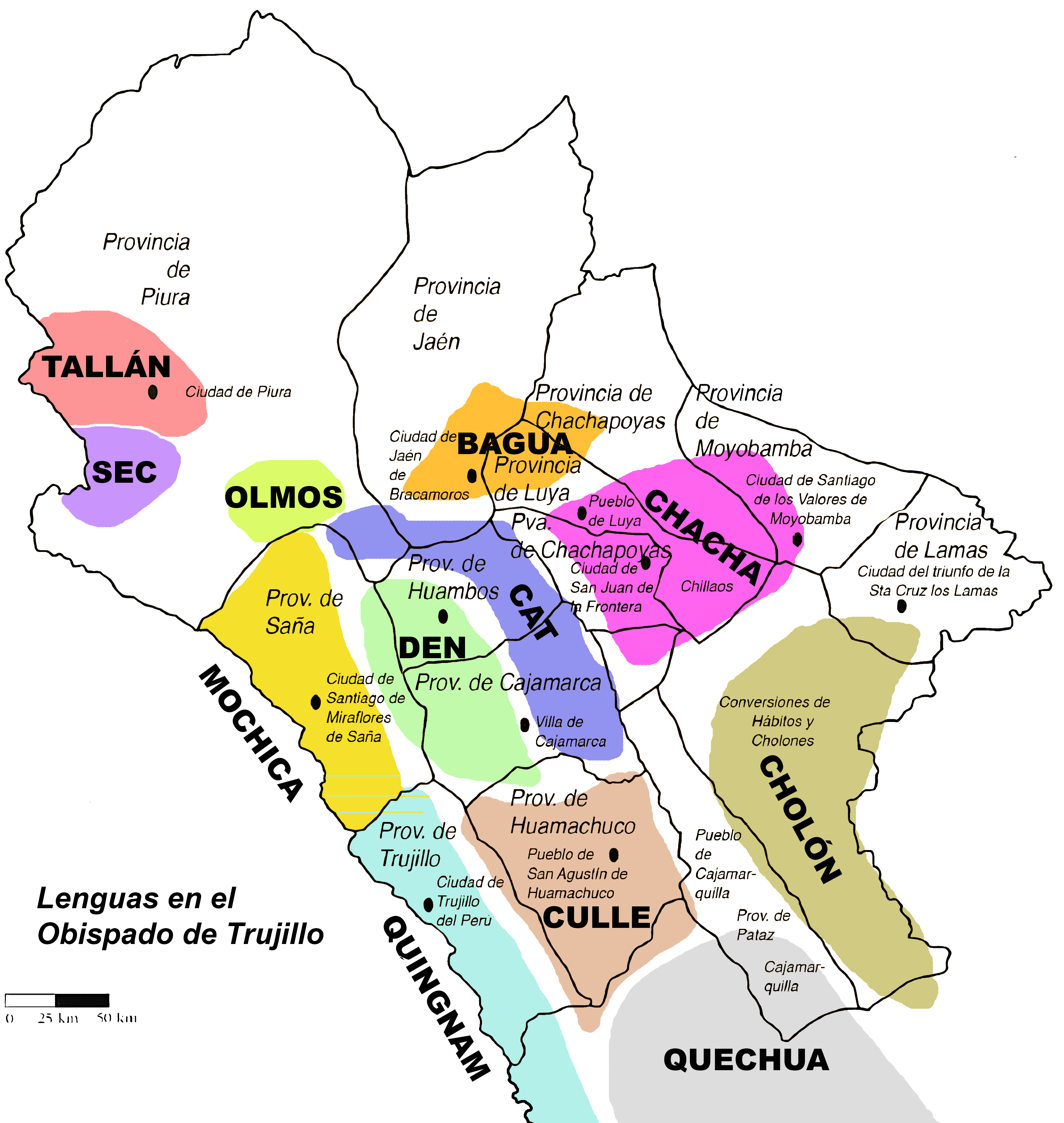
- Culle

- Culle is classified as Extinct by the UNESCO Atlas of the World's Languages in Danger.

Culli, also spelled Culle, Cullí, or Kulyi, also called Ilinga, is a poorly attested extinct language of the Andean highlands of northern Peru.

== Vocabulary ==
- Manuscript by Martínez Compañón from the 1700s
- Words collected by Paul Rivet in 1934 from a 1915 wordlist recorded by priest of Cabana Teodoro Meléndez Gonzales of Pallasca, Department of Ancash, Peru

The following wordlist from the "plan" is taken from the Madrid manuscript.

| gloss | Culli (Martínez Compañón) |
|---|---|
| God | yaià |
| man | usù |
| woman | ahhi |
| soul | alma |
| body | cuerpu |
| heart | chucuàll |
| meat/flesh | aycha |
| bone | mosčár |
| father | quinù |
| mother | mamǎ |
| son | usu ogǒll |
| daughter | ahhi ogǒll |
| brother | quimit |
| sister | cañi |
| eat | miù |
| drink | cumù |
| laugh | canquiù |
| cry | ačasù |
| die | čollapù |
| joy | cuhi |
| pain | pillach |
| death | caní |
| sky | cielo |
| sun | sú |
| moon | mùñ |
| stars | chuip |
| fire | mú |
| wind | llucá |
| bird | pichuñ |
| earth | pús |
| animal | animal |
| tree | urù |
| trunk | mučh-cusǧá |
| branch | urù saĝ̌ars |
| flower | chuchú |
| fruit | huačohú |
| grass | paihač |
| water | coñ |
| sea | quidā |
| river | uram |
| waves | còñpulcasù |
| rain | čau |
| fish | challuǎ |

| gloss | Culli (Gonzáles) |
|---|---|
| wood | guro |
| firewood | pišose |
| poncho | maiko |
| hat | muntua |
| dog | korep |
| neck | uro |
| water | goñ |
| bird drinking water | pičon-goñ |
| listen! | čo |
| candle | nina |
| hand | pui |
| I want to eat chicken | ki amberto gual′pe |
| bread eater | huiku-vana |
| dead | kani |
| bread | vana |
| foot | mai |
| sandals | mai-vil |
| head | ču |
| stomach | odre |
