= Classification of the Indigenous languages of the Americas =

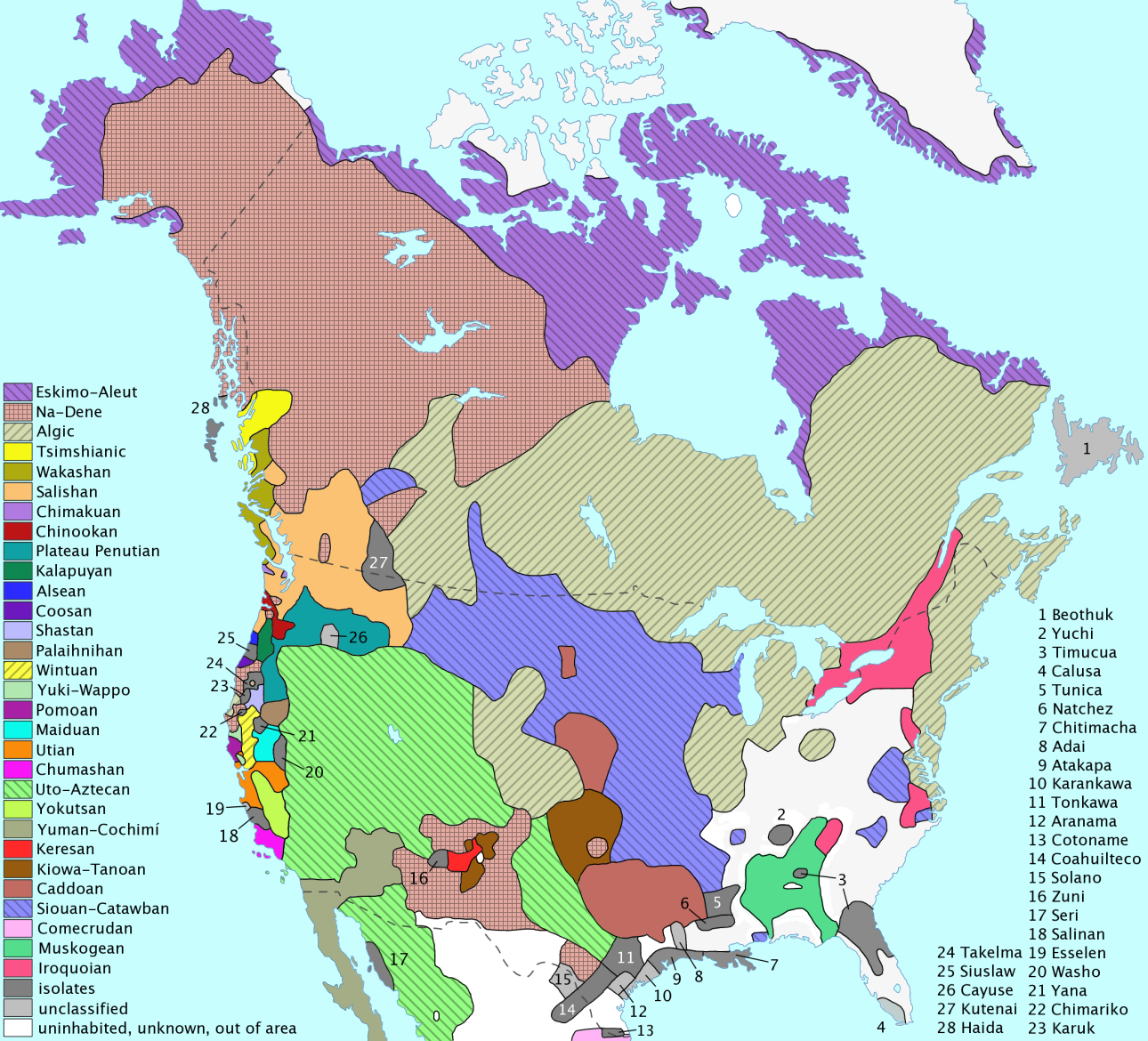
Pre-contact distribution of North American language families north of Mexico

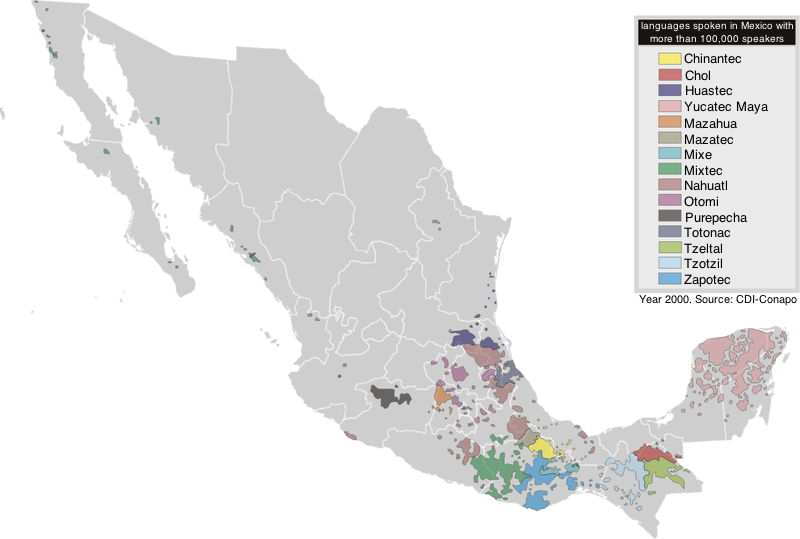
The indigenous languages of Mexico that have more than 100,000 speakers

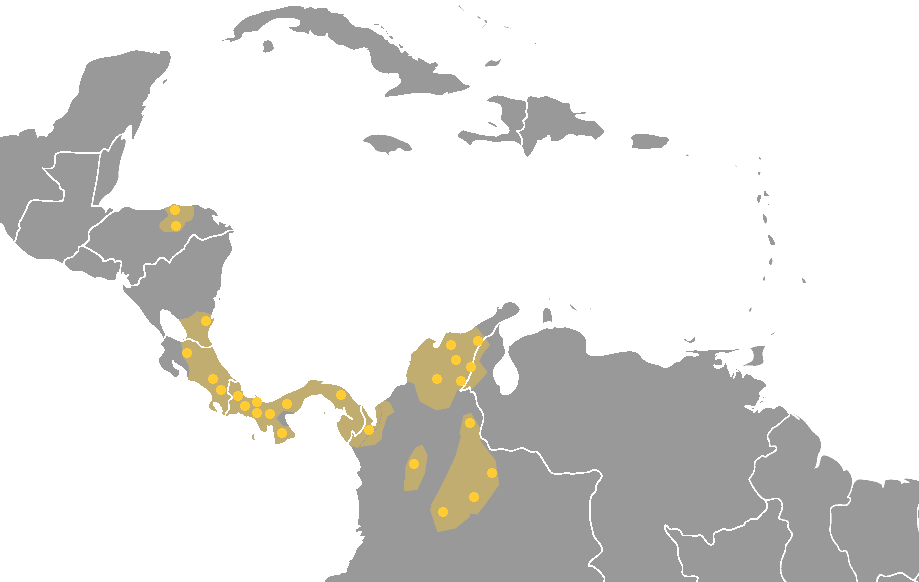
The Chibchan languages

This is a list of different language classification proposals developed for the Indigenous languages of the Americas or Amerindian languages. The article is divided into North, Central, and South America sections; however, the classifications do not correspond to these divisions.

== North America ==
=== Glottolog 4.1 (2019) ===
Glottolog 4.1 (2019) recognizes 42 independent families and 31 isolates in North America (73 total). The vast majority are (or were) spoken in the United States, with 26 families and 26 isolates (52 total).

North American languages families proposed in Glottolog 4.1

Families (42)

1. Otomanguean (180)
2. Arawakan (78)
3. Uto-Aztecan (69)
4. Algic (46)
5. Athabaskan-Eyak-Tlingit (45)
6. Mayan (33)
7. Chibchan (27)
8. Salishan (25)
9. Mixe-Zoque (19)
10. Siouan (18)
11. Eskimo–Aleut (12)
12. Totonacan (12)
13. Cochimi-Yuman (11)
14. Iroquoian (11)
15. Miwok-Costanoan (11)
16. Kiowa-Tanoan (8)
17. Muskogean (7)
18. Pomoan (7)
19. Chumashan (6)
20. Wakashan (6)
21. Caddoan (5)
22. Misumalpan (5)
23. Sahaptian (5)
24. Xincan (5)
25. Chinookan (4)
26. Huavean (4)
27. Maiduan (4)
28. Yokutsan (4)
29. Kalapuyan (3)
30. Shastan (3)
31. Tequistlatecan (3)
32. Tsimshian (3)
33. Chimakuan (2)
34. Coosan (2)
35. Haida (2)
36. Jicaquean (2)
37. Keresan (2)
38. Lencan (2)
39. Palaihnihan (2)
40. Tarascan (2)
41. Wintuan (2)
42. Yuki-Wappo (2)

Isolates (31)

1. Adai
2. Alsea-Yaquina
3. Atakapa
4. Beothuk
5. Cayuse
6. Chimariko
7. Chitimacha
8. Coahuilteco
9. Comecrudan
10. Cotoname
11. Cuitlatec
12. Esselen
13. Guaicurian
14. Karankawa
15. Karok
16. Klamath-Modoc
17. Kutenai
18. Maratino
19. Molale
20. Natchez
21. Salinan
22. Seri
23. Siuslaw
24. Takelma
25. Timucua
26. Tonkawa
27. Tunica
28. Washo
29. Yana
30. Yuchi
31. Zuni

=== Gallatin (1836) ===
An early attempt at North American language classification was attempted by A. A. Albert Gallatin published in 1826, 1836, and 1848. Gallatin's classifications are missing several languages which are later recorded in the classifications by Daniel G. Brinton and John Wesley Powell. (Gallatin supported the assimilation of indigenous peoples to Euro-American culture.)

(Current terminology is indicated parenthetically in italics.)

Families

1. Algonkin-Lenape (=Algonquian)
2. Athapascas (=Athabaskan)
3. Catawban (=Catawba + Woccons)
4. Eskimaux (=Eskimoan)
5. Iroquois (=Northern Iroquoian)
6. Cherokees (=Southern Iroquoian)
7. Muskogee (=Eastern Muskogean)
8. Chahtas (=Western Muskogean)
9. Sioux (=Siouan)

Languages

1. Adaize (=Adai)
2. Attacapas (=Atakapa)
3. Salmon River (=Bella Coola)
4. Black Feet (=Blackfoot)
5. Pawnees (=Pawnee)
6. Caddoes (=Caddo)
7. Chinooks (=Chinookan)
8. Chetimachas (=Chitimacha)
9. Fall Indians (=Gros Ventre)
10. Queen Charlotte's Island (=Haida)

11. Straits of Fuca (=Makah)
12. Natches (=Natchez)
13. Wakash (=Nootka)
14. Salish (=Salishan)
15. Shoshonees (=Shoshone)
16. Atnahs (=Shuswap)
17. Kinai (=Tanaina)
18. Koulischen (=Tlingit)
19. Utchees (=Yuchi)

=== Gallatin (1848) ===
Families

1. Algonquian languages
2. Athabaskan languages
3. Catawban languages
4. Eskimoan languages
5. Iroquoian languages (Northern)
6. Iroquoian languages (Southern)
7. Muskogean languages
8. Siouan languages

Languages

1. Adai
2. Alsean
3. Apache
4. Arapaho
5. Atakapa
6. Caddoan, Northern
7. Caddoan, Southern
8. Cayuse-Molala
9. Chinookan
10. Chitimacha
11. Comanche
12. Haida
13. Kalapuyan
14. Kiowa
15. Klamath
16. Koasati-Alabama
17. Kootenai

18. Kutchin
19. Maricopa (Yuman)
20. Natchez
21. Palaihnihan
22. Plains Apache
23. Sahaptian
24. Salishan
25. Shasta
26. Shoshone
27. Tanaina
28. Tlingit
29. Tsimshian
30. Ute
31. Wakashan, Southern
32. Wichita
33. Yuchi

=== Powell's (1892) "Fifty-eight" ===
John Wesley Powell, an explorer who served as director of the Bureau of American Ethnology, published a classification of 58 "stocks" that is the "cornerstone" of genetic classifications in North America. Powell's classification was influenced by Gallatin to a large extent.

John Wesley Powell was in a race with Daniel G. Brinton to publish the first comprehensive classification of North America languages (although Brinton's classification also covered South and Central America). As a result of this competition, Brinton was not allowed access to the linguistic data collected by Powell's fieldworkers.

(More current names are indicated parenthetically.)

1. Adaizan
2. Algonquian
3. Athapascan
4. Attacapan (=Atakapa)
5. Beothukan (=Beothuk)
6. Caddoan
7. Chimakuan
8. Chimarikan (=Chimariko)
9. Chimmesyan (=Tsimshian)
10. Chinookan
11. Chitimachan (=Chitimacha)
12. Chumashan
13. Coahuiltecan
14. Copehan (=Wintuan)
15. Costanoan
16. Eskimauan (=Eskimoan)
17. Esselenian (=Esselen)
18. Iroquoian
19. Kalapooian (=Kalapuyan)
20. Karankawan (=Karankawa)

21. Keresan
22. Kiowan (=Kiowa)
23. Kitunahan (=Kutenai)
24. Koluschan (=Tlingit)
25. Kulanapan (=Pomoan)
26. Kusan (=Coosan)
27. Lutuamian (=Klamath-Modoc)
28. Mariposan (=Yokutsan)
29. Moquelumnan (=Miwokan)
30. Muskhogean (=Muskogean)
31. Natchesan (=Natchez)
32. Palaihnihan
33. Piman (=Uto-Aztecan)
34. Pujunan (=Maiduan)
35. Quoratean (=Karok)
36. Salinan
37. Salishan
38. Sastean (=Shastan)
39. Shahaptian (=Sahaptian)

40. Shoshonean (=Uto-Aztecan)
41. Siouan (=Siouan–Catawba)
42. Skittagetan (=Haida)
43. Takilman (=Takelma)
44. Tañoan (=Tanoan)
45. Timuquanan (=Timucua)
46. Tonikan (=Tunica)
47. Tonkawan (=Tonkawa)
48. Uchean (=Yuchi)
49. Waiilatpuan (=Cayuse & Molala)
50. Wakashan
51. Washoan (=Washo)
52. Weitspekan (=Yurok)
53. Wishoskan (=Wiyot)
54. Yakonan (=Siuslaw & Alsean)
55. Yanan
56. Yukian
57. Yuman
58. Zuñian (=Zuni)

=== Rivet (1924) ===
Paul Rivet (1924) lists a total of 46 independent language families in North and Central America. Olive and Janambre are extinct languages of Tamaulipas, Mexico.

North American families

1. Algonkin
2. Beothuk
3. Eskimo
4. Hoka
5. Iroquois (Irokwa)
6. Kaddo
7. Keres
8. Kiowa
9. Klamath
10. Kutenai
11. Muskhogi
12. Na-Dene
13. Penutia
14. Sahaptin
15. Salish
16. Siou (Syu)
17. Tano
18. Timukua
19. Chimakum
20. Tunika
21. Uto-Azten
22. Waiilatpu
23. Wakash
24. Yuki
25. Yuchi
26. Zuñi

Central American families

1. Amusgo
2. Kuikatec
3. Kuitlatek
4. Lenka
5. Maya
6. Miskito-Sumo-Matagalpa
7. Mixe-Zoke
8. Mixtek
9. Olive
10. Otomi
11. Paya
12. Subtiaba
13. Tarask (Michoacano)
14. Totonak
15. Chinantek
16. Waїkuri
17. Xanambre (Janambre)
18. Xikake (Jicaque)
19. Xinka (Jinca, Sinca)
20. Zapotek

=== Sapir (1929): Encyclopædia Britannica ===
Below is Edward Sapir's (1929) famous Encyclopædia Britannica classification. Note that Sapir's classification was controversial at the time and it additionally was an original proposal (unusual for general encyclopedias). Sapir was part of a "lumper" movement in Native American language classification. Sapir himself writes of his classification: "A more far-reaching scheme than Powell's [1891 classification], suggestive but not demonstrable in all its features at the present time" (Sapir 1929: 139). Sapir's classifies all the languages in North America into only 6 families: Eskimo–Aleut, Algonkin–Wakashan, Na-Dene, Penutian, Hokan–Siouan, and Aztec–Tanoan. Sapir's classification (or something derivative) is still commonly used in general languages-of-the-world type surveys. (Note that the question marks that appear in Sapir's list below are present in the original article.)

"Proposed Classification of American Indian Languages North of Mexico (and Certain Languages of Mexico and Central America)"

**I. Eskimo–Aleut**

**II. Algonkin–Wakashan**

1. Algonkin–Ritwan

(1) Algonkin
(2) Beothuk (?)
(3) Ritwan

(a) Wiyot
(b) Yurok

2. Kootenay
3. Mosan (Wakashan–Salish)

(1) Wakashan (Kwakiutl–Nootka)
(2) Chimakuan
(3) Salish

**III. Nadene**

1. Haida
2. Continental Nadene

(1) Tlingit
(2) Athabaskan

**IV. Penutian**

1. Californian Penutian

(1) Miwok-Costanoan
(2) Yokuts
(3) Maidu
(4) Wintun

2. Oregon Penutian

(1) Takelma
(2) Coast Oregon Penutian

(a) Coos
(b) Siuslaw
(c) Yakonan

(3) Kalapuya

3. Chinook
4. Tsimshian
5. Plateau Penutian

(1) Sahaptin
(2) Waiilatpuan (Molala–Cayuse)
(3) Lutuami (Klamath-Modoc)

6. Mexican Penutian

(1) Mixe–Zoque
(2) Huave

**V. Hokan–Siouan**

1. Hokan–Coahuiltecan

A. Hokan

(1) Northern Hokan

(a) Karok, Chimariko, Shasta–Achomawi
(b) Yana
(c) Pomo

(2) Washo
(3) Esselen–Yuman

(a) Esselen
(b) Yuman

(4) Salinan–Seri

(a) Salinan
(b) Chumash
(c) Seri

(5) Tequistlatecan (Chontal)

B. Subtiaba–Tlappanec
C. Coahuiltecan

(1) Tonkawa
(2) Coahuilteco

(a) Coahuilteco proper
(b) Cotoname
(c) Comecrudo

(3) Karankawa

2. Yuki
3. Keres
4. Tunican

(1) Tunica–Atakapa
(2) Chitimacha

5. Iroquois

(1) Iroquoian
(2) Caddoan

6. Eastern group

(1) Siouan–Yuchi

(a) Siouan
(b) Yuchi

(2) Natchez–Muskogian

(a) Natchez
(b) Muskogian
(c) Timucua (?)

**VI. Aztec–Tanoan**

1. Uto-Aztekan

(1) Nahuatl
(2) Piman
(3) Shoshonean

2. Tanoan–Kiowa

(1) Tanoan
(2) Kiowa

3. Zuñi (?)

=== Voegelin & Voegelin (1965): The "Consensus" of 1964 ===
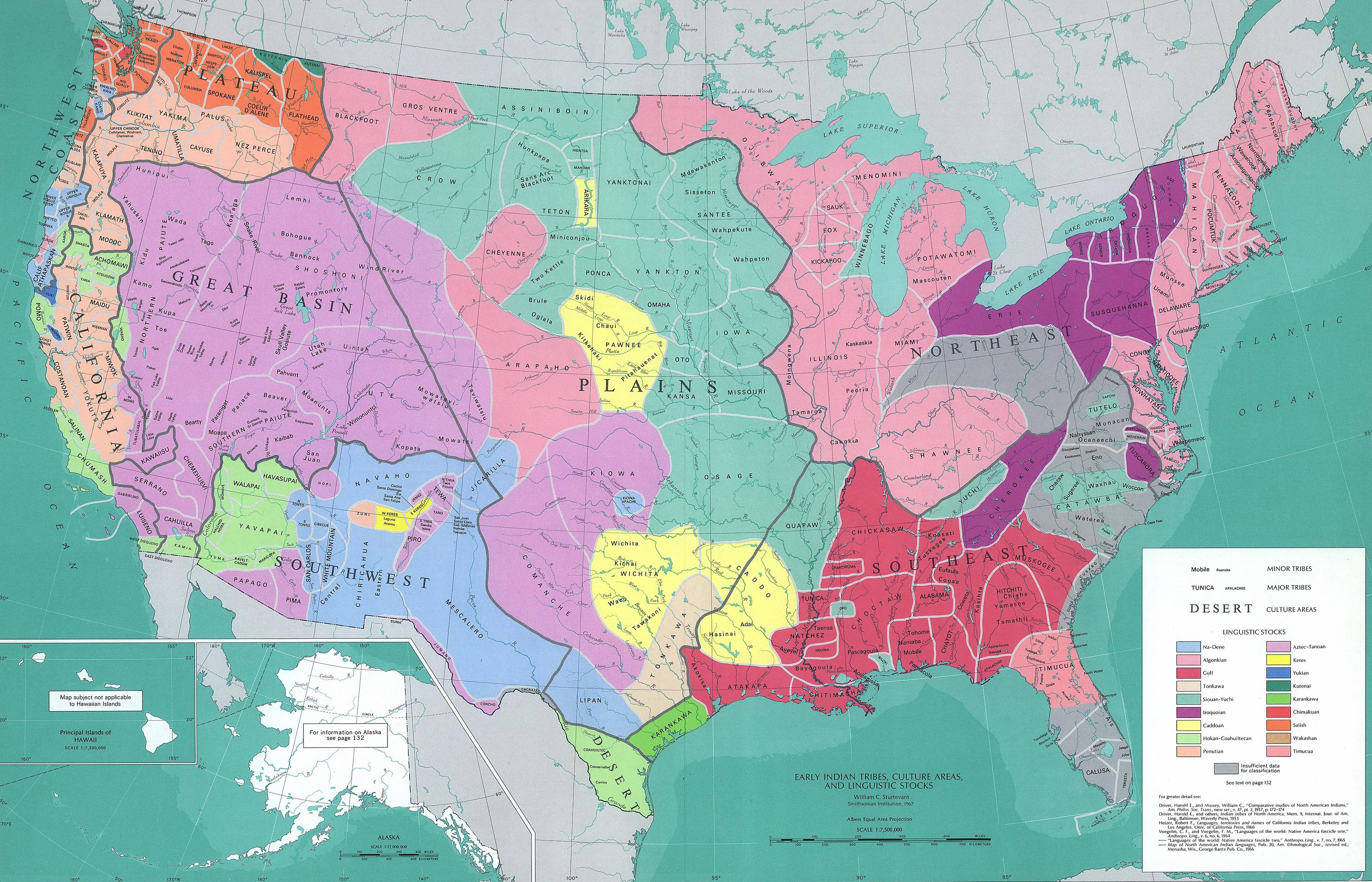

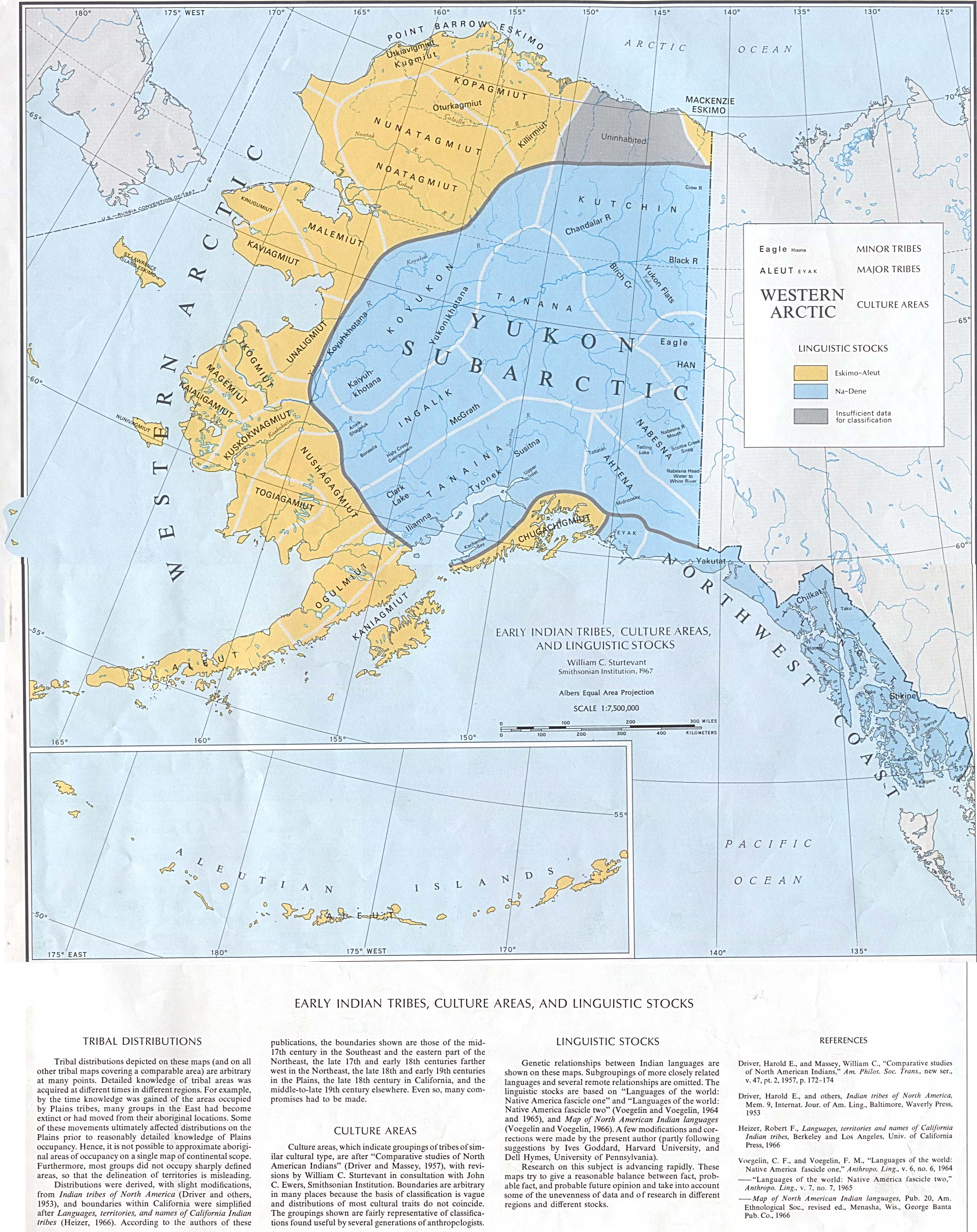

The Voegelin & Voegelin (1965) classification was the result of a conference of Americanist linguists held at Indiana University in 1964. This classification identifies 16 main genetic units.

1. **American Arctic-Paleosiberian** phylum
  - Eskimo–Aleut
  - Chukchi–Kamchatkan
2. **Na-Dene** phylum
  - Athapascan
  - Tlingit
  - Haida
3. **Macro-Algonquian** phylum
  - Algonquian
  - Yurok
  - Wiyot
  - Muskogean
  - Natchez
  - Atakapa
  - Chitimacha
  - Tunica
  - Tonkawa
4. **Macro-Siouan** phylum
  - Siouan
  - Catawba
  - Iroquoian
  - Caddoan
  - Yuchi
5. **Hokan** phylum
  - Yuman
  - Seri
  - Pomoan
  - Palaihnihan
  - Shastan
  - Yanan
  - Chimariko
  - Washo
  - Salinan
  - Karok
  - Chumashan
  - Comecrudan
  - Coahuiltecan
  - Esselen
  - Jicaque
  - Tlapanecan
  - Tequistlatecan

6. **Penutian** phylum

- Yokuts
- Maidu
- Wintun
- Miwok–Costanoan
- Klamath–Modoc
- Sahaptin–Nez Perce
- Cayuse
- Molale
- Coos
- Yakonan
- Takelma
- Kalapuya
- Chinookan
- Tsimshian
- Zuni
- Mixe–Zoque
- Mayan
- Chipaya–Uru
- Totonacan
- Huave

7. **Aztec–Tanoan** phylum

- Kiowa–Tanoan
- Uto-Aztecan

8. **Keres**
9. **Yuki**
10. **Beothuk**
11. **Kutenai**
12. **Karankawa**
13. **Chimakuan**
14. **Salish**
15. **Wakashan**
16. **Timucua**

Chumashan, Comecrudan, and Coahuiltecan are included in Hokan with "reservations". Esselen is included in Hokan with "strong reservations". Tsimshian and Zuni are included in Penutian with reservations.

=== Campbell & Mithun (1979): The "Black Book" ===
Campbell & Mithun's 1979 classification is more conservative, since it insists on more rigorous demonstration of genetic relationship before grouping. Thus, many of the speculative phyla of previous authors are "split".

=== Goddard (1996), Campbell (1997), Mithun (1999) ===
(preliminary)

Classification by Goddard (1996), Campbell (1997), Mithun (1999)

**Families**

1. Algic
  1. Algonquian
  2. Wiyot (> Ritwan?)
  3. Yurok (> Ritwan?)
2. Na-Dene
  1. Eyak-Athabaskan
    1. Eyak
    2. Athabaskan
  2. Tlingit
3. Caddoan (> Macro-Siouan?)
4. Chimakuan
5. Chinookan (> Penutian?)
6. Chumashan [chúmash]
7. Comecrudan
8. Coosan [kus] (> Coast Penutian?)
9. Eskimo–Aleut
  1. Eskimoan
  2. Aleut = Unangan
10. Iroquoian
11. Kalapuyan [kalapúyan]
12. Kiowa–Tanoan
13. Maiduan
14. Muskogean
15. Palaihnihan (Achumawi–Atsugewi)
16. Pomoan
17. Sahaptian
18. Salishan
19. Shastan
20. Siouan–Catawban
  1. Siouan
  2. Catawban
21. Tsimshianic
22. Utian
  1. Miwok
  2. Costanoan
23. Utaztecan
  1. Numic = Plateau
  2. Tübatulabal = Kern
  3. Takic = Southern California
  4. Hopi = Pueblo
  5. Tepiman = Pimic
  6. Taracahitic
  7. Tubar
  8. Corachol
  9. Aztecan
24. Wakashan
  1. Kwakiutlan
  2. Nootkan
25. Wintuan (> Coast Penutian?)
26. Yokutsan
27. Yuman–Cochimi
  1. Yuman
  2. Cochimi

**Isolates**

1. Adai
2. Alsea [alsi] (> Coast Penutian?)
3. Atakapa (> Tunican?)
4. Beothuk (unclassifiable?)
5. Cayuse
6. Chimariko
7. Chitimacha (> Tunican?)
8. Coahuilteco
9. Cotoname = Carrizo de Camargo
10. Esselen
11. Haida
12. Karankawa
13. Karuk
14. Keres
15. Klamath-Modoc
16. Kootenai
17. Molala
18. Natchez
19. Salinan
20. Siuslaw (> Coast Penutian?)
21. Takelma
22. Timucua
23. Tonkawa
24. Tunica (> Tunican?)
25. Wappo (> Yuki–Wappo)
26. Washo
27. Yana
28. Yuchi (> Siouan)
29. Yuki (> Yuki–Wappo)
30. Zuni

**Stocks**

- Yuki–Wappo, supported by Elmendorf (1981, 1997)

The unity of Penutian languages outside Mexico is considered probable by many linguists:

- Penutian
1. Tsimshianic
2. Chinookan
3. Takelma
4. Kalapuya (not close to Takelma: Tarpent & Kendall 1998)
5. Maidun
6. Oregon Coast-Wintu (Whistler 1977, Golla 1997)
  1. Alsea
  2. Coosan
  3. Siuslaw
  4. Wintuan
7. Plateau
  1. Sahaptian
  2. Klamath
  3. Molala
  4. Cayuse ? (poor data)
8. Yok-Utian ?
  1. Yana
  2. Yana

Siouan–Yuchi "probable"; Macro-Siouan likely:

- Macro-Siouan
1. Iroquoian–Caddoan
  1. Iroquoian
  2. Caddoan
2. Siouan–Yuchi
  1. Siouan–Catawban
  2. Yuchi

Natchez–Muskogean most likely of the Gulf hypothesis

- Natchez–Muskogean
1. Natchez
2. Muskogean

Hokan: most promising proposals

- Hokan
1. Karok
2. Chimariko
3. Shastan
4. Palaihnihan
5. Yana
6. Washo
7. Pomoan
8. Esselen
9. Salinan
10. Yuman–Cochimi
11. Seri

"Unlikely" to be Hokan:

Chumashan
Tonkawa
Karankawa

Subtiaba–Tlapanec is likely part of Otomanguean (Rensch 1977, Oltrogge 1977).

Aztec–Tanoan is "undemonstrated"; Mosan is a Sprachbund.

=== Campbell (2024) ===
Lyle Campbell (2024) proposed the following list of 30 uncontroversial indigenous language families and 24 isolates north of Mexico – a total of 54 independent families and isolates. Language families deemed major are highlighted in bold. The remaining language families all considered small.

Families

1. **Algic** (c. 54)
2. **Caddoan** (5)
3. **Cochimi-Yuman** (12)
4. **Eskimo-Aleut** (13)
5. **Iroquoian** (13)
6. **Kiowa-Tanoan** (7)
7. **Muskogean** (7)
8. **Na-Dene** (c. 47)
9. **Plateau** (4)
10. **Salishan** (23)
11. **Siouan-Catawban** (17)
12. **Utian** (15)
13. **Uto-Aztecan** (c. 48, of which c. 16 are in Mexico and Central America)
14. **Wakashan** (6)
15. Chimakuan (2) †
16. Chinookan (3) †
17. Chumashan (6) †
18. Comecrudan (3) †
19. Coosan (2) †
20. Kalapuyan (3) †
21. Keresan (2)
22. Maiduan (4) †
23. Palaihnihan (2) †
24. Pomoan (7) †
25. Salinan (2) †
26. Shastan (3~4) †
27. Tsimshianic (4)
28. Wintuan (2) †
29. Yokutsan (6~7)
30. Yukian (2) †

Isolates

1. Adai †
2. Alsea †
3. Atakapa †
4. Beothuk †
5. Cayuse †
6. Chimariko †
7. Chitimacha †
8. Coahuilteco †
9. Cotoname †
10. Esselen †
11. Haida
12. Karankawa †
13. Karuk
14. Kootenai
15. Natchez †
16. Siuslaw †
17. Takelma †
18. Tonkawa †
19. Timucua †
20. Tunica †
21. Washo
22. Yana †
23. Yuchi †
24. Zuni

== Mesoamerica ==
(Consensus conservative classification)

Families

- Uto-Aztecan (Other branches outside Mesoamerica. See North America) languages

1. Corachol (Cora–Huichol)
2. Aztecan (Nahua–Pochutec)

- Totonac–Tepehua
- Otomanguean

1. Otopamean
2. Popolocan–Mazatecan
3. Subtiaba–Tlapanec
4. Amuzgo
5. Mixtecan
6. Chatino–Zapotec
7. Chinantec
8. Chiapanec–Mangue (extinct)

- Tequistlatecan
- Mixe–Zoque
- Mayan
- Jicaquean
- Misumalpan (Outside Mesoamerica proper. See South America)
- Chibchan (Outside Mesoamerica proper. See South America)

1. Paya

Isolates

- Purépecha
- Cuitlatec (extinct)
- Huave
- Xinca (extinct)
- Lenca (extinct)

Proposed stocks

- Hokan (see North America)

1. Tequistlatec-Jicaque

- Macro-Mayan (Penutian affiliation now considered doubtful.)

1. Totonac–Tepehua
2. Huave
3. Mixe–Zoque
4. Mayan

- Macro-Chibchan

1. Chibchan
2. Misumalpan
3. Xinca
4. Lenca

== South America ==
Notable early classifications of classifications of indigenous South American language families include those by Filippo Salvatore Gilii (1780–84), Lorenzo Hervás y Panduro (1784–87), Daniel Garrison Brinton (1891), Paul Rivet (1924), John Alden Mason (1950), and Čestmír Loukotka (1968). Other classifications include those of Jacinto Jijón y Caamaño (1940–45), Antonio Tovar (1961; 1984), and Jorge A. Suárez (1974).

=== Glottolog 4.1 (2019) ===
Glottolog 4.1 (2019) recognizes 44 independent families and 64 isolates in South America.

South American languages families proposed in Glottolog 4.1

Families (44)

1. Arawakan (78)
2. Tupian (71)
3. Pano-Tacanan (45)
4. Quechuan (45)
5. Cariban (42)
6. Mayan (33)
7. Nuclear-Macro-Jê (30)
8. Chibchan (27)
9. Tucanoan (26)
10. Chapacuran (12)
11. Chocoan (9)
12. Huitotoan (7)
13. Matacoan (7)
14. Arawan (6)
15. Barbacoan (6)
16. Nambiquaran (6)
17. Zaparoan (6)
18. Guahiboan (5)
19. Guaicuruan (5)
20. Lengua-Mascoy (5)
21. Yanomamic (5)
22. Aymaran (4)
23. Chicham (4)
24. Chonan (4)
25. Jodi-Saliban (4)
26. Kamakanan (4)
27. Naduhup (4)
28. Bororoan (3)
29. Cahuapanan (3)
30. Charruan (3)
31. Kawesqar (3)
32. Peba-Yagua (3)
33. Zamucoan (3)
34. Araucanian (2)
35. Boran (2)
36. Harakmbut (2)
37. Hibito-Cholon (2)
38. Huarpean (2)
39. Kakua-Nukak (2)
40. Katukinan (2)
41. Otomaco-Taparita (2)
42. Puri-Coroado (2)
43. Ticuna-Yuri (2)
44. Uru-Chipaya (2)

Isolates (64)

1. Aewa
2. Aikanã
3. Andaqui
4. Andoque
5. Arutani
6. Atacame
7. Betoi-Jirara
8. Camsá
9. Candoshi-Shapra
10. Canichana
11. Cayubaba
12. Chiquitano
13. Chono
14. Cofán
15. Culli
16. Fulniô
17. Guachi
18. Guamo
19. Guató
20. Irántxe-Münkü
21. Itonama
22. Jirajaran
23. Kanoê
24. Kariri
25. Kunza
26. Kwaza
27. Leco
28. Lule
29. Máku
30. Matanawí
31. Mato Grosso Arára
32. Mochica
33. Mosetén-Chimané
34. Movima
35. Muniche
36. Mure
37. Omurano
38. Oti
39. Páez
40. Pankararú
41. Payagua
42. Pirahã
43. Puelche
44. Puinave
45. Pumé
46. Puquina
47. Ramanos
48. Sapé
49. Sechuran
50. Tallán
51. Taruma
52. Taushiro
53. Timote-Cuica
54. Tinigua
55. Trumai
56. Tuxá
57. Urarina
58. Vilela
59. Waorani
60. Warao
61. Xukurú
62. Yámana
63. Yuracaré
64. Yurumanguí

=== Rivet (1924) ===
Paul Rivet (1924) lists 77 independent language families of South America.

1. Alakaluf
2. Al'entiak
3. Amuesha
4. Araukan
5. Arawak
6. Arda (spurious)
7. Atakama
8. Atal'an
9. Auaké
10. Aymará
11. Bororó
12. Diagit
13. Enimaga
14. Esmeralda
15. Guahibo
16. Guarauno
17. Guató
18. Guaykurú
19. Het (Chechehet)
20. Huari
21. Itonama
22. Kahuapana
23. Kaliána
24. Kañari
25. Kanichana
26. Karajá (Karayá)
27. Karib
28. Karirí
29. Katukina
30. Kayuvava
31. Kichua
32. Koche (Mokóa)
33. Kofane
34. Leko
35. Maku (Nadahup)
36. Maskoi
37. Mashubi
38. Matako-Mataguayo
39. Mobima
40. Moseten
41. Múra
42. Nambikuára
43. Otomak
44. Pano
45. Puelche
46. Puinave
47. Puruhá
48. Sáliba
49. Samuku
50. Sanaviron
51. Shavanté
52. Sek
53. Shirianá
54. Timote
55. Trumaí
56. Chapakura
57. Charrúa
58. Chibcha
59. Chikito
60. Chirino
61. Choko
62. Cholona
63. Chon
64. Tukáno
65. Tupi-Guaraní
66. Tuyuneiri
67. Vilela-Chulupí
68. Witóto
69. Xíbaro (Shiwora, Shuara)
70. Xiraxara
71. Yahgan
72. Yaruro
73. Yunka
74. Yurakáre
75. Yuri
76. Záparo
77. Je (Ge)

=== Mason (1950) ===
Classification of South American languages by J. Alden Mason (1950):

Chibchan

- Western
  - Talamanca
  - Barbacoa
    - Pasto
    - Cayapa-Colorado
  - Guatuso
  - Cuna
- Pacific
  - Isthmian (Guaymí)
  - Colombian
- Inter-Andine
  - Páez
  - Coconuco
  - Popayanense
- Eastern
  - Cundinamarca
  - Arhuaco
  - Central America
  - ? Andakí (Andaquí)
  - ? Betoi group

Languages probably of Chibchan affinities

- Panzaleo
- Cara, Caranki
- Kijo (Quijo)
- Misumalpan
- Cofán (Kofane)

Languages of doubtful Chibchan relationships

- Coche (Mocoa)
- Esmeralda
- Tairona, Chimila
- Yurumanguí
- Timote
- Candoshi, Chirino, Murato
- Cholón
- Híbito
- Copallén
- Aconipa (Akonipa)

Language families of central South America

- Yunca-Puruhán
  - Yunca
  - Puruhá
  - Cañari (Canyari)
  - Atalán
  - Sec (Sechura, Tallán)
- Kechumaran
  - Quechua
  - Aymara
- Chiquitoan
- Macro-Guaicuruan
  - Mataco-Macá
    - Mataco
    - Macá (Enimagá, Cochaboth)
  - Guaicurú (Waicurú)
- Lule-Vilelan
  - Tonocoté, Matará, Guacará

Arawakan

- Chané, Chaná

Languages of probable Arawakan affinities

- Arauá group
- Apolista (Lapachu)
- Amuesha
- Tucuna (Tikuna)
- Tarumá
- Tacana

Languages of possible Arawakan relationships

- Tuyuneri
- Jirajara
- Jívaro
- Uru-Chipaya-Pukina
  - Ochosuma
  - Chango, Coast Uru

Cariban

Languages of probable Cariban affiliations

- Chocó, Cariban of Colombia
- Peba-Yagua
  - Arda
- Yuma
- Palmella
- Yuri (Juri)
- Pimenteira

Macro-Tupí-Guaranian

- Tupí-Guaranian
  - Yurimagua (Zurimagua)
- Arikem
- Miranyan (Boran)
- Witotoan
  - Nonuya
  - Muenane
  - Fitita
  - Orejón
  - Coeruna
  - Andoke
  - Resigero
- Záparoan
  - Omurano (Roamaina?)
  - Sabela
  - Canelo
  - Awishira

Northern tropical lowland independent families

- Warrauan
- Auakéan
- Calianan
- Macuan
- Shirianán
- Sálivan, Macu, Piaróa
- Pamigua, Tinigua
- Otomacan, Guamo (Guama), Yaruran
- Guahiban
- Puinavean (Macú)
- Tucanoan (Betoyan)
  - Coto
- Cahuapanan
  - Muniche
- Panoan
  - Chama languages
  - Cashibo
  - Mayoruna
  - Itucale, Simacu, Urarina
  - Aguano
  - Chamicuro

Southern tropical lowland independent families

- Unclassified languages of Eastern Perú: Alon, Amasifuin, Carapacho, Cascoasoa, Chedua, Cholto, Chunanawa, Chusco, Cognomona, Chupacho, Huayana, Kikidcana (Quiquidcana), Moyo-pampa, Nindaso, Nomona, Pantahua, Payanso, Tepqui, Tingan, Tulumayo, Zapazo
- Small "families" of Bolivia: Itonama, Canichana, Cayuvava, Movima, Moseten, Leco, Yuracare
- Small languages of the Brazil-Bolivia border: Huari, Masáca, Capishaná, Puruborá, Mashubi, Kepikiriwat, Sanamaicá, Tuparí, Guaycarú, Aricapu, Yaputi, Aruashí, Canoa
- Catukinan
- Chapacuran: Wanyam (Huañam), Cabishí (Kabichi)
- Mascoian
- Zamucoan
- Guatoan
- Bororoan, Otuke
  - Coraveca, Covareca
  - Curucaneca, Curuminaca
- Nambicuaran
  - Cabishí
- Muran
  - Matanawí
- Trumaian
- Caraján
- Caririan

Macro-Jê

- Jê
- Caingang
- Camacán, Mashacalí, Purí (Coroado)
  - Camacán
  - Mashacalí
  - Purí (Coroado)
- Patashó
- Malalí
- Coropó
- Botocudo

Other language families of eastern Brazil

- Shavanté (Chavanté, Šavante)
  - Otí
  - Opayé
  - Cucurá
- Guaitacán
- Small languages of the Pernambuco region: Fulnió, Natú, Pancãrurú, Shocó, Shucurú, Tushá, Carapató, Payacú, Teremembé, Tarairiu (Ochucayana)

Southernmost languages

- Ataguitan
  - Atacama
  - Omawaca (Omahuaca)
  - Diaguita (Calchaquí)
- Charrua, Kerandí, Chaná, etc.
- Allentiac (Huarpean)
- Sanavirón, Comechingónan
  - Sanavirón
  - Comechingón
- Araucanian
  - Chono
- Puelchean
  - Het (Chechehet)
- Chonan (Tewelche, Tehuelche), Selkʼnam
- Yahganan
- Alacalufan

=== Loukotka (1968) ===
Čestmír Loukotka (1968) proposed a total of 117 indigenous language families (called stocks by Loukotka) and isolates of South America.

Languages of Paleo-American tribes

- A. Southern Division
  - 1. Yámana
  - 2. Alacaluf
  - 3. Aksanás
  - 4. Patagon
  - 5. Gennaken
  - 6. Chechehet
  - 7. Sanaviron
- B. Chaco Division
  - 8. Guaicuru
  - 9. Vilela
  - 10. Mataco
  - 11. Lengua
  - 12. Zamuco
  - 13. Chiquito
  - 14. Gorgotoqui
  - Unclassified or unknown languages of the areas of Divisions A and B.
- C. Division of Central Brazil
  - 15. Charrua
  - 16. Kaingán
  - 17. Opaie
  - 18. Puri
  - 19. Mashakali
  - 20. Botocudo
  - 21. Baenan
  - 22. Kamakan
  - 23. Fulnio
  - 24. Jê
  - 25. Kukura [spurious]
  - 26. Otí
  - 27. Boróro
  - 28. Karajá
  - Unclassified or unknown languages of the area of Division C.
- D. Northeastern Division
  - 29. Katembri
  - 30. Tushá
  - 31. Pankarurú
  - 32. Chocó
  - 33. Umán
  - 34. Natú
  - 35. Shukurú
  - 36. Kiriri
  - 37. Tarairiú
  - 38. Gamela
  - Unclassified or unknown languages of the area of Division D.
- E. Northwestern Division
  - 39. Múra
  - 40. Matanawí
  - 41. Erikbaktsa
  - 42. Nambikwára
  - 43. Iranshe
  - 44. Yabutí

Languages of tropical forest tribes

- A. North Central Division
  - 45. Tupi
  - 46. Arawak
  - 47. Otomac
  - 48. Guamo
  - 49. Taruma
  - 50. Piaroa
  - 51. Tinigua
  - 52. Máku
  - 53. Tucuna
  - 54. Yagua
  - 55. Kahuapana
  - 56. Munichi
  - 57. Cholona
  - 58. Mayna
  - 59. Murato
  - 60. Auishiri
  - 61. Itucale
  - 62. Jíbaro
  - 63. Sabela
  - 64. Záparo
  - 65. Chapacura
  - 66. Huari
  - 67. Capixana
  - 68. Koaiá
  - 69. Purubora
  - 70. Trumai
  - 71. Cayuvava
  - 72. Mobima
  - 73. Itonama
  - 74. Canichana
  - Unclassified or unknown languages of the area of the North Central Division.
- B. South Central Division
  - 75. Pano
  - 76. Tacana
  - 77. Toyeri
  - 78. Yuracare
  - 79. Mosetene
  - 80. Guató
  - Unclassified or unknown languages of the area of the South Central Division.
- C. Languages of the Central Division
  - 81. Tucano
  - 82. Andoque
  - 83. Uitoto
  - 84. Bora
  - 85. Yuri
  - 86. Makú (Nadahup)
  - 87. Catuquina
  - 88. Arawa
  - Unclassified or unknown languages of the area of the Central Division.
- D. Northeastern Division
  - 89. Karaib
  - 90. Yanoama
  - 91. Uarao
  - 92. Auaké
  - 93. Kaliána
  - Unclassified or unknown languages of the area of the North Eastern Division.

Languages of Andean tribes

- A. Northern Division
  - 94. Chibcha
  - 95. Timote
  - 96. Jirajara
  - 97. Chocó
  - 98. Idabaez
  - Unclassified or unknown division.
- B. North Central Division
  - 99. Yurimangui
  - 100. Cofán
  - 101. Sechura
  - 102. Catacao
  - 103. Culli
  - 104. Tabancale
  - 105. Copallén
  - 106. Chimú
- C. South Central Division
  - 107. Quechua
  - 108. Aymara
  - 109. Puquina
  - 110. Uro
  - 111. Atacama
  - 112. Leco
  - Unclassified or unknown languages of the area of the Ancient Inca Empire.
- D. Southern Division
  - 113. Mapuche
  - 114. Diaguit
  - 115. Humahuaca
  - 116. Lule
  - 117. Huarpe

=== Kaufman (1990) ===
==== Families and isolates ====
Terrence Kaufman's classification is meant to be a rather conservative genetic grouping of the languages of South America (and a few in Central America). He has 118 genetic units. Kaufman believes for these 118 units "that there is little likelihood that any of the groups recognized here will be broken apart". Kaufman uses more specific terminology than only language family, such as language area, emergent area, and language complex, where he recognizes issues such as partial mutual intelligibility and dialect continuums. The list below collapses these into simply families. Kaufman's list is numbered and grouped by "geolinguistic region". The list below is presented in alphabetic order. Kaufman uses an anglicized orthography for his genetic units, which is mostly used only by himself. His spellings have been retained below.

Families:

1. Aimoré
2. Arawán
3. Barbakóan
4. Bóran
5. Boróroan
6. Chapakúran
7. Charrúan
8. Chíbchan
9. Chimúan
10. Chipaya
11. Chokó
12. Cholónan
13. Chon
14. Haki
15. Harákmbut
16. Hiraháran
17. Hívaro
18. Jabutían
19. Jê
20. Kamakánan
21. Karajá
22. Káriban
23. Katakáoan
24. Katukínan
25. Kawapánan
26. Kawéskar
27. Kechua
28. Maipúrean
29. Mashakalían
30. Maskóian
31. Matákoan
32. Misumalpa
33. Mosetén
34. Múran
35. Nambikuara
36. Otomákoan
37. Páesan
38. Pánoan
39. Puinávean
40. Purían
41. Sálivan
42. Samúkoan
43. Sáparoan
44. Takánan
45. Timótean
46. Tiníwan
47. Tukánoan
48. Tupían
49. Wahívoan
50. Waikurúan
51. Warpe
52. Witótoan
53. Yanomáman
54. Yáwan

Isolates or unclassified:

1. Aikaná
2. Andoke
3. Awaké
4. Baenã
5. Betoi
6. Chikitano
7. Ezmeralda
8. Fulnió
9. Gamela
10. Gorgotoki
11. Guató
12. Hotí
13. Iranshe
14. Itonama
15. Jaruro
16. Jeikó
17. Jurí
18. Kaliana
19. Kamsá
20. Kanichana
21. Kapishaná
22. Karirí
23. Katembrí
24. Kayuvava
25. Koayá
26. Kofán
27. Kandoshi
28. Kolyawaya jargon
29. Kukurá
30. Kulyi
31. Kunsa
32. Leko
33. Lule
34. Maku
35. Mapudungu
36. Matanawí
37. Movima
38. Munichi
39. Natú
40. Ofayé
41. Omurano
42. Otí
43. Pankararú
44. Puelche
45. Pukina
46. Rikbaktsá
47. Sabela
48. Sechura
49. Shokó
50. Shukurú
51. Tarairiú
52. Taruma
53. Tekiraka
54. Tikuna
55. Trumai
56. Tushá
57. Urarina
58. Vilela
59. Wamo
60. Wamoé
61. Warao
62. Yámana
63. Yurakare
64. Yurimangi

==== Stocks ====
In addition to his conservative list, Kaufman list several larger "stocks" which he evaluates. The names of the stocks are often obvious hyphenations of two members; for instance, the Páes-Barbakóa stock consists of the Páesan and Barbakóan families. If the composition is not obvious, it is indicated parenthetically. Kaufman puts question marks by Kechumara and Mosetén-Chon stocks.

"Good" stocks:

- Awaké–Kaliana (Arutani–Sape)
- Chibcha–Misumalpa
- Ezmeralda–Jaruro
- Jurí–Tikuna
- Kechumara (=Kechua + Haki) (good?)
- Lule–Vilela
- Mosetén–Chon (good?)
- Páes–Barbakóa
- Pano–Takana
- Sechura–Katakao
- Wamo–Chapakúra

"Probable" stocks:

- Macro-Jê (=Chikitano + Boróroan + Aimoré + Rikbaktsá + Je + Jeikó + Kamakánan + Mashakalían + Purían + Fulnío + Karajá + Ofayé + Guató)
- Mura–Matanawí

"Promising" stocks:

- Kaliánan (=Awaké + Kaliana + Maku)

"Maybe" stocks:

- Bora–Witoto
- Hívaro–Kawapana
- Kunsa–Kapishaná (now abandoned)
- Pukina–Kolyawaya
- Sáparo–Yawa

==== Clusters and networks ====
Kaufman's largest groupings are what he terms clusters and networks. Clusters are equivalent to macro-families (or phyla or superfamilies). Networks are composed of clusters. Kaufman views all of these larger groupings to be hypothetical and his list is to be used as a means to identify which hypotheses most need testing.

=== Campbell (2012) ===
Lyle Campbell (2012) proposed the following list of 53 uncontroversial indigenous language families and 55 isolates of South America – a total of 108 independent families and isolates. Language families with 9 or more languages are highlighted in bold. The remaining language families all have 6 languages or fewer.

Families

1. **Arawakan** (Maipurean, Maipuran) (~65) – widespread
2. **Cariban** (~40) – Brazil, Venezuela, Colombia, etc.
3. **Chapacuran** (Txapakúran) (9) – Brazil, Bolivia
4. **Chibchan** (23) – Colombia, Venezuela, Panama, Costa Rica
5. **Jêan** (12) – Brazil
6. **Pano–Takanan** (~30) – Brazil, Peru, Bolivia
7. **Makúan** (Makú–Puinavean, Puinavean, Guaviaré–Japurá) (8) – Brazil, Colombia, Venezuela
8. **Quechuan** (23 ?) – Colombia, Ecuador, Peru, Bolivia, Argentina
9. **Tukanoan** (Tucanoan) (~20) – Colombia, Ecuador, Peru, Brazil
10. **Tupían** (~55) – Brazil, Paraguay, Bolivia, etc.
11. Arawan (Arahuan, Arauan, Arawán) (6) – Brazil, Peru
12. Aymaran (2) – Bolivia, Peru
13. Barbacoan (5) – Colombia, Ecuador
14. Bororoan (3) – Brazil
15. Cahuapanan (2) – Peru
16. Cañar–Puruhá (2; uncertain) – Ecuador
17. Charruan (3) – Uruguay, Argentina
18. Chipaya–Uru (3) – Bolivia
19. Chocoan (2–6) – Colombia, Panama
20. Cholonan (2) – Peru
21. Chonan (Chon) (3) – Argentina
22. Guaicuruan (Waykuruan) (5) – Argentina, Paraguay, Brazil
23. Guajiboan (4) – Colombia
24. Harákmbut–Katukinan (3; uncertain) – Peru, Brazil
25. Huarpean (Warpean) (2) – Argentina
26. Jabutían (2) – Brazil
27. Jirajaran (3) – Venezuela
28. Jivaroan (4 ?) – Peru, Ecuador
29. Kamakanan (5 ?) – Brazil
30. Karajá (2 ?) – Brazil
31. Karirian (Karirí) (4) – Brazil
32. Krenákan (Botocudoan, Aimoré) (3) – Brazil
33. Lule–Vilelan (2) – Argentina
34. Mascoyan (4) – Paraguay
35. Matacoan (4) – Argentina, Paraguay, Bolivia
36. Maxakalían (3) – Brazil
37. Mosetenan (2) – Bolivia
38. Muran (4, only 1 living) – Brazil
39. Nambikwaran (5 ?) – Brazil
40. Qawasqaran (Kaweskaran, Alacalufan) (2–3) – Chile
41. Otomacoan (2) – Venezuela
42. Paezan (1–3; isolate ?) – Colombia
43. Purían (2) – Brazil
44. Sáliban (Sálivan) (3 ?) – Venezuela, Colombia
45. Sechura–Catacaoan (3) – Peru
46. Timotean (2) – Venezuela
47. Tikuna–Yuri – Peru, Colombia, Brazil
48. Tiniguan (2) – Colombia
49. Yaguan (3) – Peru
50. Witotoan (Huitotoan) (5) – Colombia, Peru
51. Yanomaman (4) – Venezuela, Brazil
52. Zamucoan (2) – Paraguay, Bolivia
53. Zaparoan (3) – Peru, Ecuador

Isolates

1. Aikaná – Brazil
2. Andaquí – Colombia
3. Andoque (Andoke) – Colombia, Peru
4. Atacameño (Cunza, Kunza, Atacama, Lipe) – Chile, Bolivia, Argentina
5. Awaké (Ahuaqué, Uruak) – Venezuela, Brazil
6. Baenan – Brazil
7. Betoi – Colombia (small family ?)
8. Camsá (Sibundoy, Coche) – Colombia
9. Candoshi (Candoxi, Maina, Shapra, Murato) – Peru
10. Canichana – Bolivia
11. Cayuvava (Cayuwaba, Cayubaba) – Bolivia
12. Chiquitano – Bolivia
13. Chono – Chile
14. Cofán (A’ingaé) – Colombia, Ecuador
15. Culle – Peru
16. Gamela – Brazil
17. Guachí – Brazil
18. Guató – Brazil
19. Irantxe (Iranche, Münkü) – Brazil
20. Itonama (Saramo, Machoto) – Bolivia, Brazil
21. Jeikó (Jeicó, Jaiko) – Brazil (Macro–Jêan ?)
22. Jotí (Yuwana) – Venezuela
23. Kaliana (Sapé, Caliana, Cariana, Chirichano) – Venezuela
24. Kapixaná (Kanoé) – Brazil
25. Koayá (Kwaza, Koaiá, Arara) – Brazil
26. Máku – Brazil
27. Mapudungu (Mapudungun, Araucano, Mapuche, Maputongo) – Chile, Argentina
28. Matanauí – Brazil
29. Mochica (Yunga, Yunca, Chimú, Mochica, Muchic) – Peru
30. Movima – Bolivia
31. Munichi (Muniche, Munichino, Otanabe) – Peru
32. Natú (Peagaxinan) – Brazil
33. Ofayé (Opayé, Ofayé–Xavante) – Brazil (Macro–Jêan ?)
34. Omurano (Humurana, Numurana) – Peru
35. Otí – Brazil
36. Pankararú (Pancararu, Pancarurú, Brancararu) – Brazil
37. Payaguá – Paraguay
38. Puquina – Bolivia
39. Rikbaktsá (Aripaktsá, Eribatsa, Eripatsa, Canoeiro) – Brazil (Macro–Jêan ?)
40. Sabela (Huao, Auca, Huaorani, Auishiri) – Ecuador
41. Taruma (Taruamá) – Brazil, Guyana
42. Taushiro (Pinchi, Pinche) – Peru
43. Tequiraca (Tekiraka, Aushiri, Auishiri, Avishiri) – Peru
44. Trumai (Trumaí) – Brazil
45. Tuxá – Brazil
46. Urarina (Simacu, Kachá, Itucale) – Peru
47. Wamoé (Huamoé, Huamoi, Uamé, Umã; Araticum, Atikum) – Brazil
48. Warao (Guarao, Warau, Guaruno) – Guyana, Suriname, Venezuela
49. Xokó – Brazil
50. Xukurú – Brazil
51. Yagan (Yaghan, Yamana, Yámana) – Chile
52. Yaruro (Pumé, Llaruro, Yaruru, Yuapín) – Venezuela
53. Yaté (Furniô, Fornió, Carnijó; Iatê) – Brazil
54. Yuracaré – Bolivia
55. Yurumangui – Colombia

Campbell (2012) leaves out the classifications of these languages as uncertain.

- Boran – Brazil, Colombia
- Esmeralda – Ecuador
- Guamo – Venezuela
- Leko – Bolivia
- Mure – Bolivia
- Puinave – Colombia, Venezuela

=== Jolkesky (2016) ===
Jolkesky (2016) lists 43 language families and 66 language isolates (and/or unclassified languages) in South America – a total of 109 independent families and isolates.

- † = extinct

Families

1. Andoke-Urekena
2. Arawa
3. Barbakoa
4. Bora-Muinane
5. Chacha-Cholon-Hibito
6. Chapakura-Wañam
7. Charrua
8. Chibcha
9. Choko
10. Chon
11. Duho
12. Guahibo
13. Harakmbet-Katukina
14. Jaqi
15. Jirajara †
16. Jivaro
17. Karib
18. Kawapana
19. Kechua
20. Lengua-Maskoy
21. Macro-Arawak
22. Macro-Mataguayo-Guaykuru
23. Macro-Jê
24. Mapudungun
25. Moseten-Tsimane
26. Mura-Matanawi
27. Nambikwara
28. Otomako-Taparita †
29. Pano-Takana
30. Peba-Yagua
31. Puinave-Nadahup
32. Puri †
33. Tallan †
34. Timote-Kuika
35. Tinigua-Pamigua
36. Tukano
37. Tupi
38. Uru-Chipaya
39. Warpe †
40. Witoto-Okaina
41. Yanomami
42. Zamuko
43. Zaparo

Isolates and unclassified languages

1. Aikanã
2. Andaki †
3. Arara do Rio Branco
4. Arutani
5. Atakame †
6. Atikum †
7. Aushiri †
8. Chono †
9. Guamo †
10. Guato
11. Gününa Këna
12. Iranche/Myky
13. Itonama
14. Kakan †
15. Kamsa
16. Kañari †
17. Kanichana
18. Kanoe
19. Kawesqar
20. Kayuvava
21. Kerandi †
22. Kimbaya †
23. Kingnam †
24. Kofan
25. Komechingon †
26. Koraveka †
27. Kueva †
28. Kulle †
29. Kunza †
30. Kuruminaka †
31. Kwaza
32. Leko
33. Lule †
34. Maku
35. Malibu †
36. Mochika †
37. Mokana †
38. Morike †
39. Movima
40. Muzo-Kolima †
41. Omurano
42. Oti †
43. Paez
44. Panche †
45. Pijao †
46. Puruha †
47. Sanaviron †
48. Sape
49. Sechura †
50. Tarairiu †
51. Taruma
52. Taushiro
53. Tekiraka
54. Trumai
55. Tuxa †
56. Umbra
57. Urarina
58. Vilela
59. Waorani
60. Warao
61. Xukuru †
62. Yagan
63. Yaruro
64. Yurakare
65. Yurumangui †
66. Zenu †

Creoles, pidgins, and secret languages

1. Kallawaya
2. Maskoy Pidgin
3. Media Lengua
4. Ndyuka-Tiriyo

=== Campbell (2024) ===
Lyle Campbell (2024) proposed the following list of 47 uncontroversial indigenous language families and 53 isolates of South America – a total of 100 independent families and isolates. Language families with more than 6 languages are highlighted in bold. The remaining language families all have 6 languages or fewer.

Families

1. **Arawakan** (Maipurean, Maipuran) (~65–80) – widespread
2. **Cariban** (~40–50) – Brazil, Venezuela, Colombia, etc.
3. **Chapacuran** (Txapakúran) (10) – Brazil, Bolivia
4. **Chibchan** (23) – Colombia, Venezuela, Panama, Costa Rica
5. **Macro-Jê Sensu Stricto** (~33) – Brazil
6. **Pano–Takanan** (~39) – Brazil, Peru, Bolivia
7. **Quechuan** (23 ?) – Colombia, Ecuador, Peru, Bolivia, Argentina
8. **Tukanoan** (Tucanoan) (~29, 8 extinct) – Colombia, Ecuador, Peru, Brazil
9. **Tupían** (~55–70) – Brazil, Paraguay, Bolivia, etc.
10. Arawan (Arahuan, Arauan, Arawán) (6?) – Brazil, Peru
11. Aymaran (2) – Bolivia, Peru
12. Barbacoan (5) – Colombia, Ecuador
13. Boran (3) – Brazil, Colombia
14. Bororoan (3) – Brazil
15. Cahuapanan (3, possibly 2) – Peru
16. Cañar–Puruhá (2; uncertain) – Ecuador
17. Charruan (3) – Uruguay, Argentina
18. Chicham (4) – Peru, Ecuador
19. Chocoan (3?) – Colombia, Panama
20. Cholonan (2) – Peru
21. Chonan (Chon) (5–6?) – Argentina
22. Enlhet–Enenlhet Mascoyan (6) – Paraguay
23. Guaicuruan (Waykuruan) (5) – Argentina, Paraguay, Brazil
24. Guajiboan (4) – Colombia
25. Harákmbut–Katukinan (4) – Peru, Brazil
26. Huarpean (Warpean) (2) – Argentina
27. Jirajaran (3) – Venezuela
28. Kakua–Nukak (2) – Colombia, Brazil
29. Karirian (Karirí) (4) – Brazil
30. Kaweskaran (Qawasqaran, Alacalufan) (3?) – Chile
31. Lule–Vilelan (2) – Argentina
32. Mapudungun (Mapudungu, Araucano, Mapuche, Maputongo) (2) – Chile, Argentina
33. Matacoan (4) – Argentina, Paraguay, Bolivia
34. Nadahup (4) – Colombia, Venezuela, Brazil
35. Nambikwaran (4 ?) – Brazil
36. Otomacoan (2) – Venezuela
37. Sáliban (Sálivan) (3 ?) – Venezuela, Colombia
38. Tallán (2) – Peru
39. Tikuna–Yuri (3) – Peru, Colombia, Brazil
40. Timotean (2) – Venezuela
41. Tiniguan (2) – Colombia
42. Uru–Chipaya (3) – Bolivia
43. Yaguan (3) – Peru
44. Witotoan (Huitotoan) (5) – Colombia, Peru
45. Yanomaman (4) – Venezuela, Brazil
46. Zamucoan (2) – Paraguay, Bolivia
47. Zaparoan (3–8?) – Peru, Ecuador

Isolates

1. Aikaná – Brazil
2. Andaquí – Colombia
3. Andoque (Andoke) – Colombia, Peru
4. Arara do Rio Branco – Brazil
5. Arutani (Ahuaqué, Uruak) – Venezuela, Brazil
6. Atacameño (Cunza, Kunza, Atacama, Lipe) – Chile, Bolivia, Argentina
7. Betoi–Jirara – Colombia
8. Candoshi (Candoxi, Maina, Shapra, Murato) – Peru
9. Canichana – Bolivia
10. Cayuvava (Cayuwaba, Cayubaba) – Bolivia
11. Chiquitano – Bolivia
12. Chono – Chile
13. Cofán (A'ingaé) – Colombia, Ecuador
14. Culle – Peru
15. Esmeralda – Ecuador
16. Guachí – Brazil
17. Guamo – Venezuela
18. Guató – Brazil
19. Iatê (Furniô, Fornió, Carnijó; Yaté) – Brazil
20. Irantxe (Iranche, Münkü) – Brazil
21. Itonama (Saramo, Machoto) – Bolivia, Brazil
22. Jotí (Yuwana) – Venezuela
23. Kamsá (Sibundoy, Coche) – Colombia
24. Kanoê (Kanoé, Kapixaná) – Brazil
25. Kwaza (Koayá, Koaiá, Arara) – Brazil
26. Leko – Bolivia
27. Máku – Brazil
28. Matanawí – Brazil
29. Mochica (Yunga, Yunca, Chimú, Mochica, Muchic) – Peru
30. Moseten–Chimane (Mosetén) – Bolivia
31. Movima – Bolivia
32. Munichi (Muniche, Munichino, Otanabe) – Peru
33. Omurano (Humurana, Numurana) – Peru
34. Paezan (1–3; small family ?) – Colombia
35. Payaguá – Paraguay
36. Pirahã (Muran) (possibly family of close languages) – Brazil
37. Puinave (Wãnsöhöt) – Colombia, Venezuela
38. Purí–Coroado – Brazil
39. Puquina – Bolivia
40. Sapé (Kaliana, Caliana, Cariana, Chirichano) – Venezuela
41. Sechura? – Peru
42. Taruma (Taruamá) – Brazil, Guyana
43. Taushiro (Pinchi, Pinche) – Peru
44. Tequiraca (Tekiraka, Aushiri, Auishiri, Avishiri) – Peru
45. Trumai (Trumaí) – Brazil
46. Urarina (Simacu, Kachá, Itucale) – Peru
47. Waorani (Sabela, Huao, Auca, Huaorani, Auishiri) – Ecuador
48. Warao (Guarao, Warau, Guaruno) – Guyana, Suriname, Venezuela
49. Xukurú – Brazil
50. Yagan (Yaghan, Yamana, Yámana) – Chile
51. Yaruro (Pumé, Llaruro, Yaruru, Yuapín) – Venezuela
52. Yuracaré – Bolivia
53. Yurumangui – Colombia

== All of the Americas ==
=== Swadesh (1960 or earlier) ===
Morris Swadesh further consolidated Sapir's North American classification and expanded it to group all indigenous languages of the Americas in just 6 families, 5 of which were entirely based in the Americas.

1. Vasco-Dene languages included the Eskimo–Aleut, Na-Dene, Wakashan and Kutenai families along with most of the languages of Eurasia.
2. Macro-Hokan roughly comprised a combination of Sapir's Hokan–Siouan and Almosan families and expanded into Central America including the Jicaque language.
3. Macro-Mayan comprising Mayan along with Sapir's Penutian and Aztec-Tanoan families, the Otomanguean languages and various languages of Central and South America including the Chibchan languages, the Paezan languages and the Tucanoan languages.
4. Macro-Quechua comprising the Zuni language, the Purépecha language and various languages of South America including Quechua, the Aymara language, the Panoan languages and most of the various other languages of Patagonia and the Andes.
5. Macro-Carib, an almost entirely South American family including the Carib languages, the Macro-Jê languages and the Jirajara languages, albeit including some Caribbean languages.
6. Macro-Arawak, a family primarily confined to South America and its component families included the Arawakan languages and the Tupian languages. However, it also was proposed to include the Taíno language in the Caribbean and the Timucua language in Florida.

=== Greenberg (1960, 1987) ===
Joseph Greenberg's classification in his 1987 book Language in the Americas is best known for the highly controversial assertion that all North, Central and South American language families other than Eskimo–Aleut and Na-Dene including Haida, are part of an Amerind macrofamily. This assertion of only three major American language macrofamilies is supported by DNA evidence, although the DNA evidence does not provide support for the details of his classification.

Amerind macrofamily proposed by Greenberg
1. Northern Amerind
  1. Almosan–Keresiouan
    1. Almosan
      1. Algic
      2. Kutenai
      3. Mosan
        1. Wakashan
        2. Salish
        3. Chimakuan
    2. Caddoan
    3. Keres
    4. Siouan
    5. Iroquoian
  2. Penutian
    1. California Penutian
      1. Maidu
      2. Miwok–Costanoan
      3. Wintun
      4. Yokuts
    2. Chinook
    3. Mexican Penutian (=Macro-Mayan)
      1. Huave
      2. Mayan
      3. Mixe–Zoque
      4. Totonac
    4. Oregon Penutian
    5. Plateau Penutian
    6. Tsimshian
    7. Yukian
    8. Gulf
      1. Atakapa
      2. Chitimacha
      3. Muskogean
      4. Natchez
      5. Tunica
    9. Zuni
  3. Hokan
    1. Nuclear Hokan
      1. Northern
        1. Karok–Shasta
        2. Yana
        3. Pomo
      2. Washo
      3. Esselen–Yuman
      4. Salinan–Seri
      5. Waicuri
      6. Maratino
      7. Quinigua
      8. Tequistlatec
    2. Coahuiltecan
      1. Tonkawa
      2. Nuclear Coahuiltecan
      3. Karankawa
    3. Subtiaba
    4. Jicaque
    5. Yurumangui
2. Central Amerind
  1. Kiowa–Tanoan
  2. Otomanguean
  3. Uto-Aztecan
3. Chibchan–Paezan
  1. Chibchan
    1. Nuclear Chibchan
      1. Antioquia
      2. Aruak
      3. Chibcha
      4. Cuna
      5. Guaymi
      6. Malibu
      7. Misumalpan
      8. Motilon
      9. Rama
      10. Talamanca
    2. Paya
    3. Purépecha
    4. Xinca
    5. Yanomam
    6. Yunca–Puruhan
  2. Paezan
    1. Allentiac
    2. Atacama
    3. Betoi
    4. Chimu
    5. Itonama
    6. Jirajara
    7. Mura
    8. Nuclear Paezan
      1. Andaqui
      2. Barbacoa
      3. Choco
      4. Paez
    9. Timucua
    10. Warrao
4. Andean (Greenberg (1960) joined Andean and Equatorial, but Greenberg (1987) did not)
  1. Aymara
  2. Itucale–Sabela
    1. Itucale
    2. Mayna
    3. Sabela
  3. Cahuapana–Zaparo
    1. Cahuapano
    2. Zaparo
  4. Northern
    1. Catacao
    2. Cholona
    3. Culli
    4. Leco
    5. Sechura
  5. Quechua
  6. Southern
    1. Qawesqar
    2. Mapundungu
    3. Gennaken
    4. Patagon
    5. Yamana
5. Equatorial–Tucanoan
  1. Equatorial
    1. Macro-Arawakan
      1. Arawakan
      2. Guahibo
      3. Katembri
      4. Otomaco
      5. Tinigua
    2. Cayuvava
    3. Coche
    4. Jivaro–Kandoshi
      1. Cofan
      2. Esmeralda
      3. Jivaro
      4. Kandoshi
      5. Yaruro
    5. Kariri–Tupi
      1. Kariri
      2. Tupian
    6. Piaroa
    7. Taruma
    8. Timote
    9. Trumai
    10. Tusha
    11. Yuracare
    12. Zamucoan
  2. Tucanoan
    1. Auixiri
    2. Canichana
    3. Capixana
    4. Catuquina
    5. Gamella
    6. Huari
    7. Iranshe
    8. Kaliana–Maku
      1. Auake
      2. Kaliana
      3. Maku
    9. Koaia
    10. Movima
    11. Muniche
    12. Nambikwara
    13. Natu
    14. Pankaruru
    15. Puinave
    16. Shukura
    17. Ticuna–Yuri
      1. Ticuna
      2. Yuri
    18. Tucanoan
    19. Uman
6. Jê–Pano–Carib
  1. Macro-Jê
    1. Bororo
    2. Botocudo
    3. Caraja
    4. Chiquito
    5. Erikbatsa
    6. Fulnio
    7. Jê–Kaingang
      1. Jê
      2. Kaingang
    8. Guato
    9. Kamakan
    10. Mashakali
    11. Opaie
    12. Oti
    13. Puri
    14. Yabuti
  2. Macro-Panoan
    1. Charruan
    2. Lengua
    3. Lule–Vilela
      1. Lule
      2. Vilela
    4. Mataco–Guaicuru
      1. Guaicuru
      2. Mataco
    5. Moseten
    6. Pano–Tacanan
      1. Panoan
      2. Tacanan
  3. Macro-Carib
    1. Andoke
    2. Bora–Uitoto
      1. Boro
      2. Uitoto
      3. Carib
      4. Kukura
      5. Yagua

== Mixed languages ==
In American Indian Languages: The Historical Linguistics of Native America, Lyle Campbell describes various pidgins and trade languages spoken by the indigenous peoples of the Americas. Some of these mixed languages have not been documented and are known only by name.

- Medny Aleut (Copper Island Aleut)
- Chinook Jargon
- Broken Slavey (Slavey Jargon)
- Loucheux Jargon
- Michif (French Cree, Métis, Metchif)
- Broken Oghibbeway (Broken Ojibwa)
- Basque-Algonquian Pidgin (spoken by the Basques, Micmacs, and Montagnais in eastern Canada)
- Delaware Jargon
- Pidgin Massachusett
- Jargonized Powhatan
- Lingua Franca Creek
- Lingua Franca Apalachee
- Mobilian Jargon
- Güegüence-Nicarao (formerly spoken in Nicaragua)
- Carib Pidgin or Ndjuka-Amerindian Pidgin (Ndjuka-Trio)
- Carib Pidgin-Arawak mixed language
- Media Lengua
- Catalangu
- Callahuaya (Machaj-Juyai, Kallawaya)
- Nheengatú or Lingua Geral Amazonica ("Lingua Boa," Lingua Brasílica, Lingua Geral do Norte)
- Lingua Geral do Sul or Lingua Geral Paulista (Tupí Austral)
- Labrador Eskimo Pidgin
- Hudson Strait Pidgin Eskimo (spoken from 1750–1850)
- Nootka Jargon (18th–19th centuries; later replaced by Chinook Jargon)
- Trader Navajo
- Yopará (Guaraní-Spanish pidgin)
- Afro-Seminole Creole (variety of Gullah)
- Haida Jargon
- Kutenai Jargon
- Guajiro-Spanish mixed language

Lingua francas

- Ocaneechi (spoken in Virginia and the Carolinas in early colonial times)
- Tuscarora language
- Plains sign language

== See also ==
- Indigenous languages of South America
  - List of indigenous languages of South America
- List of extinct languages of South America
  - Extinct languages of the Marañón River basin
  - List of extinct Uto-Aztecan languages
- List of unclassified languages of South America
  - Category:Unclassified languages of South America
- Classification of indigenous peoples of the Americas
- Classification of Southeast Asian languages
- Intercontinental Dictionary Series
- M–T and N–M pronoun patterns

== Bibliography ==
- See: Indigenous languages of the Americas § Bibliography
