= Janambre language =

Extinct language of Mexico

Janambre
- (unattested)
- Native to: northeast Mexico
- Region: Tamaulipas
- Ethnicity: Janambre
- Extinct: (date missing)
- Language family: unclassified

Language codes
- ISO 639-3: None (mis)
- Glottolog: None

Janambre (Xanambre) is a poorly attested extinct language that was spoken in Tamaulipas, northeast Mexico. It has no apparent relatives and remains unclassified. Campbell (1997), based on William Bright (1955), suggests a relationship with the extinct, unclassified languages Naolan and Tamaulipeco, although no evidence is given. Other languages unclassified extinct languages of Tamaulipas include the language of the Pisones, "Negrito" and Olive, though the Janambre and Pison may have spoken the same language.

== See also ==
- Naolan language
- Tamaulipeco language
- Maratino language
- Quinigua language
- Coahuiltecan languages
