= Santa Rosa language =

Santa Rosa may refer to:

- The Santa Rosa dialect of the Guamo language
- The Santa Rosa dialect of Island Chumash

or any of several other local language varieties.
