= Chavante language =

Chavante may be

- Xavante language
- Otí language
