= Tabancale language =

Extinct language of Peru and Ecuador

Tabancale
- Aconipa, Tabancal, Tabancara
- Native to: Peru, Ecuador
- Region: Aconipa, Cajamarca Department
- Ethnicity: Tabancale people
- Era: 16th century
- Language family: unclassified

Language codes
- ISO 639-3: None (mis)
- Glottolog: taba1269
- Map of the Tabancale language at the time of contact

Tabancale (Tabancal, Aconipa, Tabacanake, Tabancara) is an extinct language formerly spoken in the village of Aconipa, located along the Chinchipe River in the Department of Cajamarca, Peru, as well as in neighboring Ecuador, by the Tabancale people. Only five words were collected in the 16th century and they are not demonstrably related to those in other languages. As a result, it has been categorized as a language isolate by some and left unclassified by others; a connection has been proposed with the Chicham languages, spoken in Peru and Ecuador. The Tabancale people are thought to have switched to Quechua after they were conquered in 1549.

== History ==
The surviving information about the Tabancale people and their language comes from an anonymous document titled Relación de la tierra de Jaén ('Account of the Land of Jaén'). This document was written around 1570 and published by Marcos Jiménez de la Espada as part of the Relaciones geográficas de Indias ('Geographical Accounts of the Indies') of Peru in 1887. The Relaciones were based on a series of responses by parish priests to questionnaires sent out by the Spanish royal government to survey the characteristics of the different regions of its South American territories. According to the account, the language spoken in Aconipa was different from all others. The region had been conquered for the Viceroyalty of Peru by Diego Palomino, who founded the city of Jaén de Bracamoros in 1549 at the mouth of the Chinchipe River. The anthropologists Julian Steward and Alfred Métraux believed that Tabancale speakers eventually assimilated into the rural, Quechua-speaking population after being brought into the encomienda system.

== Geographical distribution ==
Tabancale was reported to be spoken in a single village, Aconipa, "near the upper reaches of the Chinchipe River" in Cajamarca Department near the modern-day Ecuador–Peru border, to the north of San Ignacio in Peru and south of Valladolid in Ecuador. The linguist Čestmír Loukotka put its distribution in both Peru and Ecuador.

== Classification ==
The Tabancale spoke a "different language" from other peoples living in the region, according to the Relación. According to the linguist John Alden Mason, Loukotka was apparently the only one of the compilers of South American Indigenous languages to mention Tabancale at the time; in Loukotka's 1935 classification, he had grouped it as an independent family. The scholar Jacinto Jijón y Caamaño, in his survey of Ecuadorian Indigenous languages, only mentioned the existence of Tabancale, though he left it as "independent" in his 1943 classification. Mason himself found the data on Tabancale "insufficient to warrant its classification, at any rate as a distinct family". Loukotka and the ethnologist Paul Rivet, in their 1952 classification, grouped "Akonipa" as one of their 109 independent language families. Loukotka, in his later 1968 classification, also classified it as a language isolate, as did the linguist Antonio Tovar. According to the linguists Willem Adelaar and Pieter Muysken, the few known Tabancale vocabulary items do not show similarity with other languages; they opt to leave Tabancale unclassified for the same reason. The linguist Matthias Urban identifies a connection with the Chicham languages of Peru and Ecuador, particularly in the word yema 'water' with Chicham yumi 'water', though the linguist Alfredo Torero had previously ascribed this similarity to language contact. Urban also claims that "the remaining vocabulary does not suggest a Chicham affiliation". The linguist Lyle Campbell also considers it unclassified.

== Vocabulary ==
Five words of Tabancale were recorded in the Relaciones geográficas.

Tabancale vocabulary
gloss	Tabancale
water	yema
maize	moa
firewood	oyme
fire	lalaque
house	tie
