= Aztec–Tanoan languages =

North American hypothetical language family

Aztec–Tanoan
- (hypothetical)
- Geographic distribution: central North America
- Linguistic classification: proposed language family
- Subdivisions: Tanoan; Uto-Aztecan; ? Keres; ? Zuni

Language codes
- Glottolog: None
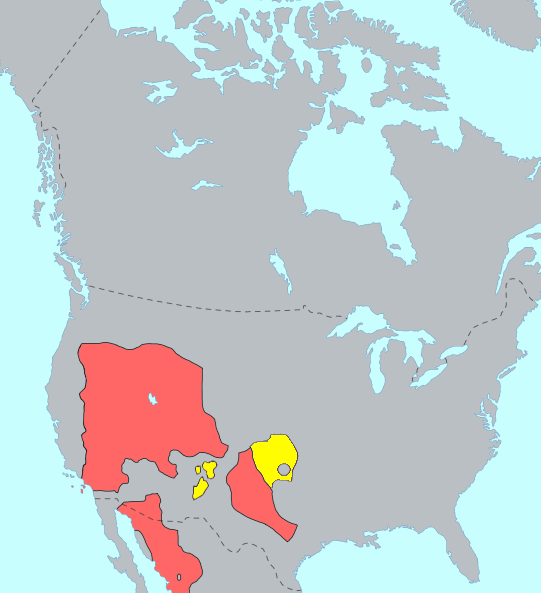
- Pre-contact distribution of hypothetical Aztec-Tanoan family (map does not show the total distribution in Mexico) Uto-Aztecan Tanoan

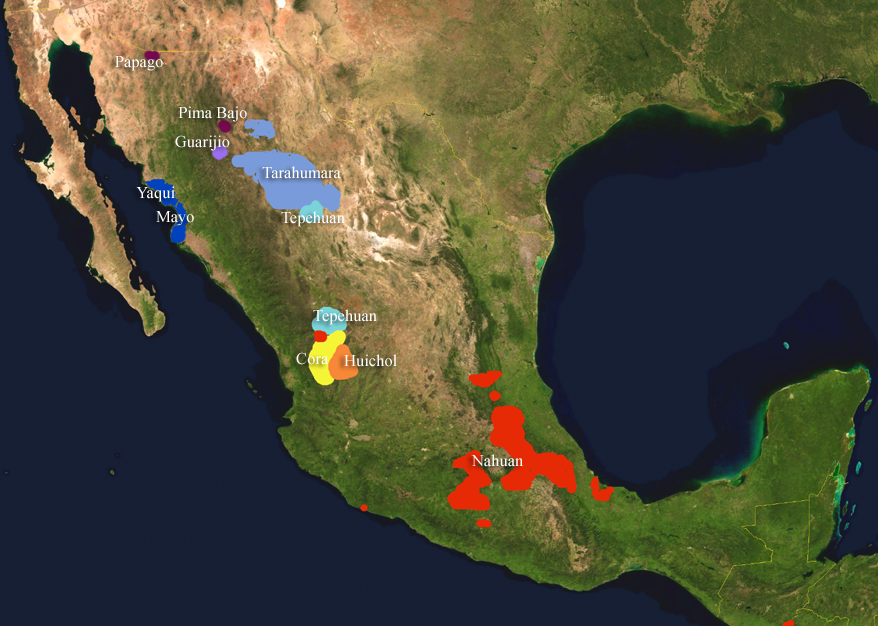
- Uto-Aztecan languages in Mesoamerica

Aztec–Tanoan is a hypothetical and undemonstrated language family that proposes a genealogical relation between the Tanoan and the Uto-Aztecan families. This proposed classification has not been definitively demonstrated, largely because of slow progress in the reconstruction of the intermediate stages of the two language families involved, but is still considered promising by many linguists. The grouping was originally proposed by Edward Sapir in his 1921 classification, but it was not until 1937 that supporting evidence was published by Benjamin Lee Whorf and G. L. Trager. Their proposal included some 67 proposed cognates, but subsequent reviews have found most of them to be unconvincing (monosyllables, onomatopoeia). A small number of their proposed cognates do seem to have some merit and in his 1997 review of the hypothesis Lyle Campbell states that the proposal is not implausible but requires detailed study. A recent article by Jane H. Hill argues that the evidence cited for the genetic relation by Whorf and Trager is better understood as a result of language contact between the Uto-Aztecan and Tanoan proto-languages, with patterns of loanwords suggesting an exchange between Uto-Aztecan agriculturalists and Tanoan hunter-gatherers.

== Proposed cognates ==
The following word pairs are the proposed cognates from Whorf & Trager (1937) and Davis (1979) considered promising by Campbell (1997:273).

- 'stand', Uto-Aztecan wine/wene/wi-; Proto-Tanoan gwine (Whorf & Trager's set 12)
- Uto-Aztecan siwa- 'woman'; Proto-Tanoan liw- (Davis Kiowa-Tanoan *siu) (Whorf & Trager's set 31 / Davis' set 85)
- 'three', Uto-Aztecan pahi; Proto-Tanoan poyuwo (Davis' UA *pahi/*pahayu; Kiowa-Tanoan *podzu(a)/*pocua) (Whorf & Trager's set 73)
- Proto-Numic *pi(h)wi, *pi(h)yi 'heart'; Kiowa-Tanoan *pia (Davis) (Davis' set 3, Whorf & Trager's set 84)
- Uto-Aztecan *pu:la 'tie'; Kiowa-Tanoan *phe, *ph^ 'wrap, tie' (Davis' set 14, Whorf & Tragers' set 87)

== Vocabulary ==
Below is a comparison of selected basic vocabulary items in Proto-Uto-Aztecan and Proto-Kiowa-Tanoan.

| gloss | Proto-Kiowa-Tanoan | Proto-Uto-Aztecan |
|---|---|---|
| hair | *pʰV₂ | *kuppa |
| eye | *cV₄ | *pusi |
| tooth | *dwṼ₅a; *gʷṼ₅ | *tamaC, *tamaN, *taman |
| mouth | *sV₂ | *tï’na > *tï’ni; *tï’nV-pa > *tï’n-pa > *tïmpa |
| hand | *mṼ₁bd- | *man > *ma |
| foot | *ʔṼ₅bn | *kïsa, *kïsica, *kïhisa; *naNpa, *naCp, *nappa |
| breast | *gʷV₃ | *piCti(C); *ciʼi-wa |
| fish | *pV₃ | *paNkwi, *pakkwi, *paC-kuyu, *paC-kucu |
| water | *p’V₁ | *pa / *pa’wi |
| earth | *dṼ₄m 'ground' | *tı̈paC, *tı̈paL; *kwiya, *kwiLa |
| I (1.SG) | *nṼ₁b | *nï |

== Bibliography ==
- Davis, Irvine. 1979. The Kiowa-Tanoan, Keresan, and Zuni languages. In The languages of Native America: historical and comparative assessment, ed. Lyle Campbell and Marianne Mithun, 390-443. Austin: University of Texas Press.
- Campbell, Lyle. (1997). American Indian languages: The historical linguistics of Native America. New York: Oxford University Press. ISBN 0-19-509427-1.
- Campbell, Lyle; & Mithun, Marianne (Eds.). (1979). The languages of native America: Historical and comparative assessment. Austin: University of Texas Press.
- Goddard, Ives (Ed.). (1996). Handbook of North American Indians: Languages (Vol. 17). Washington, D. C.: Smithsonian Institution. ISBN 0-16-048774-9.
- Mithun, Marianne. (1999). The languages of Native North America. Cambridge: Cambridge University Press. ISBN 0-521-23228-7 (hbk); ISBN 0-521-29875-X.
- Whorf, Benjamin L.; & Trager, George L. (1937). The relationship of Uto-Aztecan and Tanoan. American Anthropologist, 39, 609–624.
