= Huancavilca language =

Extinct unclassified language

Huancavilca
- Wankawilka, Huacavelica, Huancahuilca
- Native to: Ecuador
- Region: Guayas, Manabí, Santa Elena
- Ethnicity: Manteño-Huancavilca culture
- Extinct: (date missing)
- Language family: unclassified

Language codes
- ISO 639-3: None (mis)
- Glottolog: None
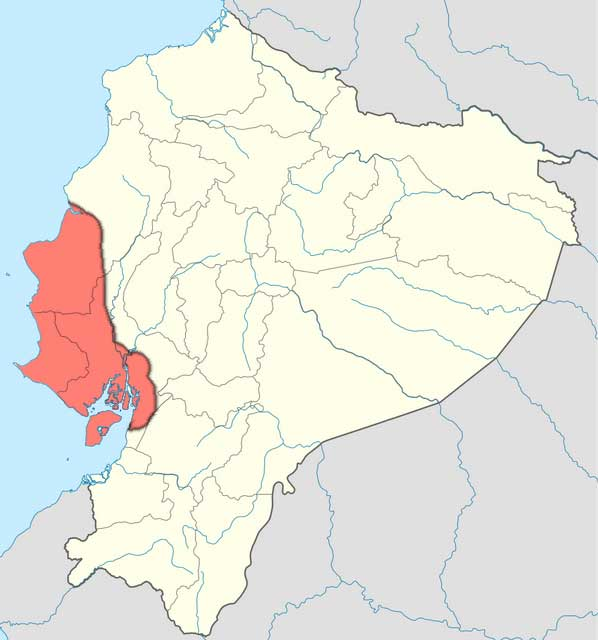

Huancavilca (Wankawilka, Huacavelica, Huancahuilca) is an extinct unclassified language formerly spoken by the Huancavilca people in Guayas, Manabí and Santa Elena Provinces in Ecuador.

== Classification ==
Mason (1950) lists Apichiquí, Cancebí, Charapoto, Pichote, Pichoasac, Pichunsi, Manabí, Jarahusa, and Jipijapa as dialects of Atalán. Rivet (1924) lists Manta, Huancavilca, Puna, and Tumbez within an Atalán family.

== Vocabulary ==
Huancavilca is very poorly known and therefore unclassifiable. Čestmír Loukotka (1968) reported that four words had been compiled in Jacinto Jijón y Caamaño's 1919 book.
