= Shiriana language =

Shiriana language may refer to:

- Ninam language
- Yanomamö language
- Sanöma language
- Bahuana language
