= Awishira language =

Awishira, Awishiri, Abishira, or Aushiri, an exonym used by the Sapara people, one of the Indigenous peoples of Ecuador, used to refer to other Indigenous peoples in the region, may refer to the following languages:

- Aewa language
- Wao Terero
- Aushiri dialect
