= Naolan language =

Extinct language of Mexico

Naolan
- Native to: Mexico
- Region: near Tula, Tamaulipas
- Ethnicity: ?Pison
- Extinct: c. 1950
- Language family: unclassified

Language codes
- ISO 639-3: None (mis)
- Glottolog: naol1234
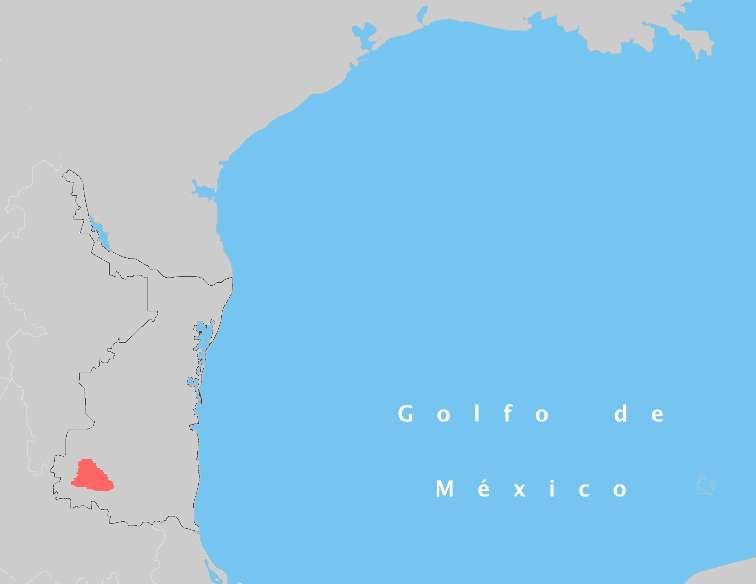
- The location of Naolan in Tamaulipas state

Naolan is an extinct language that was spoken a five-hour walk away from Tula, Tamaulipas in northeast Mexico. It is only known from 48 words and several phrases collected in the 1940s, and was nearly extinct at that time. Naolan is believed to be the language of the Pison tribe local to the area.

== Classification ==
Naolán has been compared to numerous languages, but none are obviously close and there is not enough data to spot more distant relationships. Six of the words are Spanish loans, five more appear to be loans from neighboring languages, and another four are suspected loans, leaving little to work with. Campbell (1979, 1997) therefore considers it unclassified.

== Vocabulary ==
Weitlaner's (1948) word list of Naolan is reproduced below. The words had been collected from multiple informants, who were Román Rochas, Procopio Medrano Silva, Febronio Saenz, María Hernández, and Mariano Saenz.

Spanish gloss (original)	English gloss (translated)	Naolán
mi ojo	my eye	mi yuːhu; ma yoho
mi oreja	my ear	mi koːl; ma koːl
mis 2 orejas	my 2 ears	mi maːkwil; ma kwil
muchacho	boy	maː mušilači; mačičilače
maíz	maize	masúːná
tortilla	tortilla	ma wiːši; ma wiši
calabaza de la tierra	ground squash	má sá mò'ːná
calabaza de castilla	Cucurbita argyrosperma	ma só ná; ma sóna
maguey	maguey	ma namuléa; mamuléa
quiote	quiote (agave stalk)	ma kaːso
água miel	honey	ma špaːkeː; maškape
água	water	mi; míː
carne (de venado)	meat (of deer)	ma naːme; manáme
león	lion, puma	maː čitun makapal
coyote	coyote	ma boːkam; ma boːkan
zorra	fox	má'ː-yo
venado	deer	ma naːmeːl; el amel
conejo	rabbit	ma kuyóam; makuyón; makuyo
está una víbora chillando	a rattling snake	gwašnan masiːlam
lagartija	lizard	ma naː šiːl; manači; manaketal; malačil
araña	spider	granya
caballo	horse	ma kayo
borrega	sheep (female)	magalena
borrego	sheep (male)	ma kaleːna; makanel
balido de la borrega	bleet of sheep	sána ƀa wiči
cochino	pig	moːlan, moːlam; móːlan
gallo	rooster	ma kalayo; makalayo
gallina	hen	ma kaːšta; makašte; makasta
rata	rat	ma soːče; ma sóče
panal	honeycomb	ma tuːpil; tuːpil
panal huaricho	type of honeycomb	ma pajam
panal de huariche	type of honeycomb	ma paján

== Phrases ==
Naolan phrases from Weitlaner (1948):

Spanish gloss (original)	English gloss (translated)	Naolán
Dame un cigarro.	Give me a cigarette.	sata čumaːƀal; saka čumál
Dame una tortilla.	Give me a tortilla.	tatačú mawiːši
Dame água.	Give me water.	tataču miː; tataču míː
Sabes chupar?	Do you know how to suck?	jotas noːkwil; jota nóːkil
Sí, sé chupar.	Yes, I know how to suck.	aːjájas noːkwil
Sí.	Yes.	aːj'a
Qué bonita mujer!	What a beautiful woman!	kwajano kane makwanso
Buenos días.	Hello, greetings	nyó'ːke; noike; jomene puteis; jonene puteis
Gracias, estoy bien.	Thanks, I am good.	jotuní wáːna
(mañana ?)	(tomorrow?)	aja ču (šu) wana
Cómo está tu hermana?	How is your sister?	jome tu nigwána
Qué pasa?	How is it going?	čopajo; čupájo
Mañana me voy allá al picacho.	Tomorrow I will go there to the peak.	kosúsameːuwampa ƀiːtóːya
?	?	kačumái
