= Esselen language =

Extinct Native American language of California

Esselen
- Huelel
- Native to: United States
- Region: Big Sur (California)
- Ethnicity: Esselen
- Extinct: 19th century
- Revival: 1990s
- Language family: Hokan?: Esselen
- Dialects: Western; Eastern

Language codes
- ISO 639-3: esq
- Glottolog: esse1238
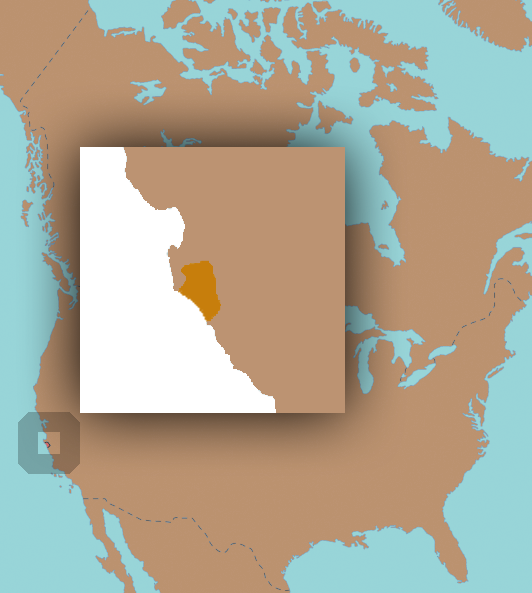

Esselen is the now-extinct language of the Esselen (or self-designated Huelel) Nation, which aboriginally occupied the mountainous Central Coast of California, immediately south of Monterey (Shaul 1995). It was probably a language isolate, though has been included as a part of the hypothetical Hokan proposal.

== Names ==
The name Esselen was derived from a village name. The Esselen people referred to their own language as Huelel. The name was recorded by Felipe Arroyo de la Cuesta on May 18, 1832, at Soledad Mission from his informant Eusebio (native name Sutasis) (cf. villel 'tongue' as recorded by Dionisio Alcalá Galiano) (Shaul 1995).

== Historical background ==
French explorer Lapérouse, who visited Monterey in 1786, reported:

The country of the Ecclemachs [Esselen] extends above 20 leagues to the [south]eastward of Monterey. Their language is totally different from all those of their neighbors, and has even more resemblance to the languages of Europe than to those of the Americas. This grammatical phenomenon, the most curious in this respect ever observed on the continent, will, perhaps, be interesting to those of the learned, who seek, in the analogy of languages, the history and genealogy of transplanted nations.

Esselen may have been the first Californian language to become extinct. Although it was spoken by many of the early converts at Mission Carmel, its use rapidly declined during the Hispanic period. Very little information on the vocabulary and grammar of Esselen was preserved. About 350 words and phrases and a few complete sentences have been preserved in literature, including a short bilingual catechism (for a summary see Mithun 1999:411–413 and Golla 2011:114). By the beginning of the 20th century the only data on Esselen that investigators such as Kroeber and Harrington could collect were a few words remembered by speakers of other Indian languages in the area.

== Classification ==
H. W. Henshaw thought that Esselen represented a monotypic linguistic family. Others, such as Shaul (2019), have assigned the language to the proposed Hokan family.

Shaul (2019) also notes that Esselen has had extensive contact with the Chumashan languages, with Esselen and Chumashan sharing many common lexical items.

== Dialects ==
The Esselen language consisted of the Western and Eastern dialects. Documentation of Western Esselen was based on data collected at Mission Carmel. It was spoken by the Excelen local tribe, and likely also the Ecgeajan local tribes to the south along the Big Sur coast, although the Ecgeajan subdialect is unattested. Eastern Esselen was documented by Arroyo, and was based on data collected at Mission Soledad, which hosted Arroyo Seco local tribes. Eastern Esselen was spoken by the Eslenajan local tribe, and probably also by the Aspasniajan and Imunajan local tribes.

The Esselen language was spoken by five local tribes. Each of the five local tribes spoke a separate subdialect.

- Esselen
  - Western
    - Excelen: upper Carmel Valley
    - Ecgeajan: along the Big Sur coast
  - Eastern
    - Imunajan: along the Arroyo Seco, just south of Mission Soledad
    - Eslenajan (or Eslen): north of Mission Soledad
    - Aspasniajan: just south of the present day town of Greenfield

The Santa Lucia Mountains formed the heart of the Esselen homeland.

Each Esselen district consisted of a local tribe with their own patrilineal clans. Members of the clans were exogamous, marrying members of other clans but within the local tribe.

Local Esselen tribes and their demographics are surveyed in Milliken (1990: 59).

Breschini and Haversat (1994: 82–88) give the following numbers of villages and population estimates for each of the five Esselen tribes. Population estimates are calculated by multiplying the number of villages by either 30 or 40 (i.e., the presumed number of individuals per village).

District	Villages	Population (with 30 persons per village)	Population (with 40 persons per village)
Excelen	4	120	160
Eslen/Eslenajan	7	210	280
Aspaniajan	2	60	80
Imunajan	5	150	200
Ecgeajan	6	180	240
Totals	24	600	960

=== Phonological and lexical differences ===
Sound correspondences between the Western and Eastern dialects:

Sound correspondences in Esselen dialects
Western	Eastern
č ~ ts	ṭ
e	a
š	s

Examples of Western č ~ ts : Eastern ṭ
Gloss	Western	Eastern
man	exe-noč	exe-noṭ
father	aya ~ a'ay	m-a'aṭ
earth	matsa	maṭa
we	leč	leṭ
you (pl.)	*nomeč	nomeṭ
they	lač	laṭ
it is finished	*amomuč	amo-muṭ
completive	-mutsu ~ -musu	-muṭ

Examples of Western e : Eastern a
Gloss	Western	Eastern
you (sg.)	ném:e	name
your (sg.)	nemi-š-	nami-s-
you (pl.)	neme-x	nome-

Examples of Western š : Eastern s
Gloss	Western	Eastern
my daughter	ni-š-ta	ni-s-ta
sun	aši	asi
cottontail rabbit	čiši	čis
girl	šoleta	soleta-sis
agentive marker	-piši	-pisi

Lexical differences between the Western and Eastern dialects:

Lexical variation in Esselen dialects
Gloss	Western	Eastern
head	kxata-sax	xis:i
eyes	hikpa	ka
mouth	iši ~ iš:e	katus-nex
heart	tika-s	maša-nex
river	sana-x	asum
that one	hainihi	huiniki
I	eni	ne

== Phonology ==
Consonants
	Labial	Alveolar	Retroflex	Palatal	Velar	Glottal
Plosive	p	t	ʈ		k	ʔ
Affricate		ts			kx	
Fricative		s		ʃ	x	h
Nasal	m	n				
Rhotic		r				
Approximant	w	l		j		

/p/ has allophones of [f] and [pf]. /t/ has an allophone of [tʃ].

Vowels
	Front	Back
Close	i	u
Close-mid	e	o
Open	a	

== Pronouns ==
Subject pronouns in Western Esselen (Shaul 2019: 89):

	sg	pl
1	ene ~ eni	leč-s; lex
2	nemi ~ nimi	nemič; nemux
3	lal	lač; lax

Subject pronouns in Eastern Esselen (Shaul 2019: 89):

	sg	pl
1	ene ~ ne	leṭ; lex
2	name	nomeṭ; nomux
3	huiniki	laṭ; lax

== Syntax ==
Word order is primarily SOV (Shaul 2019).

== Lexicon ==
Shaul (1995) reconstitutes Esselen vocabulary, synthesized from various historical sources, as follows. Forms from Alfred L. Kroeber are marked by (Kr).

gloss	Esselen
adult	-nVč
all	komVnam
arrow	lóto-s
bear	koltála
bow	paxu-nax
child/son	pana
cry	siawa
dance	mepV, mef-
dark	tumas (Kr)
day	asátsa
die	moho
dog	šošo
drink	etse, eše
ear	tus-usp (Kr)
earth	maṭa, matsa
eyes	-ikxpa
father	haya
female	ta-
foot	kxéle
friend	-efe
girl	soléta
give	toxésa
good/well	sale-
grandfather	meči
ground squirrel	mexe
hair	haka
head	kxáta-sVx
large	putú-ki; yakí-s-ki
man	exe-
mother	atsia
mountain	polomo
mountain lion	xeke-s
mouth	iši
nails	uluxV
night	tomani-s
nose	xoši
person	efexe
pinole	amúxe
plain	yala-x
quail	kumul (Kr)
rabbit (cottontail)	čiši, čis-
salmon	kilí-
seal	opopa-pas
sky	imi-
small	ukxu-s-ki
speak	al-pa
sun	aši
teeth	awur
water	asa-nax
where	kéya-
who	kíni
wildcat	toloma
wood	i'i
yes	íke

=== Numbers ===
gloss	Esselen
one	pek
two	kxulax
three	kxulep
four	kxamakxu-s
five	pemakxa-la
six	pek-walanai
seven	kxula-walanai
eight	kxulef-walanai
ten	tomóila

== Bibliography ==
- Golla, Victor. 2011. California Indian Languages. University of California Press.
- Mithun, Marianne. 1999. The Languages of Native North America. Cambridge University Press.
- Shaul, David Leedom (1995). "The Huelel (Esselen) Language". International Journal of American Linguistics. 61 (2): 191–239. ISSN 0020-7071.
