= Oti language =

Extinct language isolate of Brazil

Otí
- Chavante, Xavante
- Otí
- Native to: Brazil
- Region: State of São Paulo, Paranapanema River basin
- Ethnicity: Otí
- Extinct: early 20th century
- Language family: Language isolate

Language codes
- ISO 639-3: oti
- Glottolog: otii1244
- Linguasphere: 89-KAA-aa
- Map of the Otí language

The Otí language, also known as Chavante or Euchavante, is a language isolate or an unclassified language once spoken in the state of São Paulo, Brazil, between the Peixe and Pardo rivers. The language became extinct at the beginning of the 20th century. Only a few wordlists are preserved, totaling 110 words.

== Classification ==
Oti is left unclassified by Lyle Campbell due to a paucity of information. Greenberg classified Oti as a Macro-Jê language, but he provided almost no supporting data and has not been followed by other researchers. Glottolog classifies it as a language isolate.

== History ==
The Oti were largely exterminated in the late 19th century out of fear that they were Kaingang. Nimuendajú estimated that there were some 50 Oti in 1890. By 1903, there were only 8, divided between two locations, one a few kilometers east of Indiana and east of Presidente Prudente, between the Peixe and Paranapanema rivers, and one in Platina, some 50 km northwest of Ourinhos. The traditional Oti lands up to 1870 had been located between these two places. In 1910, three Oti people remained. In 1988, the last Oti died.

== Vocabulary ==
Only 110 words of Otí were preserved, in a total of three wordlists.

The following collective wordlist of Otí is taken from Quadros (1892), Borba (1908: 73–76), and Nimuendajú in Ihering (1912: 8).

Quadros	Borba	Nimuendajú	gloss
inuáde			man
donduéde	hipipá		woman
	teuéde		young man
	uictoma		young woman
ascábe	athrabe	káibĕ, athkabe	father
idúa	fiduá	kaié	mother
váca		koaká, daká	brother
forte			sister
		a'äi	older sister
		kakí	younger sister
		ko'ajé	grandmother
		ko'á	grandfather
equéri	cuejê		old
estouduéde	itarduêde		boy
culi			"bush Indian"
ufúbi	ursube		head
eteche		naôdj	hair
cúa		tuála	forehead
	acli, athli		eye
inóne			eyebrow
acófi	aconxe	kō's(h)a	ear
sonduái	assondlaibe		nose
afot			mouth
vê		ûa	teeth
instúa			breast
aquejuè	esteinde		arm
iquéce		étjĕ	finger
etiu	eltuê	akjô'	stomach
fube			buttocks
	atua		neck
	jube	fum	foot
etáge	eteque	taz(h)	leg
euîque			knee
astaete			blood
quatá	cuatá		jaguar
apíla	apila	apíla 'female tapir'	tapir
		biétj	male tapir
inchéla			white-lipped peccary
quicua	antla, inthla, tócle, tothle		collared peccary
jagóde	jagode	z(h)agodj, digóde 'female deer'	deer
eféga			armadillo
foguedái		fugidó, fogodó	partridge
palaiáo	apalaiao	iská, is(h)ká	snake
	uida		macaw
	ontirra		howler monkey
	othigue (Note: ⟨th⟩ is pronounced as in English)		capybara
	guiacú		guan
	uarriga		jabuticaba
	nectube		otter
	cái		monkey
	tú		solitary tinamou
	ilobi		mosquito
	erredebe		fish
	guatá	gna'atá	parrot
	etecubetei		coati
	alábe		tamandua
	flongue		toucan
	dejuáca, tofoaca		spot-winged wood quail
		aiêdĕ	dog
		gáio	cattle
		z(h)indé, gla'dō'	bird
	chantle		corn
		z(h)êbj, es(h)êbĕ	rice
		istêbj	bamboo
	nhadalee		to kill
	inháre		to beat
	mendoa		to bake/roast
	uirgėlem		to fight
	icabe		to eat
	tanyenne		to run
	roiábe		sit down
	heumôde		come
	escoguilabe		get up
	bóje		throw out
	birrua		hole
	o'gode		wax
concéde		kõsidé	honey
	tajane		bread
	igobe	gobj	house
	déxe		pot, pan
	inhestecude		bow
	torta		arrow
	endáe		axe
	chanin	béia	rain
	uotue		day
	oteiaque		night
atáve			sky
esquentable	esquentábe	iskentál	sun
guiáde	quyade		moon
tuásia	tuasla		star
catiága			thunder
jatúme			ray
achô		úgide	fire
ocochìa		kos(h)îa	water
folháhe	juartle		field
	diguede		forest
	rátcha		stone
	dielsede	diésĕ	river
	birõa		earth
	leilebe		very
	umostiara		long
	nojede		red
	jaque (Note: ⟨j⟩ is pronounced as in Spanish)		white
	hon		black
	pequinhe		1
	istonra		2
	ojeleidapá		3
		otí	Chavante
		podeuêdĕ	Kaingua
		sī'sua	Brazilian

These wordlists are also reproduced in Ihering (1903).
