= Mato Grosso Arára language =

Extinct unclassified language of Brazil

Arára
- Yugapkatã, Koaiá, Koayá
- Native to: Brazil
- Region: Aripuanã, Mato Grosso
- Ethnicity: 249 Araras of Aripuanã (2014)
- Extinct: 20th century 2 remembers (2008)
- Language family: unclassified

Language codes
- ISO 639-3: axg
- Glottolog: mato1253
- ELP: Arára of Mato Grosso

Mato Grosso Arára (also disambiguated as Arara do Beiradão or Arara do Rio Branco, and also known as Koaiá ~ Koayá or Yugapkatã) is an extinct unclassified language of Brazil. The ethnic population that spoke the language numbers 249 as of 2014.

== Classification ==
The language is unclassified, with no known connections to established families. It is attested in a few word lists, which shows it is neither Tupian nor Arawakan. Four people remembered the language in 2001, and two in 2008, but none were fluent speakers.

Jolkesky (2010) notes some lexical similarities with Tupian.

== Vocabulary ==
The following vocabulary list was collected in 2001 by Inês Hargreaves from two Arara groups in the north of the Parque Aripuanã, Rondônia. The informants were João Luis V. Arara, José Rodrigues V. Arara, Maria Aruy Arara, and Ana Anita Arara.

Arara do Rio Branco word list
Arara do Rio Branco	English
mbaja	child
no pai	claw
kubai wit	to drink
no beʃia	ear
no ka pĩn	eye
areka	fire
no pia	foot
nukij	good
mbap	hair
kopap	head
nduka	louse
be ʃa	mouth
no jan	nose
wjaʔ	stone
noĩn	tooth
adɛ	water

For a more extensive vocabulary list of Arara by Jolkesky (2010), see the corresponding Portuguese article.
