= Esmeralda–Yaruroan languages =

Proposed language family of Venezuela

Esmeralda–Yaruro
- (proposed)
- Geographic distribution: Venezuela, Ecuador
- Linguistic classification: Proposed language family
- Subdivisions: Esmeralda †; Pumé

Language codes
- Glottolog: None

Esmeralda–Yaruro or Takame–Jarúroan is a proposed connection between two unclassified languages or language isolates of Venezuela and Ecuador respectively: Pumé (Llaruro, Yaruro, Yuapín), with 6,000 speakers, and the extinct Esmeralda (Esmeraldeño, Takame). The proposal was first advanced in 1902. They would be only distantly related, but Kaufman (1990) finds the connection convincing, and Campbell (2012) believes the connection is promising.

== Vocabulary ==
Below is a comparison of selected basic vocabulary items in Esmeralda and Pumé.

gloss	Esmeralda	Pumé
hair	rarapo	kü̃́
eye	mula	dachó
nose	ra-ausa (my)	ĩbupuȩ́
tooth	ra-ha, ra-ka	jõdȩ́
mouth	bassa	dyá
hand	disa (my)	ichí
foot	taha	tá
blood	kar(k)a	gué
bone	mu-kilsa	jú
person	ilon	o̧ãĩ́
name	chinto	kẽ́
dog	kine	(a)oré
fish	ki	chṍ
tree	tá(k)te	tó
leaf	rampide (?)	to pjü̃dá
water	uivi, úvoi	uí
fire	muka (with)	kjõdȩ́
earth	dó; dula	dabú
road	dire	nṍ
eat	enima	jurá
die	ubale, ybale 'dead'	jãbó
