= Macro-Siouan languages =

Proposed language family of North America

Macro-Siouan
- (controversial)
- Geographic distribution: eastern North America
- Linguistic classification: Proposed language family
- Subdivisions: Siouan; Yuchi; Caddoan; Iroquoian

Language codes
- Glottolog: None
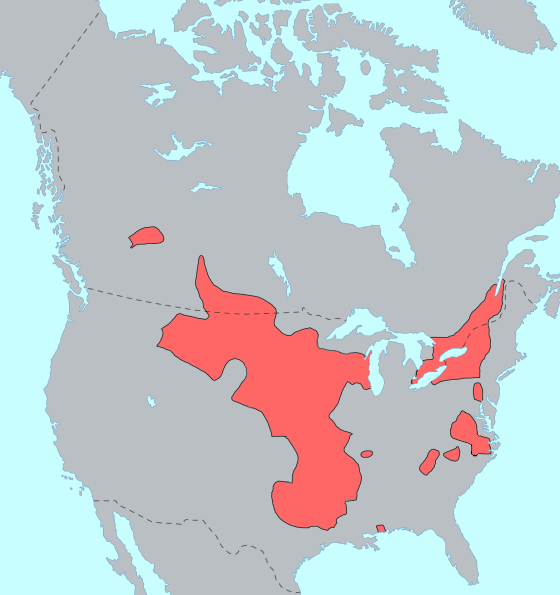
- Pre-contact distribution of the proposed Macro-Siouan language family

The Macro-Siouan languages are a proposed language family that includes the Siouan-Catawban, Iroquoian, and Caddoan families. Most linguists remain unconvinced that these languages share a genetic relationship, and the existence of a Macro-Siouan language family remains a subject of debate.

In the 19th century, Robert Latham suggested that the Siouan-Catawban languages are related to the Caddoan and Iroquoian languages. In 1931, Louis Allen presented the first list of systematic correspondences between a set of 25 lexical items in Siouan-Catawban and Iroquoian. In the 1960s and 1970s, Wallace Chafe further explored the link between Siouan-Catawban and Caddoan languages. In the 1990s, Marianne Mithun compared the morphology and syntax of all the three families. At present, the Macro-Siouan hypothesis based on relations among Siouan-Catawban, Caddoan, and Iroquoian is not universally accepted as proven.

== Vocabulary ==
Below is a comparison of selected basic vocabulary items in Proto-Siouan-Catawban, Proto-Iroquoian, and Pawnee (a Caddoan language).

Abbreviations

- N = Proto-Northern Iroquoian

gloss	Proto-Siouan	Proto-Iroquoian	Pawnee
head	*rą-išú·	*-hskʷ-	páksuʔ
hair	*rą·tų́	*-kiɁɹh-	úːsuʔ
eye	*ištá	N *-kahɹ-	kiríːkuʔ
ear	*rą́·tpa; *rąxu·-	N *-(a)hõht-	
nose	*hpa-sú·	*-Ɂnjõːhs-	icúːsuʔ
tooth	*i-hí·; *í·h-Sa (?)	N *-noɁts-, *-noɁtsj-	áːruʔ
tongue	*i-ré·ši		háːtuʔ
mouth	*ʔí·he		háːkauʔ
hand	*rąpé > *i-rąpe; *ų́·ke (?)	*-oɁnj-	íksuʔ
foot	*i-sí	*-aːhs-, *-aːhsiɁt-	ásuʔ
breast	*á·si	*-nõɁt-	éːtuʔ
meat	*i-yó·		kísacki
blood	*(wa-)ʔí·(-re)	N *-nkõ-, *-nkʷẽhs-	páːtuʔ
bone	*wa-hú·(-re)	N *-Ɂnẽj-; *-hskẽɁɹ-	kíːsuʔ
person	*wą́·ke	N *-õkʷeh, *-õkʷehsɹ-, *-õkʷeɁt- (v.)	cáhriks
name	*yá·še	N *-hsẽn-	
dog	*wašų́ke, *wi-šų́·ke	*kiːɹ	ásaːki
fish	*wi-hó·	*-tsjõɁt-	kacíːki
louse	*(w-)hé· < **(wa-)hé·		
tree		N *kaɹhit, *keɹhit, *keɹhiɁ, *kɹaheːt, *kɹahit	rahaːpe
leaf	*á·pe	N *-nɹaht-	kuːtik
flower	*xyá; *xyéhe	N *-ẽh- (Iroquoia)	
water	*yo; *wa-rį́·	*awẽɁ	kíːcuʔ
fire	*(wa-)hpé·te	*-tsiːɹ	keːkauʔ ‘flame’
stone	*(wa-)ʔį́·(-re); *rį́·sV; *į́-xʔe	*-nẽːj-	karítki
earth	*awą́·-	N *-õhwẽtsj-	huráːruʔ
salt		N *-tsikheɁt-	
road	*yą́·ku	N *-ah-, *-(a)hah-	hatúːruʔ
eat	*rú·tE	*-k-	waːwa-a
die	*tʔé·(-re)	N *-ihej-	hurahac
I	*w-	*hskʷi (2:1.SG)	-t-
you	*yi·- ~ *yį·-	*kõː (1:2.SG); N *iːts	-s-

== Bibliography ==
- Campbell, Lyle (1997). American Indian Languages: The Historical Linguistics of Native America. Oxford: Oxford University Press.
