= Ramanos language =

Extinct language of Bolivia

Ramanos
- Native to: Bolivia
- Region: Moxos Province
- Era: attested ca. 1790
- Language family: Language isolate

Language codes
- ISO 639-3: None (mis)
- Glottolog: rama1271

Ramanos is a poorly attested extinct language of what is now Bolivia. Glottolog concludes that "the minuscule wordlist ... shows no convincing resemblances to surrounding languages".

== Vocabulary ==
Ramanos word list from the late 1700s published in Palau and Saiz (1989):

Spanish gloss	English gloss	Ramanos
bueno	good	esumatá
malo	bad	emayio
el padre	father	tatá
la madre	mother	naná
el hermano	brother	nochoine
uno	one	eapurava
dos	two	casevava
tres	three	quimisa
