= Gamela language =

Extinct indigenous language of Brazil

Gamela
- Gamela of Viana
- Native to: Maranhão, Brazil
- Region: Northeastern Brazil
- Ethnicity: ~1,200 Gamela people
- Extinct: by 1930
- Language family: unclassified (isolate?)

Language codes
- ISO 639-3: None (mis)
- Glottolog: game1240

Gamela (Gamella), a.k.a. Curinsi or Acobû, is an unclassified and extinct language of the municipality of Viana in the state of Maranhão of Northeastern Brazil. It was originally spoken along the Itapecuru River, Turiaçu River, and Pindaré River, with ethnic descendants reported to be living in Cabo and Vianna in Maranhão State. The Gamela today speak Xavante and Portuguese. The last full-blooded Gamela died around the 1910s, and by 1930 only one old woman still remembered something of the language. 19 words of the language are recorded in Nimuendajú (1937:68).

Kaufman (1994) said that 'only Greenberg dares to classify this language', due to the lack of data on it.

== Other varieties ==
Nimuendajú also mentioned the Guaná, Uruaty, Cahicahy, Guaxioná, Aranhi, Suassuhy, Arayó, Anapurú, Guanaré, Coroatá, Barbado and Gamella as existing in Maranhão in the 17th and 18th centuries.

== Vocabulary ==
Gamella words recorded by Nimuendajú (1937:68) from his informant Maria Cafuza in Viana, Maranhão:

gloss	Gamella
fire	tatá (< Tupi)
penis	purú
vulva	sebú
Negro	katú-brohó
White? Indian?	katú-koyaká
brother-in-law	múisi
pot	kokeáto
gourd bowl	kutubé
club	tamarána (< Tupi)
knife	kasapó
jaguar	yopopó
monkey	kokói (< Timbira)
horse	pohoné
cattle	azutí
domestic fowl	kureːká
tree	kyoipé
tobacco	anéno
pepper	birizu
thick	tomabéto

A single proper name survives of the language of the Gamela people of Codó: Bertrotopama, the name of their last chief.

== Bibliography ==
- Kaufman, Terrence (1994). "The native languages of South America". In Mosley, C.; Asher, R. E. (eds.). Atlas of the world's languages. London: Routledge. pp. 46–76.
