= Guamo language =

Extinct language of Venezuela

Guamo
- Guamontey
- Native to: southern Venezuela
- Region: Apure, Barinas, Guárico, and Portuguesa
- Extinct: after 1778
- Language family: Guamo–Chapakuran?: Guamo

Language codes
- ISO 639-3: None (mis)
- Glottolog: guam1236
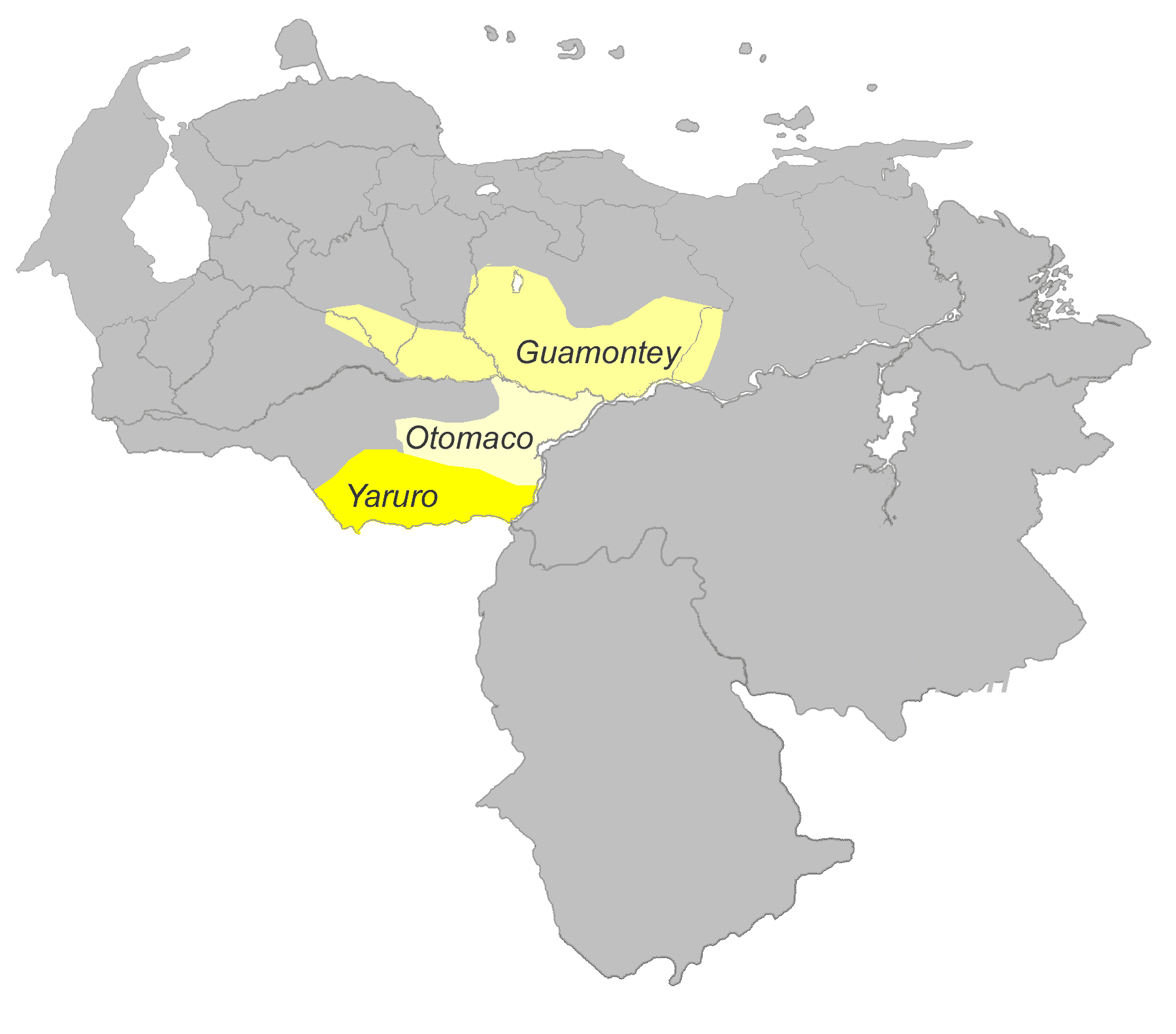
- Guamontey

Guamo (a.k.a. Wamo or Guamotey) is an extinct language of Venezuela. Kaufman (1990) finds a connection with the Chapacuran languages convincing.

== 1778 word list ==
Guama is primarily attested in a word list from 1778. The list has been reproduced below, with the original Spanish orthography maintained for the Guama forms.

Spanish gloss (original)	English gloss (translated)	Guama (original orthography)
Dios	God	Aipit matá
padre	father	jauai
madre	mother	famú, jamo
hijo	son	clujuapi, tufé
hija	daughter	tuapi, tua
hermano	brother	dipiâ, dipe
hermana	sister	tipi, dipe
marido	husband	diquimi
mujer	woman	diquime, ticauca
doncella	young woman	ascu murestapane
mozo	young man	daicoraquâ, guaté
niño	child	chufi, choafi
hombre	man	daiju, dauirco
gente	people	aucherme, caserme
cabeza	head	putí, puté
cara	face	cutí, taquajo fin
nariz	nose	fin
narices	noses	auji fin
ojo	eye	tujua, tuaguin
cejas	eyebrows	chafuti, ascaro tuagun
pestañas	eyelashes	matatújua, dicho
oreja	ear	dupen
frente	forehead	tintecuti, titicunté
cabellos	hair	scará, ascaro
mejillas	cheeks	faquibtari
boca	mouth	matá
garganta	throat	pichê, dischufa
labios	lips	dufpâ, matá
dientes	teeth	aufê, ufé
lengua	tongue	dituâ
barba	beard	dischemata, dichimatá
cuello	neck	dischufa
hombro	shoulder	matachêa, ochepe
codo	elbow	dupeju, dicho
mano	hand	catâne
brazo	arm	chê, ochepe
dedos	fingers	diji, dujum
uñas	fingernails	casquiri, cascurum
pecho	chest	cupa
vientre	belly	dueju, cataju
espalda	back	matatiputi, gi
pie	foot	catafa
rodilla	knee	aquapec
corazón	heart	afquinantafa, tife
estómago	stomach	catafu
sangre	blood	jue, ducú
leche	milk	temontepaca, terau
piel	skin	dacaju, cauté
carne	meat	testu
hueso	bone	ditancu
oído	ear	quiepen, dupen
vista	sight	jateique, paiquac
ver	see	jasii, dicho
gusto	taste (sense of)	muquati, guacatá
olfato	smell (sense of)	suquagtiri, astiri
oler	smell (verb)	astiri, dicho
tacto	touch	shape
voz	voice	cadse, chefé
hablar	speak	texê
palabra	word	cuscaisi, mitejé
nombrar	to name	suquampeiste
gritar	shout	ducare, guacare
grito	scream	guacare
ruido	noise	esquiêjua, esquianju
aullido	howl	aitê, aucatacut
llorar	cry	ducatit, aitê
reír	laugh	michista, mutista
cantar	sing	chejê, tefé
estornudar	sneeze	sam, fam
temblar	tremble	najasta
suspirar	sigh	squanarcadjo
bostezar	yawn	chuataqua, suataco
silbar	whistle	tucquê, fue
echarse	lie (down)	asconjua
para (tú)	stop, stand (you)	fitinfin
ir	go	quantia, jera
ve (tú)	go (you)	jate
vete	go away	jeraui
dormir	sleep	cutum, ascutin
sueño	dream	cadpe, dicho
saltar	jump	scotara, auscharar
tener	have, possess	quimina, chape ascaya
correr	run	eirura, airura
bailar	to dance	charâ, chife catafá
mamar	suck	mon, ture nume
amor	love	muquali, pulgui pasca
tristeza	sadness	jarcadjo, quiapen sarui
dolor	pain	parqui, parguin
trabajo	work	turicha, fari
perezoso	lazy	sariqui, farui figuian
yo	I	napi, ascaté
tu	you (sg.)	najâ, ascai
aquel	that, it	dichêra, fillaji
nosotros	we	napüe, ascá causerme
vosotros	you (pl.)	napu
aquellos	those	dicatiarque
yo soy	I am	scate, napijaí
tú eres	you (sg.) are	jillague ystacut
él es	he is	nani, tiquiante
nosotros somos	we are	scate, napilla
vosotros sois	you (pl.) are	jiguian caser
aquellos son	those are	napáre yerque
fue	it was	daqua, dan
comer	eat	eiquia, tuan
yo como	I eat	eiquiari, diquia
tú comes	you eat	puiquiare, diguiacta
aquel come	it eats	sieradaturi
beber	drink	mirco, dicú
tomar	take, eat	llaju chape
sacudir (golpear)	shake, hit	pacta, aspantaca
llover	to rain	coioradauscha, dauscha
echar	throw	jareram, pataca
desgarrar	tear	escarsi, damafin miti
da (tú)	give (you)	da ticú
cortar	cut	cotia
ocultar	to hide	tetena, titascú
fuerza	strength	quiestaquiqui, cuvi
parir	give birth	chersta, ascheracta
familia	family	aucharme, aujui
matrimonio	marriage	spanso, dispansu
viuda	widow	arecu, ujiruri
vivir	live	jurin
vida	life	ascujirura
estatura	height	pumafi
alma	soul	catapiu
morir	die	tugri, jurirá
muerte	death	jurirá
viejo	old	vise, daurisi
joven	young	chusi, augua
dar	give	dá
grande	big	daijó
pequeño	small	guasta
alto	high	ascotin, pumafi
bajo	low	quiesascon, chijumata
frio	cold	tauchista
caliente	hot	cayua
sano	healthy	pulgui
bueno	good	purqui
malvado	evil	chafafiguia
capaz	able	murestafiguian
agudo	sharp	gomata
redondo	round	cheta
ligero	light (of weight)	aunquitera
pesado	heavy	quiestaman, maquiestaquê, cuerá
fuerte	strong	parguin
delgado	thin	quiestaquasta, gastaui
grueso	thick	quiestapi, aspije
ancho	width	piegta
presto	fast	squatira, ascate ará
blanco	white	cajirian, custára
negro	black	disiacú, disau
encarnado	red (deep)	aisio, daisui
verde	green	aufui, cupe
azul	blue	daupe
sol	sun	tign, matatin
luna	moon	pactes
estrella	star	tac
cielo	sky	tign, ducunti
niebla	fog	suapicia, faralla
nube	cloud	dauscha, sauxe dacuchanan
arco iris	rainbow	cascóron
rayo	lightning	paruaraucha
aire	air	tacsco
viento	wind	tascú, dicho
huracán	hurricane	tascú
vapor	steam, vapor	caguatansi
rocío	dew	taguetascanjua
trueno	thunder	daucha, paro adaucha
relámpago	lightning	aysi ura tigua
frio	cold	tauchista
helada	frost	dicho
hielo	ice	dicho
fuego	fire	cujue
lumbre	firelight	tia
sombra	shadow	chuanta
sombrío	shady	chontá, dicho
día	day	garu, jaro
noche	night	chona, chiuna
mañana	morning	sajaru, fajaro
tarde	afternoon	chuna
verano	summer	dacá
hibierno	winter	daucha
semana	week	misa
año	year	nujua
tiempo	time	nujua
tierra	earth	taumchê, tansie
agua	water	cum
mar	sea	duque, ricum
río	river	duque, duaguix
lago	lake	jum
olas	waves	dichotá, dischuta
islas	islands	cutiduque, matafi
arena	sand	agspi, ispú
polvo	powder	ducug, ducumtanesi
cieno	silt	farotansi
montaña	mountain	discu, piriscu
profundidad	depth	pefu
altura	height	coti
anchura	width	pix
agujero	hole	si, fitintansi
cueva	cave	sin
piedra	stone	canjiú, dacanjue
plata	silver	tugti, tiné
cobre	copper	taupé
hierro	iron	chaparari, chutatueno
estaño	tin	catarafú
plomo	lead	dicho
sal	salt	tig
cal	lime	teutate canjui
veneno	poison	discú, taxtú
yerba	grass	scanjua, ascanjue
árbol	tree	disycu, discu
leña	firewood	discuy, matariscu
palo (raíz)	stick (root)	discú, dicha cataruscu
tronco	trunk	pichericu
corteza	bark	cajuriscú
rama	branch	aspejan
hoja	leaf	estejan, tercundiscun
flor	flower	quamastastajan
fruta	fruit	jejan, chara
semilla	seed	simijan, chifitaum
cebolla	onion	dauscu, chapachin
campo	field	maq, pixmatá
sembrar	to plant, sow	tajon, taum
pescado	fish	dacuay, dupaque
cangrejo	crab	chause
serpiente	snake	chuen
rana	frog	jupi, pupi
gusano	worm	duestu, duxtú
mosca	fly (insect)	timi
mosquito	mosquito	dacoiomta, turive
hormiga	ant	tuse, dacantu
araña	spider	caipa, callaapa
abeja	bee	pane
miel	honey	pane, cuncatapane
buey	ox	guei, pacá
vaca	cow	paca, dicho
ternera	veal	tuajan, tuate paca
cuerno	horn	aucaju, guacao
caballo	horse	cama
asno	donkey	mura
cerdo	pork	puiti
perro	dog	gaurig, jaure
gato	cat	michi
león	lion	asturi dacamtue, dion
oso	bear	jarcuri
lobo	wolf	catapenx
zorra	fox	dacob, ducu
liebre	hare	catapeux
ratón	rat	sá, fá
gallina	hen	quacarpa, carpa
gallo	rooster	quacarpa, dauircucarpa
pato	duck	pes, aspejú
pichón	dove	cuipu, taguantá capú
águila	eagle	taquipe ausqueri
pájaro	bird	camquie, camuguir
golondrina	swallow	tacatirjue
pluma	feather	quiastaján
huevo	egg	tinue
nido	nest	tajú, tajuer
pastor	shepherd	acagta, axfanta paca
casa	house	danga, danxa
choza	hut	taquatan daxjá
tienda	shop	matafué
puerta	door	matafué, mataranja
ciudad	city	dino, chufae
medida	measurement	spetajan
escribir	write	chuanejo, dichuane catani
cuchillo	knife	choy, chu
mesa	table	mesa
banco	bank	scanajuc, chiscú
navío	ship	cao
vestido	dress (clothing)	spaqui
media	socks	scanaquisi, ascanoguafi
zapato	shoe	chicatasi, ascanomatafi
gorro	hat	ascanotefi
faja	belt	squiesco
seda	silk	amdari
algodón	cotton	tamdari, andare
comida	food	datuam
crudo	raw	daisio
cocer	to cook	quinejua, esquino
vino	wine	cumg catatesaqua
manteca	butter	augstari, ustari
pan	bread	pan
dinero	money	daugquin, tif
ladrón	thief	gitascu, titascu
guardia	guard	dajacasta
guerra	war	duematú
soldado	soldier	dapacaute, fundá
lanza	spear	taumtariscu, jujon
señor	sir	guei, guai
rey	king	rei
si	yes	aja, cumista
no	no	ugi, guasi
cerca	near	tista, ascocam, tistá
lejos	far	gitára, titate
aquí	here	nam
allá	there	tigua, ticoa
hoy	today	garucan
como	how	mi cugte
qué	what	micú
quien	who	virgquian
con quien	with whom	dapurasquaña
bajo	low	danjuana, pefu
número	number	quete
uno	one	tagstar, tagstame
dos	two	quete, diquiampa
tres	three	curumqutin, cacute
cuatro	four	sidasquin, fixguante
cinco	five	tamanane
mil	thousand	taugui
mañana	tomorrow	sagarû
ayer	yesterday	garusue

== Bibliography ==
- Kaufman, Terrence (1990). "Language History in South America: What we know and how to know more". In David L. Payne (ed.). Amazonian Linguistics. Austin: University of Texas Press.
