= John Alden Mason =

American archaeologist and linguist (1885–1967)

- John Alden Mason
- Born: January 14, 1885; Orland, Indiana, U.S.
- Died: November 7, 1967 (aged 82); Bryn Mawr Hospital, Bryn Mawr, Pennsylvania, U.S.
- Occupations: Linguist and anthropologist

Academic work
- Main interests: Indigenous languages of the Americas

John Alden Mason (January 14, 1885 – November 7, 1967) was an American archaeological anthropologist and linguist.

Mason was born in Orland, Indiana, but grew up in Philadelphia's Germantown. He received his undergraduate degree from the University of Pennsylvania in 1907 and a doctorate from the University of California, Berkeley in 1911. His dissertation was an ethnographic study of the Salinan Amerindian ethnic group of California. He also authored a number of linguistic studies, including a study of Piman languages. His later ethnographic works included studies of the Tepehuan.

The first series of Juan Bobo stories published in the U.S. occurred in 1921. They appeared in the Journal of American Folklore under the title Porto Rican Folklore, and were collected by Mason from Puerto Rican school children. The story collection consisted of 56 "Picaresque Tales" about Juan Bobo, and included such exotic titles as Juan Bobo Heats up his Grandmother, Juan Bobo Delivers a Letter to the Devil, Juan Bobo Throws his Brother Down a Well, and Juan Bobo refuses to Marry the Princess. Many of the stories he collected have been edited and published in a 2021 book.

In 1922, Captain Marshall Field provided funds for an archaeological survey of Colombia. Assistant Curator Mason led the expedition that lasted until August 1923. The Field Museum of Natural History houses a collection of correspondence, largely in the form of letters between Mason and the Curator of Anthropology, Berthold Laufer.

He is also well known for his comprehensive classification of the languages of South America.

Mason was curator of the University Museum at the University of Pennsylvania from 1926 until his retirement in 1958. His papers are housed at the American Philosophical Society in Philadelphia.

== See also ==
- Aurelio Macedonio Espinosa Sr.

== Sources ==
- John Alden Mason Papers at the American Philosophical Society
- Project Muse
- "Descendants of Capt. Hugh Mason in America", by Edna W. Mason, 1937
- "Who Was Who in America", Vol. 10
