= Maratino language =

Extinct North American aboriginal language

Maratino
- Tamaulipeco
- Native to: NE Mexico
- Region: near Martín, Tamaulipas
- Extinct: (date missing)
- Language family: unclassified (Uto-Aztecan?)

Language codes
- ISO 639-3: None (mis)
- Glottolog: mara1266
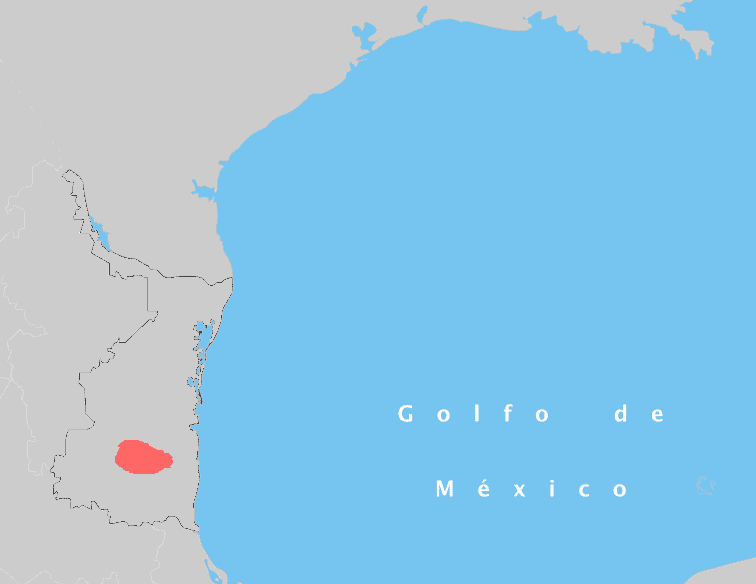
- The location of Maratino in Tamaulipas state

Maratino is a poorly attested extinct language that was spoken in north-east Mexico, near Martín, Tamaulipas. Swanton, who called it 'Tamaulipeco', classified it as Uto-Aztecan based on a few obvious cognates, such as Maratino chiguat 'woman' ~ Nahuatl cihuātl 'woman' and peyot 'peyote' ~ Nahuatl peyotl, but other scholars have not considered this to be enough to classify the language.

== Vocabulary ==
The following vocabulary list of Maratino is from John Swanton (1940: 122–124).

gloss	Maratino
able	kugtima
after the manner of	niwa
although	kuaahne
and	he
arrow	ciri
bird	magtc
bow	mahkā
but yet	kuaahne
children	tzikuini
come home, to	utepa
cord	pong
cry, to	mimigihi
deer	kons(gio)
(diminutive suffix)	-i
drink, to	baah(ka)
eat, to	migtikui
enemy	koapagtzi
escape, to	kugtima
far	kuiüsikuima
flee, to	pamini
forces	koh
forest (?)	tamu
go, to	nohgima
joy	maamehe
kill, to	paahtcu
leap, to	maatzimetzu
like	niwa
lion	xuri
little	-i
many	a-a
meat	migtikui
mountain	tamu
not	-he
now	mohka
our	ming
peyote	peyot
(plural suffix)	-a
run, to	kuino, kugtima
see, to	tepeh
shots	katama
shout, to	nohgima
shout for joy, to	maamehe
sleep, to	tutcē
strength	koh
the	tze
them	me
these	tze
to	tamu
unable	kugtimā
us	ko, ming
very	kuiüsikuima
war, to	tamu
we	ming
weep, to	mimigihi
without	-he
wolf	bum
woman	tciwat
woods	tamu
yet	kuaahne
