= Lyle Campbell =

American scholar and linguist (born 1942)

- Born: October 22, 1942 (age 83)

Academic background
- Education: Brigham Young University (BA); University of Washington (MA); University of California, Los Angeles (PhD)
- Thesis: Historical Linguistics and Quichean Linguistic Prehistory (1971)
- Doctoral advisor: William O. Bright

Academic work
- Main interests: Historical linguistics, Native American languages
- Notable works: American Indian languages: the historical linguistics of Native America (1997), Historical Linguistics: An introduction (4 editions)

Lyle Richard Campbell (born October 22, 1942) is an American scholar and linguist known for his studies of indigenous American languages, especially those of Central America, and on historical linguistics in general. Campbell is professor emeritus of linguistics at the University of Hawaiʻi at Mānoa.

== Life and career ==
Campbell was born on October 22, 1942, and grew up in rural Oregon. He received a B.A. in archaeology and anthropology from Brigham Young University in 1966, then an M.A. in linguistics from the University of Washington in 1967, followed by doctoral studies at UCLA, earning a Ph.D. in 1971.

Campbell has held appointments at the University of Missouri (1971–1974), the State University of New York at Albany (1974–1989), Louisiana State University (1989–1994), the University of Canterbury, in Christchurch, New Zealand (1994–2004), the University of Utah (2004–2010), and finally the University of Hawai'i at Manoa (2010–). He has been a visiting professor at Australian National University, Colegio de México, Memorial University, Ohio State University, University of Hamburg, University of Helsinki, National Autonomous University of Mexico, Universidad del País Vasco, University of Turku, and at three universities in Brazil. He has held joint appointments in Linguistics, Anthropology, Behavioral Research, Latin American Studies, and Spanish.

Campbell's research and teaching specializations include: historical linguistics, American Indian languages, documentation and revitalization of endangered languages, typology, sociolinguistics, linguistic anthropology, and Uralic languages.

Campbell is the author of 25 books and 200+ articles; two of his books (American Indian languages: The historical linguistics of Native America and Historical Syntax in Cross-Linguistic Perspectives, co-written with Alice C. Harris) were awarded the Leonard Bloomfield Book Award by the Linguistic Society of America for the best book in linguistics published two years prior. He is also co-founder of the Catalogue of Endangered Languages, and member of the Governance Council for the Endangered Languages Project.

== Published books ==
- Campbell, Lyle & Blair, Robert et al. (1971). Cakchiquel Basic Course. Provo: Peace Corps.
- Campbell, Lyle (1977). Quichean Linguistic Prehistory (University of California Publications in Linguistics, 81). Berkeley: University of California Press.
- Campbell, Lyle et al. (1978). Bibliography of Mayan Languages and Linguistics. Institute for Mesoamerican Studies, Publication 3. SUNY Albany.
- Campbell, Lyle & Mithun, Marianne (Eds.) (1979). The Languages of Native America: An Historical and Comparative Assessment. Austin: University of Texas Press.
- Campbell, Lyle (1980). El Idioma Cacaopera. (Colección Antropología e Historia, 16.) Administración del patrimonio cultural. San Salvador, El Salvador: Ministerio de Educación, Dirección de publicaciones.
- Campbell, Lyle & Justeson, John (Eds.) (1984). Phoneticism in Mayan Hieroglyphic Writing. (Institute for Mesoamerican Studies, Pub. 9.) SUNY Albany/University of Texas Press.
- Justeson, John, William Norman, Lyle Campbell & Terrence Kaufman) (1985). The Foreign Impact of Lowland Mayan Languages and Script. (Middle American Research Institute, publication 53.) New Orleans: Tulane University.
- Campbell, Lyle (1985). The Pipil Language of El Salvador. Berlin: Mouton Publishers.
- Campbell, Lyle (1988). The Linguistics of Southeast Chiapas. (Papers of the New World Archaeological Foundation, 51.) Provo, Utah.
- Migliazza, Ermnesto & Lyle Campbell (1988). Panorama General de las Lenguas Indígenas en las Amerícas. Historia General de América, tomo 10. Instituto Panamericano de Geografía e Historia. Caracas, Venezuela.
- Harris, Alice C. & Lyle Campbell (1995). Historical syntax in cross-linguistic perspective. Cambridge: Cambridge University Press. [Winner of the Leonard Bloomfield Book Award, 1998.]
- Hill, Jane, P. J. Mistry, & Lyle Campbell (Eds.) (1997). The Life of Language: Papers in Linguistics in Honor of William Bright. Berlin: Mouton de Gruyter.
- Campbell, Lyle (1997). American Indian languages: the historical linguistics of Native America. Oxford: Oxford University Press. ISBN 0-19-509427-1. [Winner of the Linguistic Society of America's "Leonard Bloomfield Book Award," 2000, for the best book in linguistics for the previous two years. Named 1998 Outstanding Academic Book by Choice.]
- Campbell, Lyle (Eds.) (2003). Grammaticalization: a critical assessment. (Special issue of Language Sciences, vol. 23, numbers 2–3.)
- Campbell, Lyle et al. (2004). New Zealand English: its Origins and Evolution. Cambridge: Cambridge University Press.
- Campbell, Lyle (2004). Historical Linguistics: an Introduction (2nd edition). Edinburgh: Edinburgh University Press, and Cambridge, MA: MIT Press.
- Campbell, Lyle and William J. Poser (2008). Language Classification: History and Method. Cambridge: Cambridge University Press. ISBN 978-0-521-88005-3.
- Campbell, Lyle and Verónica Grondona (Eds.) (2012). "The Indigenous Languages of South America: A Comprehensive Guide." Berlin: Mouton de Gruyter.
- Campbell, Lyle (ed.) (2017). Language Isolates. London: Routledge. ISBN 978-1-138-82105-7.
- Campbell, Lyle and Anna Belew (eds.) (2018). Cataloguing the World's Endangered Languages. London: Routledge. ISBN 978-1-138-92208-2.
- Rehg, Kenneth and Lyle Campbell (eds.) (2018) The Oxford Handbook of Endangered Languages. Oxford: Oxford University Press. ISBN 978-0-19-061002-9.
- Campbell, Lyle (2020). Historical Linguistics: an Introduction. Edinburgh: Edinburgh University Press. (4th edition.) [1st edition 1998–1999, 2nd edition 2004, 3rd edition 2013, 4th edition 2020].
- Campbell, Lyle, Luis Díaz & Fernando Ángel (2020). Nivaclé Grammar. Utah: Utah Press. ISBN 1-60781-775-6
- Campbell, Lyle (2024). The Indigenous Languages of the Americas. New York: Oxford University Press. ISBN 978-0-19-767346-1.

== See also ==
- Classification of indigenous languages of the Americas
