= List of unclassified languages of South America =

The following purported languages of South America are listed as unclassified in either Campbell (2024), Loukotka (1968), Ethnologue, or Glottolog. Nearly all are extinct. It is likely that many of them were not actually distinct languages, only ethnic or regional names.

== Campbell (2024) ==
Campbell (2024) lists the following languages of South America as unclassified. Most are extinct. Many were drawn from Loukotka (1968) and Adelaar & Muysken (2004). The majority are not listed in Ethnologue. The list is arranged in alphabetical order.

- Aarufi – Colombia
- Aburuñe – Bolivia; spoken near Pantanal
- Acarapi – Brazil
- Aconipa (Tabancale, Tabancara) – Ecuador; only 5 words known which are dissimilar to other languages
- Aguano (Awano, Ahuano, Uguano, Aguanu, Santa Crucino) – Peru; completely unattested but thought to be Arawakan
- Alarua – Brazil
- Alon – Peru; along the Huallaga River
- Amasifuin – Peru; along the Huallaga River
- Amikoana (Amikuân, Amicuan) – Brazil; appears to be nonexistent and is certainly extinct now, classified by Loukotka (1968) as a Cariban language related to Wayana, Arakajú and Apalaí
- Amoeca – Brazil
- Amuimo – Brazil
- Anetine – Bolivia
- Angara – Peru
- Anicum – Brazil
- ~~Anserma~~ (including Caramanta, Cartama) – Colombia, is considered Chocoan
- Aperea – Argentina
- Apitupá – Brazil
- Apiyipán – Bolivia
- Aracadaini – Brazil
- Arae – Brazil
- Aramayu – Brazil
- Aramurú – Brazil
- Arapoá – Brazil
- Ararau – Brazil
- ~~Arda~~ – Peru, Colombia; a misidentified vocabulary and texts of the West African language Popo (Gen)
- Arma (Arma-Pozo) – Colombia; known from one word only
- Aroásene – Brazil
- Artane – Bolivia; spoken near Pantanal
- Atavila – Peru
- Aticum (Araticum, Uamué) – Brazil; data from Meader (1978) likely to be faked
- Atunceta (Tunceta, Atunseta) – Colombia, unclassifiable for lack of data
- Aueiko – Brazil
- Avis – Brazil
- Ayacore – Peru
- Baenan (Baenã) – Brazil; only 9 words known
- Bagua – Peru; only 3 words known, thought to be Cariban and incorrectly conflated with likely related Patagón
- Baixóta – Brazil
- ~~Bakurönchichi~~ – Brazil; likely Arikapú
- ~~Barbacoas~~ (Barbácoa, Colima) – Colombia; ISO 639 code retired in 2020 for being nonexistent
- Bauá – Brazil
- Bikutiakap – Brazil
- Bixarenren – Brazil
- Boimé (Poyme) – Brazil
- Bolona – Ecuador; linked with Chicham and Cañari
- Bracamoro (Papamuru) – Peru
- Buritiguara – Brazil
- Caapina – Brazil
- Cabixi (Kabixi) - Mato Grosso, Brazil; a short word-list. The name 'Kabixí' is a generic name for any hostile group, and has been used for a number of unattested and already known languages. It may be tonal.
- Cachipuna – Peru
- Cafuana – Brazil
- ~~Cagua~~ – Colombia; ISO 639 code retired as spurious
- Caguan (Kaguan) – Argentina
- Cahan – Brazil
- Caimbé (Kaimbé, Caimbe) – Brazil; extinct, known from 7 words
- Cajamarca – Peru
- Cajatambo – Peru
- Camana (Maje) – Peru
- Camaraxo – Brazil
- Camaré – Brazil
- Campaces – Ecuador; possibly Barbacoan, with Tsafiki, but unconfirmed
- ~~Canelo (Penday)~~ – Ecuador; synonym of Shiwiar
- Cañacure – Bolivia
- Capua – Brazil
- Capueni – Brazil
- Cara (Scyri, Caranqui, Otavalo) – Ecuador; thought to be Barbacoan
- Caraguata – Brazil
- ~~Carapacho~~ – Peru; synonym of Kashibo
- Carára – Brazil
- Carari – Brazil, Amazonas; a short word-list recorded by Johann Natterer which shows no resemblance to known languages, but considered Arawakan
- Cararú (Cajurú) – Brazil
- Caripó (Curupeche) – Brazil
- Cascoasoa – Peru
- Casigara – Brazil
- Casota – Argentina
- Catuquinaru – Brazil; known only from a short wordlist
- Cauacaua (Kawakawa) – Brazil
- Cauauri – Brazil
- ~~Cauca~~ – Colombia; retired from ISO 639 for being nonexistent or synonymous with Quimbaya
- Caucahue – southern Chile; retired from ISO 639 for being nonexistent
- Cauni – Brazil
- Caupuna – Brazil
- Cavana (Maje) – Peru
- Caxago – Brazil
- Cayú – Brazil
- ~~Ceococe~~ – Brazil; synonym of Xocó
- Chachapoya (Chacha) – Peru; known entirely from toponyms and family names, linked with Cahuapanan, Hibito–Cholon, Copallén and the hypothetical -cat language of Cajamarca Department
- Chancay – Brazil
- ~~Chechehet~~ ("Pampa") – Argentina; Loukotka (1968) gives the words chivil 'two', chu 'earth', and hati 'great'. Is the same as Gününa Küne.
- Chedua – Peru
- Chicha – Bolivia
- Chincha – Peru
- Chinchipe – Peru
- ~~Chipiajes~~ – Colombia; retired from ISO 639 in 2016
- Chitarero – Colombia; classified as Chibchan by Loukotka (1968), unclassifiable for lack of data according to Adelaar (2004)
- Cholto – Peru
- Chongo – Peru
- Chono – Ecuador; synonym of Tsafiki according to Loukotka (1968)
- Chumbivilca – Peru; possibly a variety of Puquina; might be Aymaran
- Chunanawa – Peru; possibly Panoan based on suffix -nawa in Fleck (2013)
- Churima – Bolivia
- Chusco – Peru
- Ciaman – Colombia; classified as Chocoan by Loukotka (1968) unclassifiable for lack of data according to Adelaar (2004)
- Cognomona – Peru; along the Huallaga river
- Colima – Colombia; possibly Cariban, linked with Pijao
- Colima – Ecuador; classified as Barbacoan by Loukotka (1968) and distinct from the possibly Cariban Colima above
- Comanahua – Peru; along the Huallaga river
- Comaní – Brazil
- Comechingón – near Córdoba, Argentina; possibly Huarpean, very few words known
- Copallén (Copallín) – Peru; only 4 words known
- Coritananhó – Brazil
- ~~Coxima~~ (Koxima) – Colombia; retired from ISO 639 in 2016 for having no evidence of its existence
- Culaycha – Argentina
- Cumayari – Brazil
- ~~Cumeral~~ – Colombia; purportedly Arawakan but retired from ISO 639 in 2016
- Cumbazá (Belsano) – Peru
- Curanave – Brazil
- Curi – Brazil
- Curiane – northeastern South America; precise location unknown
- Curierano – Brazil
- Curizeta – Peru
- Curubianan – Brazil
- Curumiá – Brazil
- Curuzirari – Brazil
- Cutaguá – Brazil
- Cutría – Brazil
- Cuximiraíba – Brazil
- Cuxiuára – Brazil
- Damanivá – Brazil
- Demacuri – Brazil
- Diaguita (Cacan, Kakán) – northwest Argentina; subdivisions are Calchaquí, Capayán, Catamarcano, Hualfín, Paccioca [Pazioca], Pular, Quilme, Yacampis
- ~~Divihet~~ – Argentina; considered a synonym of Gününa Küne
- Dokoro – Brazil
- Duri – Brazil
- Egualo – Argentina
- Eimi – Peru
- Emischata – Argentina
- ~~Emok~~ – Paraguay; retired in 2014 for being nonexistent, is not the name of any language
- Envuelto – Colombia; 8 words known
- Erema – Brazil
- Ewarhuyana – Brazil; 12 Ewarhuyana people in Pará State, who now speak Tiriyó
- Foklása – Brazil; the ethnic group speaks Fulniô according to the Fulni-ô ethnic group
- Gadio – Brazil
- Galache (Galaxe) – Brazil
- Gambéla – Brazil
- Gamela (Gamela of Viana, Curinsi, Acobu, Gamella) – Maranhão, Brazil, 19 words known
- Garañun – Brazil; listed by Louktka (1968) as a Xukuruan language but undocumented
- Gorgotoqui – Bolivia; all documentation lost, possibly Bororoan
- Goyana – Brazil
- Guaca – Colombia; known from only one word, being guaca 'devil'
- Guacará – Argentina
- Guadaxo – Brazil
- Guaimute – Brazil
- Guajarapo (Guasaroca) – Bolivia
- Guanaca – Colombia; possibly a relative of Guambiano (Barbacoan)
- Guane – Colombia; possibly Chibchan but no documentation
- Guanarú – Brazil
- Guanavena – Brazil
- Guarino – Brazil
- Guenta – Colombia
- Guyarabe – Brazil
- Hacaritama – Colombia; supposed wordlist shown to be from Wayuu
- Harritiahan – Brazil
- Hiauahim (Javaim) – Brazil
- Himarimã – Brazil; uncontacted group, apparently Arawan based on a lost wordlist
- Huancavilca – Ecuador; extinct, only 4 words known
- Huamachi – Peru
- Humahuaca (Omaguaca) – Argentina; known from only proper names, apparent subdivisions are Fiscara, Jujuy, Ocloya, Osa, Purmamarca, Tiliar; Mason (1950:302) proposed an "Ataguitan" grouping that includes Humahuaca, Diaguita, and Atacameño
- ~~Huambuco~~ (Wámpuku) – Peru; alternative name for the Aguaruna people
- Huayana – Peru
- Huayla – Peru
- ~~Iapama~~ (Ápama) – Brazil; retired in 2016 from ISO 639 due to absence of evidence of existence, uncontacted group synonymous with either Wayampi or Apalaí
- ~~Ibabi Aniji~~ – Peru, name of a river inhabited by the Ese Ejja people (Huarayo)
- Idabaez – Colombia; only 1 word (tubete 'medicine man') and a chief's name (Hijuoba) are known; Pacific coast, Bahía Solano to Cape Marzo in Colombia (Loukotka 1968)
- Imaré – Brazil
- Ina – Brazil
- Iñajurupé – Brazil
- Irra – Colombia; unclassifiable for lack of data, listed as Chocoan by Loukotka (1968)
- Iruri – Brazil
- Isolados do Massaco (?) – Brazil; possibly identified with Sirionó or Papiamän
- Isolados do Tanarú (?) – Brazil (Man of the Hole)
- Itipuna – Brazil
- Itucá (Cuacá) – Brazil
- Jacariá – Brazil
- Jaguanai – Brazil
- Jaguanan – Brazil
- Jamundi – Colombia; no data
- Jeticó (Jiripancó) – Brazil; the Jiripancó are descendants of the Pankararú
- Jitirijiti (Jitirigiti) – Colombia; no data
- Jurema – Brazil
- Juruena – Brazil
- Jururu – Brazil
- ~~Kamba~~ (Camba) – Brazil; retired as spurious from ISO 639; either Eastern Bolivian Guaraní or duplicate of Chiquitano
- Kambiwá (Cambiuá, Cambioá) – Brazil; extinct and known from only a few words
- ~~Kantaruré~~ – Brazil; the Kantaruré are descendants of the Pankararú but their linguistic identification is impossible
- Kapinawá – Brazil; extinct, possibly descended from the Paratió
- ~~Karahawyana~~ (Karapawyana, Karafawyana) – Brazil; now classified as a dialect of the Waiwai language
- Katembri (Kariri de Mirandela) – Brazil
- Kiapüre (Quiapyre) – Brazil
- ~~Kohoroxitari~~ – supposedly possibly Tucanoan; is actually the name of a Sanöma-speaking village
- Kokakôre – Brazil
- Komokare – Brazil
- ~~Korubo~~ (Caceteiros) – Brazil; known to be Panoan
- Koshurái – Brazil
- Kurumro (Curumro) – Paraguay; identified by Loukotka (1931) as related to an Mascoian-speaking group
- Kururu – Brazil
- Lache – Colombia; may be Chibchan, but no data
- Lambi – Brazil
- Lili – Colombia; may be Yurumangui, but no data
- Llamish – Peru
- Macamasu – Brazil
- Macarú – Brazil
- Macuani – Brazil
- Macuarê – Brazil
- Macuja – Brazil
- Macuruné – Brazil
- Mairajiqui – Brazil
- Malaba – Ecuador; may be Barbacoa (Chibchan), but no data
- Malibú – Colombia; formerly considered Chibchan
- Malquesi – Argentina
- Manesono (Mopeseano) – Bolivia
- Manta (Manabi) – Ecuador; possibly Chimú, but only a few patronyms are known
- Maracano – Brazil
- Marapaña – Brazil
- Maricoxi – Brazil
- Maricupi – Brazil
- Maripá – Brazil
- Maruquevene – Brazil
- Masa – Argentina
- Masarari – Brazil
- Masaya – Colombia
- Mashco – Peru; uncontacted, possibly related to Piro (Arawakan), or "Preandine" (Arawakan), known from 24 words
- Matará – Argentina; may be related to Tonocoté
- ~~Maynas~~ (Mayna, Maina, Rimachu) – Peru; a Cahuapanan language, past attempts to link it to Jivaroan, Zaparoan, and Candoshi
- Maxiena (Ticomeri) – Bolivia; completely unknown
- Mayu – Brazil; possibly the same as Mayo (Panoan) or Morike (Arawakan); mayu is the Quechuan word for 'river, water'
- Menejou – Brazil
- Minhahá – Brazil
- Mocana – Brazil; may be related to Malibú, but only 2 words known
- Mocoa – Colombia; may be related to Kamëntšá
- ~~Miarrã~~ – Brazil; retired from ISO 639 for being unattested
- Moheyana – Brazil
- Morcote – Colombia; may be Chibchan, but no data
- Moriquito – Brazil
- Morua – Brazil
- Moyobamba (Moyo-Pampa) – Peru
- Muriva – Brazil
- Mure – Bolivia; apparently not Chapacuran as previously thought
- Muzapa – Peru
- Muzo – Colombia; may be Pijao (Cariban)
- Nacai – Brazil
- Nambu – Bolivia
- ~~Natagaimas~~ – Colombia; retired from ISO 639 as a synonym of Pijao
- Natú – Brazil; known from 18 words, unclassified
- Nauna – Brazil
- Nindaso – Peru
- Nocadeth – Brazil
- Nomona – Peru
- Nori – Colombia; unclassifiable for lack of data
- Ñumasiara – Brazil
- Ocro – Peru
- Ocren – Brazil
- Ohoma – Argentina; may be the same as Hohoma or Mahoma
- Oivaneca – Brazil
- Olmos – Peru; possibly connected with Sechura
- ~~Omejes~~ – Colombia; retired in 2016 from ISO 639 for being nonexistent
- Onicoré – Brazil
- Onoyóro – Brazil
- Orí – Brazil
- Ortue (Ortu, Urtue) – Bolivia
- Otecua – Peru
- Otegua – Colombia
- Otí (Eochavante, Chavante) – Brazil; Greenberg classifies it as Macro-Gê, though this is unlikely according to Ribeiro (2006:422), otherwise considered isolate, only 110 words known
- Pacabuey – Colombia; may be Malibú, but no data
- Pacarará (Pakarara) – Brazil
- Pacimonari – Venezuela
- Paguara – Brazil
- Panatagua (Panatahua, Panatawa) – Peru; extinct, possibly Arawakan, presumed Panoan based on ethnonym by Fleck (2013)
- Panche – Colombia; possibly Cariban
- Pankararé (Pankaré) – Bahía, Brazil; extinct and unattested, can only be assumed to be a dialect of Pankararú
- Pankararú – Brazil; too poorly known to be classified but sometimes considered an isolate
- Pantágora (Palenque) – Colombia
- Pao – Venezuela
- Papamiän – Brazil; may be the same as the "Isolados do Massaco"
- Papana – Brazil
- ~~Papavô~~ – Brazil; uncontacted, may be Arawakan or Panoan (?), according to Glottolog, refers to groups of Harákmbut, Kulina, Amawaka and Yawanawa
- Paragoaru – Brazil
- Paraparixana – Brazil
- Parapicó – Brazil
- ~~Patagón~~ – Peru; Cariban, only 4 known words
- Patiti – Brazil
- Payacú – Brazil
- Payanso – Peru; along the Huallaga river
- Pehuenche (Peguenche) – Argentina; distinct from Pehuenche dialect of Mapudungun
- Peria (Poria) – Brazil
- Perovosan – Bolivia
- Piapia – Brazil
- Pijao (Piajao, Pixao, Pinao) – Colombia; sometimes grouped with Cariban
- Pipipan (Pipipã) – Brazil
- Pocoana – Brazil
- ~~Ponares~~ – Colombia; retired from ISO 639 in 2016
- Porcá – Brazil
- Porú (Procáze) – Brazil
- Pubenza (Popayan) – Colombia; linked with Coconucan languages
- Puná (Lapuná) – Ecuador
- Puscajae (Pile) – Colombia; classified as Yurumanguí by Loukotka (1968)
- Quelosi – Argentina
- Querandí (Carendie) – Argentina, near Buenos Aires; may be related to Gününa Küne. Loukotka (1968) gives the words zobá 'moon' and afia 'bow'
- Quiquidcana (Quidquidcana, Kikidkana) – Peru
- Quijo (Kijo) – Ecuador; may be Barbácoan, but only 3 words are known
- Quillacinga (Quillasinga) – Ecuador; may be Sebondoy; Fabre (1998:676) reports that the Kamsa (Camsá, speakers of a language isolate) are descended, at least in part, from the Quillasinga
- Quimbaya – Colombia; may be Chocó, but only 8 words are known
- Quiambioá – Brazil; likely synonym for Kambiwá
- Quindío (Quindio) – Colombia
- Quingnam – Peru; extinct, possibly the same as and geographcally related to Lengua (Yunga) Pescadora of colonial sources; according to Quilter et al. (2010), a list of numbers was found
- Quirigmã (Qurigmã [sic]) – Brazil
- Rabona – Ecuador; possibly Candoshi (Murato), but there are similarities with Aguaruna (Jivaroan)
- Ramanos – Bolivia; known from 8 words
- Roramí (Oramí) – Brazil
- Sácata (Sacata, Zácata, Chillao) – Peru; extinct; may be Candoshi or Arawakan, but only 3 words known
- Sacosi – Bolivia
- Sacracrinha (Sequaquirihen) – Brazil
- Sanavirón – Argentina, near Córdova. Loukotka classified it as an isolate, but there is insufficient data (only 6 or 7 words) to justify this.
- Sapeiné – Peru
- Seden
- Shinabo – Bolivia; unattested but apparently related to Chácobo
- Siberi – Bolivia
- Sinú (Zenú) – Colombia; may be Chocó, but no data
- Sintó (Assek, Upsuksinta, Dawainomol, Axata Darpa) – Paraguay. 6 words recorded.
- Sipisipi – Peru
- Socorino – Bolivia
- Stanatevogyet (Upsucksinta, Moianek)? – Paraguay; possibly "remnant of the [Matacoan] Enimaga-Guentuse"
- Supeselo – Argentina
- Surucosi – Bolivia
- ~~Suruim~~ – Brazil; apparently synonymous with Surui (Paiter)
- Tacunbiacu – Bolivia
- Taguaylen – Argentina
- Tacarúba (Tacarua) – Brazil
- ~~Taluhet~~ – Argentina; see Chechehet
- Tamacosi – Bolivia
- Tamaní – Colombia
- Tamaquéu – Brazil
- Tamararé – Brazil
- Tambaruré – Brazil
- Taminani – Brazil
- Tanquihua – Peru
- Tapacurá – Brazil; not to be confused with Chapacura language
- ~~Tapeba~~ – Brazil; the Tapeba have a mixed origin and do not have any specific ancestral language
- Tapuisú – Brazil
- Tarairiú (Tarairiu, Ochucuyana) – Brazil
- Tarimoxi – Brazil
- Taripio – Brazil, Suriname
- Tavúri – Brazil
- Tchagoyána – Brazil
- ~~Tchicoyna~~ (Tchikoyána) – Brazil; synonym of Sikiana
- Tegua (Tecua) – Colombia; grouped with Caquetío by Loukotka (1968)
- Tepqui – Peru; along the Huallaga river
- Tevircacap – Brazil
- Tiboi – Bolivia
- Timaná (Timane) – Colombia; may be Andaquí (isolate) but no data
- Tingán – Peru
- Tingui-Boto – Brazil; extinct; also known as Tingui, Tingui-Botó, Carapató, Karapató, Tingui-Botó people's ancestral language is Dzubukuá
- Tobachana – Brazil
- Tohazana – Venezuela
- Tomata – Bolivia
- ~~Tomedes~~ – Colombia; retired from ISO 639 in 2016
- Tomina – Bolivia
- Tonocoté – Argentina, Chaco region; known from one sentence
- Tororí – Brazil
- Truká – Brazil; unattested
- Tremembé (Teremembé, Taramembé) – Brazil; unattested
- ~~Tubichaminí~~ – Argentina; grouped by Loukotka with Querandí and Chechehet; is apparently a name for certain regional groups of Querandí
- Tucumanduba – Brazil
- Tulumayo – Peru
- Tupijó – Brazil
- Tupiokón – Brazil
- Tutura – Bolivia
- Tuxá – Brazil; wordlists are inconsistent
- Uairua – Brazil
- Uauarate – Brazil
- Unainuman (Vuainuman) - Içá River basin, short word list, Adelaar & Brijnen 2014
- Uranaju – Brazil
- Urucuai – Brazil
- Uruma – Brazil
- Uru-Pa-In – Brazil; possibly Tupian language of isolated group
- Urupuca – Brazil
- Ururi – Brazil, Mato Grosso
- Vanherei – Brazil
- Vouve (Vouvê) – Brazil
- Waitaká (Guaitacá, Goyatacá, Goytacaz) – Brazil; subdivisions are Mopi, Yacorito, Wasu, Miri, possibly Purian
- Wakoná (Wacona, Acona) – Brazil; unattested
- Walêcoxô – Brazil
- Wamoé – Brazil; wordlists likely to be faked
- Wasu (Waçu, Wassu) – Brazil; unattested
- Wau – Peru
- Xaquese (Xaquete) – Bolivia
- ~~Xaray (Xaraye)~~ – Bolivia; synonymous with Saraveca, an Arawakan language
- Xibata – Brazil
- Xipará – Brazil
- Xipináwa – Brazil; claimed to be Panoan but unattested
- Xiroa – Ecuador; mentioned in early sources, and may be a variant spelling of Jívaro
- Xokó (Chocó, Shoco, Shokó, Chocaz) – Brazil; only a few words known
- Yalcón – Colombia; may be Andaquí (isolate), but no data
- Yamesí – Colombia; may be Antioquian (Chibchan), but only 1 word known
- Yampará – Bolivia
- Yaperú (Naperú, Apirú) – Paraguay
- ~~Yarí~~ – Colombia; supposedly either a Carijona (Cariban) dialect, West Tucanoan, or Witotoan, retired from ISO 639 in 2016
- Yariguí (Yarigüí) – Colombia; may be related to Opone (Karaib), but no data (Yarigui people)
- Yauei – Brazil
- Yenmu – Colombia
- Yoemanai – Brazil
- Yufiua – Brazil
- Yumbo – Ecuador; may be Barbácoa (Barbacoan) or Panzaleo, but no data
- Yurimagua (Zurimagua, Jurimagua) – Peru
- Zapazo – Peru
- Zuana – Brazil
- Zurina – Brazil

== Ethnologue ==
Ethnologue 26 lists the following languages of South America as unclassified:

- ~~Abishira~~ (Peru – generally considered an isolate)
- ~~Agavotaguerra~~ (Brazil – unattested, apparently Yawalapití)
- Aguano (Peru)
- ~~Carabayo~~ (Colombia – linked with Ticuna–Yuri languages)
- Himarimã (Brazil – apparently Arawan)
- Kaimbé (Brazil)
- Kambiwá (Brazil)
- Kapinawá (Brazil)
- ~~Lule~~ (Argentina – either an isolate or Lule–Vilela)
- Mato Grosso Arára (Brazil)
- Pankararé (Brazil)
- Pijao (Colombia)
- ~~Pumé~~ (Yaruro, Venezuela – generally considered an isolate)
- ~~Shenenawa~~ (Brazil – a Panoan language)
- ~~Tingui-Boto~~ (Brazil – synonymous with Dzubukuá)
- Tremembé (Brazil)
- Truká (Brazil)
- Wakoná (Brazil)
- Wasu (Brazil)

However, Glottolog states that Agavotaguerra is not unclassified, but unattested; the only reports are that the Agavotaguerra speak Yawalapiti. Shanenawa and Lule are both considered to belong to other language families, Panoan and Lule-Vilela respectively; Tingui-Botó is not a language but an ethnic group which originally spoke Dzubukuá, and Awishira and Pumé (Yaruro) are generally considered isolates.

== Glottolog ==
In addition to many of the languages above, Glottolog lists the following:

- ~~Apoto~~ - lower Amazon, unattested; recorded as speaking the lingua geral in 1639 by Cristóbal Diatristán de Acuña
- Cálenche (Cálen) = Fayjatases - Chile, 10 words
- Guachipa(s) - Guachipas, Argentina, 3 words, Viegas Barros (2009)
- Guaicaro (Guaïcaro) - Chile, possibly Central Alacaluf
- Haxa - Colombia
- Tapajó - 3 words
- Tembey - upper Paraná, 2 words, Ambrosetti (1896:332)
- Urucucú(s) - Tapajós River, unattested
- Yanacona - name is the Quechua word for 'serf'; perhaps early Colombian Quechua

== Other ==
Some additional languages have not made in into the lists above.

- Boreal Pehuelche - Argentina, 1 word (apparently not the same as Puelche)
- Enoo - Chile, a few words (a neighbor of the Alacalufe); has been proposed to be a "mixed language" of Yahgan-Chonan origins

== See also ==
- Category:Unclassified languages of South America
- Extinct languages of the Marañón River basin
- List of extinct languages of South America
- List of extinct languages of North America
- List of extinct Uto-Aztecan languages
- Classification of indigenous languages of the Americas
- Indigenous languages of the Americas
- Languages of South America
- List of indigenous languages of South America
- List of unclassified languages of North America

Brazil

- List of indigenous peoples of Brazil
- List of indigenous territories (Brazil)
