= Natú people =

Natú
Total population
- unknown

Regions with significant populations
- Brazil

Languages
- formerly Natú

The Natú are an Indigenous people of Brazil, living in the Northeast Region. They are very poorly known and it is not even known where their original homeland was, though as of 1935 they resided in Porto Real do Colégio, Alagoas.

== History ==
Nothing is known of their original history. According to Raoul Zamponi, their descendants were living in Porto Real do Colégio in 1935. In 1952, descendants of the Natú lived in Pacatuba, Sergipe.

== Language ==
The Natú language is thought to be an isolate, but only 18 words of it are known. This is insufficient to determine its linguistic affinity.

== See also ==
- Xokó
