= Extinct languages of northern Peru =

Extinct languages of the Andes

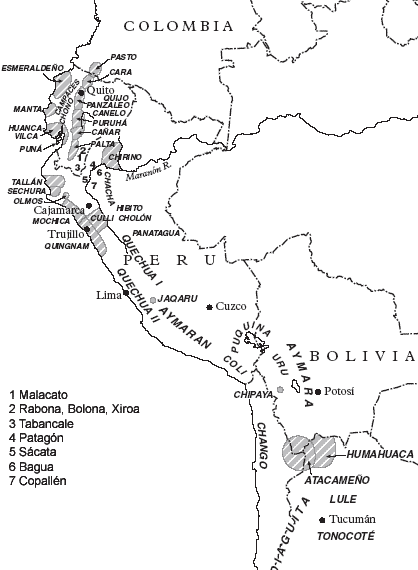
Pre-Inca languages in the 16th century

Historically, the region of northern Peru once harbored numerous languages of diverse linguistic affiliations. Most of them are poorly attested or not attested at all.

Those of the middle reaches of the Marañón River, above the Amazon basin, were replaced in historical times by Aguaruna, a Chicham language from the Amazon which is still spoken there. The languages further upriver are difficult to identify, due to lack of data. The region was multilingual at the time of the Conquest, and the people largely switched to Spanish rather than to Quechua, though Quechua also expanded during Colonial times.

In Ecuador, at the province of Loja, were Palta, Malacato, Rabona, Bolona, and Xiroa. Historical sources suggest these were closely related, and there is some evidence that Palta was a Jivaroan language. The name Xiroa may be a variant of Jivaro. Rabona is attested by a few words, some of which seem to be Jivaroan, but others of which appear to be Candoshí; since these are plant names, they say little about the classification of the language, and Adelaar (2004:397) leaves it unclassified. Bolona is essentially unattested.

North of the basin were Puruhá (scarcely attested), Cañari (known primarily from characteristic place names), Panzaleo (sometimes classified as Paezan), Caranqui (until the 18th century, seemingly Barbacoan), and Pasto (Barbacoan). Apart possibly from Panzaleo, these languages have elements in common, such as a final syllable -pud and onsets mwe-, pwe-, bwe-. Those suggest that they may have been related, and possibly were all Barbacoan. Adelaar (2004:397) finds this more likely than a proposal that Puruhá and Cañari were Chimuan languages.

In Peru, and further up in the Andes there were also numerous languages. Apart from Mochica and Cholón, the languages of northern Peru are largely unrecorded; the attested Marañón languages are Patagón (Patagón de Perico), Bagua (Patagón de Bagua), Copallén, Tabancale (Aconipa), Chirino, and Sácata. Three more languages, known as -den, -cat, and Chacha (Chachapoya), are not directly documented but known through characteristic suffixes in proper names, including family names and toponyms.

== Attested languages ==
=== Patagón ===
Patagón (Patagón de Perico, not to be confused with the Chonan languages of Tierra del Fuego and Patagonia): Four words are recorded, tuná 'water', anás 'maize', viue 'firewood', coará 'sheep' (evidently the word for 'sloth'). These suggest that Patagón was one of the Cariban languages, and therefore, like Aguaruna, from the Amazon.

=== Bagua ===
Bagua (Patagón de Bagua) is attested by three words, tuna 'water', lancho 'maize', nacxé 'come here'. Tuna 'water' suggests it may be a Cariban language, like Patagón de Perico, but is insufficient evidence for classification.

=== Copallén ===
Four words are attested from Copallén (Copallín): quiet [kjet] 'water', chumac 'maize', olaman 'firewood', ismare 'house'. It was spoken in villages of Llanque, Las Lomas, and Copallen, department of Cajamarca.

=== Tabancale ===
Five words of Tabancale (Tabancal, Aconipa) are recorded: yema 'water', moa 'maize', oyme 'firewood', lalaque [lalake] 'fire', tie 'house'. These do not correspond to any known language or family, so Tabancale is unclassified and potentially a language isolate. It was spoken in Aconipa, department of Cajamarca.

=== Chirino ===
Chirino
- Native to: Peru
- Region: Marañón River basin
- Ethnicity: Chirino
- Extinct: (date missing)
- Language family: Candoshian: Chirino

Language codes
- ISO 639-3: None (mis)
- Glottolog: chir1297

The Chirino were one of the principal peoples of the area. Based on the four words which were recorded, yungo 'water', yugato 'maize', xumás 'firewood', paxquiro [paʃˈkiɾo] 'grass', their language would appear to be related to Candoshi.

=== Sácata ===
Three words of the language of Sácata (Zácata), apparently that of the Chillao people, are recorded: unga 'water', umague [umaɡe] 'maize', chichache 'fire'. Connections have been suggested with Candoshi (the word for water is similar to that of Chirino) and Arawakan, but the evidence is insufficient.

=== Rabona ===
Rabona
- Native to: Ecuador
- Ethnicity: Rabona
- Extinct: (date missing)
- Language family: Candoshi ?: Rabona

Language codes
- ISO 639-3: None (mis)
- Glottolog: None

Rabona, formerly spoken in the district of Santiago de las Montañas in Ecuador, is poorly attested. Based on limited evidence, predominantly plant names, many sources have grouped Rabona with Candoshi-Shapra.

== Unattested languages ==
=== Chacha ===
Chacha is the name sometimes given to the language of the Chachapoya culture. The Chachapoya, originally from the region of Kuelap to the east of the Marañón, were conquered by the Inca shortly before the Spanish conquest, and many were deported after the Inca Civil War. They sided with the Spanish and achieved independence for a time, but were then deported again by the Spanish, where most died of introduced disease. Their language is essentially unattested apart from toponyms and several hundred family names, which are mostly short and have been distorted through adaptation to Quechua.

== Vocabulary ==
The following is a vocabulary table for Patagón, Bagua, Chacha, Copallén, Tabancale, Chirino, Palta (Xoroca) and Sácata, with Candoshi, proto-Taranoan and proto-Arawakan forms given for comparison, combined from data given in the sections above:

	Patagón	Bagua	Copallén	Tabancale	Chirino	Sácata	Palta	Candoshi	proto-Taranoan	proto-Arawakan
water	tuná	tuna	quiet [kjet]	yema	yungo	unga	yumé	kógó	*tuna	*hʊnɨ / *wene
maize	anás	lancho	chumac	moa	yugato	umague [umaɡe]	xemé	yovato	*a(ː)naci	
firewood	viue		olaman	oyme	xumás		let	sorama	*wewe 'wood/tree'	*tsɨma
fire				lalaque [lalake]		chichache	capal	somaasi		*dika-ri
house			ismare	tie				pagoosi		*-pana
sheep	coará								*(w)arekore 'sloth'	
grass					paxquiro [paʃˈkiɾo]			chirĭchirĭ		
come here		nacxé							*(ə)e[pi] 'come'	

== See also ==
- List of unclassified languages of South America
- List of extinct languages of South America
- List of indigenous languages of South America
- Classification of indigenous languages of the Americas
- Omurano language
- -den language
