= Patagón language =

Patagón language may refer to:

- Tehuelche language, of Argentina
- Patagón language (Peru)
