= Pacatuba =

Pacatuba may refer to the following places in Brazil:

- Pacatuba, Sergipe
- Pacatuba, Ceará
