= Xukuru-Kariri =

Total population
- 1,700 (2020)

Regions with significant populations
- Alagoas

Languages
- Xukuru, Kariri, Wakona (formerly); Portuguese

The Xukuru-Kariri are an Indigenous people of Brazil, living in the states of Alagoas, Bahia, and Minas Gerais. They numbered 1,700 in 2020.

== History ==
The Xukuru-Kariri were formed from a number of Indigenous peoples living in the region of the Serra da Cafurna near Palmeira dos Índios. The Xukuru and Kariri peoples were predominant in the region. A number of Kariri groups merged with the Wakóna or Aconã, and the Carapotó; in 1938, the surviving Wakóna already called themselves Xukuru-Kariri. The Xukuru are reported to have migrated from Cimbres (now Pesqueira) in 1740, the Kariri at a later date from Porto Real do Colégio, and the Waconã from the São Francisco River.

In 2016, a leader of the Xukuru-Kariri people, João Natalício Xukuru-Kariri, was stabbed to death outside his home; reports suggested that two men had murdered him.

== Location ==
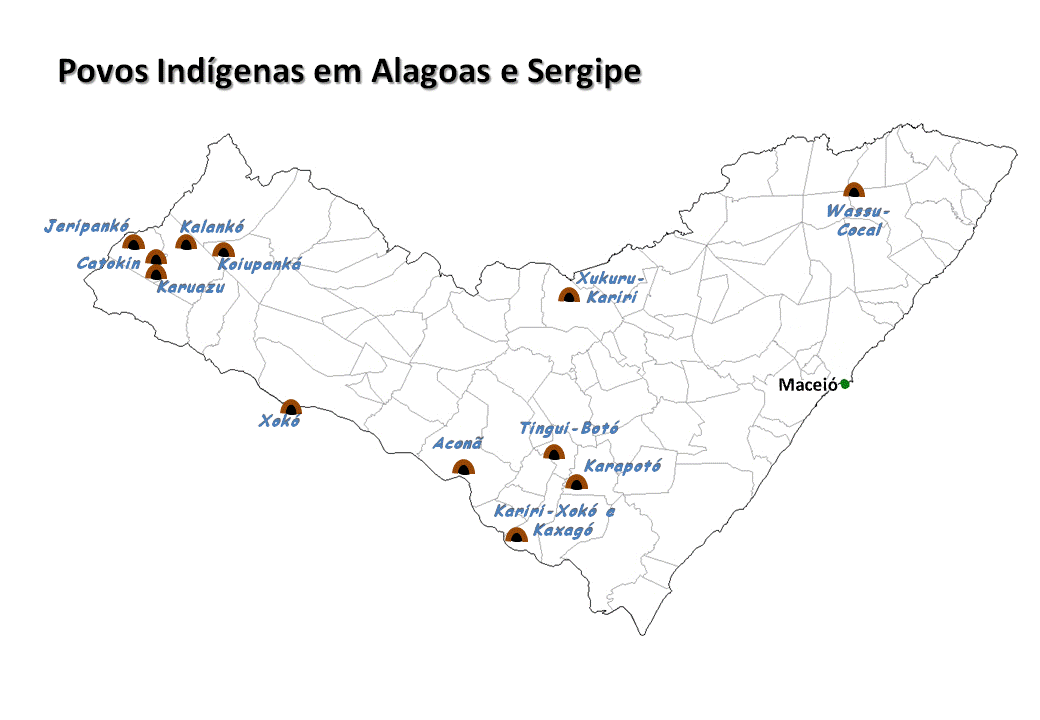
Map of Indigenous peoples of Alagoas

The Xukuru-Kariri reside predominantly in the Xukuru Kariri Indigenous Territory, located in Palmeira dos Índios.
