= Meruoca =

Municipality in Ceará, Brazil

Coordinates: 3.54194°S 40.455°W

- Municipality
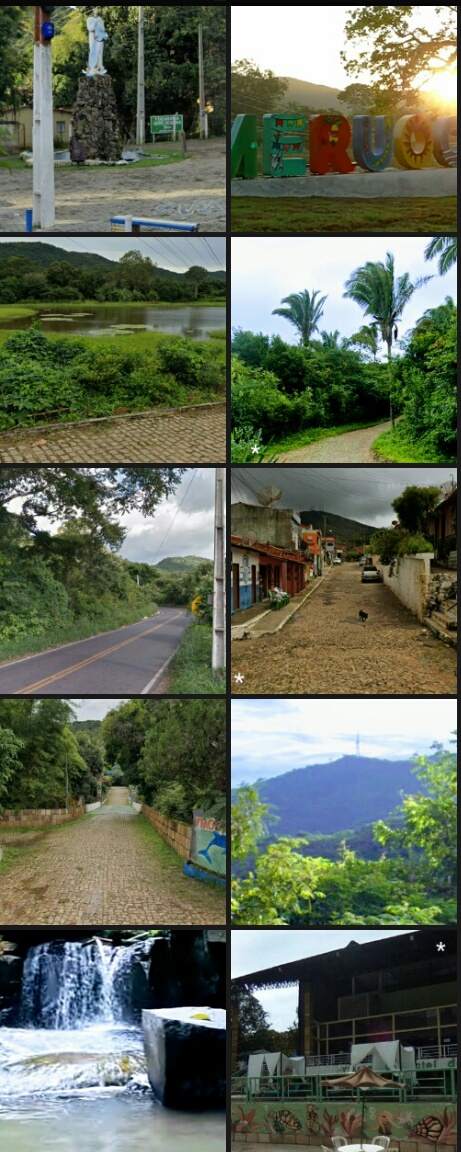

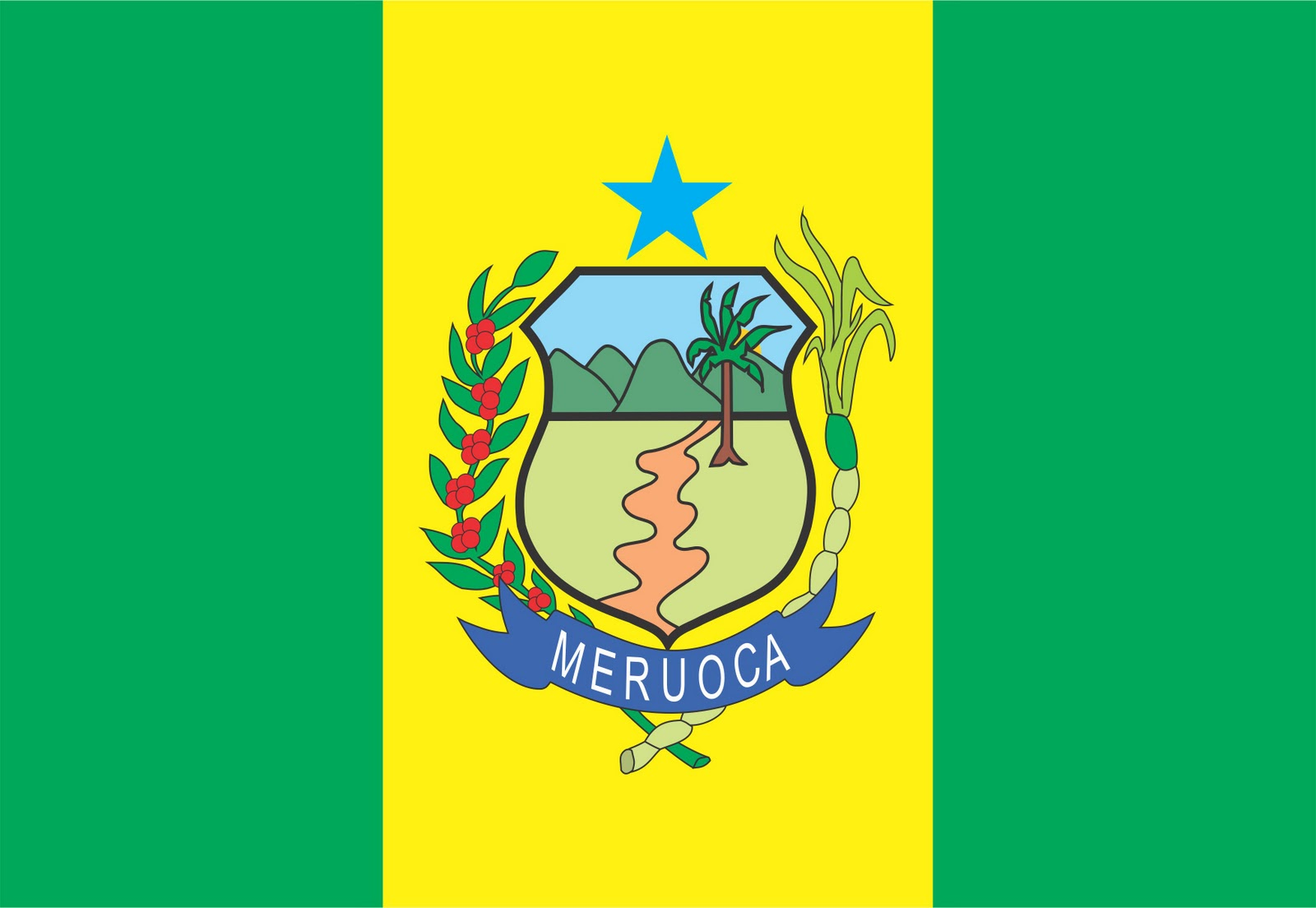
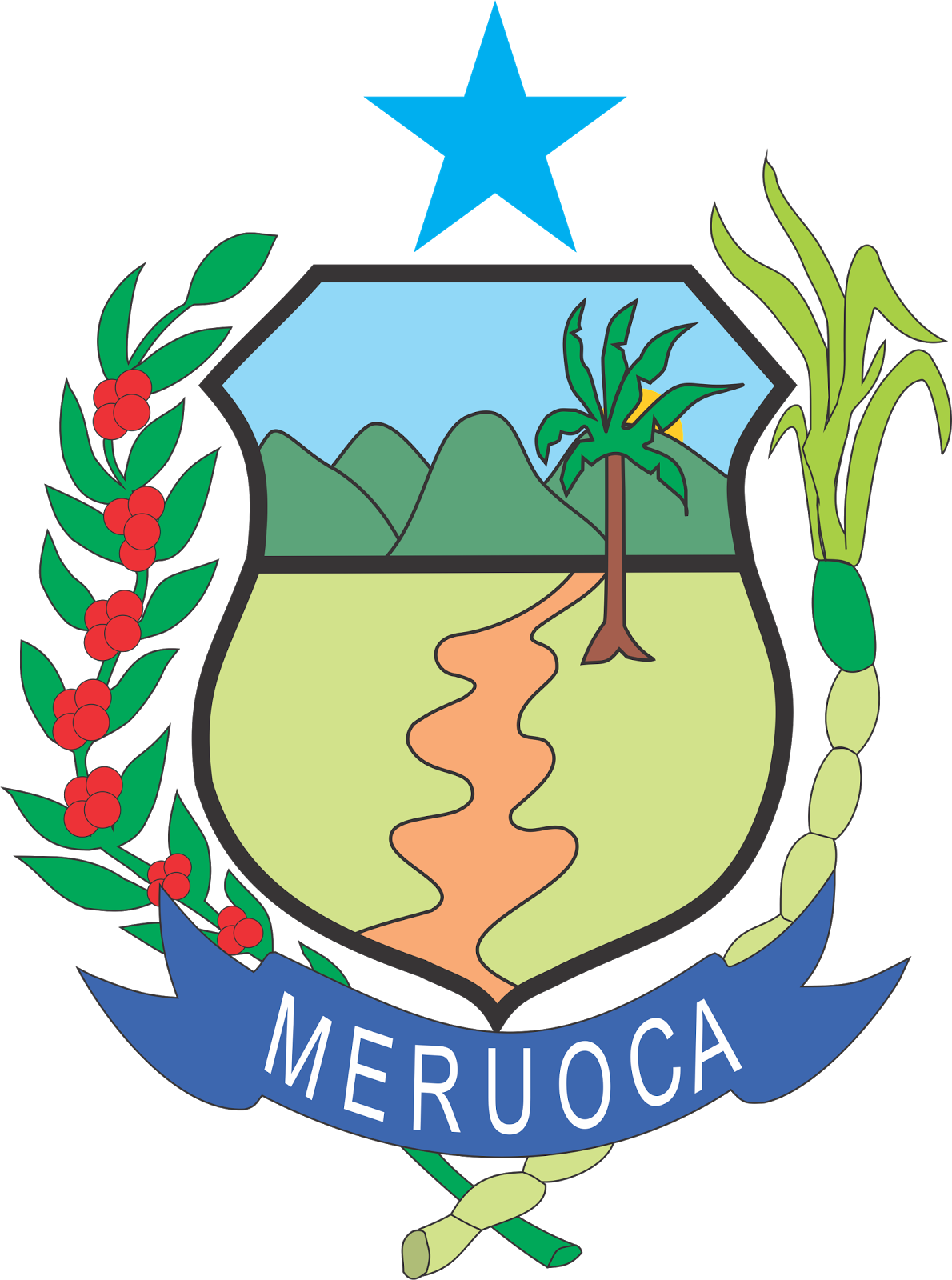
- Flag Coat of arms
- Interactive map of Meruoca
- Country: Brazil
- Region: Nordeste
- State: Ceará
- Mesoregion: Noroeste Cearense

Population (2020)
  - Total: 15,185
- Time zone: UTC−3 (BRT)

Meruoca is a Brazilian municipality in the state of Ceará . Its estimated population on 07/01/2019 is 15,057 inhabitants. From its lands spring crystal-clear waters that sometimes flow across the relief in splendid waterfalls and "enchanting" waterfalls and that, at other times, pass through patient and sliding granites, sculpting them. With the approval of State Complementary Law No. 168/2016, the municipality became part of the Sobral Metropolitan Region .

== History ==
The unclassified extinct Arariú language was spoken around Meruoca on the Acatajú River.

== See also ==
- List of municipalities in Ceará
