= Lule–Vilela languages =

Language family

Lule–Vilela
- Geographic distribution: northern Argentina
- Native speakers: 2 rememberers (2007, Vilela)
- Linguistic classification: One of the world's primary language families
- Subdivisions: Lule †; Vilela (†); ?Tonocoté †

Language codes
- Glottolog: None
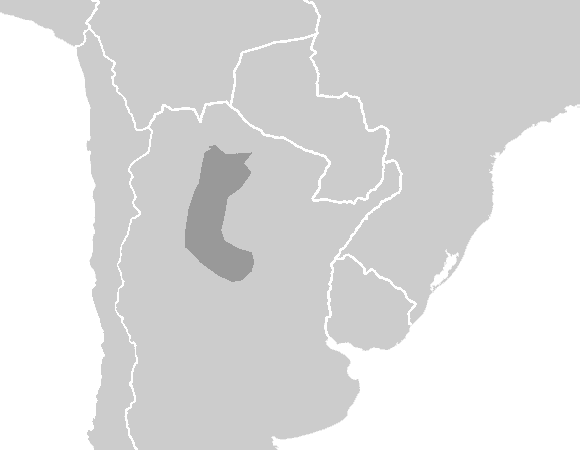

The two Lule–Vilela languages constitute a small, extinct, distantly related language family of northern Argentina. Kaufman found the relationship likely and with general agreement among the major classifiers of South American languages. Viegas Barros published additional evidence from 1996 to 2006. However, Zamponi (2008) considers Lule and Vilela each as language isolates, with similarities being due to contact.

== Internal classification ==
Internal classification of the Lule–Vilela languages by Mason (1950):

- Lule–Vilela
  - Lule
    - Great Lule (of Miraflores, of Machoni)
    - Small Lule
      - Isistiné
      - Tokistiné
      - Oristiné
  - Vilela
    - Atalalá
    - Chunupí (Sinipé, Chulupí)
      - Yooc (Yoo, Wamalca)
      - Ocolé
      - Yecoanita
    - Pasain (Pazaine)
    - Omoampa (Umuapa)
    - Vacaa
    - Vilela
    - Ipa
    - Takete
    - Yoconoampa (Yecunampa)
    - Wamalca
    - (Malbalá ?)

Unclassfied languages are Tonocoté, Matará, and Guacará.

== Proto-language ==
For reconstructions of Proto-Lule-Vilela by Viegas Barros (2006), see the corresponding Spanish article.
