= Joaquim Gomes, Alagoas =

Municipality in Alagoas, Brazil

Joaquim Gomes
- Municipality of Alagoas, Brazil
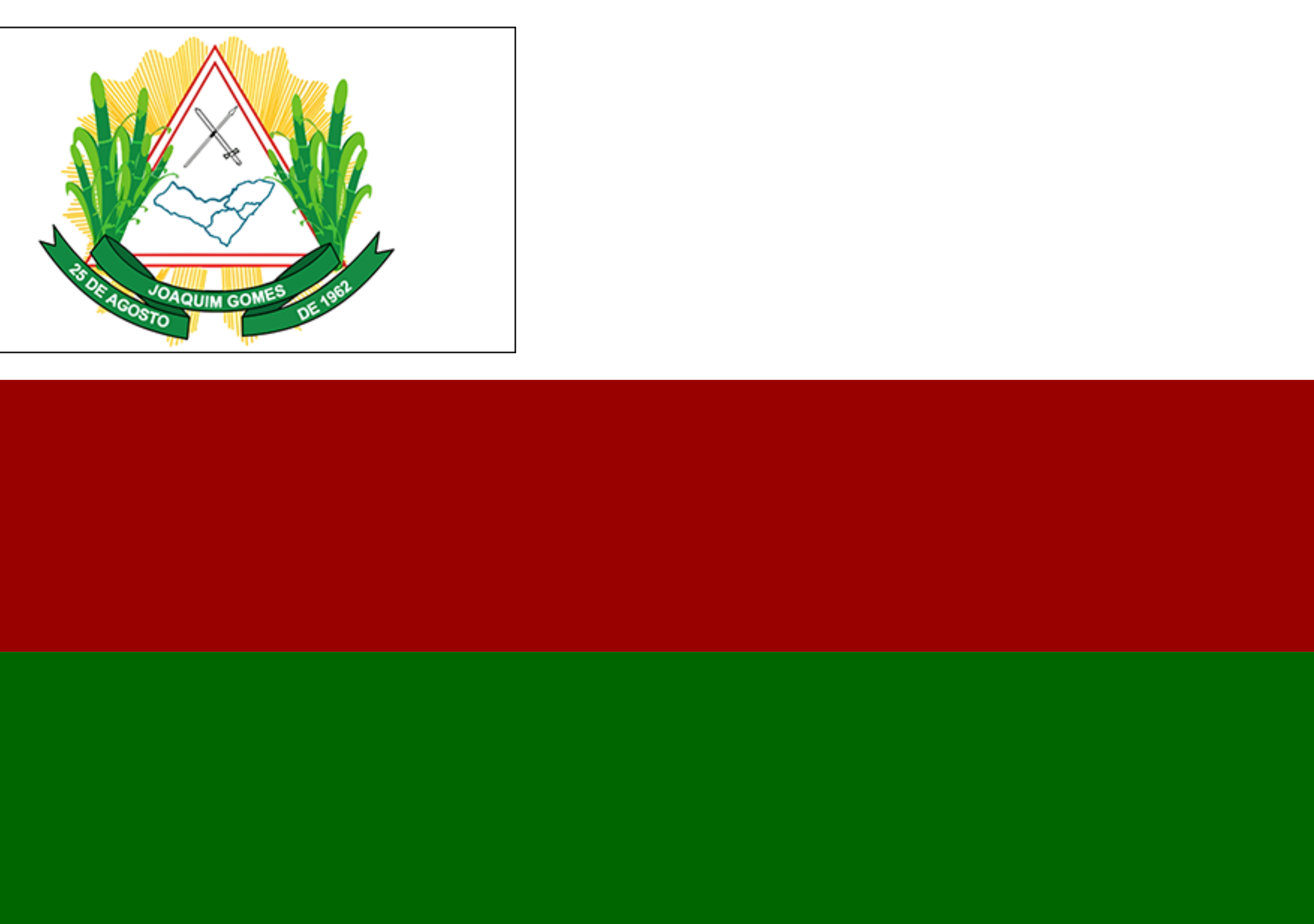
- Flag
- Etymology: Named after the city's founder Joaquim Gomes Silva Rêgo
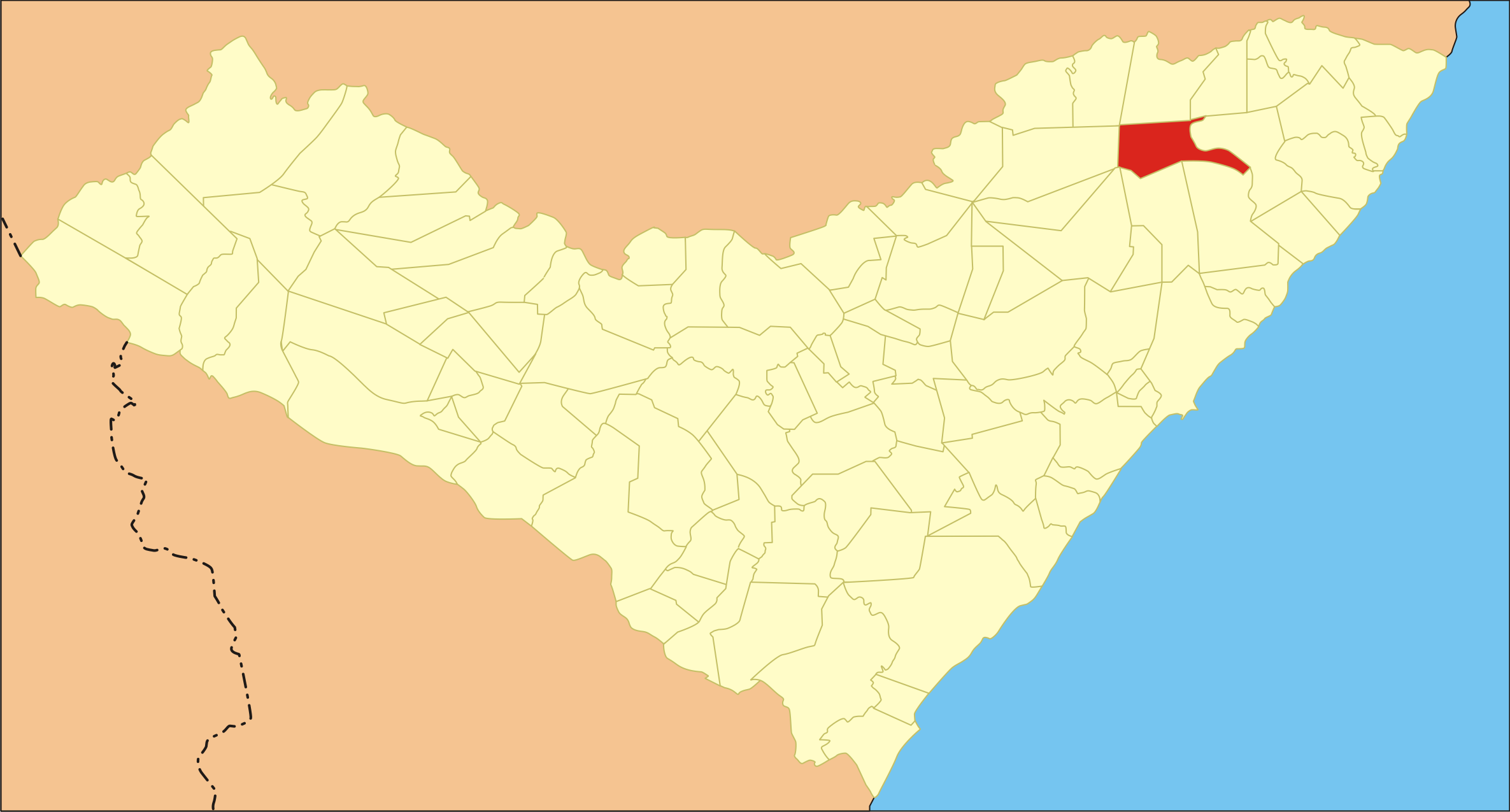
- Location of Joaquim Gomes in Alagoas

- Location within Brazil Location within South America
- Coordinates: 9°8′15″S 35°45′15″W
- Country: Brazil
- Region: Northeast
- State: Alagoas
- Founded: 25 August 1962

Government
  - Mayor: Rita de Cassia Cavalcante Andrade de Morais (MDB) (2025-2028)
  - Vice Mayor: Amilson Rafael Silva de Souza (Republicanos) (2025-2028)

Area
  - Total: 298.170 km^{2} (115.124 sq mi)
- Elevation: 104 m (341 ft)

Population (2022)
  - Total: 17,150
  - Density: 57.52/km^{2} (149.0/sq mi)
- Demonym: Joaquimgomense (Brazilian Portuguese)
- Time zone: UTC-03:00 (Brasília Time)
- Postal code: 57980-000
- HDI (2010): 0.531 – low
- Website: joaquimgomes.al.gov.br

Joaquim Gomes (Central northeastern portuguese pronunciation: [ʒuɐˈkĩ ˈɡõmis]) is a municipality located in Alagoas, Brazil. It had a population of 24,081 as of 2020, and an area of 239 km^{2} (92 sq mi).

The extinct and unattested Wasu language was spoken in the Serra do Azul of Joaquim Gomes.

== See also ==
- List of municipalities in Alagoas
