= Shawi language =

Cahuapanan language spoken in Peru

Shawi
- Cahuapana, Chayahuita
- Kanpunan
- Native to: Peru
- Ethnicity: 21,400 kanpupiyapi (2011)
- Native speakers: 14,000 (2011)
- Language family: Cahuapanan: Chayahuita–Maynas; Shawi

Language codes
- ISO 639-3: cbt
- Glottolog: chay1248
- ELP: Chayahuita

Shawi (Chayahuita, Chayahuita: Kanpunan 'our language') is an endangered Amazonian language spoken by thousands of native Chayahuita people in the Amazon basin of north-central Peru. Spoken along the banks of the Paranapura, Cahuapanas, Sillay, and Shanusi rivers, it is also known as Chayawita, Shawi, Chawi, Tshaahui, Chayhuita, Chayabita, Shayabit, Balsapuertino, Paranapura, and Cahuapa. It is one of the most actively spoken languages in its region.

== Classification ==
Together with the nearly extinct Shiwilu language, Shawi is a member of the Cahuapanan languages.

== Dialects ==
Three dialects of Shawi are distinguished, Cahuapana, Chayahuita, and Paranapura.

== Status ==
25,239 speakers of Shawi were recorded in 2017 according to the Peruvian Ministry of Culture. Its linguistic vitality is very high for a language in the Peruvian Amazon, and children are monolingual in the language until they begin school, when they are first exposed to Spanish. Speakers of the language hold much pride in Shawi, though the villages in which it is spoken are assimilating, which may lead to the loss of the language.

== Phonology ==
Orthographical equivalents are presented in ⟨angle brackets⟩.

Vowels
	Front	Central	Back
Close	i	ɘ ⟨e⟩	u
Open		a	

Consonants
	Labial	Alveolar	Palatal	Velar	Glottal
Stop	p	t	t͡ʃ ⟨ch⟩	k	ʔ ⟨ꞌ⟩
Fricative		s	ʃ ⟨sh⟩		(ʰ ⟨h⟩)
Nasal	m	n			
Rhotic		r			
Approximant	w		j ⟨y⟩		

/ʰ/ is not recognized by Rojas-Berscia (2019) as a separate phoneme, as it is exclusive to certain phonetic environments. Most consonants, including all plosives or fricatives, may not occur in the coda of a syllable. The glottal stop, however, may only occur in the coda.

== Writing system ==
There is a 1–5% literacy rate, compared with 5–15% for Spanish, and a dictionary since 1978. The New Testament was also translated into Shawi.

== Vocabulary ==
Selected Shawi animal names from Rojas-Berscia (2019):

Selected animal names
Common name	Scientific name	Shawi
possum	Didelphis marsupialis	anashi
lowland paca	Cuniculus paca	ipi'
red squirrel	Sciurus spadiceus	pu'shi
bicolor porcupine	Coendou bicolor	sese
common rat	Rattus norvegicus	shumi
agouti	Dasyprocta punctata	ite'
capybara	Hydrochoerus hydrochaeris	tucusu'
pichico monkey	Saguinus fuscicollis	ishi'
Amazon condor	Sarcoramphus papa	tame
silver mylossoma	Metynnis argenteus	shite'
black prochilodus	Prochilodus nigricans	wanki
armored catfish	Pseudorinelepis genibarbis	warate'
wolf fish	Hoplias malabaricus	a'nanan
peccary	Pecari tajacu	kiraman
jaguar	Panthera onca	ni'ni'
tapir	Tapirus terrestris	pawara
giant otter	Pteronura brasiliensis	ini'
kinkajou	Potos flavus	kuwasha'
red howler	Alouatta seniculus	nu'nu'
yellow-tailed woolly monkey	Oreonax flavicauda	sura'
squirrel monkey	Saimiri sciureus	isen
bald uakari	Cacajao calvus	tekerenan
owl monkey	Aotus miconax	kuwi
spider monkey	Ateles belzebuth	tu'ya
pink dolphin	Inia geoffrensis	sapana'
shusupe	Lachesis muta	na'shi
common lancehead	Bothrops atrox	tayuwan
boa	Boa constrictor	kupiwan
wattled curassow	Crax globulosa	i'sa
bayuca caterpillar	Lonomia obliqua	tiwintata'
