= Santa Isabel Biological Reserve =

- Reserva Biológica de Santa Isabel
- IUCN category Ia (strict nature reserve)
- Location within Brazil
- Nearest city: Aracaju
- Coordinates: 10°37′44″S 36°41′35″W
- Area: 5,547 hectares (13,710 acres)
- Designation: Biological Reserve
- Created: 20 October 1988

Santa Isabel Biological Reserve (Portuguese: Reserva Biológica de Santa Isabel) is a biological reserve on the coast of the municipalities of Pacatuba and Pirambu in Sergipe, Brazil.

== Location ==
The coastal marine reserve, with an area of 5,547 hectares (13,710 acres), was created on 20 October 1988. It is administered by the Chico Mendes Institute for Biodiversity Conservation. It lies in the municipalities of Pacatuba and Pirambu in Sergipe state. The reserve is mainly a sandbank, with remnants of Atlantic Forest in its interior. There are some grasses, coconut trees, shrubs, lagoons and mangroves. Migratory birds include the common tern (Sterna hirundo). Tropical mockingbird (mimus gilvus) and pectoral antwren (herpsilochmus pectoralis) are endemic.

== Conservation ==
The Biological Reserve is a "strict nature reserve" under IUCN protected area category Ia. The purpose is to protect the biota without direct human interference other than actions needed to restore and preserve the natural balance, biological diversity and natural ecological processes. The critically endangered hawksbill sea turtle (eretmochelys imbricata) is protected in the reserve.

== Sources ==
- Rebio de Santa Isabel (in Portuguese), Chico Mendes Institute for Biodiversity Conservation
- Unidade de Conservação: Reserva Biológica de Santa Isabel (in Portuguese), MMA: Ministério do Meio Ambiente
