= Tapajó language =

Extinct language of Brazil

Tapajó
- Tapajocos
- Tapajó
- Region: Tapajós and Amazon Rivers
- Ethnicity: Tapajó people
- Era: attested 17th century
- Language family: Arawakan: Tapajó

Language codes
- ISO 639-3: None (mis)
- Glottolog: tapa1261

The Tapajó language is an extinct and unclassified language, considered by the Tapajó people to have been Arawakan. In the 1660s, it, along with the language of the neighboring Urucucú, was used for catechism, as the people did not speak Tupinamba (the lingua geral). Records of the language have been lost. All that remain are three names: Tapajó as the name of the tribe, the name of their chief, Orucurá, and Aura, the Christian devil. These names cannot be explained as Tupi. Nothing appears to have been preserved of the neighboring Urucucú language. The Tapajó people report that their language was of the Arawakan family.

The Tapajós river is named after the Tapajó people.
