= Shiwilu language =

Language of Peru

Shiwilu
- Jebero
- Native to: Peru
- Region: Jeberos
- Ethnicity: 2,500 Shiwilu (2000)
- Native speakers: 30 (2012)
- Language family: Cahuapanan: Shiwilu

Language codes
- ISO 639-3: jeb
- Glottolog: jebe1250
- ELP: Shiwilu

Shiwilu (Jebero, Chebero, Xebero, Xihuila) is a moribund Amazonian language spoken by the Shiwilu people of Jeberos, Peru. It is spoken by only a small number of older adults and belongs to the Cahuapanan family together with Shawi.

== History ==
The Shiwilu are first mentioned in 1638 after a visit by Father Lucas de la Cueva to them. The language was first documented in the 17th century, and two manuscripts from the mission era are known and were held in the British Museum in 1961.

== Status ==
As of 1961, the language was spoken by about 1,500 people. Today, however, Shiwilu is critically endangered, and is spoken by only 30 elderly people, all of them bilingual in Spanish. A few passive speakers of Shiwilu in their 40s also extst, but the younger generation speaks only Spanish. No survey grammar or dictionary of Shiwilu has been made as of 2011, and the only linguist who had done any work up until "very recently" before 2011 was John Bendor-Samuel, who did fieldwork on Shiwilu between October 1955 and August 1956 and published his doctoral thesis on the language.

== Classification ==
Shiwilu is a member of the Cahuapanan language family, together with the Shawi language, which is still vital in comparison with Shiwilu. This relationship was recognized by Henri Beuchat and Paul Rivet (1909).

== Geographical distribution ==
Shiwilu is largely spoken in the area of Jeberos, Peru. Previously, it was distributed between the Marañón and Huallaga Rivers, though still centred in Jeberos.

== Phonology ==
=== Vowels ===
Monophthongs of Shiwilu, from Valenzuela & Gussenhoven (2013:101)

Monophthong phonemes
	Front	Central	Back
Close	i		u
Mid		ɘ	
Open		a	

- /i/ varies between close front unrounded [i], near-close front unrounded [i̞] and close-mid front unrounded [e].
- /u/ varies between near-close near-front rounded [ʊ] and close-mid back weakly rounded [o̜], with the latter realization being the most usual.
- /ɘ/ varies between mid near-front unrounded [ɛ̽] and close-mid central unrounded [ɘ].
  - /ɘ/ is shorter than the other vowels, particularly between voiceless consonants.
  - The sequence /ɘn/ is sometimes realized as a syllabic [n̩].
- /a/ varies between open central unrounded [ä] and near-open retracted front [æ̠]. The vowel chart in Valenzuela & Gussenhoven (2013) puts /a/ in the near-open central position [ɐ].
  - In closed syllables, /a/ is realized as open-mid central unrounded [ɜ].

=== Consonants ===
Consonant phonemes
		Labial	Alveolar	Palatal	Velar	Glottal
Nasal		m	n	ɲ		
Stop		p	t		k	ʔ
Affricate				tʃ		
Fricative			s	ʃ		(h)
Trill	plain		r			
Trill	glottalized		ˀr			
Approximant	central	w	ð̞	j		
Approximant	lateral		l	ʎ		

- /m, p/ are bilabial, whereas /w/ is labialized velar.
- /tʃ/ is an affricate, rather than a plosive.
- /n, t, ð, l/ are laminal denti-alveolar [n̪, t̪, ð̪, l̪].
  - In the syllable coda, /n/ is realized with a wider contact, maximally dentoalveolo-velar [n̪͡ŋ].
  - After /u, a/, the denti-alveolar contact is often not made, which makes /n/ sound more like a velar nasal [ŋ].
  - /ð/ may sometimes sound as if it were a lateral consonant, but it is never realized as lateral.
- /ɲ, ʎ/ are dentoalveolo-palatal [ɲ̪, ʎ̪].
  - /ʎ/ is sometimes realized as a weak fricative [ʎ̪˔].
- /h/ occurs only in the affirmative interjection [ahã].
- /r/ is realized as a flap [ɾ] in the syllable onset and as a trill [r] in the syllable coda.
- /ˀr/ is a glottalized flap [ˀɾ]. Intervocalically, it is realized as a sequence [ɾʔ].

== Typology ==
Shiwilu is typologically agglutinative with some inflection Four parts of speech are distinguished in all, the verb, nominal, adverb, and particle. It largely employs suffixes, and prefixes can only be found on verb forms.

== Bibliography ==
- Valenzuela, Pilar M.; Gussenhoven, Carlos (2013). "Shiwilu (Jebero)". Journal of the International Phonetic Association. 43 (1): 97–106. doi:10.1017/S0025100312000370.
