= Malibu languages =

Extinct language group of Colombia

Malibu
- Geographic distribution: Department of Magdalena, Colombia
- Linguistic classification: unclassified
- Subdivisions: Malibú †; Mocana †; Mompox †

Language codes
- Glottolog: None mali1242 Malibu proper
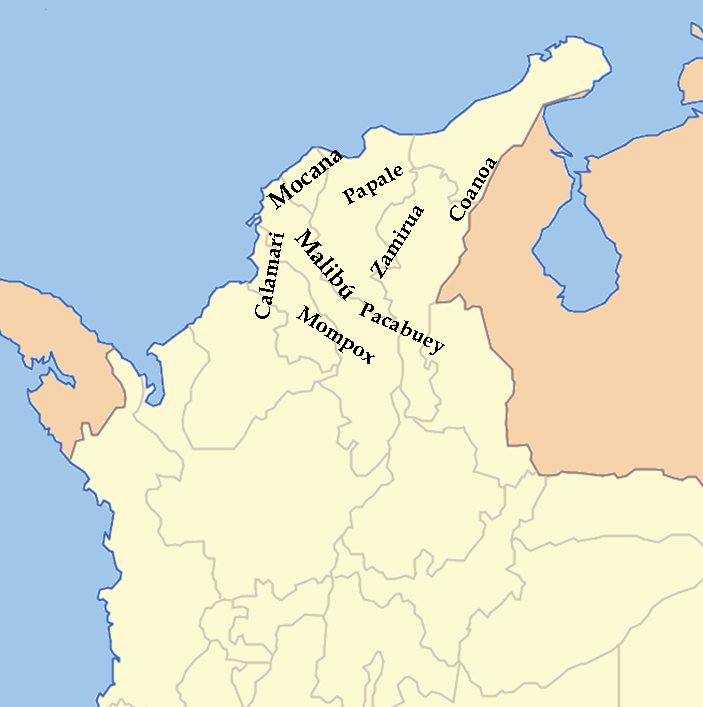
- Pre-contact distribution of the Malibu languages

The Malibu languages are a poorly attested group of extinct languages once spoken along the Magdalena River in Colombia. Material exists only for two of the numerous languages mentioned in the literature: Malibú and Mocana.

== Classification ==
The Malibu languages have previously been grouped with the Chimila language within the Chibchan languages. However, Adelaar & Muysken regard the grouping of Chimila with the Malibu languages as "without any factual basis".

== Family division ==
Rivet listed three Malibu tribes, each with its own language:

- Malibú, spoken near the Magdalena River from Tamalameque to Tenerife
- Mocaná (Oruck), spoken by the Mokaná people in the region east of Cartagena (Rivet 1947b; Simón 1882-1892, vol. 4, p. 298, only two words.)
- Pacabuey, also known as Sompallón or Laguna Malibu, spoken near the Zapatoza lagoon (Unattested.)

To this list, Loukotka adds six more languages, all of which are unattested (excluding Chimila):

- Papale, spoken on the Fundación River
- Coanoa or Guanoa, spoken on the Cesar River
- Zamirua, spoken on the Ariguaní River
- Cospique, spoken somewhere in the Department of Magdalena
- Mompox, spoken near the city of Santa Cruz de Mompox (attested per Rivet 1947)
- Calamari, spoken along the coast south of Cartagena to Coveñas
