= Copallén language =

Extinct language

Copallén
- Copallín
- Native to: Peru
- Region: Marañón River basin
- Extinct: (date missing)
- Language family: unclassified (Cholon?)

Language codes
- ISO 639-3: None (mis)
- Glottolog: copa1238

Copallín (Copallén) is an extinct language of the Marañón River basin formerly spoken in Peru.

== Geographical distribution ==
It was spoken in villages of Llanque, Las Lomas del Viento, and Copallín, department of Cajamarca.

== Vocabulary ==
Four words are attested from Copallén (Copallín): quiet [kjet] 'water', chumac 'maize', olaman 'firewood', and ismare 'house'. The word for water resembles the toponymic element -cat, posited to be an otherwise unknown language of the region. However, this is insufficient to identify Copallén as a Cholónan language.
