= Xokó =

Indigenous people of northeastern Brazi

Xokó, Xocó, Shokó
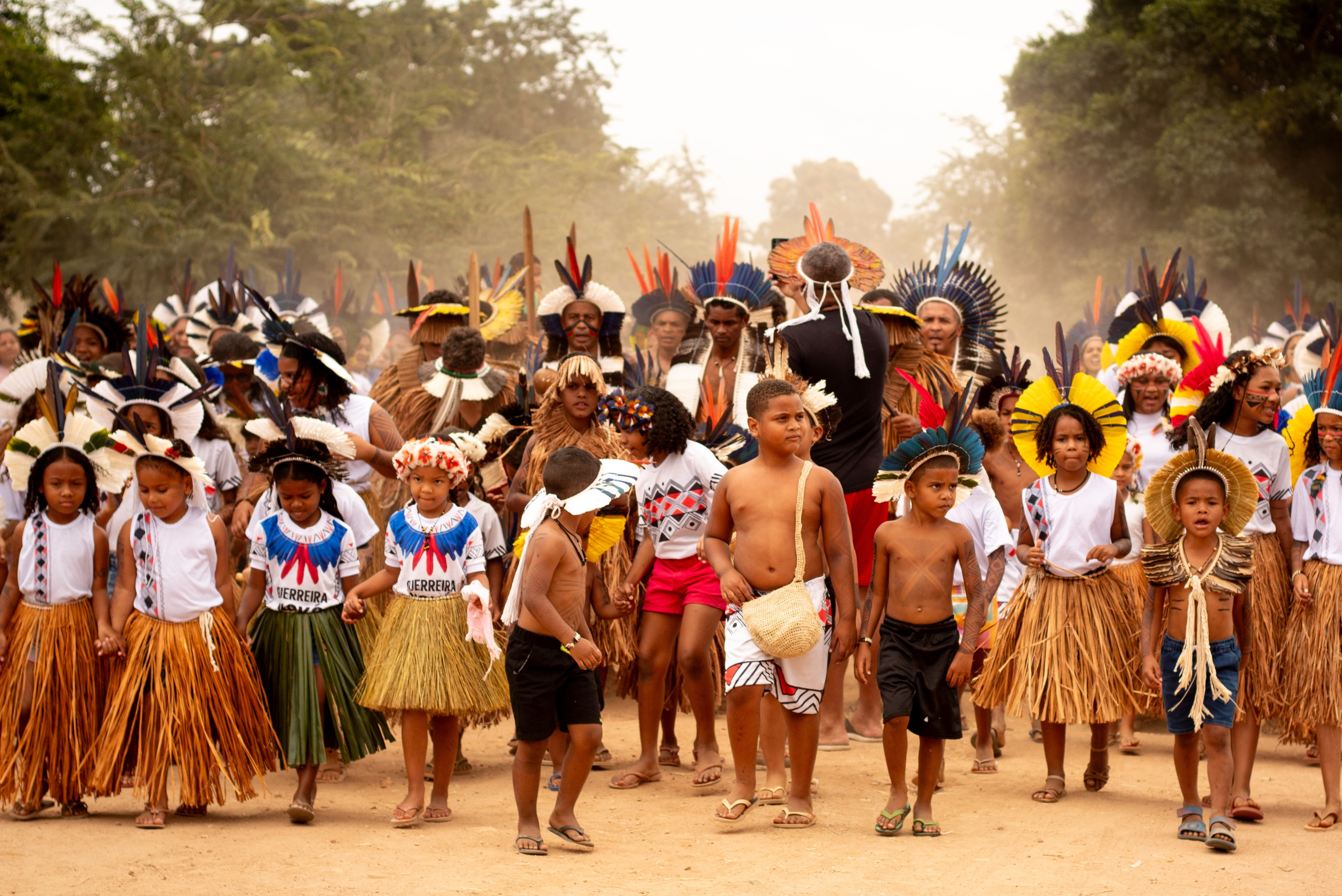

Total population
- 340 (2014)

Regions with significant populations
- Brazil (Sergipe, Alagoas)

Languages
- Formerly Xocó (now extinct), Portuguese

Religion
- Toré, Catholicism

Related ethnic groups
- Kariri-Xocó, Kariri, Xukuru-Kariri

The Xokó (Ceococe) are an Indigenous people of northeastern Brazil, whose traditional territory is centered along the lower São Francisco River, primarily in the state of Sergipe, with historical connections to neighboring Alagoas. The Xokó are among the few remaining native groups in this region.

== Territory and population ==
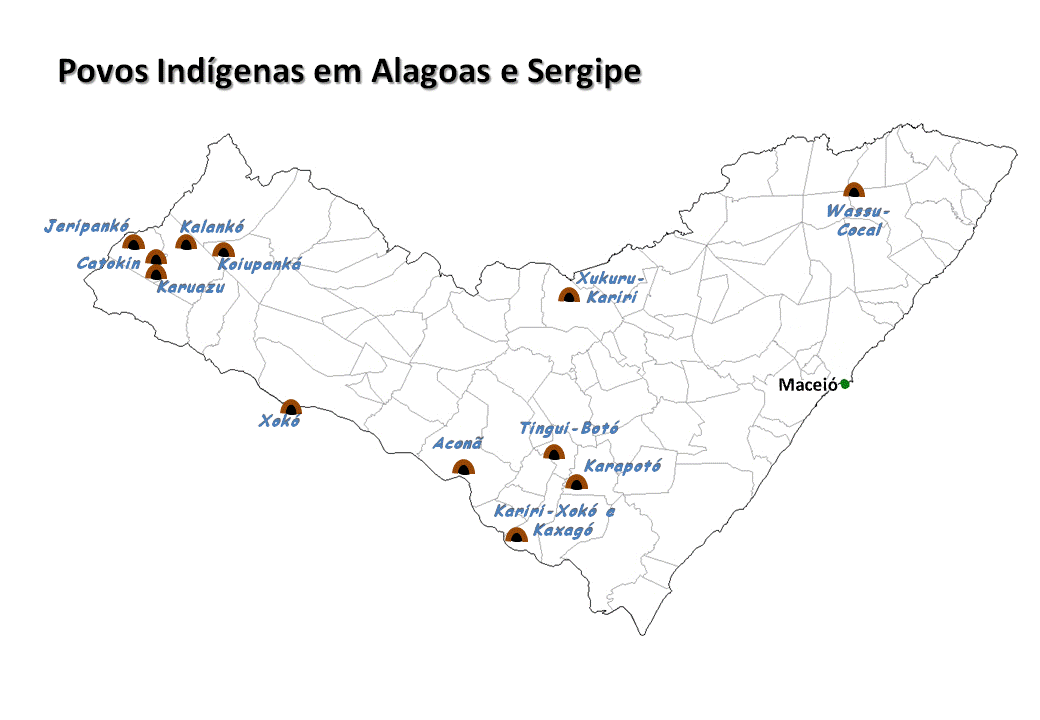
Map of Indigenous peoples of Alagoas

The Xokó inhabit the Ilha de São Pedro (Island of St. Peter) in the municipality of Porto da Folha, Sergipe, and some surrounding mainland communities. They are thought to be the only Indigenous group inhabiting the state of Sergipe. Their population is estimated at around 340 people, though numbers may vary. The Xokó are closely related to the Kariri-Xocó and Xukuru-Kariri peoples of neighboring Alagoas.

== Language ==
The original Xocó language is considered extinct and today the Xokó speak Portuguese. The language was not clearly classified and is known only from a few words collected in the 20th century. It is unclear whether it was related to the languages of the Kariri-Xocó or Xukuru-Kariri peoples.

== History ==
The Xokó are descendants of various Indigenous groups who survived the colonial period and the Jesuit missions along the São Francisco River. Over centuries, they endured forced labor, land dispossession, and assimilation pressures by the Portuguese. By the late 20th century, the Xokó had lost much of their land and traditional practices but maintained their communal organization and Indigenous identity.

In the 1970s and 1980s, the Xokó led a successful movement to reclaim their ancestral territory on Ilha de São Pedro, resulting in the legal recognition of their land rights.

== Culture and religion ==
The Xokó maintain elements of their traditional culture, including ritual practices, crafts, and festivals that blend Indigenous and Catholic elements. They are known for their annual Toré ritual, a dance and spiritual ceremony that reinforces community bonds and cultural memory.
