= Cabixi language =

Extinct and unclassified language of Brazil

Cabixi
- Cabixi-Natterer
- Native to: Brazil
- Region: Mato Grosso
- Era: attested 19th century
- Language family: unclassified

Language codes
- ISO 639-3: None (mis)
- Glottolog: cabi1242

Cabixi is an extinct and unclassified language, formerly spoken on the Steinen River in the state of Mato Grosso, Brazil. It is known only from a list of words collected by Johann Natterer. It may have been tonal.
