= Copallín District =

Coordinates: 5°27′07″S 78°27′02″W

Copallin
- District
- Interactive map of Copallin
- Country: Peru
- Region: Amazonas
- Province: Bagua
- Capital: Copallin

Area
  - Total: 90.19 km^{2} (34.82 sq mi)

Population (2005 census)
  - Total: 5,752
  - Density: 63.78/km^{2} (165.2/sq mi)
- Time zone: UTC-5 (PET)

Copallín is a district of the province of Bagua, Peru, located along the Amazon River.

== History ==
The district's capital, Copallín, was originally founded as Santa Magdalena de Copallín.

The first historical account regarding the current population of the district of Copallín is tied to the history of Copallín Viejo, erected in the current district of Aramango.

Don Juan Requejo Guerrero, the fourth mayor of the province of Bagua, recalls that the natives staged three consecutive attacks on the town of Copallín Viejo.

According to priest José Maria Guallart, in 1845 a group of aguarunas, including women, visited Copallín Viejo (today the Hillocks of Aramango) to trade copal, parrots, and changuitas for machetes and axes. The natives had the bad fortune of coming across a colony, the inhabitants of which devised a trap for the natives, getting them drunk before killing the men and raping the women. Eventually, the aguarunas organized themselves and launched a surprise attack on Copallín.

Since history tells the story of winners and the influential rather than losers and commoners, the natives of Copallín have been labelled as savages dedicated to butchery and looting, while the colonists are often portrayed as innocent and defenseless. Records show that in 1857, natives assaulted the ancient village of Copallín, killing its inhabitants, destroying its crops, appropriating its goods, and taking its women. The document further adds that from this period on, the whole of Copallín (its houses, temples, etc.) remained in ruins.

Those who escaped the slaughter, among them some Huatangari, continued to seek out sympathetic and hospitable populations for some time, until the inhabitants of La Peca claimed a section of land where they grouped and, in 1860, founded a village called New Copallín.

This new location proved to be a failure; on October 26, 1870, governor Pedro C. Lean and municipal receiver José Felis Molla – both authorities of La Peca – raised a flag to the national representatives (deputies), stating that the people of Copallín, La Peca, Morerilla, and Bagua Chica were in danger of disappearing at any minute after realizing that the "savages" had reappeared and threatened to pose a raid.

Desperation and fear showed in such heartbreaking pleas as, "We present ourselves ... before your paternal mercy," "We come as citizens of the Homeland begging for protection," and "Affectionate Fathers of the homeland, we beg that you do what is right."

This cry for help was published in defense of rights and endorsed on November 18, 1870, when the board established a garrison on La Peca; later the Principal Commission of War thought to endorse this project – a measure of supreme importance aimed at protecting the civilized peoples of the area.

== See also ==
- Copallín language
