= Xokó language =

Extinct indigenous language of Brazil

Xokó
- Shoko
- Native to: Brazil
- Region: Sergipe, Alagoas
- Ethnicity: Xokó
- Extinct: late 20th century
- Language family: Xokó–Natú: Xokó

Language codes
- ISO 639-3: None (mis)
- Glottolog: xoco1235
- Linguasphere: 89-CBC-aa
- Map of the Xocó language.

Xokó (Chocó, Shokó, Ceococe) is an extinct and poorly attested language of Brazil that is not known to be related to other languages. It has been classified as being related to Natú, which was spoken nearby.

It was originally spoken along the Piancó River is an area that is now a suburb of Porto Real do Colégio.

== Vocabulary ==
=== Pompeu (1958) ===
Chocó (Xocó) vocabulary collected in Colégio, Alagoas:

Portuguese gloss (original)	English gloss (translated)	Chocó
fogo	fire	atsá/tsá
água	water	taká
cachimbo	smoking pipe	pupú, masapuãba
homem	man	mãjikêô
