= Malibú language =

Extinct language of Colombia

Malibú
- Malebú
- Native to: Colombia
- Region: Magdalena Department
- Extinct: (date missing)
- Language family: Malibu languages: Malibú

Language codes
- ISO 639-3: None (mis)
- Glottolog: mali1242

Malibú (Malebú) is an extinct and poorly attested language formerly spoken in Magdalena Department in Colombia. The name "Malibú" is the word for cacique in Malibú itself. Malibú was spoken along the Magdalena River.

== Vocabulary ==
Malibú vocabulary
French gloss	English translation	Malibú
arbre manzanillo	manchineel (Hippomane mancinella)	tahana
cacique, chef espagnol	cacique, Spanish chief	malibu
canot	canoe	man
chicha	chicha	man
diable, divinité	devil, deity	ytaylaco, yteylaco, yntelas, ytaylas
espagnol	Spanish	tinchan
manioc	manioc	entaha, enbutac
nariguera d'or	golden nariguera	mayun
prêtre indigène, sorcier	Indigenous priest, sorcerer	mayhan, maihan
résine, appelée par les Espagnols cararia [scribal error for caraña], qui sert à la peinture du corps, distincte de la bija ordinaire ou roucou	resin, called by the Spanish caraña, used for body painting and distinct from Bixa orellana	napo
réunion pour boire	meeting for drinking	entai
sève du manzanillo, qui sert de poison de flèche	manchineel sap used for arrow poison	enta
