= Bagua language =

Extinct unclassified language of Peru

Bagua
- Patagón de Bagua
- Native to: Peru
- Region: Marañón River basin
- Extinct: (date missing)
- Language family: Cariban ?: (unclassified); Bagua

Language codes
- ISO 639-3: None (mis)
- Glottolog: bagu1249
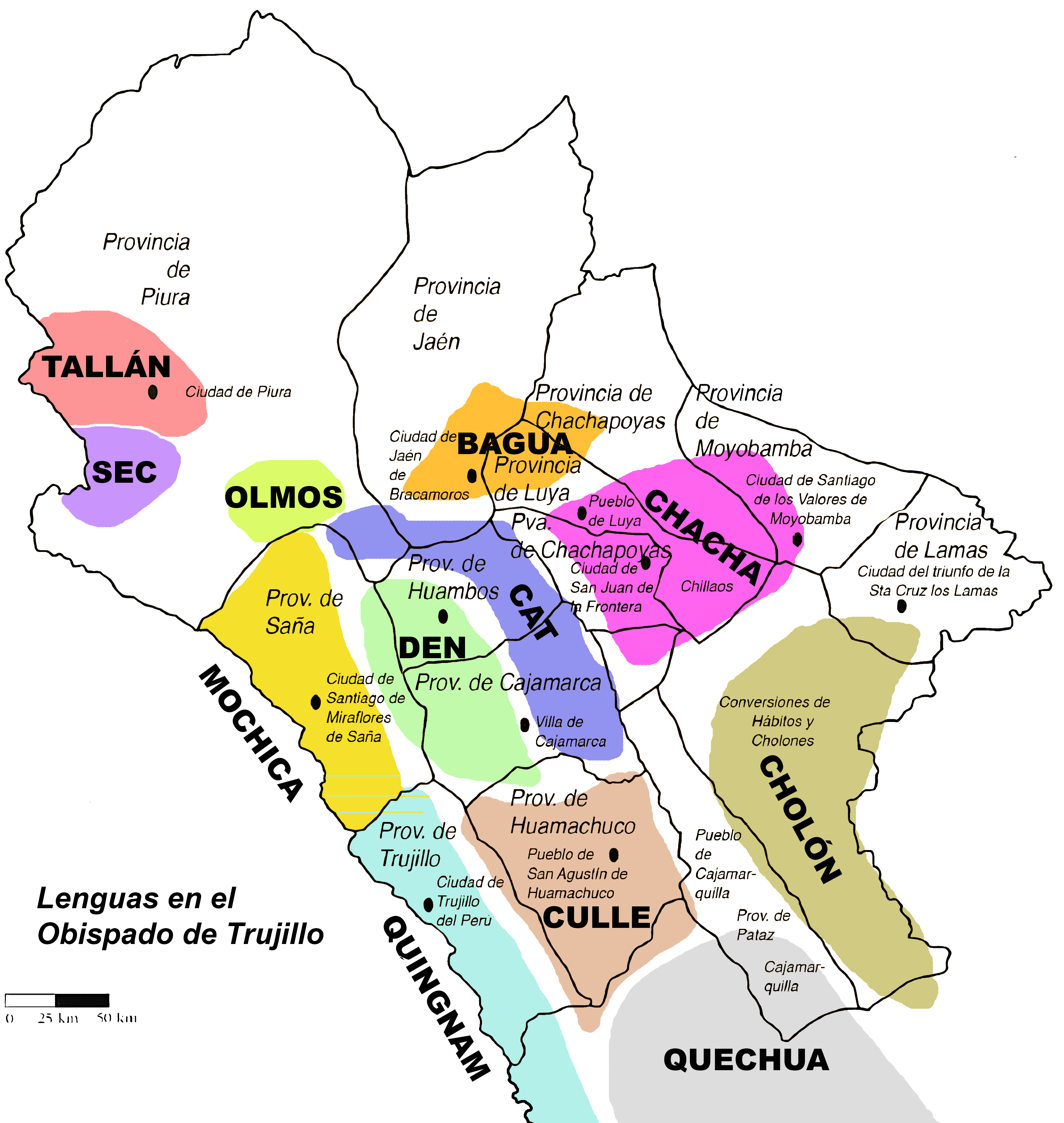
- Bagua

Bagua (Patagón de Bagua) is an extinct unclassified language, formerly spoken in the Marañón River basin in Peru. It is thought to be related to the Cariban languages, in particular the equally poorly attested Patagón.

== Vocabulary ==
Bagua is attested by three words, tuna 'water', lancho 'maize', nacxé 'come here'. Tuna 'water' suggests it may be a Cariban language, like Patagón de Perico, but is insufficient evidence for classification.
