= Lule language =

Indigenous language of northern Argentina

Lule
- Native to: Argentina
- Region: Resistencia, Chaco
- Ethnicity: Lule people
- Extinct: after 1981
- Language family: Isolate: Lule
- Dialects: Lule proper; Isistiné; Oristiné; Toquistiné

Language codes
- ISO 639-3: ule
- Glottolog: lule1238
- Map of the Lule language

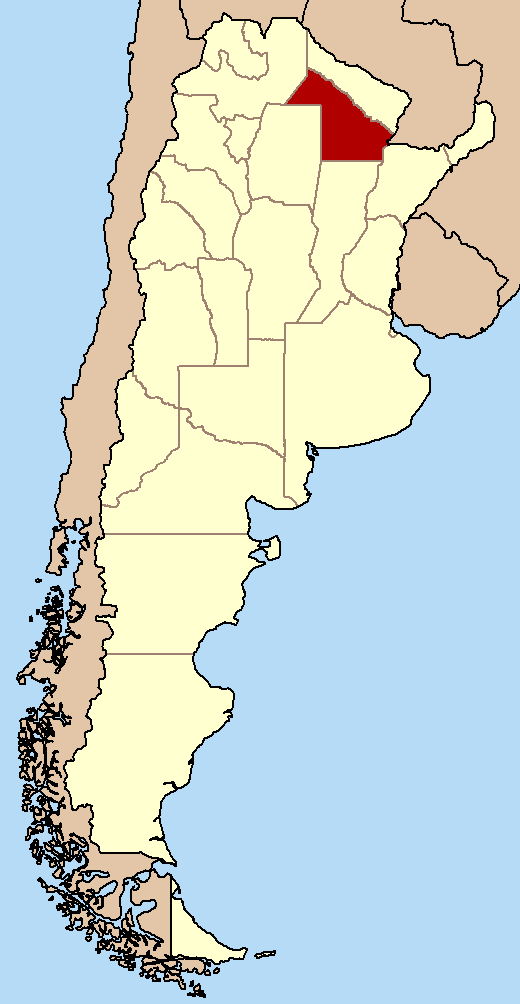
location of Chaco Province, Argentina

Lule is an indigenous language of northern Argentina, which is now extinct. Campbell (1997) writes that in 1981 there was an unconfirmed report that Lule was still spoken by 5 families in Resistencia in east-central Chaco Province. It is unclear if it is the same language as Tonocoté.

== Classification ==
Lule appears to be distantly related to the still-spoken Vilela language, together forming a small Lule–Vilela family. Kaufman (1990) finds this relationship likely and with general agreement among the major classifiers of South American languages. Viegas Barros published additional evidence 1996–2006. Zamponi (2008) and other authors consider Lule and Vilela two linguistic isolates.

There were three distinct groups known as Lulé:

- The nomadic Lule of the plains, who in addition to their own language, spoke Tonocote, the local lingua franca and the language of Spanish catechism.
- The sedentary Lule of the foothills, who were trilingual in Lule, Tonocote, and Quechua in addition to their original language, Cacán.
- The Lule-Tonocote, whose language was recorded by Machoni.

== Documentation ==
In 1586 Father Alonson Bárzana (Bárcena) wrote a grammar of Tonocote, which is now lost. In 1732 Antonio Maccioni (Machoni), who was not aware of Bárzana's grammar, wrote one of his own, Arte y vocabulario de la lengua lule y tonocoté ('Art and vocabulary of the language of the Lule and Tonocote') of the Lule-Tonocote language at the mission San Esteban de Miraflores. This is now the primary data on the language. Métraux (1946) concluded that Lule and Tonocote were distinct, and perhaps unrelated, languages, and that the Tonocote at the Miraflores mission had shifted to the Lule language by the time of Machoni.

== Phonology ==
Machoni records a language with vowels /a e i o u/ and few consonants. Final syllables are stressed. There are consonant clusters in initial and final position: quelpç [kelpt͡s] 'I split', slimst [slimst] 'I blow my nose', oalécst [waˈlekst] 'I know', stuç [stut͡s] 'I throw'. Lule has no postalveolar affricate [t͡ʃ]. In the orthography of Machoni, the symbols c, ç, and possibly also z are used to represent a sound tentatively identified as an alveolar affricate [t͡s]. However, c is used both for IPA [t͡s] and [k], evident from the imperative form of certain verbs, such as uec-y [wet͡sˈi] 'die!' from uec-ç [wet͡st͡s] 'I die' versus poqu-y [pokˈi] 'dig!' from poc-ç [pokt͡s] 'I dig'. Machoni also adds that in certain words it is pronounced as Spanish ç or ss.

The simplicity of the Lule phoneme inventory is unusual compared to that of its relative Vilela, which has postvelar stops, as well as voicing and glottalization distinctions. Machoni may not have recorded such distinctions in his transcriptions. Glottalization in Lule is only suggested by the double consonants in ttá 'egg'. Voiceless laterals are evidenced in Machoni's accompanying vocabulary, such as quilhá [kiˈɬa] 'Indian girl'; cf. Vilela kiɬe 'woman' and also possibly a voiceless nasal as seen in nhalá pulú 'sugarcane'. Glottal stops are suggested by seç ~ s.heç [sʔet͡s] 'I support', in which s and e are pronounced separately, and seç [set͡s] 'I cry', where they are pronounced without separation.

== Works ==
Editions of Arte, y vocabulario de la lengua lule, y tonocote:

- Machoni, Antonio (1732). Arte, y vocabulario de la lengua lule, y tonocote,. John Carter Brown Library. En Madrid : por los herederos de Juan Garcia Infanzon.
- Machoni, Antonio (1877). Arte y vocabulario de la lengua lule y tonocoté. John Carter Brown Library. [Buenos Aires] : En Madrid por los herederos de Juan Garcia Infanzon año de 1732 - Reimpreso en Buenos Aires por Pablo E. Coni, Calle Potosi, 60.

== Bibliography ==
- Campbell, Lyle (1997). American Indian languages: the historical linguistics of native America. Oxford studies in anthropological linguistics. New York Oxford: Oxford university press. ISBN 978-0-19-509427-5.
- Kaufman, Terrence (1990). "Language history in South America: What we know and how to know more". In Payne, Doris L. (ed.). Amazonian linguistics: studies in lowland South American languages. Texas linguistics series. Working conference on Amazonian languages. Austin (Tex.): University of Texas press. ISBN 978-0-292-70414-5.
- Kaufman, Terrence (1994), "The native languages of South America", in Moseley, Christopher; Asher, R. E.; Tait, Mary (eds.), Atlas of the world's languages, London: Routledge, ISBN 978-0-415-01925-5
- Zamponi, Raoul. (2008). Sulla fonologia e la rappresentazione ortografica del lule. In A. Maccioni, Arte y Vocabulario de la lengua Lule y Tonocoté. (pp. xxi–lviii). Ed. by R. Badini, T. Deonette & S. Pineider. Cagliari: Centro di Studi Filologici Sardi. ISBN 978-88-8467-474-6.
