= Pacatuba, Sergipe =

Municipality in Sergipe, Brazil

Coordinates: 10°27′10″S 36°39′03″W

- Municipality
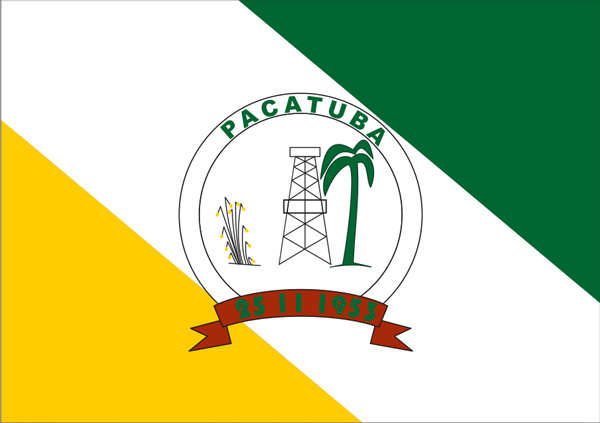
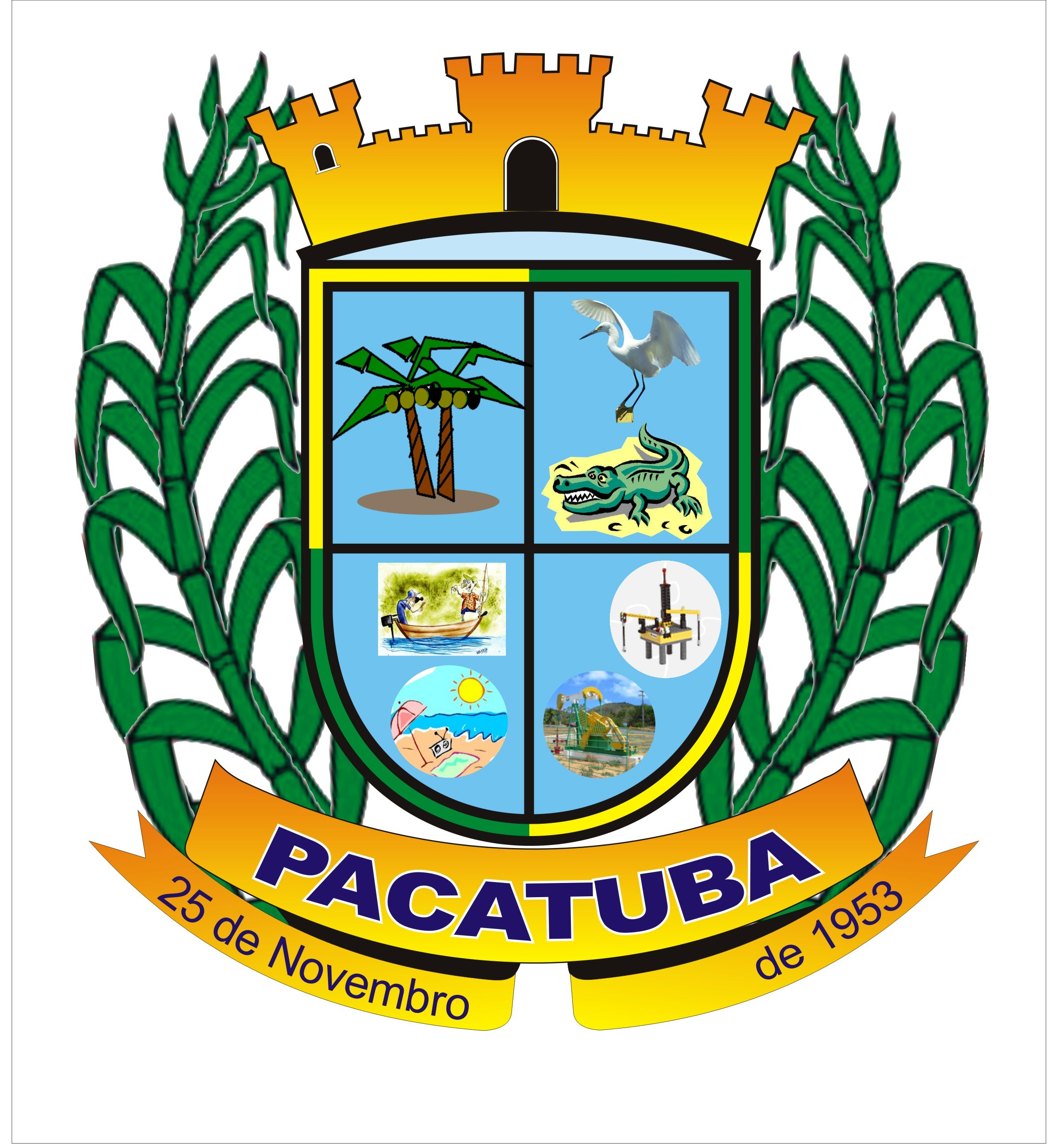
- Flag Coat of arms
- Interactive map of Pacatuba, Sergipe
- Country: Brazil
- Time zone: UTC−3 (BRT)

Pacatuba (Central northeastern Portuguese pronunciation: [pɐkɐˈtubɐ]) is a municipality located in the Brazilian state of Sergipe. Its population was 14,540 (2020) and its area is 364 km^{2} (141 sq mi).

The municipality contains part of the 5,547 hectares (13,710 acres) Santa Isabel Biological Reserve, a strictly protected conservation unit created in 1988.

== See also ==
- List of municipalities in Sergipe
- Natú people
