= Natú language =

Extinct language of eastern Brazil

Natú
- Peagaxinan
- Native to: Brazil
- Region: Alagoas
- Ethnicity: Natú people
- Extinct: late 20th century
- Language family: Xokó–Natú: Natú

Language codes
- ISO 639-3: None (mis)
- Glottolog: natu1248
- Linguasphere: 89-EAA-aa
- Map of the Natú language

Natú (a.k.a. Peagaxinan) is an extinct language of eastern Brazil. It was originally spoken on the Ipanema River in the Cariri area near present-day Porto Real do Colégio by the Natú people. It is so poorly attested that "only Greenberg dares to classify [it]". It has, however, been classified in a linguistic family with neighboring Xocó.

== Vocabulary ==
=== Loukotka (1963) ===
| French gloss (original) | English gloss (translated) | Šokó [Natú] |
|---|---|---|
| arc | bow | sabue |
| chien | dog | bašiú |
| dent | tooth | tuľuso |
| eau | water | krananan |
| étoile | star | inkó |
| femme | woman | áspikiá |
| feu | fire | atika |
| flèche | arrow | ikrō |
| grand | large | akómá |
| hache | ax | ikrā |
| homme | man | pikuá |
| langue | tongue | avēľa |
| lune | moon | kra-uáve |
| main | hand | krasiá |
| maison | house | gandiľá |
| œil | eye | tuľusō |
| petit | small | kinefá |
| pied | foot | vēsirē |
| soleil | sun | kra-šulo |
| tabac | tobacco | bazí |
| terre | earth | atisere |
| tête | head | tipia |

=== Pompeu Sobrinho (1958) ===
The following vocabulary of Natu as spoken by Natu caboclos in Porto Real do Colégio, Alagoas was recorded by Carlos Estevão in 1940.

| Portuguese gloss (original) | English gloss (translated) | Natu |
|---|---|---|
| estréla | star | iroinkó |
| fogo | fire | shakishá |
| água | water | kraunã |
| Rio São Francisco | São Francisco River | Opára |
| cachimbo | smoking pipe | katuká |
| cachimbo cerimonial | ceremonial pipe | kuzipé |
| maracá | maraca | shishiá |
| dinheiro | money | meré |
| mulher | woman | pikwá |
| gente estranha | strangers | zitók, kôbê |
| boi | ox | krazó |
| ovelha | sheep | sêprun |
| jacaré | alligator | gozê |
| jaboti | red-footed tortoise or yellow-footed tortoise | kati |
| mandioca | manioc | grogó |
| feijão | bean | ma/tsaká |
| tabaco, fumo | tobacco, smoke | bazé |
