= Wasu language =

Extinct unclassified language of Brazil

Wasu
- (unattested)
- Native to: Brazil
- Region: Alagoas
- Ethnicity: 1,447 Wassu (1999)
- Extinct: (date missing)
- Language family: unclassifiable

Language codes
- ISO 639-3: wsu
- Glottolog: wasu1238

Wasu (Waçu, Wassú) is an extinct and unattested, presumed language of the Serra do Azul in Joaquim Gomes, Alagoas, Brazil. The ethnic population is about 1,500.
