= Wakoná language =

Extinct language of eastern Brazil

Wakoná
- Aconã
- Native to: Brazil
- Region: Alagoas
- Ethnicity: 500-1,000 Aconã (1995)
- Extinct: mid-1970s
- Language family: unclassified

Language codes
- ISO 639-3: waf
- Glottolog: wako1235

Wakoná (Aconã) is an extinct language of eastern Brazil, formerly spoken by the Aconã people. The Aconã are one of the ethnic components of the Xukuru-Kariri people. The dispersed ethnic population numbered an estimated 500 to 1,000 in 1995.

== Geographical distribution ==
Wakoná was originally spoken around Lagoa Comprida and in Penedo. Loukotka (1968) reported that the remaining ethnic descendants who speak only Portuguese could be found in the city of Porto Real do Colégio. They lived near Palmeira dos Índios according to Meader (1978).

== Vocabulary ==
=== Meader (1978) ===
Five Xukuru-Kariri word lists collected by Menno Kroeker in Alagoas in 1961 are published in Meader (1978).

Words recorded from an elderly male pajé (shaman) in Porto Real do Colégio:

Portuguese gloss (original)	English gloss (translated)	Xukuru-Kariri
chuva	rain	sèhóɩdzˈɛ̀ʔà
fumo	smoke	bˈázè
lua	moon	kˈriũavi
mandioca	manioc	gˈrïgɔ
menino	boy	semˈentiais
mulher	woman	spˈikwais
rio	river	oːpˈara
sol	sun	kràšùtˈó
terra	earth	aːtsɩhˈi
vento	wind	mə̀núsˈi
batata	potato	dˈódsákà
cachimbo	smoking pipe	catʔokə
Colégio (cidade)	Colégio (city)	simidˈo
deus	God	sõsˈeh
dinheiro	money	mɛrɛkiˈa
farinha	flour	tˈónà
feijão	bean	nˈódsákà
gado	cattle	krˈazɔ
galinha	chicken	cáːkìʔ
luz	light	kápˈòèr
ovelha	sheep	sábˈòèR
peru	turkey	brɛfˈɛlia
porco	pig	korˈe
soldado	soldier	òlˈófò

Words recorded from Alfredo Caboquim, a pajé (shaman), and his brother Miguel Caboquim in Fazenda Conta, Palmeira dos Índios, Alagoas:

Portuguese gloss (original)	English gloss (translated)	Xukuru-Kariri
carne de boi	beef	ˈbeiñõ
chuva	rain	šualya
dê-me fogo para o cigarro	Give me fire for the cigarette.	àòšˈínòʔ ìnˈísìà sˈèdàià
lua / moça	moon / girl	seːya
mãe	mother	isá
milho	corn	matˈilya
não (mentira)	no (lie)	eːyo
nariz	nose	nˈəmbi
pai	dad	étfˈɛ̀
anzol	fish hook	èáyˈɔ̀ / alyɔ (?)
batata	potato	dˈotsakə
bebida de mandioca	manioc drink	gúlížˈɔ̀ (gálížˈɔ̀)
bode	goat	filˈisakə
boi	ox	léfétˈìa
cachorro	dog	it(ə)lˈo
cachorro de brinquedo	toy dog	ìt(ə)lˈó tə̀núnšweˈì
dança indígena	indigenous dance	áʔálˈèndà
deus	God	àʔúdéódályˈà
estrangeiro	foreigner, stranger	kóbˈè
farinha	flour	tititsia
feijão	bean	nˈatsakə
folga dos índios	indigenous holiday	arikulilyˈa / kèːšátíkáˈya (?)
fumando cachimbo	to smoke a pipe	puèpùˈa
galinha	chicken	sˈetˈáduàlyà
gato	cat	atašeškia
índia	indigenous woman	sétsˈòníká
lagarto	lizard	šˈua atˈežo / tˈeyu (?)
mulato	mulatto	mulatι̃nkya
negro	black person	tùpíə̃̀nkyà
padre	father	ĩŋklaˈišoa
(pausa) – considerando as palavras	pause (when thinking of words)	ə̃hə̃
peru	turkey	aotˈisakə
porco	pig	àːlˈé
praia (?)	beach (?)	práiˈà
quarto de homem	men's quarters	subεbˈe
como vai?	How are you?	àkàkˈáumà
vou bem, obrigado	I am fine, thank you.	íkàkˈə́
senhor	sir	ˈĩŋklai
vamos embora	Let's go.	òːšˈóuà
homem mais velho	older man	tošˈa / aošιnə̃ŋklainšoa taškiˈa

Words recorded from an elderly farmer in Fazenda Conta, Palmeira dos Índios, Alagoas:

Portuguese gloss (original)	English gloss (translated)	Xukuru-Kariri
água	water	oiyˈa
carne de boi	beef	aòtˈísiə̀
fogo	fire	tóˈè
aguardente	aguardente	kóšákˈà
bode	goat	sákúlˈɛ̀, sákúlˈègò
bonito	beautiful	atilišˈĩ
brancos	white people	ə̃́nkláʔˈì
cabelo crespo (de negro)	curly hair (of black people)	tuʔˈĩ
café	coffee	tópˈì
cigarro	cigarette	àlísíˈàx
índio	indigenous man / person	sɛ́tsˈò
mãe de Jesus	mother of Jesus (Virgin Mary)	kwə́ntópˈə̃̀ atoayˈə
negra	black man	(i)atuayˈa
negro	black woman	túpíyˈà
porco	pig	šíə̃̀ntì
tatu	armadillo	rṍmpˈə̀tì

Words recorded from João Candido da Silva, a young farmer in Fazenda Conta, Palmeira dos Índios, Alagoas. Silva was not Indigenous himself but his wife was a Xukuru cabocla.

Portuguese gloss (original)	English gloss (translated)	Xukuru-Kariri
fumo	smoke	šíšúˈà
dança	dance	arikurˈi
deus	God	dédùˈá / íŋklàˈíx / sɛtisoadažui

Words recorded from José Fermino da Silva of Palmeira dos Índios, Alagoas:

Portuguese gloss (original)	English gloss (translated)	Xukuru-Kariri
água	water	óiyˈàh
fogo para o cigarro	fire for cigarette	tòˈéh asendendisi / tòˈéh pàrə̀nsˈíáx
batata	potato	dˈótsákà
branco	white person	kràiʔˈé
caboclo	caboclo	sǽtsˈùx
cachimbo	smoking pipe	pua / pue
deus	God	dèdˈúa
feijão	bean	nˈótsákà
negra	black	kòbˈéh
obrigado	thank you	bèréˈɔ́
pau (claraíba)	claraíba tree	frˈéžɔ̀ìž
pau (d'arco)	Tabebuia tree	paìpˈɛ́
