= Maynas language =

Extinct Cahuapanan language of Peru

Maynas
- Rimachu
- Native to: Peru
- Ethnicity: Maynas
- Extinct: (date missing)
- Language family: Cahuapanan: Shawi–Maynas; Maynas

Language codes
- ISO 639-3: None (mis)
- Glottolog: jesu1239

Maynas (Mayna, Maina), also known as Rimachu, is an extinct Cahuapanan language of Peru. Its linguistic affiliation has been debated over, including links to Chicham, Zaparoan, and Candoshi-Shapra.

== Geograhpical distribution ==
According to Čestmír Loukotka (1968), it was once spoken between the Nucuray River, Chambira River, and Pastaza River. Some of the sources on Maynas report that it was spoken along the Marañón River, from its tributary the Morona River to near the Chambira River.

== History ==
The Mayna people numbered 3,500 in 1620, but only 15 years later there were no more than 2000 of them left, indicating a severe demographic decline around that time.

== Classification ==
Several sources have listed it as a dialect of, or a language related to, Omurano, which also goes by the name Mayna, but Hammarström (2011) showed that they are separate languages. Attempts have been made to link Maynas with the Chicham, Cahuapanan, Zaparoan, and Candoshi languages, but they have not yet been conclusive.

Taylor and Descola (1981) argue for the inclusion of the Maynas into the Chicham (Jivaroan) linguistic family based on ethnographic similarities; for example, their rituals using trophy heads, though these cultural elements were also shared by non-Chicham-speaking groups in the geographic area.

According to Luis Miguel Rojas-Berscia, the group referred to as Maynas spoke two different languages; Northern Maynas could be related to Candoshi. Maynas territory was said to begin at the Pongo de Manseriche, so named because of the parrots living there. The Candoshi word for 'parrot' is mantsiirchi. Similarly, the Maynas were reported to call God Yñerre, attributed by Rojas-Berscia to the Murato (a Candoshi dialect) word [aˈɲeiɾe] 'mother'. Southern Maynas, on the other hand, clearly belongs to the Kawapanan group. A source mentions the "Indians of Santiago, Nieva and the jurisdiction of Xaen" and a deity known as Cumbanama (cf. Kumpanam), who is the primary god of the Cahuapanan-speaking peoples. This southern language is attested in a translation of the Lord's Prayer.

== Sample text ==
Below is the Lord's Prayer in Maynas as written in Emilio Teza's Saggi inediti di lingue americane, with corresponding reconstruction and glosses given by Rojas-Berscia (2015).

Papa-mpoa inapa-que yau-ranso
Papa-npua’ inapa-ke ya’we-r-an-su’
father-1P.PL heaven-LOC live-IND-2-NMLZ
'Our father, you live in heaven'

quema apurinen mucharinso-ni
kema apuri-ne-n mucha-r-in-su-ni
2P name-ALIEN-2P revere-IND-3-NMLZ-ERG?
'be your name revered'

Quema inapà queyauei
Kema inapa keya-we-i
2P heaven give-1P-PL
'give us your heaven'

mompupe inapa-que napu-pitinati isse-que-nta
mumpuye inapa-ke napupintinati i-se-ke-nta
like? heaven-LOC {in the same way} that-DCT-LOC-ADIT
'in heaven as well as in the earth'

nani {taveri rosa} cussaru-mpoa ipura quetu-que
na’ni taweri-ru’sa’ kusharu-npua’ ipure ketu-ke’
every day-PL food-1.PL now give-2P.IMP
'Give us now our food of every day'

mompupe ca-mpoa-nta aloyotupe soya-pita anisere
mompupe ka-mpua-nta aluyu-tu-wei? saya-pita anise-we’
like 1P-P.INCL-ADIT shove?-IMP-1P.PL? that-PL cut-1.PL.EXCL
'in the same way we forgive the ones that would offend us; '

ca-mpoa-nta co apuquesoe tentacion-que cu anota-queve
ka-mpua-nta ku apu.ke-su tentacion--ke ku anota-ka-wei
1-PL.INCL-ADIT NEG leave-2.IMP-NMLZ temptation-LOC NEG fall-PSEUD-1.PL.EXCL
'do not let us fall in temptation,'

ina-quera co {loyave-pita quera} campu atee-que. Amen
Ina-k-e-ra ku loya-we-pita-k-e-ra ka-mpu atee-ke {}
that-OBL-LOC-ABL NEG good-NEG-PL-OBL-LOC-ABL 1P-PL.INCL free?-2.IMP {}
'and free us from the evil ones.'
