= Tonocoté language =

Extinct and unclassified language of Argentina

Tonocoté
- Native to: Argentina
- Region: Santiago del Estero Province, Tucumán Province
- Ethnicity: Tonocoté
- Era: attested 1599
- Language family: unclassified

Language codes
- ISO 639-3: None (mis)
- Glottolog: tono1235

Tonocoté is an extinct Indigenous language formerly spoken in Argentina by the Tonocoté people. It has been historically associated with the Lule language. It is very poorly attested, known only from one three-word phrase, which is completely different from its equivalents in Lule and other languages of the region.

== History ==
In 1586 Father Alonso de Bárzana (Bárcena) wrote a grammar of Tonocoté, which is now lost. The earliest colonial sources maintain that Tonocoté and Lule were distinct languages. However, the 1732 Lule grammar written by Antonio Machoni titled Arte y vocabulario de la lengua lule y tonocoté also includes "Tonocoté" in the title. As a result, the genetic affiliation of Tonocoté has been hotly debated by several authors. Various hypotheses for its affiliation include relationships with Cacán, Guarani, or even Mataguayan. The most common of these has been a link with the Lule language.

== Sample phrase ==
One three-word phrase glossed as 'God regards you' translated into six different Indigenous languages of western South America contains the only known attestation of Tonocoté, being Tius cahas paneh. The only analyzable word is Tius, clearly having a Spanish origin. The constructed equivalents in Lule are Dios ve ep or Dios ve avalacsp, which is "obviously" very different. The sentence in Tonocoté does not match any other language of northeastern Argentina and the southern Gran Chaco either. Therefore, Lule and Tonocoté were evidently different languages, perhaps only connected by their geographical proximity.
