= Porto Real do Colégio =

Municipality in Alagoas, Brazil

Porto Real do Colégio Xukuru-Kariri: simidˈo
- Municipality
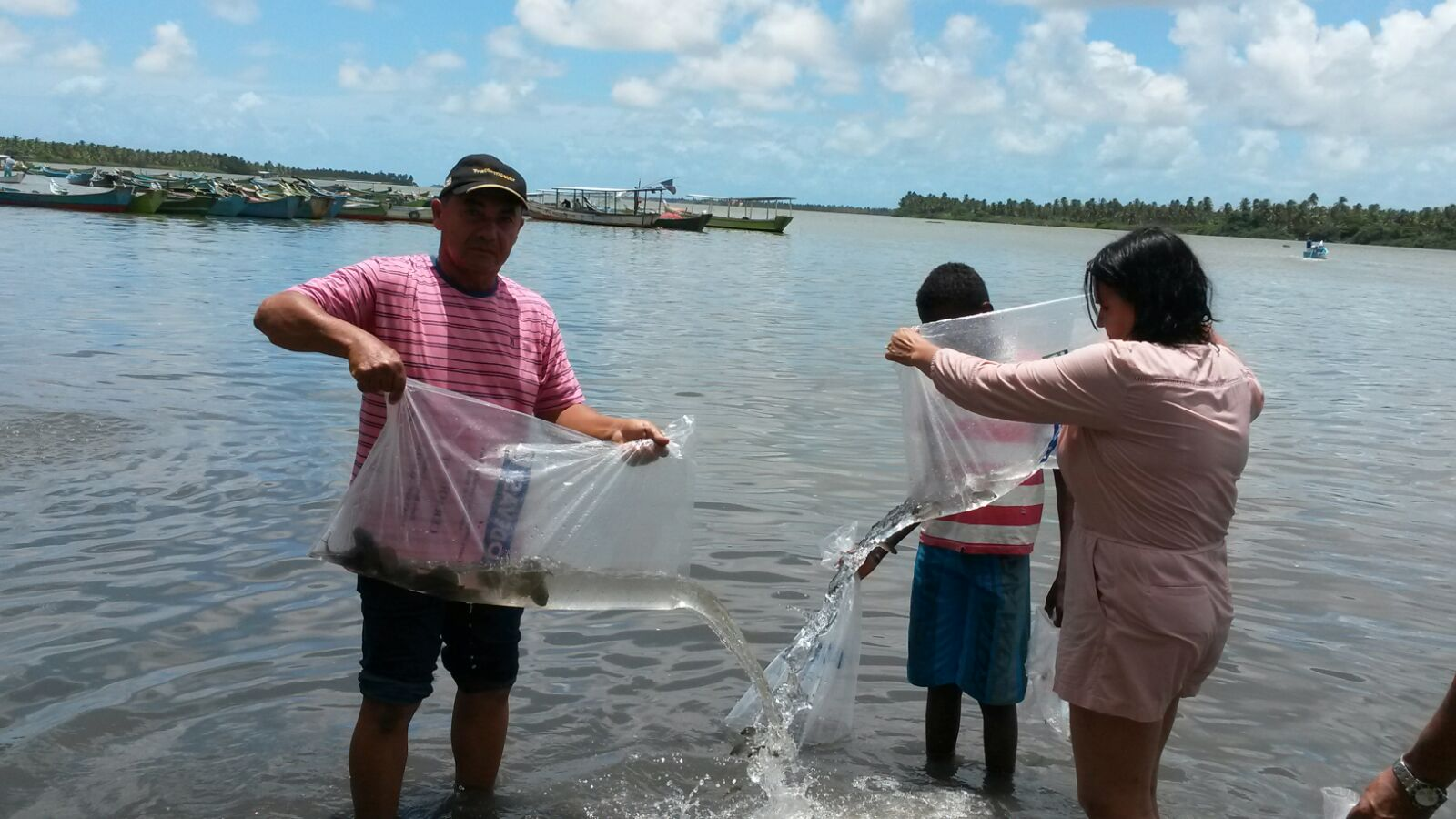

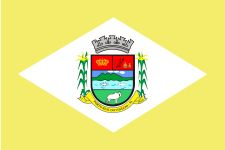
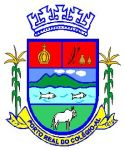
- Flag Coat of arms

- Location within Brazil
- Coordinates: 10°11′09″S 36°50′24″W
- Country: Brazil
- State: Alagoas
- Mesoregion: Leste Alagoano
- Microregion: Penedo

Government
  - Mayor: Maria Rita Bonfim Evangelista

Area
  - Total: 240.310 km^{2} (92.784 sq mi)
- Elevation: 17 m (56 ft)

Population (2020.)
  - Total: 20,112
  - Density: 83.692/km^{2} (216.76/sq mi)
- Demonym: Colegienses
- Time zone: UTC−3 (BRT)

Porto Real do Colégio (Central northeastern portuguese pronunciation: [ˈpoʁtu ʁɛˈɐw ˈdʊ kɔˈlɛʒu]) is a municipality located in the Brazilian state of Alagoas.

== Former indigenous languages ==
The unclassified extinct Wakoná language was formerly spoken in Penedo. Loukotka (1968) reported that the remaining ethnic descendants who speak only Portuguese could be found in the city of Porto Real do Colégio. The Xocó language and Natú language, both language isolates, were also spoken near present-day Porto Real do Colégio. Today, all Indigenous peoples there speak either Portuguese or Dzubukuá.
