= Patagón language (Peru) =

Extinct language of Peru

Patagón
- Patagón de Perico
- Native to: Peru
- Region: Marañón River basin
- Extinct: (date missing)
- Language family: Cariban: Guianan; Taranoan; Patagón

Language codes
- ISO 639-3: None (mis)
- Glottolog: pata1255

Patagón (Patagón de Perico, not to be confused with the Chonan languages of Tierra del Fuego and Patagonia) is an extinct language formerly spoken in the Marañón River basin in Peru. It is known from only four words.

== Vocabulary ==
Four words are recorded, tuná 'water', anás 'maize', viue 'firewood', coará 'sheep' (evidently the word for 'sloth'). These suggest that Patagón was one of the Cariban languages, particularly close to Carijona, and therefore, like the Jivaroan (Chicham) language Aguaruna, from the Amazon.

=== Comparison ===
A comparison of the four words above with Carijona equivalents is given below.

gloss	Patagón	Carijona
water	tuná	tuna 'river'
maize	anás	anádʒi
sheep [sloth]	coará	uarékore 'sloth'
firewood	viue	wewé

== See also ==
- Extinct languages of the Marañón River basin
