= Filippo Salvatore Gilij =

Italian Jesuit priest

Filippo Salvatore Gilij (Spanish: Felipe Salvador Gilij) (1721–1789) was an Italian Jesuit priest who lived in the Province of Venezuela (in present day central Venezuela) on the Orinoco River. Gilii is a highly celebrated figure in early South American linguistics due to his advanced insights into the nature of languages. Gilii was born in Legogne, Italy (Umbria region). Most of what is known about the ethnology of the Indigenous Tamanaku people of Venezuela was recorded by Gilii. One of his most notable works was Saggio di Storia Americana, o sia Storia Naturale, Civile, e Sacra De regni, e delle provincie Spagnuole di Terra-ferma nell' America meridionale, first published in four volumes in 1768. A commemorative stamp showing him was issued in 1998 by the Venezuelan government.

== Linguistic contributions ==
Gilii recognized sound correspondences (e.g. between /s/ : /tʃ/ : /ʃ/ in the Cariban family) and predated philologist William Jones' third discourse suggesting genealogical relationships between languages. Unlike Jones, Gilii presented evidence in support of his hypothesis. For example, he proposed the Maipurean (Arawakan) language family in 1783, three years before William Jones famously conceived of the Indo-European language family.

He also discussed major concepts of linguistics such as areal features between unrelated languages, loanwords (among American languages and from American languages into European languages), word order, language death, language origins, and nursery forms of child language (i.e. Lallwörter) discussed by Roman Jakobson.

Gilii’s work included the identification of nine “mother languages” (lenguas matrices) spoken in the Orinoco area. His classification was one of the earliest proposals of South American language families and provided a framework for future linguistic studies in the region.

=== Major works ===
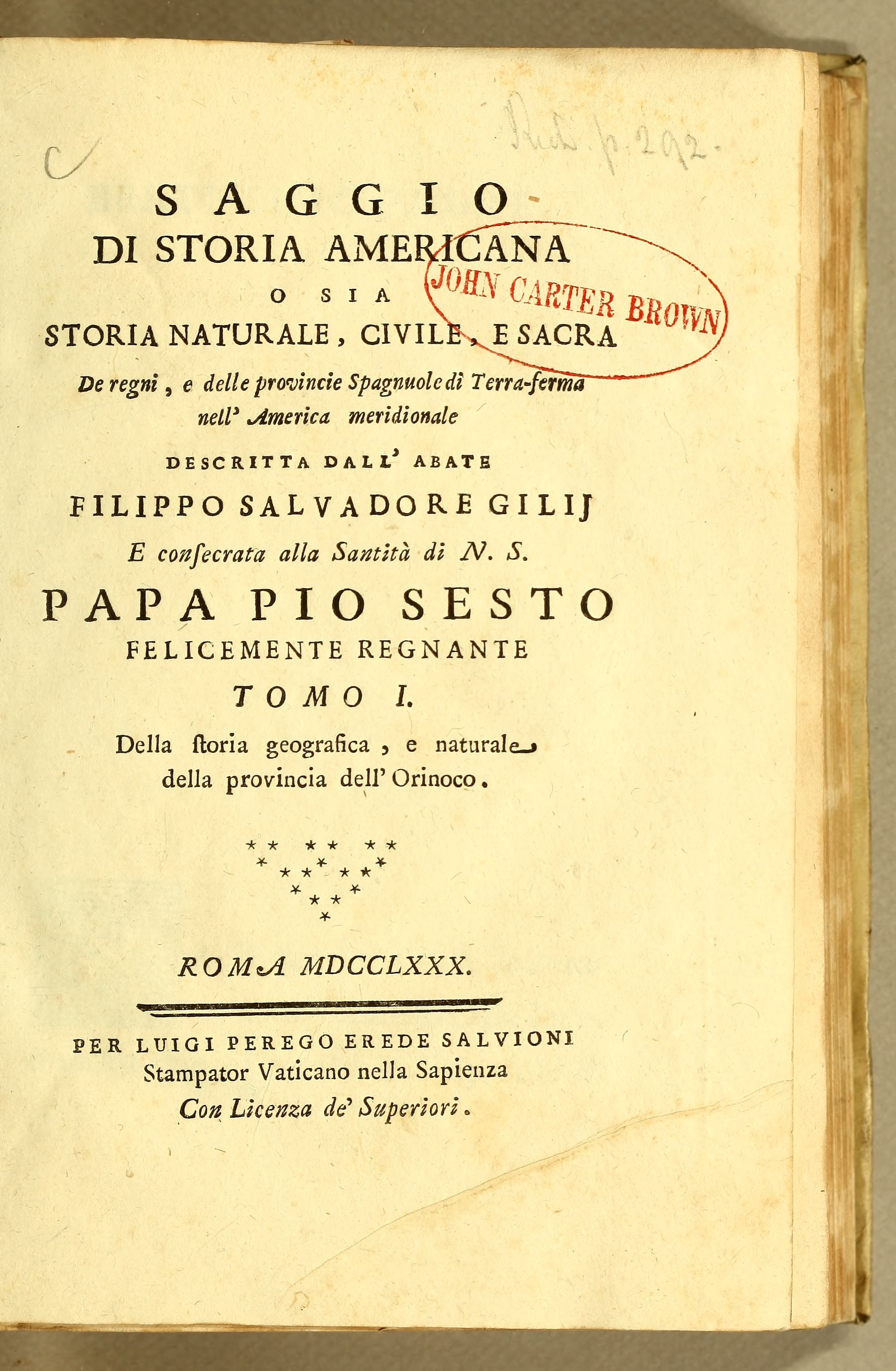
Title page of Saggio di storia americana (Rome, 1780).

Gilii’s most notable work is Saggio di Storia Americana, o sia Storia Naturale, Civile, e Sacra De regni, e delle provincie Spagnuole di Terra-ferma nell’ America meridionale, published in four volumes in 1780. This comprehensive work covered various aspects of the natural, civil, and sacred history of the Spanish provinces in mainland South America. In this work, Gilii discussed major concepts of linguistics such as areal features between unrelated languages, loanwords, word order, language death, language origins, and nursery forms of child language. His discussions on these topics were ahead of his time and laid the groundwork for future linguistic research.

=== Gilii's nine lenguas matrices ===
Gilii found that the languages spoken in the Orinoco area belonged to nine "mother languages", language families:

1. Caribe (Cariban)
2. Sáliva (Salivan)
3. Maipure (Maipurean)
4. Otomaca & Taparíta (Otomacoan)
5. Guama & Quaquáro (Guamo)
6. Guahiba (Guajiboan)
7. Yaruro
8. Guaraúno (Warao)
9. Aruáco (Arhuacan)

== Legacy ==
In 1998, the Venezuelan government issued a commemorative stamp in his honor.

== See also ==
- Classification of indigenous languages of the Americas
- Lorenzo Hervás y Panduro

== Bibliography ==
- Campbell, Lyle. (1997). American Indian Languages: The Historical Linguistics of Native America. New York: Oxford University Press. ISBN 0-19-509427-1.
- Del Rey Fajardo, José. (1971). Aportes jesuíticos a la filología colonial venezolana (Vols. 1-2). Caracas: Universidad Católica Andrés Bello, Instituto de Investigaciones Históricas, Seminario de Lenguas Indígenas.
- Denevan, William M. (1968). "Review of Ensayo de historia americana by Felipe Salvador Gilij & El Orinoco ilustrado y defendido by P. Jose Gumilla," The Hispanic American Historical Review, 48 (2), 288-290.
- Gilij, Filippo S. (1780–1784). Sagio di storia americana; o sia, storia naturale, civile e sacra de regni, e delle provincie spagnuole di Terra-Ferma nell' America Meridionale descritto dall' abate F. S. Gilij (Vols. 1-4). Rome: Perigio. (Republished as Gilij 1965).
- Gilij, Filippo S. (1965). Ensayo de historia americana. Tovar, Antonio (Trans.). Fuentes para la historia colonial de Venezuela (Vols. 71-73). Caracas: Biblioteca de la Academia Nacional de la Historia.
- Gray, E.; & Fiering, N. (Eds.). (2000). The Language Encounter in the Americas, 1492-1800: A Collection of Essays. New York: Berghahn Books.
