= Avane language =

Extinct Arawakan language of Venezuela

Avane
- Baniwa, Abane
- Native to: Venezuela
- Region: Colombian border
- Extinct: late 18th century
- Language family: Arawakan: Northern; Upper Amazonian; Orinoco; Yavitero languages; Avane
- Dialects: Quirruba; Baniva-Avani

Language codes
- ISO 639-3: bvv
- Glottolog: bani1254

Avane (Abane), one of several languages called Baniwa, also known as Baniva Yavitero, was an Arawakan language of Venezuela. It is believed to have become extinct around the late 18th century, and is only attested in a short word-list from that time.

== History ==
It was primarily spoken in the Amazonas region of Venezuela and along the Colombian border, and had dialects called Quirruba and Baniva-Avani.

The language likely began deteriorating with the arrival of the Jesuits in the late 18th century.

The Avane language included a colloquial name to refer to the neighboring indigenous Maipure people, Metimetichini, which may be humorously alluding to the polysyllabic nature of many Maipure words and contains two sounds not usually found in Avane. The language also shares some words with others in the same family, including Maipure and Guipunave, but is clearly phonetically distinct.

== Phonology ==
Avane is characterized phonetically in comparison to Maipure, showing some large differences. Avane uses the dental stop [d], which is not seen in Maipure but is native to Yavitero and Baniva. It uses the glottal fricative [h] ([x]) before [i] and/or [a], where Maipure would use [t], [k], and [j]. Also unlike Maipure, the Avane diphthongs [ai] and [au] do not appear to be contracted in stressed syllables. Ethnographer Filippo Gilij described the Avane pronunciation as "rude, guttural" compared to the Maipure's "gentle, beautiful" version.

== Morphology ==
In morphology, Avane is seen as close to Maipure, with both using the "empty morph" suffix "-cà" for certain active and mainly intransitive verbs.

== Vocabulary ==
Attested Avane words
Avane	Gloss
javaxì	axe
pussi	manioc bread
casimeje	a dance
Diòsu	God
ada	grater
tamàu	he went
nuxa	I
nuxacàu	I go
nujutuà	I smoke
quaxixì (quajijì)	jaguar
Metimetichinì	Maipure
napài	my father
unè	skin disease
Purrùnaminàri	supreme being
yema	tobacco
inioxì	woman
saje, ja	yes
