= Akkadian language =

Extinct Semitic language of Mesopotamia

Akkadian
- Babylonian, Assyrian
- 𒀝𒅗𒁺𒌑(𒌝); Akkadû(m)
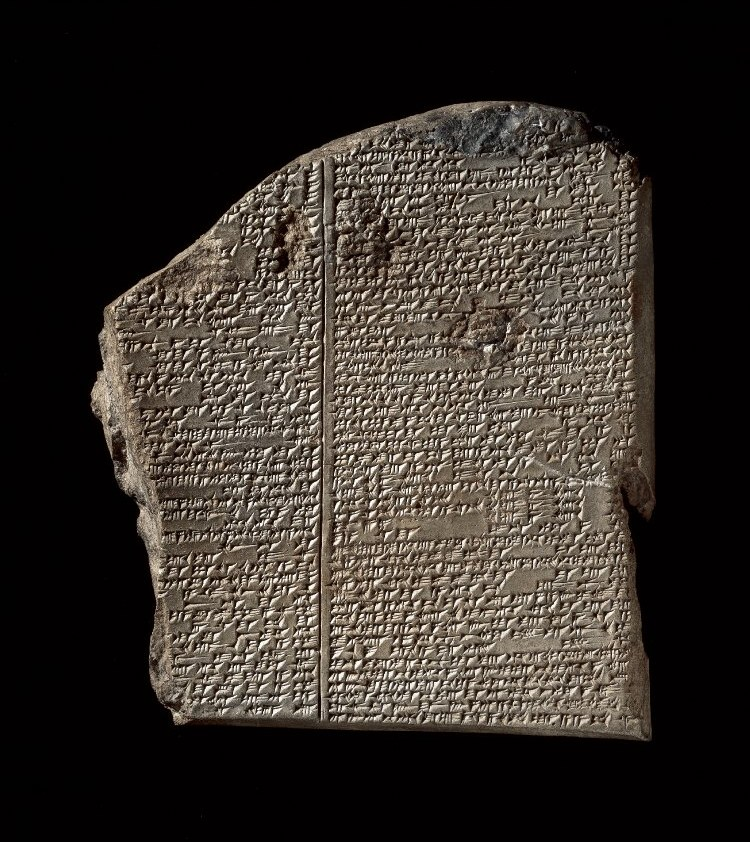
- The Deluge tablet of the Gilgamesh epic in Akkadian
- Region: Mesopotamia
- Era: c. 2600–500 BC; academic or liturgical use until AD 100
- Language family: Afro-Asiatic: Semitic; East; Akkadian
- Dialects: Old Akkadian; Assyrian; Babylonian; Canaano-Akkadian
- Writing system: Sumero-Akkadian cuneiform

Official status
- Official language in: Initially Akkad (central Mesopotamia); lingua franca of the Middle East and Egypt in the late Bronze and early Iron Ages

Language codes
- ISO 639-2: akk
- ISO 639-3: akk
- Glottolog: akka1240

Akkadian (/əˈkeɪdiən/ ə-KAY-dee-ən; Akkadian: 𒀝𒅗𒁺𒌑(𒌝), romanized: Akkadû(m)) is an East Semitic language that is attested in ancient Mesopotamia (Akkad, Assyria, Isin, Larsa, Babylonia) from the mid-third millennium BC until its gradual replacement in common use by Old Aramaic among Mesopotamians by the 8th century BC.

Akkadian, which is the earliest documented Semitic language, is named after the city of Akkad, a major centre of Mesopotamian civilization during the Akkadian Empire (c. 2334–2154 BC). It was written using the cuneiform script, originally used for Sumerian, but also used to write multiple languages in the region including Eblaite, Hurrian, Elamite, Old Persian and Hittite. The influence of Sumerian on Akkadian went beyond just the cuneiform script; owing to their close proximity, a lengthy span of contact and the prestige held by the former, Sumerian significantly influenced Akkadian phonology, vocabulary and syntax. This mutual influence of Akkadian and Sumerian has also led scholars to describe the languages as a sprachbund.

Akkadian proper names are first attested in Sumerian texts in the mid-3rd millennium BC, and inscriptions ostensibly written in Sumerian but whose character order reveals that they were intended to be read in East Semitic (presumably early Akkadian) date back to as early as c. 2600 BC. From about the 24th century BC, texts fully written in Akkadian begin to appear. By the 20th century BC, two variant forms of the same language were in use in Assyria and Babylonia, known as Assyrian and Babylonian respectively. The bulk of preserved material is from this later period, corresponding to the Near Eastern Iron Age. In total, hundreds of thousands of texts and text fragments have been excavated, covering a vast textual tradition of religious and mythological narrative, legal texts, scientific works, personal correspondence, political, civil and military events, economic tracts and many other examples.

Centuries after the fall of the Akkadian Empire, Akkadian, in its Assyrian and Babylonian varieties, was the native language of the Mesopotamian empires (Old Assyrian Empire, Babylonia, Middle Assyrian Empire) throughout the later Bronze Age, and became the lingua franca of much of the Ancient Near East by the time of the Bronze Age collapse c. 1150 BC. However, its decline began in the Iron Age, during the Neo-Assyrian Empire, by about the 8th century BC (Tiglath-Pileser III), in favour of Old Aramaic. By the Hellenistic period, the language was largely confined to scholars and priests working in temples in Assyria and Babylonia. The last known Akkadian cuneiform document dates from the 1st century AD. Mandaic and Suret are two (Northwest Semitic) Neo-Aramaic languages that retain some Akkadian vocabulary and grammatical features.

Akkadian is a fusional language with grammatical case. Like all Semitic languages, Akkadian uses the system of consonantal roots. The Kültepe texts, which were written in Old Assyrian, include Hittite loanwords and names, which constitute the oldest record of any Indo-European language.

== Classification ==
Sumero-Akkadian cuneiform syllabary
(c. 2200 BC)
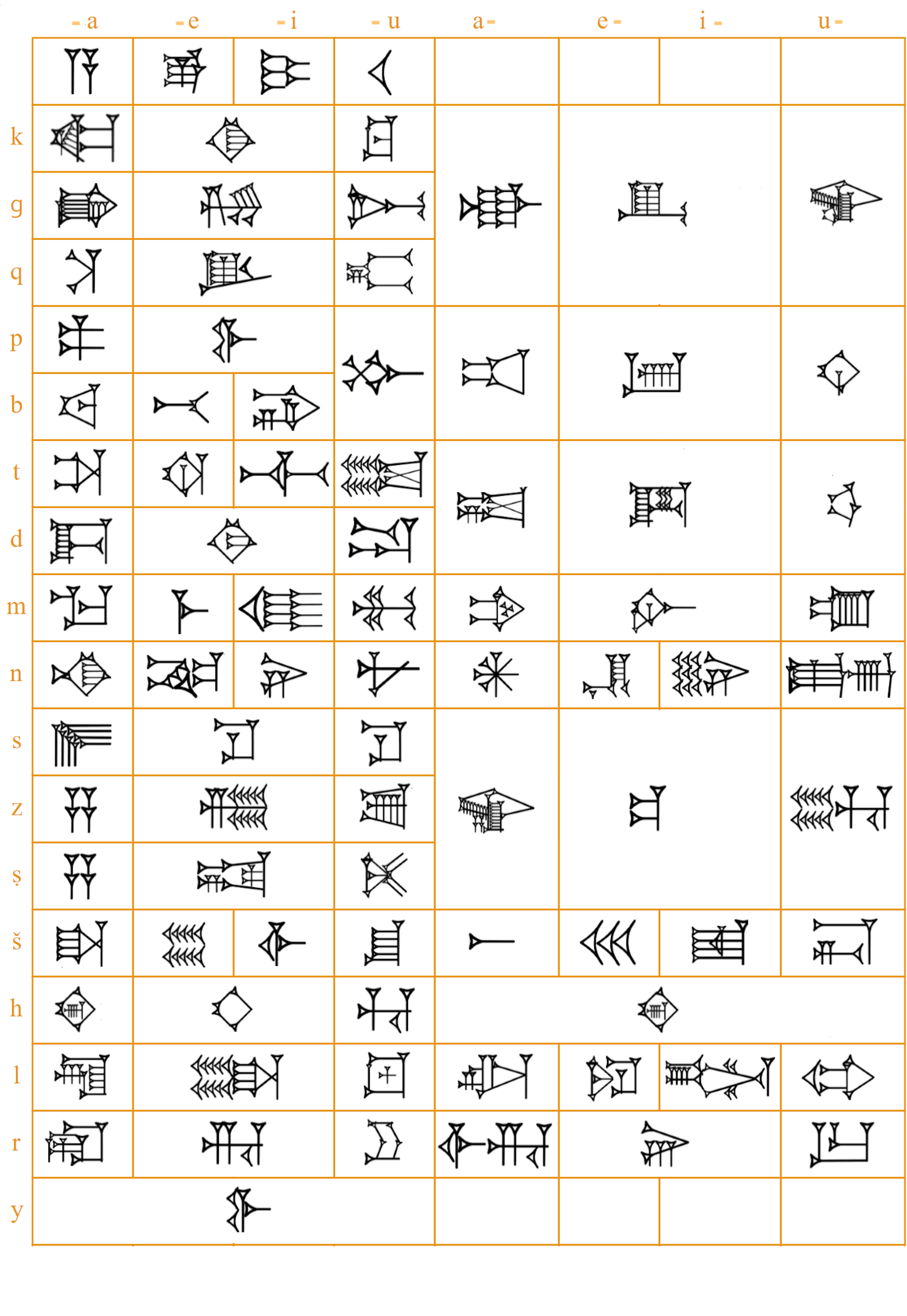
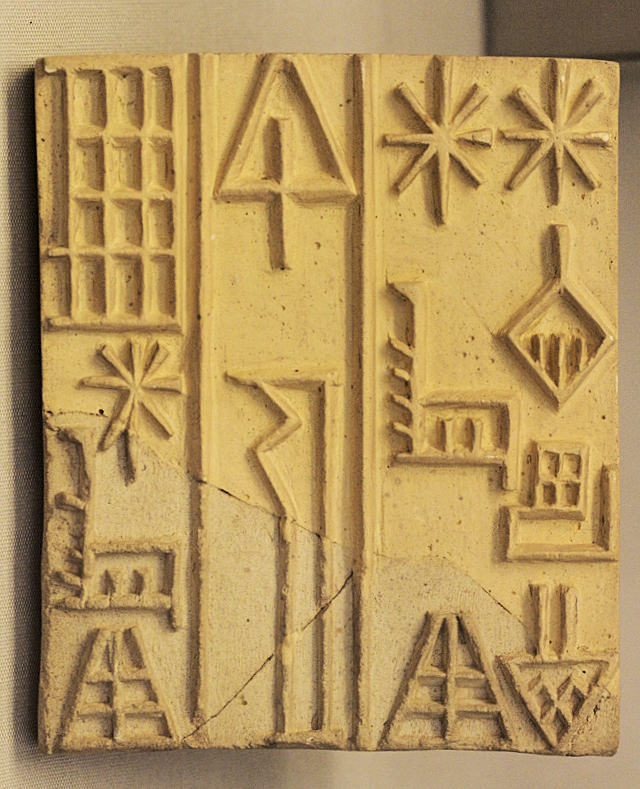
Left: Sumero-Akkadian cuneiform syllabary, used by early Akkadian rulers. Right: Seal of Akkadian Empire ruler Naram-Sin (reversed for readability), c. 2250 BC. The name of Naram-Sin (Old Akkadian: 𒀭𒈾𒊏𒄠𒀭𒂗𒍪, romanized: ^{D}Na-ra-am ^{D}Sîn, Sîn being written Old Akkadian: 𒂗𒍪, romanized: EN.ZU), appears vertically in the right column. British Museum.

Akkadian is a Semitic language of the East Semitic branch. Its relatives in the East Semitic branch include Eblaite. This group differs from the Northwest Semitic languages (such as Aramaic) and South Semitic languages (such as Geʽez) in its subject–object–verb word order, while the other Semitic languages usually have either a verb–subject–object or subject–verb–object order.

In contrast to most other Semitic languages, Akkadian has only one non-sibilant fricative: ḫ [x]. Akkadian lost both the glottal and pharyngeal fricatives, which are characteristic of the other Semitic languages. Until the Old Babylonian period, the Akkadian sibilants were exclusively affricated.

Additionally Akkadian is the only Semitic language to use the prepositions ina and ana (locative case, English in/on/with, and dative-locative case, for/to, respectively). Other Semitic languages like Arabic, Hebrew and Aramaic have the prepositions bi/bə and li/lə (locative and dative, respectively). The origin of the Akkadian spatial prepositions is unknown.

The Semitic languages are further grouped by most linguists into the Afroasiatic macrofamily of languages, meaning that Akkadian is distantly related to Ancient Egyptian, as well as many other languages spoken historically and currently across northern and western Africa and West Asia.

== History and writing ==
=== Writing ===
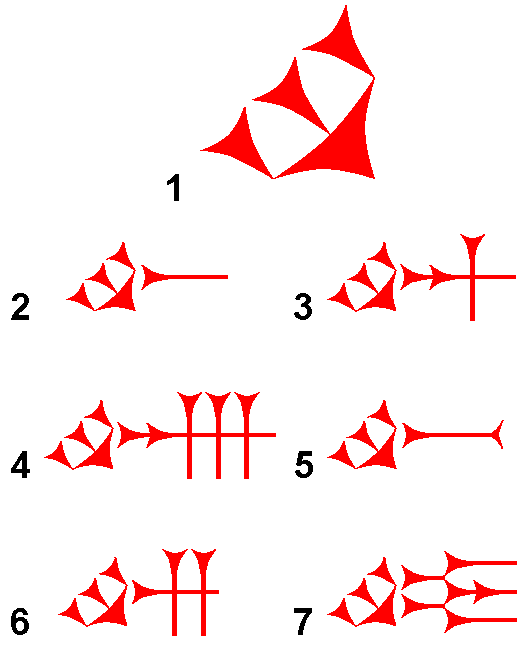
Cuneiform writing (Neo-Assyrian script) (1 = Logogram (LG) "mix"/syllabogram (SG) ḫi, 2 = LG "moat", 3 = SG aʾ, 4 = SG aḫ, eḫ, iḫ, uḫ, 5 = SG kam, 6 = SG im, 7 = SG bir)

Old Akkadian is preserved on clay tablets dating back to c. 2500 BC. It was written using cuneiform, a script adopted from the Sumerians using wedge-shaped symbols pressed in wet clay. As employed by Akkadian scribes, the adapted cuneiform script could represent either (a) Sumerian logograms (i.e., picture-based characters representing entire words), (b) Sumerian syllables, (c) Akkadian syllables, or (d) phonetic complements. In Akkadian the script practically became a fully fledged syllabic script, and the original logographic nature of cuneiform became secondary, though logograms for frequent words such as 'god' and 'temple' continued to be used. For this reason, the sign AN can on the one hand be a logogram for the word ilum ('god') and on the other signify the god Anu or even the syllable -an-. Additionally, this sign was used as a determinative for divine names.

Another peculiarity of Akkadian cuneiform is that many signs do not have a well defined phonetic value. Certain signs, such as AḪ, do not distinguish between the different vowel qualities. Nor is there any coordination in the other direction; the syllable -ša-, for example, is rendered by the sign ŠA, but also by the sign NĪĜ. Both of these are often used for the same syllable in the same text.

Cuneiform was in many ways unsuited to Akkadian: among its flaws was its inability to represent important phonemes in Semitic, including a glottal stop, pharyngeals, and emphatic consonants. In addition, cuneiform was a syllabary writing system—i.e., a consonant plus vowel comprised one writing unit—frequently inappropriate for a Semitic language made up of triconsonantal roots (i.e., three consonants plus any vowels).

=== Development ===
Akkadian is divided into several varieties based on geography and historical period:

- Old Akkadian, 2500–1950 BC
- Old Babylonian and Old Assyrian, 1950–1530 BC
- Middle Babylonian and Middle Assyrian, 1530–1000 BC
- Neo-Babylonian and Neo-Assyrian, 1000–600 BC
- Late Babylonian, 600 BC – 100 AD

One of the earliest known Akkadian inscriptions was found on a bowl at Ur, addressed to the very early pre-Sargonic king Meskiagnunna of Ur (c. 2485–2450 BC) by his queen Gan-saman, who is thought to have been from Akkad. The Akkadian Empire, established by Sargon of Akkad, introduced the Akkadian language (the "language of Akkad") as a written language, adapting Sumerian cuneiform orthography for the purpose. During the Middle Bronze Age (Old Assyrian and Old Babylonian period), the language virtually displaced Sumerian, which is assumed to have been extinct as a living language by the 18th century BC.

Old Akkadian, which was used until the end of the 3rd millennium BC, differed from both Babylonian and Assyrian, and was displaced by these dialects. By the 21st century BC Babylonian and Assyrian, which were to become the primary dialects, were easily distinguishable. Old Babylonian, along with the closely related dialect Mariotic, is clearly more innovative than the Old Assyrian dialect and the more distantly related Eblaite language. For this reason, forms like lu-prus ('I will decide') were first encountered in Old Babylonian instead of the older la-prus.

While generally more archaic, Assyrian developed certain innovations as well, such as the "Assyrian vowel harmony". Eblaite was even more so, retaining a productive dual and a relative pronoun declined in case, number and gender. Both of these had already disappeared in Old Akkadian. Over 20,000 cuneiform tablets in Old Assyrian have been recovered from the Kültepe site in Anatolia. Most of the archaeological evidence is typical of Anatolia rather than of Assyria, but the use both of cuneiform and the dialect is the best indication of Assyrian presence.

Old Babylonian was the language of king Hammurabi and his code, which is one of the oldest collections of laws in the world. (see Code of Ur-Nammu.) Old Assyrian developed as well during the second millennium BC, but because it was a purely popular language—kings wrote in Babylonian—few long texts are preserved. It was, however, notably used in the correspondence of Assyrian traders in Anatolia in the 20th–18th centuries BC and that even led to its temporary adoption as a diplomatic language by various local Anatolian polities during that time.

The Middle Babylonian period started in the 16th century BC. The division is marked by the Kassite invasion of Babylonia around 1550 BC. The Kassites, who reigned for 300 years, gave up their own language in favor of Akkadian, but they had little influence on the language. At its apogee, Middle Babylonian was the written language of diplomacy of the entire Ancient Near East, including Egypt (Amarna Period). During this period, a large number of loan words were included in the language from Northwest Semitic languages and Hurrian. However, the use of these words was confined to the fringes of the Akkadian-speaking territory.

From 1500 BC onwards, the Assyrian language is termed Middle Assyrian. It was the language of the Middle Assyrian Empire. However, the Babylonian cultural influence was strong and the Assyrians wrote royal inscriptions, religious and most scholarly texts in Middle Babylonian, whereas Middle Assyrian was used mostly in letters and administrative documents.

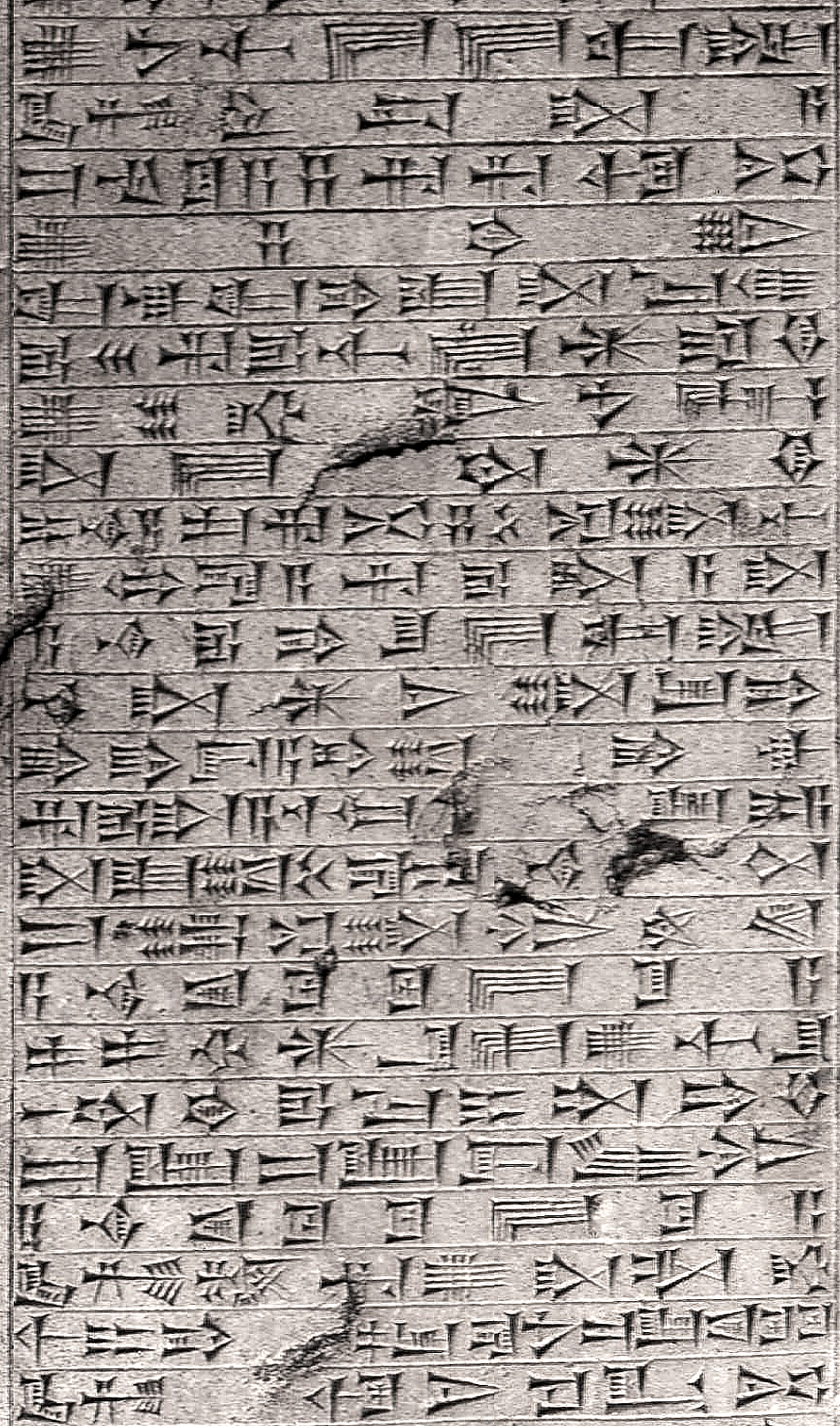
A Neo-Babylonian inscription of Nebuchadnezzar II

During the first millennium BC, Akkadian progressively lost its status as a lingua franca. In the beginning, from around 1000 BC, Akkadian and Aramaic were of equal status, as can be seen in the number of copied texts: clay tablets were written in Akkadian, while scribes writing on papyrus and leather used Aramaic. From this period on, one speaks of Neo-Babylonian and Neo-Assyrian.

Neo-Assyrian experienced an upswing in popularity in the 10th century BC when the Assyrian kingdom became a major power with the Neo-Assyrian Empire. During the existence of that empire, however, Neo-Assyrian began to turn into a chancellery language, being marginalized by Old Aramaic. The dominance of the Neo-Assyrian Empire under Tiglath-Pileser III over Aram-Damascus in the middle of the 8th century led to the establishment of Aramaic as a lingua franca of the empire, rather than it being eclipsed by Akkadian. Texts written 'exclusively' in Neo-Assyrian disappear within 10 years of Nineveh's destruction in 612 BC. Under the Achaemenids, Aramaic continued to prosper, but Assyrian continued its decline. The language's final demise came about during the Hellenistic period when it was further marginalized by Koine Greek, even though Neo-Assyrian cuneiform remained in use in literary tradition well into Parthian times.

Neo-Assyrian was used in some surviving tablets containing poetry and also more prominently in surviving letters of royal correspondence. Because of the multilingual nature of the empire, many loan words are attested as entering the Assyrian language during the Neo-Assyrian period. The number of surviving documents written in cuneiform grew considerably fewer in the late reign of Ashurbanipal, which suggests that the language was declining since it is probably attributable to an increased use of Aramaic, often written on perishable materials like leather scrolls or papyrus. The Neo-Assyrian Akkadian language did not disappear completely until around the end of the 6th century BC however, well into the subsequent post-imperial period.

Similarly, the Persian conquest of the Mesopotamian kingdoms contributed to the decline of Babylonian, from that point on known as Late Babylonian, as a popular language. However, the language was still used in its written form. Even after the Greek invasion under Alexander the Great in the 4th century BC, Akkadian was still a contender as a written language, but spoken Akkadian was likely extinct by this time, or at least rarely used. The last positively identified Akkadian text comes from the 1st century AD. The latest known text in cuneiform Babylonian is an astronomical almanac dated to 79/80 AD. However, the latest cuneiform texts are almost entirely written in Sumerian logograms. Iamblichus, a 2nd century Syrian novelist, may have been one of the last known people to know Babylonian.

=== Decipherment ===
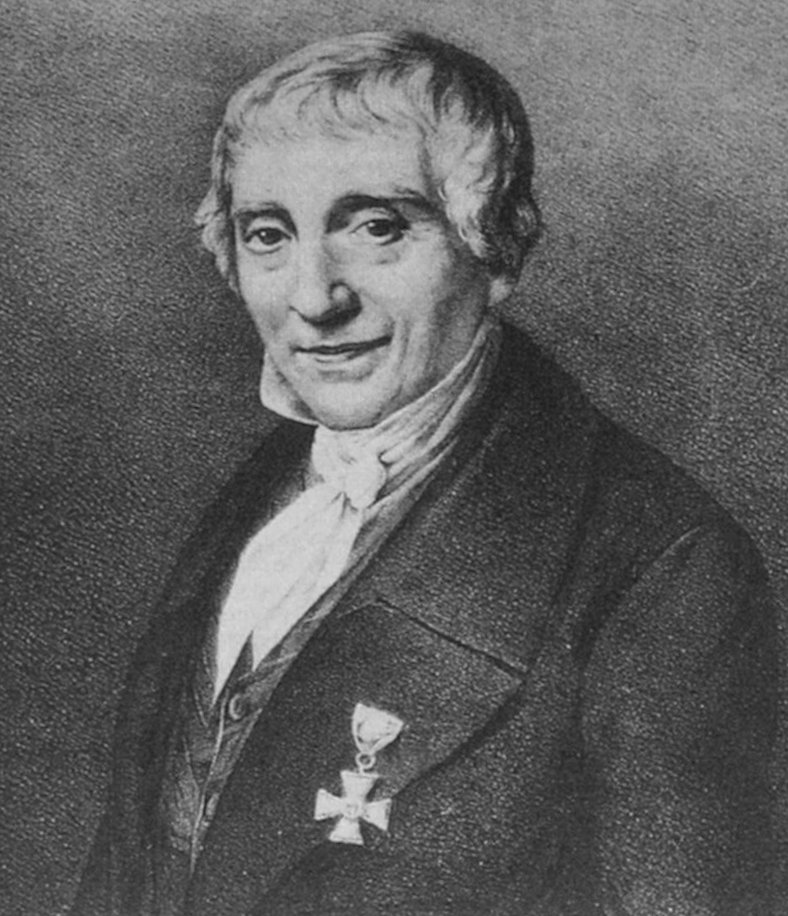
Georg Friedrich Grotefend

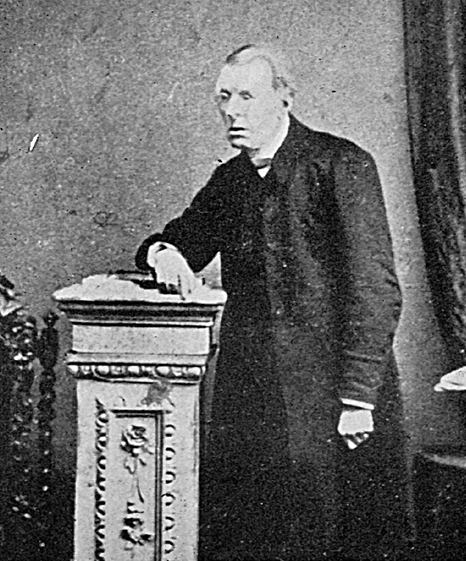
Edward Hincks

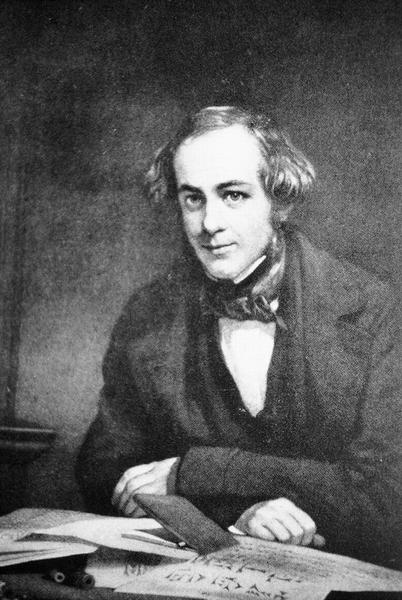
Sir Henry Rawlinson

The Akkadian language began to be rediscovered when Carsten Niebuhr in 1767 was able to make extensive copies of cuneiform texts and published them in Denmark. The deciphering of the texts started immediately, and bilinguals, in particular Old Persian-Akkadian bilinguals, were of great help. Since the texts contained several royal names, isolated signs could be identified, and were presented in 1802 by Georg Friedrich Grotefend. By this time it was already evident that Akkadian was a Semitic language, and the final breakthrough in deciphering the language came from Edward Hincks, Henry Rawlinson and Jules Oppert in the middle of the 19th century.

In the early 21st century it was shown that automatic high-quality translation of Akkadian can be achieved using natural language processing methods such as convolutional neural networks.

=== Dialects ===
The following table summarises the dialects of Akkadian identified with certainty so far.

Known Akkadian dialects
Dialect	Location
Assyrian	Northern Mesopotamia
Babylonian	Central and Southern Mesopotamia
Mariotic	Central Euphrates (in and around the city of Mari)
Nuzi	Northern Tigris (in and around the city of Nuzi)
Tell Beydar	Northern Syria (in and around Tell Beydar)

Some researchers (such as W. Sommerfeld 2003) believe that the Old Akkadian variant used in the older texts is not an ancestor of the later Assyrian and Babylonian dialects, but rather a separate dialect that was replaced by these two dialects and which died out early.

Eblaite, formerly thought of as yet another Akkadian dialect, is now generally considered a separate East Semitic language.

== Phonology ==
Because Akkadian as a spoken language is extinct and no contemporary descriptions of the pronunciation are known, little can be said with certainty about the phonetics and phonology of Akkadian. Some conclusions can be made, however, due to the relationship to the other Semitic languages and variant spellings of Akkadian words.

=== Consonants ===
The following table presents the consonants of the Akkadian language, as distinguished in Akkadian cuneiform. The reconstructed phonetic value of a phoneme is given in IPA transcription, alongside its standard (DMG-Umschrift) transliteration in angle brackets ⟨ ⟩.

		Labial	Alveolar		Palatal	Velar	Uvular/ Glottal
		Labial	plain	sibilant	Palatal	Velar	Uvular/ Glottal
Nasal		m ⟨m⟩	n ⟨n⟩				
Plosive/ Affricate	tenuis	p ⟨p⟩	t ⟨t⟩	t͡s ⟨s⟩		k ⟨k⟩	ʔ ⟨ʾ⟩
Plosive/ Affricate	emphatic		t’ ⟨ṭ⟩	t͡s’ ⟨ṣ⟩		k’ ⟨q⟩	ʔ ⟨ʾ⟩
Plosive/ Affricate	voiced	b ⟨b⟩	d ⟨d⟩	d͡z ⟨z⟩		ɡ ⟨g⟩	ʔ ⟨ʾ⟩
Fricative				s ⟨š⟩	ʃ ⟨š⟩	x ⟨ḫ⟩	(ʁ) ⟨r⟩
Approximant			l ⟨l⟩		j ⟨y⟩	w ⟨w⟩	
Trill			r ⟨r⟩				

- Borrowings from and to Sumerian have been interpreted as indicating that Akkadian voiceless non-emphatic plosives were originally tenuis /p t k/, but became aspirated /pʰ tʰ kʰ/ around 2000 BCE.
- Akkadian ⟨r⟩ is usually interpreted as an alveolar trill [r], but some authors reconstruct it as a voiced fricative [ʁ].
- ⟨š⟩ represented /s/ in the Assyrian dialect and /ʃ/ in the Babylonian dialect. Alternatively transcribed as ⟨s̱⟩.
- /kʼ s x j/ are alternatively transcribed as ⟨ḳ⟩ ⟨s̱⟩ ⟨x, ġ, h⟩ ⟨j⟩ respectively.

==== Reconstruction ====
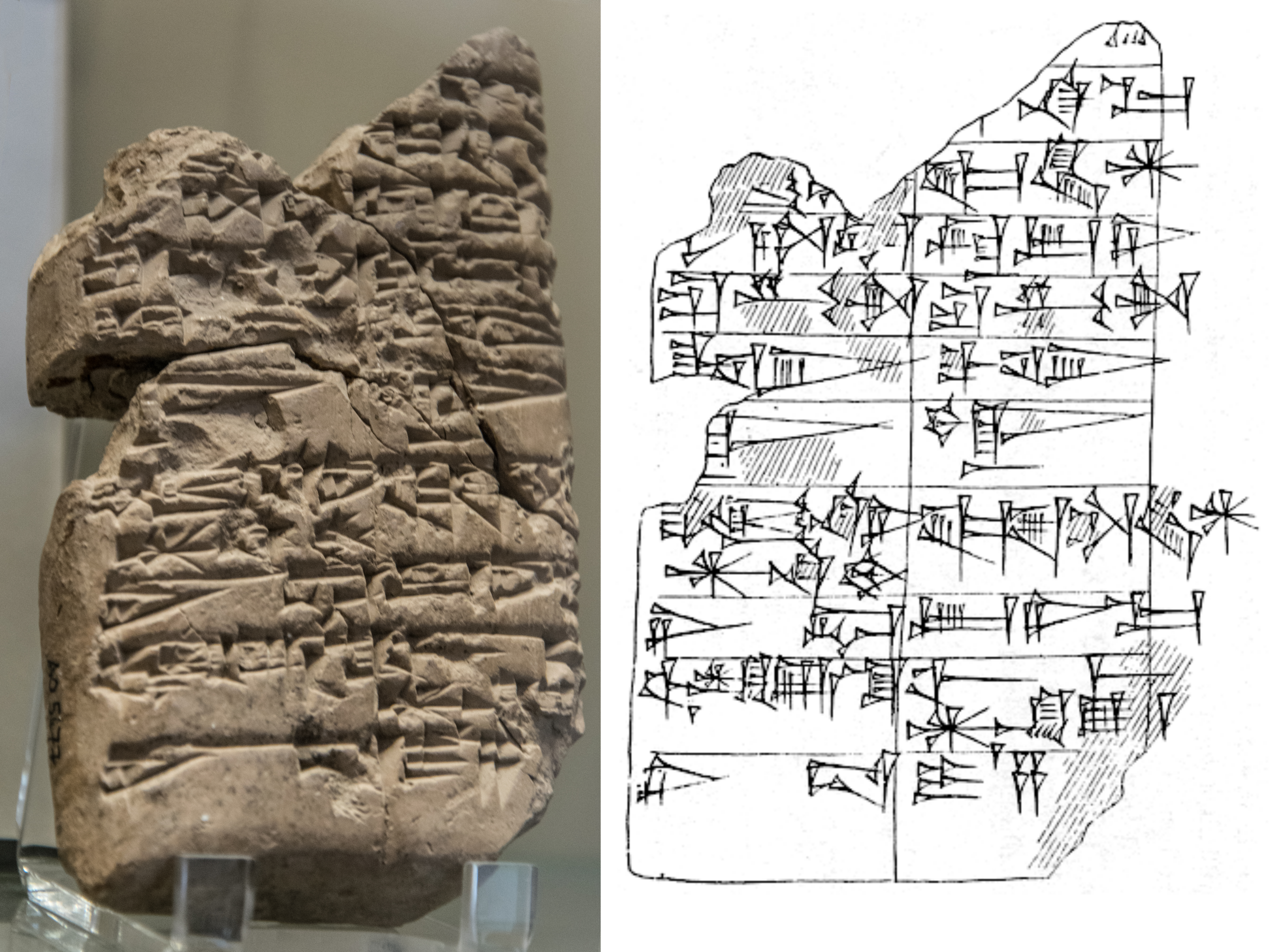
The first known Sumerian-Akkadian bilingual tablet dates from the reign of Rimush. Louvre Museum AO 5477. The top column is in Sumerian; the bottom column is its translation in Akkadian.

Akkadian emphatic consonants are typically reconstructed as ejectives, which are thought to be the oldest realization of emphatics across the Semitic languages. One piece of evidence for this is that Akkadian shows a development known as Geers's law, where one of two emphatic consonants dissimilates to the corresponding non-emphatic consonant. For the sibilants, traditionally ⟨š⟩ has been held to be postalveolar /ʃ/, and ⟨s⟩, ⟨z⟩, ⟨ṣ⟩ analyzed as fricatives; but attested assimilations in Akkadian suggest otherwise. For example, when the possessive suffix -šu is added to the root awat ('word'), it is written awassu ('his word') even though šš would be expected.

The most straightforward interpretation of this shift from tš to ss, is that ⟨s, ṣ⟩ form a pair of voiceless alveolar affricates /t͡s/ /t͡sʼ/, ⟨š⟩ is a voiceless alveolar sibilant /s/, and ⟨z⟩ is a voiced alveolar affricate or fricative /d͡z/~/z/. The assimilation is then [awat+su] > /awatt͡su/. In this vein, an alternative transcription of ⟨š⟩ is ⟨s̱⟩, with the macron below indicating a soft (lenis) articulation in Semitic transcription. Other interpretations are possible. /ʃ/ could have been assimilated to the preceding /t/, yielding /ts/, which would later have been simplified to /ss/.

The rhotic ⟨r⟩ has traditionally been interpreted as a voiced alveolar trill /r/ but its pattern of alternation with ⟨ḫ⟩ suggests it was a fricative (either uvular /ʁ/ or velar /ɣ/). In the Hellenistic period, Akkadian ⟨r⟩ was transcribed using the Greek ρ, indicating it was pronounced similarly as an alveolar sound (though Greeks may also have perceived a uvular trill as ρ).

==== Descent from Proto-Semitic ====
Several Proto-Semitic phonemes are lost in Akkadian. The Proto-Semitic glottal stop *ʔ, as well as the fricatives *ʕ, *h, *ḥ are lost as consonants, either by sound change or orthographically, but they gave rise to the vowel quality e not exhibited in Proto-Semitic. The voiceless lateral fricatives (*ś, *ṣ́) merged with the sibilants as in Canaanite, leaving 19 consonantal phonemes. Old Akkadian preserved the /*ś/ phoneme longest but it eventually merged with /*š/, beginning in the Old Babylonian period. The following table shows Proto-Semitic phonemes and their correspondences among Akkadian, Modern Standard Arabic and Tiberian Hebrew:

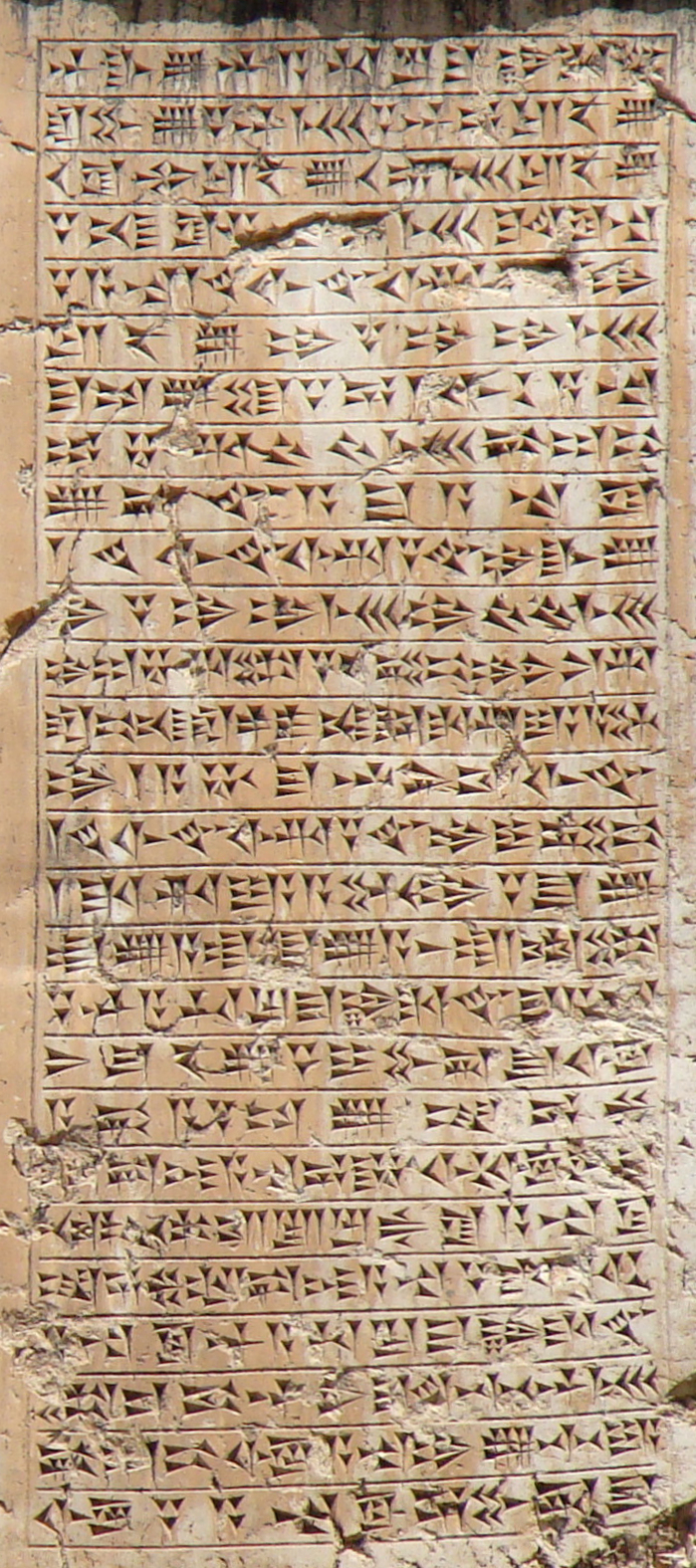
An inscription in Babylonian, in the Xerxes I inscription at Van, 5th century BC

Proto-Semitic	Akkadian	Arabic		Aramaic		Hebrew	
*b	b	ب	b	𐡁	b/ḇ	ב	b/ḇ
*d	d	د	d	𐡃	d/ḏ	ד	d/ḏ
*g	g	ج	ǧ	𐡂	g/ḡ	ג	g/ḡ
*p	p	ف	f	𐡐	p/p̄	פ	p/p̄
*t	t	ت	t	𐡕	t/ṯ	ת	t/ṯ
*k	k	ك	k	𐡊	k/ḵ	כ	k/ḵ
*ʔ	(∅)/ ʾ	ء	ʾ	𐡀	ʾ	א	ʾ
*ṭ	ṭ	ط	ṭ	𐡈	ṭ	ט	ṭ
*ḳ	q	ق	q	𐡒	q	ק	q
*ḏ	z	ذ	ḏ	𐡆 ,𐡃	ḏ, d/ḏ	ז	z
*z	z	ز	z	𐡆	z	ז	z
*ṯ	š	ث	ṯ	𐡔 ,𐡕	ṯ, t/ṯ	שׁ	š
*š	š	س	s	𐡔	š	שׁ	š
*ś	š	ش	š	𐡔 ,𐡎	ś, s	שׂ	ś
*s	s	س	s	𐡎	s	ס	s
*ṱ	ṣ	ظ	ẓ	𐡑 ,𐡈	ṯ̣, ṭ	צ	ṣ
*ṣ	ṣ	ص	ṣ	𐡑	ṣ	צ	ṣ
*ṣ́	ṣ	ض	ḍ	𐡒 ,𐡏	ṣ́, ʿ	צ	ṣ
*ġ	ḫ	غ	ġ	𐡏	ġ, ʿ	ע	ʿ
*ʕ	ḫ / (e) (Note: These are only distinguished from the ∅ (zero) reflexes of /h/ and /ʔ/ by /e/-coloring the adjacent vowel *a, e.g. PS *ˈbaʕ(a)l-um ('owner, lord') → Akk. bēlu(m) (Dolgopolsky 1999, p. 35).)	ع	ʿ	𐡏	ʿ	ע	ʿ
*ḫ	ḫ	خ	ḫ	𐡇	ḫ, ḥ	ח	ḥ
*ḥ	(e)	ح	ḥ	𐡇	ḥ	ח	ḥ
*h	(∅)	ه	h	𐡄	h	ה	h
*m	m	م	m	𐡌	m	מ	m
*n	n	ن	n	𐡍	n	נ	n
*r	r	ر	r	𐡓	r	ר	r
*l	l	ل	l	𐡋	l	ל	l
*w	w	و	w	𐡅	w	ו	w
*y	y	ي	y	𐡉	y	י	y
Proto-Semitic	Akkadian	Arabic		Aramaic		Hebrew	

=== Vowels ===
	Front	Central	Back
Close	i		u
Mid	e		(o)
Open		a	

The existence of a back mid vowel /o/ has been proposed, but the cuneiform writing gives no good proof for this. There is limited contrast between different u-signs in lexical texts, but this scribal differentiation may reflect the superimposition of the Sumerian phonological system (for which an /o/ phoneme has also been proposed), rather than a separate phoneme in Akkadian.

All consonants and vowels appear in long and short forms. Long consonants are transliterated as double consonants, and inconsistently written as such in cuneiform. Long vowels are transliterated with a macron (ā, ē, ī, ū) or a circumflex (â, ê, î, û), the latter being used for long vowels arising from the contraction of vowels in hiatus. The distinction between long and short is phonemic, and is used in the grammar; for example, iprusu ('that he decided') versus iprusū ('they decided').

=== Stress ===
There is broad agreement among most Assyriologists about Akkadian stress patterns. The rules of Akkadian stress were originally reconstructed by means of a comparison with other Semitic languages, and the resulting picture was gradually amended using internal linguistic evidence from Akkadian sources, especially deriving from so-called plene spellings (spellings with an extra vowel).

According to this widely accepted system, the place of stress in Akkadian is completely predictable and sensitive to syllable weight. There are three syllable weights: light (ending in -V); heavy (ending in -V̄ or -VC), and superheavy (ending in -V̂, -V̄C or -V̂C). If the last syllable is superheavy, it is stressed, otherwise the rightmost heavy non-final syllable is stressed. If a word contains only light syllables, the first syllable is stressed. It has also been argued that monosyllabic words generally are not stressed but rather function as clitics. The special behaviour of /V̂/ syllables is explained by their functioning, in accordance with their historical origin, as sequences of two syllables, of which the first one bears stress.

A rule of Akkadian phonology is that certain short (and probably unstressed) vowels are dropped. The rule is that the last vowel of a succession of syllables that end in a short vowel is dropped, for example the declinational root of the verbal adjective of a root PRS is paris-. Thus the masculine singular nominative is parsum (< *paris-um) but the feminine singular nominative is paristum (< *paris-at-um). Additionally there is a general tendency of syncope of short vowels in the later stages of Akkadian.

== Grammar ==
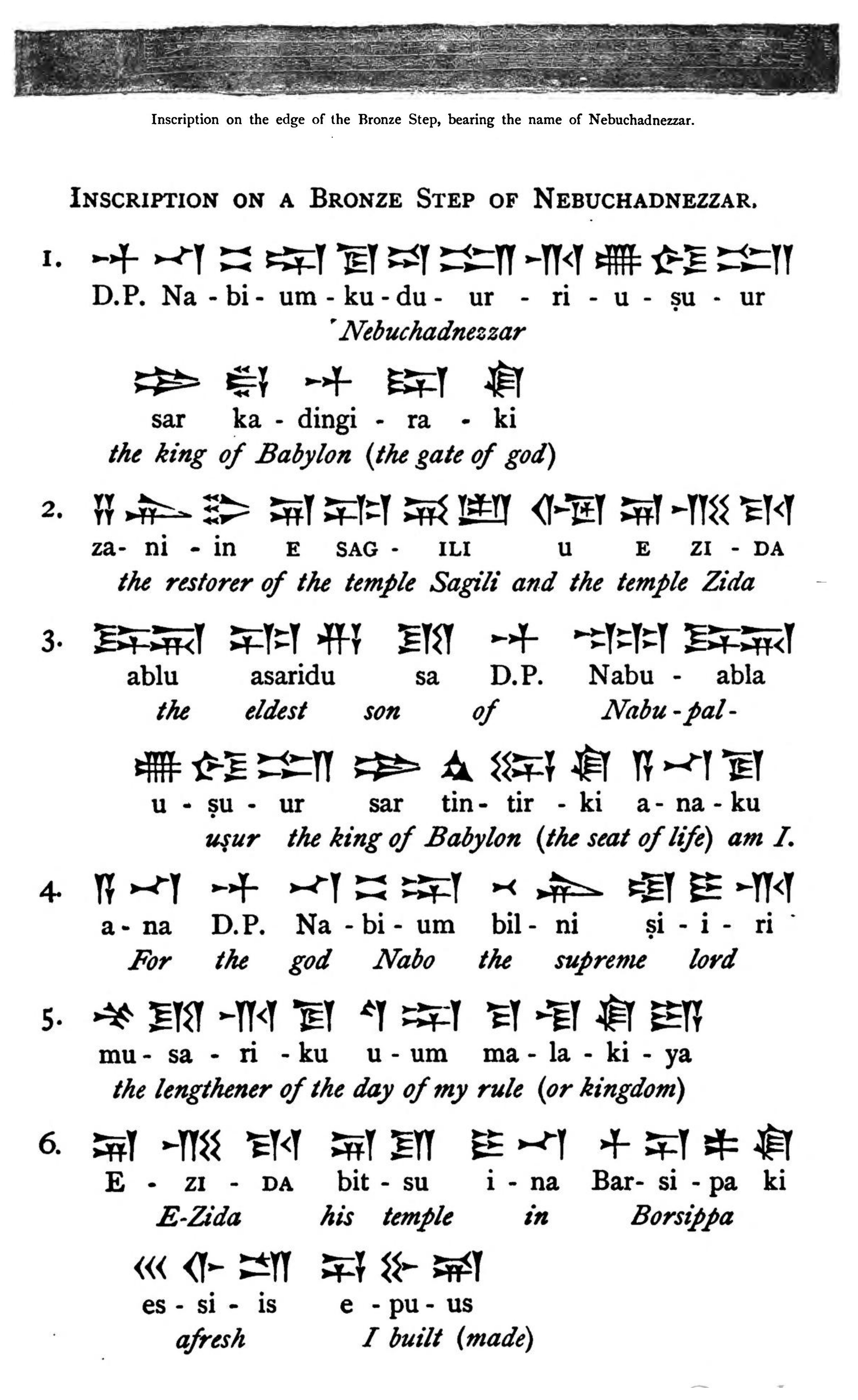
Neo-Babylonian inscription of king Nebuchadnezzar II, 7th century BC

=== Morphology ===
==== Consonantal root ====
Most roots of the Akkadian language consist of three consonants, called the radicals, but some roots are composed of four consonants, so-called quadriradicals. The radicals are occasionally represented in transcription in upper-case letters, for example PRS (to decide). Between and around these radicals various infixes, suffixes and prefixes, having word generating or grammatical functions, are inserted. The resulting consonant-vowel pattern differentiates the original meaning of the root. The middle radical can be geminated, which is represented by a doubled consonant in transcription, and sometimes in the cuneiform writing itself.

The consonants ʔ, w, j and n are termed "weak radicals" and roots containing these radicals give rise to irregular forms.

==== Case, number and gender ====
Formally, Akkadian has three numbers (singular, dual and plural) and three cases (nominative, accusative and genitive). However, even in the earlier stages of the language, the dual number is vestigial, and its use is largely confined to natural pairs (eyes, ears, etc.). Adjectives are never found in the dual. In the dual and plural, the accusative and genitive are merged into a single oblique case.

Akkadian, unlike Arabic, has only "sound" plurals formed by means of a plural ending. Broken plurals are not formed by changing the word stem. As in all Semitic languages, some masculine nouns take the prototypically feminine plural ending (-āt).

The nouns šarrum (king) and šarratum (queen) and the adjective dannum (strong) will serve to illustrate the case system of Akkadian.

Noun and adjective paradigms
		Noun		Adjective	
Number / Case		masc.	fem.	masc.	fem.
Singular	Nominative	šarr-um	šarr-at-um	dann-um	dann-at-um
Singular	Genitive	šarr-im	šarr-at-im	dann-im	dann-at-im
Singular	Accusative	šarr-am	šarr-at-am	dann-am	dann-at-am
Dual	Nominative	šarr-ān	šarr-at-ān		
Dual	Oblique (Note: The oblique case includes the accusative and genitive.)	šarr-īn	šarr-at-īn		
Plural	Nominative	šarr-ū	šarr-āt-um	dann-ūt-um	dann-āt-um
Plural	Oblique	šarr-ī	šarr-āt-im	dann-ūt-im	dann-āt-im

As is clear from the above table, the adjective and noun endings differ only in the masculine plural. Certain nouns, primarily those referring to geography, can also form a locative ending in -um in the singular and the resulting forms serve as adverbials. These forms are generally not productive, but in the Neo-Babylonian the um-locative replaces several constructions with the preposition ina.

In the later stages of Akkadian, the mimation (word-final -m) and nunation (dual final -n) that occurred at the end of most case endings disappeared, except in the locative. Later, the nominative and accusative singular of masculine nouns collapsed to -u and in Neo-Babylonian most word-final short vowels were dropped. As a result, case differentiation disappeared from all forms except masculine plural nouns. However, many texts continued the practice of writing the case endings, although often sporadically and incorrectly. As the most important contact language throughout this period was Aramaic, which itself lacks case distinctions, it is possible that Akkadian's loss of cases was an areal as well as phonological phenomenon.

==== Noun states and nominal sentences ====
Cylinder of Antiochus I

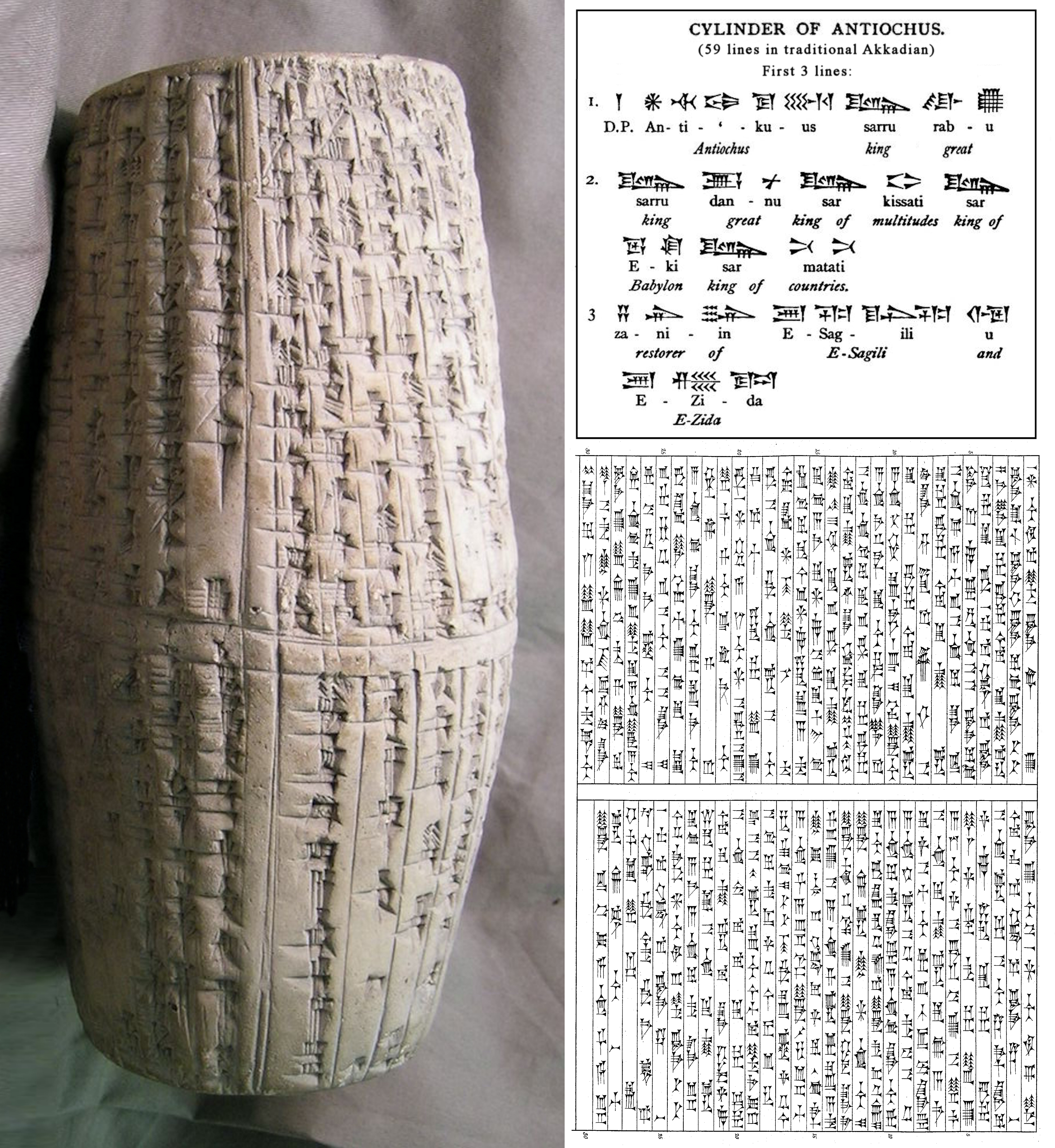
The Antiochus cylinder, written by Antiochus I Soter, as great king of kings of Babylon, restorer of gods E-sagila and E-zida, c. 250 BC. Written in traditional Akkadian.

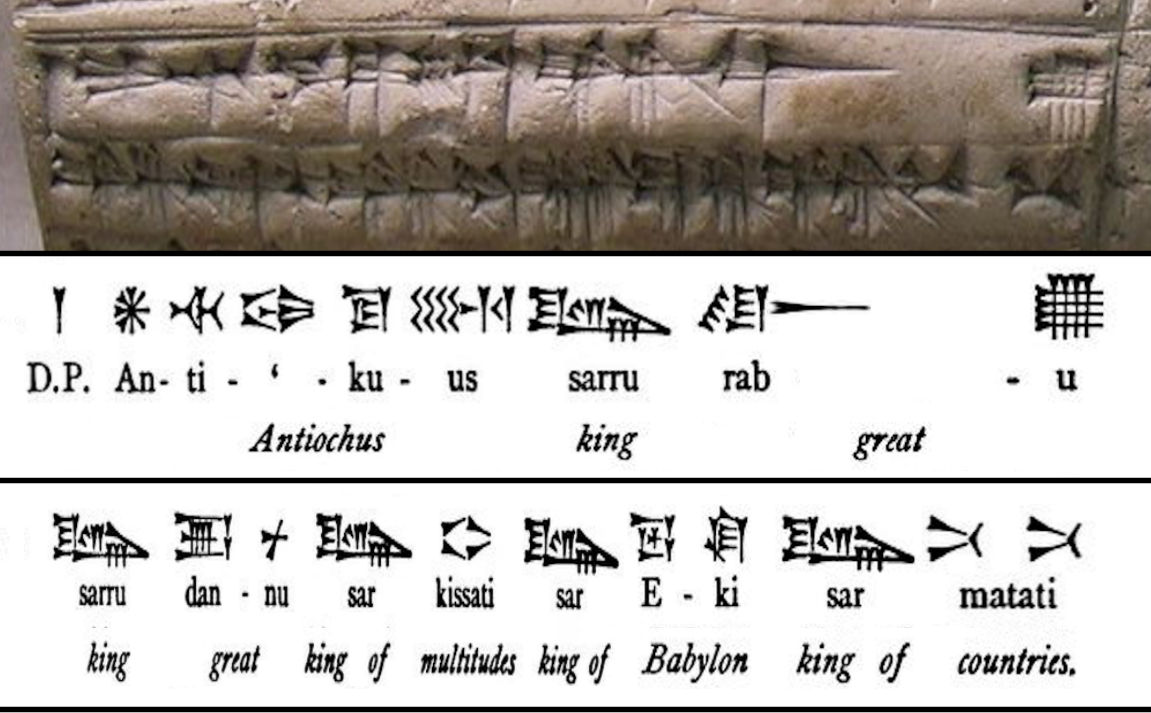
Antiochus I Soter with titles in Akkadian on the cylinder of Antiochus:
"Antiochus, King, Great King, King of multitudes, King of Babylon, King of countries"

As is also the case in other Semitic languages, Akkadian nouns may appear in a variety of "states" depending on their grammatical function in a sentence. The basic form of the noun is the status rectus (the governed state), which is the form as described above, complete with case endings. In addition to this, Akkadian has the status absolutus (the absolute state) and the status constructus (construct state). The latter is found in all other Semitic languages, while the former appears only in Akkadian and some dialects of Aramaic.

The status absolutus is characterised by the loss of a noun's case ending (e.g. awīl < awīlum, šar < šarrum). It is relatively uncommon, and is used chiefly to mark the predicate of a nominal sentence, in fixed adverbial expressions, and in expressions relating to measurements of length, weight, and the like.

Awīl-um šū šarrāq
man.NOM 3SG.MASC thief.ABSOLUTUS
This man is a thief

šarrum lā šanān
king.NOM.RECTUS NEG oppose.INF.ABSOLUTUS
The king who cannot be rivaled

The status constructus is more common by far, and has a much wider range of applications. It is employed when a noun is followed by another noun in the genitive, a pronominal suffix, or a verbal clause in the subjunctive, and typically takes the shortest form of the noun which is phonetically possible. In general, this amounts to the loss of case endings with short vowels, with the exception of the genitive -i in nouns preceding a pronominal suffix, hence:

māri-šu
son.CONSTRUCTUS-3SG.POSS
His son, its (masculine) son

but

mār šarr-im
son.CONSTRUCTUS king.GEN.SG
The king's son

There are numerous exceptions to this general rule, usually involving potential violations of the language's phonological limitations. Most obviously, Akkadian does not tolerate word-final consonant clusters, so nouns like kalbum (dog) and maḫrum (front) would have illegal construct state forms *kalb and *maḫr unless modified. In many of these instances, the first vowel of the word is simply repeated (e.g. kalab, maḫar). This rule, however, does not always hold true, especially in nouns where a short vowel has historically been elided (e.g. šaknum < *šakinum "governor"). In these cases, the lost vowel is restored in the construct state (so šaknum yields šakin).

kalab belim
dog.CONSTRUCTUS master.GEN.SG
The master's dog

šakin ālim
governor.CONSTRUCTUS city.GEN.SG
The city's governor

A genitive relation can also be expressed with the relative preposition ša, and the noun that the genitive phrase depends on appears in status rectus.

salīmātum ša awīl Ešnunna
Alliances.NOM.RECTUS which man.CONSTRUCTUS Ešnunna.GEN
The alliances of the Ruler of Ešnunna (lit. "Alliances which man of Ešnunna (has)")

The same preposition is also used to introduce true relative clauses, in which case the verb is placed in the subjunctive mood.

awīl-um ša māt-am i-kšud-∅-u
man.NOM that land.SG.ACC 3-conquer.PRET-SG.MASC-SJV
The man who conquered the land.

==== Verbal morphology ====
===== Verb aspects =====
The Akkadian verb has six finite verb aspects (preterite, perfect, present, imperative, precative, and vetitive (the negative form of precative)) and three infinite forms (infinitive, participle and verbal adjective). The preterite is used for actions that are seen by the speaker as having occurred at a single point in time. The present is primarily imperfective in meaning and is used for concurrent and future actions as well as past actions with a temporal dimension. The final three finite forms are injunctive where the imperative and the precative together form a paradigm for positive commands and wishes, and the vetitive is used for negative wishes. The periphrastic prohibitive, formed by the present form of the verb and the negative adverb lā, is used to express negative commands.

The infinitive of the Akkadian verb is a verbal noun, and in contrast to some other languages the Akkadian infinitive can be declined in case. The verbal adjective is an adjectival form and designates the state or the result of the action of the verb, and consequently the exact meaning of the verbal adjective is determined by the semantics of the verb itself. The participle, which can be active or passive, is another verbal adjective and its meaning is similar to the English gerund.

The following table shows the conjugation of the G-stem verbs derived from the root PRS ("to decide") in the various verb aspects of Akkadian:

			Preterite	Perfect	Present	Imperative	Stative	Infinitive	Participle (active)	Verbal adjective
1st person	singular		aprus	aptaras	aparras		parsāku	parāsum	pārisum (m.) / pāristum (f.)	parsum (m.) / paristum (f.)
1st person	plural		niprus	niptaras	niparras		parsānu	parāsum	pārisum (m.) / pāristum (f.)	parsum (m.) / paristum (f.)
2nd person	singular	masc.	taprus	taptaras	taparras	purus	parsāta	parāsum	pārisum (m.) / pāristum (f.)	parsum (m.) / paristum (f.)
2nd person	singular	fem.	taprusī	taptarsī (< *taptarasī)	taparrasī	pursi	parsāti	parāsum	pārisum (m.) / pāristum (f.)	parsum (m.) / paristum (f.)
2nd person	plural		taprusā	taptarsā	taparrasā	pursa	parsātunu (m.) / parsātina (f.)	parāsum	pārisum (m.) / pāristum (f.)	parsum (m.) / paristum (f.)
3rd person	singular		iprus	iptaras	iparras		paris (m.) / parsat (f.)	parāsum	pārisum (m.) / pāristum (f.)	parsum (m.) / paristum (f.)
3rd person	plural	masc.	iprusū	iptarsū (< *iptarasū)	iparrasū		parsū	parāsum	pārisum (m.) / pāristum (f.)	parsum (m.) / paristum (f.)
3rd person	plural	fem.	iprusā	iptarsā (< *iptarasā)	iparrasā		parsā	parāsum	pārisum (m.) / pāristum (f.)	parsum (m.) / paristum (f.)

The table below shows the different affixes attached to the preterite aspect of the verb root PRS "to decide"; and as can be seen, the grammatical genders differ only in the second person singular and third person plural.

			G-stem	D-stem	Š-stem	N-stem
1st person	singular		a-prus	u-parris	u-šapris	a-pparis
1st person	plural		ni-prus	nu-parris	nu-šapris	ni-pparis
2nd person	singular	masc.	ta-prus	tu-parris	tu-šapris	ta-pparis
2nd person	singular	fem.	ta-prus-ī	tu-parris-ī	tu-šapris-ī	ta-ppars-ī
2nd person	plural		ta-prus-ā	tu-parris-ā	tu-šapris-ā	ta-ppars-ā
3rd person	singular		i-prus	u-parris	u-šapris	i-pparis
3rd person	plural	masc.	i-prus-ū	u-parris-ū	u-šapris-ū	i-ppars-ū
3rd person	plural	fem.	i-prus-ā	u-parris-ā	u-šapris-ā	i-ppars-ā

===== Verb moods =====
Akkadian verbs have three moods:

1. Indicative, used in independent clauses, is unmarked.
2. Subjunctive, used in dependent clauses, is marked in forms which do not end in a vowel by the suffix -u (compare Arabic and Ugaritic subjunctives) but is otherwise unmarked. In the later stages of most dialects, the subjunctive is indistinct, as short final vowels were mostly lost.
3. Venitive or allative, not a mood in the strictest sense, being a development of the first-person dative pronominal suffix -am/-m/-nim. With verbs of motion, it often indicates motion toward an object or person (e.g., illik, "he went" vs. illikam, "he came"). However, this pattern is not consistent, even in earlier stages of the language, and its use often appears to serve a stylistic rather than morphological or lexical function.

The following table demonstrates the verb moods of verbs derived from the root PRS ("to decide", "to separate"):

	Preterite (Note: Both verbs are for the 3rd person masculine singular.)	Stative
Indicative	iprus	paris
Subjunctive	iprusu	parsu
Venitive	iprusam	parsam

===== Verb patterns =====
Akkadian verbs have thirteen separate derived stems formed on each root. The basic, underived, stem is the G-stem (from the German Grundstamm, meaning "basic stem"). Causative or intensive forms are formed with the doubled D-stem, and it gets its name from the doubled-middle radical that is characteristic of this form. The doubled middle radical is also characteristic of the present. The forms of the D-stem use the secondary conjugational affixes, so a D-form will never be identical to a form in a different stem. The Š-stem is formed by adding a prefix š-, and these forms are mostly causatives. The passive forms of the verb are in the N-stem, formed by adding a n- prefix. The n- element is assimilated to a following consonant, so the original /n/ is only visible in a few forms.

Reflexive and iterative verbal stems can be derived from each of the basic stems. The reflexive stem is formed with an infix -ta, and the derived stems are therefore called Gt, Dt, Št and Nt, and the preterite forms of the Xt-stem are identical to the perfects of the X-stem. Iteratives are formed with the infix -tan-, giving the Gtn, Dtn, Štn and Ntn. Because of the assimilation of n, the /n/ is only seen in the present forms, and the Xtn preterite is identical to the Xt durative.

The final stem is the ŠD-stem, a form mostly attested only in poetic texts, and whose meaning is usually identical to either the Š-stem or the D-stem of the same verb. It is formed with the Š prefix (like the Š-stem) in addition to a doubled-middle radical (like the D-stem).

An alternative to this naming system is a numerical system. The basic stems are numbered using Roman numerals so that G, D, Š and N become I, II, III and IV, respectively. The infixes are numbered using Arabic numerals; 1 for the forms without an infix, 2 for the Xt, and 3 for the Xtn. The two numbers are separated using a solidus. As an example, the Štn-stem is called III/3. The most important user of this system is the Chicago Assyrian Dictionary.

There is mandatory congruence between the subject of the sentence and the verb. This is expressed by prefixes and suffixes. There are two different sets of affixes, a primary set used for the forms of the G and N-stems, and a secondary set for the D and Š-stems.

The stems, their nomenclature and examples of the third-person masculine singular stative of the verb parāsum (root PRS: 'to decide, distinguish, separate') is shown below:

#	Stem	Verb	Description	Correspondence
I.1	G	PaRiS	the simple stem, used for transitive and intransitive verbs	Arabic stem I (fa'ala) and Hebrew pa'al
II.1	D	PuRRuS	gemination of the second radical, indicating the intensive	Arabic stem II (faʿʿala) and Hebrew pi'el
III.1	Š	šuPRuS	š-preformative, indicating the causative	Arabic stem IV ('afʿala) and Hebrew hiph'il
IV.1	N	naPRuS	n-preformative, indicating the reflexive/passive	Arabic stem VII (infaʿala) and Hebrew niph'al
I.2	Gt	PitRuS	simple stem with t-infix after first radical, indicating reciprocal or reflexive	Arabic stem VIII (iftaʿala) and Aramaic 'ithpe'al (tG)
II.2	Dt	PutaRRuS	doubled second radical preceded by infixed t, indicating intensive reflexive	Arabic stem V (tafaʿʿala) and Hebrew hithpa'el (tD)
III.2	Št	šutaPRuS	š-preformative with t-infix, indicating reflexive causative	Arabic stem X (istafʿala) and Aramaic 'ittaph'al (tC)
IV.2	Nt	itaPRuS	n-preformative with a t-infix preceding the first radical, indicating reflexive passive	
I.3	Gtn	PitaRRuS		
II.3	Dtn	PutaRRuS	doubled second radical preceded by tan-infix	
III.3	Štn	šutaPRuS	š-preformative with tan-infix	
IV.3	Ntn	itaPRuS	n-preformative with tan-infix	
	ŠD	šuPuRRuS	š-preformative with doubled second radical	

=== Stative ===
A very often appearing form which can be formed by nouns, adjectives as well as by verbal adjectives is the stative. Nominal predicatives occur in the status absolutus and correspond to the verb "to be" in English. The stative in Akkadian corresponds to the Egyptian pseudo-participle. The following table contains an example of using the noun šarrum (king), the adjective rapšum (wide) and the verbal adjective parsum (decided).

			šarrum	rapšum	parsum
1st person	singular		šarr-āku	rapš-āku	pars-āku
1st person	plural		šarr-ānu	rapš-ānu	pars-ānu
2nd person	singular	masc.	šarr-āta	rapš-āta	pars-āta
2nd person	singular	fem.	šarr-āti	rapš-āti	pars-āti
2nd person	plural	masc.	šarr-ātunu	rapš-ātunu	pars-ātunu
2nd person	plural	fem.	šarr-ātina	rapš-ātina	pars-ātina
3rd person	singular	masc.	šar	rapaš	paris
3rd person	singular	fem.	šarr-at	rapš-at	pars-at
3rd person	plural	masc.	šarr-ū	rapš-ū	pars-ū
3rd person	plural	fem.	šarr-ā	rapš-ā	pars-ā

Thus, the stative in Akkadian is used to convert simple stems into effective sentences, so that the form šarr-āta is equivalent to: "you were king", "you are king" and "you will be king". Hence, the stative is independent of time forms.

=== Derivation ===
Beside the already explained possibility of derivation of different verb stems, Akkadian has numerous nominal formations derived from verb roots. A very frequently encountered form is the maPRaS form. It can express the location of an event, the person performing the act and many other meanings. If one of the root consonants is labial (p, b, m), the prefix becomes na- (maPRaS > naPRaS). Examples for this are: maškanum (place, location) from ŠKN (set, place, put), mašraḫum (splendour) from ŠRḪ (be splendid), maṣṣarum (guards) from NṢR (guard), napḫarum (sum) from PḪR (summarize).

A very similar formation is the maPRaSt form. The noun derived from this nominal formation is grammatically feminine. The same rules as for the maPRaS form apply, for example maškattum (deposit) from ŠKN (set, place, put), narkabtum (carriage) from RKB (ride, drive, mount).

The suffix -ūt is used to derive abstract nouns. The nouns which are formed with this suffix are grammatically feminine. The suffix can be attached to nouns, adjectives and verbs, e.g. abūtum (paternity) from abum (father), rabûtum (size) from rabûm (large), waṣûtum (leaving) from WṢY (leave).

Also derivatives of verbs from nouns, adjectives and numerals are numerous. For the most part, a D-stem is derived from the root of the noun or adjective. The derived verb then has the meaning of "make X do something" or "becoming X", for example: duššûm (let sprout) from dīšum (grass), šullušum (to do something for the third time ) from šalāš (three).

=== Pronouns ===
==== Personal pronouns ====
===== Independent personal pronouns =====
Independent personal pronouns in Akkadian are as follows:

		Nominative		Oblique		Dative	
Person		singular	plural	singular	plural	singular	plural
1st		anāku "I"	nīnu "we"	yâti	niāti	yâšim	niāšim
2nd	masculine	atta "you"	attunu "you"	kâti (kâta)	kunūti	kâšim	kunūšim
2nd	feminine	atti "you"	attina "you"	kâti	kināti	kâšim	kināšim
3rd	masculine	šū "he"	šunu "they"	šātilu (šātilu)	šunūti	šuāšim (šāšim)	šunūšim
3rd	feminine	šī "she"	šina "they"	šiāti (šuāti, šâti)	šināti	šiāšim (šâšim)	šināšim

===== Suffixed (or enclitic) pronouns =====
Suffixed (or enclitic) pronouns (mainly denoting the genitive, accusative and dative) are as follows:

		Genitive		Accusative		Dative	
Person		singular	plural	singular	plural	singular	plural
1st		-i, -ya (Note: -ni is used for the nominative, i.e. following a verb denoting the subject.)	-ni	-ni	-niāti	-am/-nim	-niāšim
2nd	masculine	-ka	-kunu	-ka	-kunūti	-kum	-kunūšim
2nd	feminine	-ki	-kina	-ki	-kināti	-kim	-kināšim
3rd	masculine	-šu	-šunu	-šu	-šunūti	-šum	-šunūšim
3rd	feminine	-ša	-šina	-ši	-šināti	-šim	-šināšim

==== Demonstrative pronouns ====
Demonstrative pronouns in Akkadian differ from the Western Semitic variety. The following tables show the Akkadian demonstrative pronouns according to near and far deixis:

Proximal demonstrative ("this", "these")
		Masculine	Feminine
Singular	Nominative	annûm	annītum
Singular	Accusative	anniam	annītam
Singular	Genitive	annîm	annītim
Plural	Nominative	annûtum	anniātum
Plural	Accusative/Genitive	annûtim	anniātim

Distal demonstrative ("that", "those")
		Masculine	Feminine
Singular	Nomiative	ullûm	ullītum
Singular	Accusative	ulliam	ullītam
Singular	Genitive	ullîm	ullītim
Plural	Nominative	ullûtum	ulliātum
Plural	Accusative/Genitive	ullûtim	ulliātim

==== Relative pronouns ====
Relative pronouns in Akkadian are shown in the following table:

		Nominative	Accusative	Genitive
Singular	masc.	šu	ša	ši
Singular	fem.	šāt	šāti	
Dual		šā		
Plural	masc.	šūt		
Plural	fem.	šāt		

Unlike plural relative pronouns, singular relative pronouns in Akkadian exhibit full declension for case. Only the form ša (originally accusative masculine singular) survived, while the other forms disappeared in time.

==== Interrogative pronouns ====
The following table shows the interrogative pronouns used in Akkadian:

Akkadian	English
mannum	who?
mīnum, minûm	what?
ayyum	which?

=== Prepositions ===
Akkadian has prepositions which consist mainly of only one word. For example: ina (in, on, out, through, under), ana (to, for, after, approximately), adi (to), aššum (because of), eli (up, over), ištu/ultu (of, since), mala (in accordance with), itti (also, with). There are some compound prepositions which are combined with ina and ana (e.g. ina maḫar (forwards), ina balu (without), ana ṣēr (up to), ana maḫar (forwards). Regardless of the complexity of the preposition, the following noun is always in the genitive case.

Examples: ina bītim (in the house, from the house), ana dummuqim (to do good), itti šarrim (with the king), ana ṣēr mārīšu (up to his son).

=== Numerals ===
Since numerals are written mostly as a number sign in the cuneiform script, the transliteration of many numerals is not well ascertained yet. Along with the counted noun, the cardinal numerals are in the status absolutus. Because other cases are very rare, the forms of the status rectus are known only by isolated numerals. The numerals 1 and 2 as well as 21–29, 31–39, 41–49 correspond with the counted in the grammatical gender. The numerals 3–20, 30, 40 and 50 are characterized by polarity of gender, i.e. if the counted noun is masculine, the numeral would be feminine and vice versa.

This polarity is typical of the Semitic languages and appears, for example, in classical Arabic. The numerals 60, 100, and 1,000 do not change according to the gender of the counted noun. Counted nouns more than two appear in the plural form. Body parts that occur in pairs appear in the dual form in Akkadian; e.g., šēpum (foot) becomes šēpān (two feet).

The ordinals are formed (with few exceptions) by adding a case ending to the nominal form PaRuS. The P, R and S must be substituted with the suitable consonants of the numeral. It is noted, that in the case of the numeral "one", the ordinal (masculine) and the cardinal number are the same. A metathesis occurs in the numeral "four".

Akkadian numbers
#	Cardinal				Congruence	Ordinal	
#	(masculine)		(feminine)		(Gender agreement of the cardinal numeral)	(masculine)	(feminine)
#	(absolute)	(free)	(absolute)	(free)	(Gender agreement of the cardinal numeral)	(masculine)	(feminine)
1	ištēn	(ištēnum)	išteat, ištēt	(ištētum)	Congruent (no gender polarity)	pānûm maḫrûm (ištīʾum) ištēn	pānītum maḫrītum (ištītum) išteat
2	šinā	—	šittā	—	Congruent	šanûm	šanītum
3	šalāšat	šalāštum	šalāš	šalāšum	Gender polarity	šalšum	šaluštum
4	erbet(ti)	erbettum	erbe, erba	erbûm	Gender polarity	rebûm	rebūtum
5	ḫamšat	ḫamištum	ḫamiš	ḫamšum	Gender polarity	ḫamšum	ḫamuštum
6	šeššet	šedištum	šediš?	šeššum	Gender polarity	šeššum	šeduštum
7	sebet(ti)	sebettum	sebe	sebûm	Gender polarity	sebûm	sebūtum
8	samānat	samāntum	samāne	samānûm	Gender polarity	samnum	samuntum
9	tišīt	tišītum	tiše	tišûm	Gender polarity	tešûm	tešūtum
10	eš(e)ret	ešertum	ešer	eš(e)rum	Gender polarity	ešrum	ešurtum
11	ištēššeret		ištēššer		Gender polarity	ištēššerûm	ištēššerītum
12	šinšeret		šinšer		Gender polarity	šinšerûm	šinšerītum
13	šalāššeret		šalāššer		Gender polarity	šalāššerûm	šalāššerītum
14	erbēšeret		erbēšer		Gender polarity	erbēšerûm	erbēšerītum
15	ḫamiššeret		ḫamiššer		Gender polarity	ḫamiššerûm	ḫamiššerītum
16	šeššeret?		šeššer?		Gender polarity	šeššerûm?	šeššerītum?
17	sebēšeret		sebēšer		Gender polarity	sebēšerûm	sebēšerītum
18	samāššeret		samāššer		Gender polarity	samāššerûm	samāššerītum
19	tišēšeret		tišēšer		Gender polarity	tišēšerûm	tišēšerītum
20	ešrā				No gender distinction	ešrûm	ešrītum?
30	šalāšā				No gender distinction	(as with 20?)	
40	erbeā, erbâ				No gender distinction	(as with 20?)	
50	ḫamšā				No gender distinction	(as with 20?)	
60	absolute šūš(i), free šūšum				No gender distinction	(as with 20?)	
100	absolute sg. meat, pl. meât (free meatum)				No gender distinction	(as with 20?)	
600	absolute nēr, free nērum				No gender distinction	(as with 20?)	
1000	absolute līm(i), free līmum				No gender distinction	(as with 20?)	
3600	absolute šār, free šārum				No gender distinction	(as with 20?)	

Examples: erbē aššātum (four wives) (masculine numeral), meat ālānū (100 towns).

=== Syntax ===
==== Nominal phrases ====
Adjectives, relative clauses and appositions follow the noun. Numerals precede the counted noun. In the following table the nominal phrase erbēt šarrū dannūtum ša ālam īpušū abūya 'the four strong kings who built the city are my fathers' is analyzed:

Word	Meaning	Analysis	Part of the nominal phrase
erbēt	four	masculine (gender polarity)	Numeral
šarr-ū	king	nominative plural	Noun (subject)
dann-ūtum	strong	nominative masculine plural	Adjective
ša	which	relative pronoun	Relative clause
āl-am	city	accusative singular	Relative clause
īpuš-ū	built	3rd person masculine plural	Relative clause
ab-ū-ya	my fathers	masculine plural + possessive pronoun	Apposition

==== Sentence syntax ====
Akkadian sentence order was subject–object–verb (SOV), which sets it apart from most other ancient Semitic languages such as Arabic and Biblical Hebrew, which typically have a verb–subject–object (VSO) word order. Modern South Semitic languages in Ethiopia also have SOV order, but these developed within historical times from the classical verb–subject–object (VSO) language Ge'ez. It has been hypothesized that this word order was a result of influence from the Sumerian language, which was also SOV. There is evidence that native speakers of both languages were in intimate language contact, forming a single society for at least 500 years, so it is entirely likely that a sprachbund could have formed. Further evidence of an original VSO or SVO ordering can be found in the fact that direct and indirect object pronouns are suffixed to the verb. Word order seems to have shifted to SVO/VSO late in the 1st millennium BC to the 1st millennium AD, possibly under the influence of Aramaic.

== Vocabulary ==
The Akkadian vocabulary is mostly of Semitic origin. Although classified as East Semitic, many elements of its basic vocabulary find no evident parallels in related Semitic languages: mārum 'son' (Semitic *bn), qātum 'hand' (Semitic *yd), šēpum 'foot' (Semitic *rgl), qabûm 'say' (Semitic *qwl), izuzzum 'stand' (Semitic *qwm), ana 'to, for' (Semitic *li).

Due to extensive contact with Sumerian and Aramaic, the Akkadian vocabulary contains many loan words from these languages. Aramaic loan words were limited to the 1st centuries of the 1st millennium BC and primarily in the north and middle parts of Mesopotamia. Sumerian loanwords were spread in the whole linguistic area. Beside the previous languages, some nouns were borrowed from Hurrian, Kassite, Ugaritic and other ancient languages.

Since Sumerian and Hurrian, two non-Semitic languages, differ from Akkadian in word structure, only nouns and some adjectives (not many verbs) were borrowed from these languages. Some verbs were borrowed, along with many nouns, from Aramaic and Ugaritic, both of which are Semitic languages.

The following table contains examples of loan words in Akkadian:

Akkadian	Meaning	Source	Word in the language of origin
dûm	hill	Sumerian	du
erēqum	flee	Aramaic	ʿRQ (root)
gadalûm	dressed in linen	Sumerian	gada lá
isinnum	firmly	Sumerian	ezen
kasulatḫum	a device of copper	Hurrian	kasulatḫ-
kisallum	court	Sumerian	kisal
laqāḫum	take	Ugaritic	LQḤ (root)
paraššannum	part of horse riding gear	Hurrian	paraššann-
purkullum	stone cutter	Sumerian	bur-gul
qaṭālum	kill	Aramaic	QṬL (root)
uriḫullum	conventional penalty	Hurrian	uriḫull-

Akkadian was also a source of borrowing to other Semitic languages such as biṣru "onion" (into Arabic: بَصَل, romanized: baṣal and Hebrew: בצל, romanized: batsal), āsu "myrtle" (آس ās) and so on, above all Sumerian with examples: Sumerian da-ri ('lastingly', from Akkadian dārum), Sumerian ra gaba ('riders, messenger', from Akkadian rākibum).

In 2011, the Oriental Institute of the University of Chicago completed a 21-volume dictionary, the Chicago Assyrian Dictionary, of the Akkadian language. The dictionary took 90 years to develop, beginning in 1921, with the first volume published in 1956. The completion of this work was hailed as a significant milestone for the study of the language by prominent academic Irving Finkel of the British Museum.

== Sample text ==
The following is the 7th section from Hammurabi's law code, written in the mid-18th century BC:

šumma awīl-um lū kasp-am lū ḫurāṣ-am lū ward-am lū amt-am
if man-NOM or silver-ACC or gold-ACC or slave-M.ACC or slave-F.ACC
If a man has bought silver or gold, a male or a female slave,

lū alp-am lū immer-am lū imēr-am ū lū {mimma šumšu} ina
or cattle/oxen-ACC or sheep-ACC or donkey-ACC and or something from
an ox, a sheep, or a donkey—or anything for that matter—

qāt mār awīl-im ū lū warad awīl-im balum šīb-ī u
hand-CONST son-CONST man-GEN and or slave-CONST man-GEN without witnesses-GEN and
from another man or from another man's slave without witnesses or contract,

riks-ātim i-štām-∅ ū lū ana maṣṣārūt-im i–mḫur-∅
contracts-GEN bought-3.SG.PERF and or for safekeeping-GEN received-3.SG.PRET
or if he accepted something for safekeeping without same,

awīl-um šū šarrāq i-ddāk
man-NOM he-3.M.SG stealer-ABS is_killed-3.SG.PASS-PRS
then this man is a thief and hence to be killed.

== Akkadian literature ==
- Atrahasis Epic (early 2nd millennium BC)
- Enûma Elish (c. 18th century BC)
- Amarna letters (14th century BC)
- Epic of Gilgamesh (Sin-liqe-unninni', Standard Babylonian version, 13th to 11th century BC)
- Ludlul Bel Nemeqi

== Sources ==
- Aro, Jussi (1957). Studien zur mittelbabylonischen Grammatik. Studia Orientalia 22. Helsinki: Societas Orientalis Fennica.
- Buccellati, Giorgio (1996). A Structural Grammar of Babylonian. Wiesbaden: Harrassowitz.
- Buccellati, Giorgio (1997). "Akkadian", The Semitic Languages. Ed. Robert Hetzron. New York: Routledge. Pages 69–99.
- Bussmann, Hadumod (1996). Routledge Dictionary of Language and Linguistics. New York: Routledge. ISBN 0-415-20319-8
- Caplice, Richard (1980). Introduction to Akkadian. Rome: Biblical Institute Press. (1983: ISBN 88-7653-440-7; 1988, 2002: ISBN 88-7653-566-7) (The 1980 edition is partly available online Archived 2006-05-07 at the Wayback Machine.)
- Dolgopolsky, Aron (1999). From Proto-Semitic to Hebrew. Milan: Centro Studi Camito-Semitici di Milano.
- Deutscher, G. (2000). Syntactic Change in Akkadian: The Evolution of Sentential Complementation. OUP Oxford. ISBN 978-0-19-154483-5. Archived from the original on 16 March 2020.
- Gelb, I.J. (1961). Old Akkadian Writing and Grammar. Second edition. Materials for the Assyrian Dictionary 2. Chicago: University of Chicago Press.
- George, A. (2007). "Babylonian and Assyrian: A History of Akkadian". In: Postgate, J. N., (ed.), Languages of Iraq, Ancient and Modern. London: British School of Archaeology in Iraq, p. 37. Online Archived 2020-07-31 at the Wayback Machine
- Huehnergard, John (2005). A Grammar of Akkadian (Second Edition). Eisenbrauns. ISBN 1-57506-922-9
- Luukko, Mikko; Van Buylaere, Greta (2017). "Languages and Writing Systems in Assyria". In E. Frahm (ed.). A Companion to Assyria. Hoboken: John Wiley & Sons. ISBN 978-1-118-32524-7.
- Marcus, David (1978). A Manual of Akkadian. University Press of America. ISBN 0-8191-0608-9
- Mercer, Samuel A B (1961). Introductory Assyrian Grammar. New York: F Ungar. ISBN 0-486-42815-X
- Sabatino Moscati (1980). An Introduction to Comparative Grammar of Semitic Languages Phonology and Morphology. Harrassowitz Verlag. ISBN 978-3-447-00689-7.
- Soden, Wolfram von (1952). Grundriss der akkadischen Grammatik. Analecta Orientalia 33. Roma: Pontificium Institutum Biblicum. (3rd ed., 1995: ISBN 88-7653-258-7)
- Woodard, Roger D. The Ancient Languages of Mesopotamia, Egypt and Aksum. Cambridge University Press 2008. ISBN 978-0-521-68497-2
