= Maipure language =

Extinct language of Venezuela

Maipure
- maipùri jucuàre
- Pronunciation: [maiˈpuɺi jukuˈaɺɛ]
- Native to: Venezuela
- Region: Orinoco
- Ethnicity: Maipure
- Extinct: late 18th century
- Language family: Arawakan: Upper Orinoco; Maipure–Avane; Maipure

Language codes
- ISO 639-3: None (mis)
- Glottolog: maip1246
- Historical distribution of the Maipure language before its extinction

Maipure (endonym: maipùri jucuàre, IPA: [maiˈpuɺi jukuˈaɺɛ]) is an extinct Arawakan (Maipurean) language formerly spoken in the Venezuelan state of Amazonas. The language began declining, and eventually went extinct, around the late 18th century. The Italian missionary and linguist Filippo S. Gilij documented the only significant information on Maipure. In addition, Gilij used Maipure as the cornerstone of the recognition of the Maipurean (Arawakan) language family.

== History ==
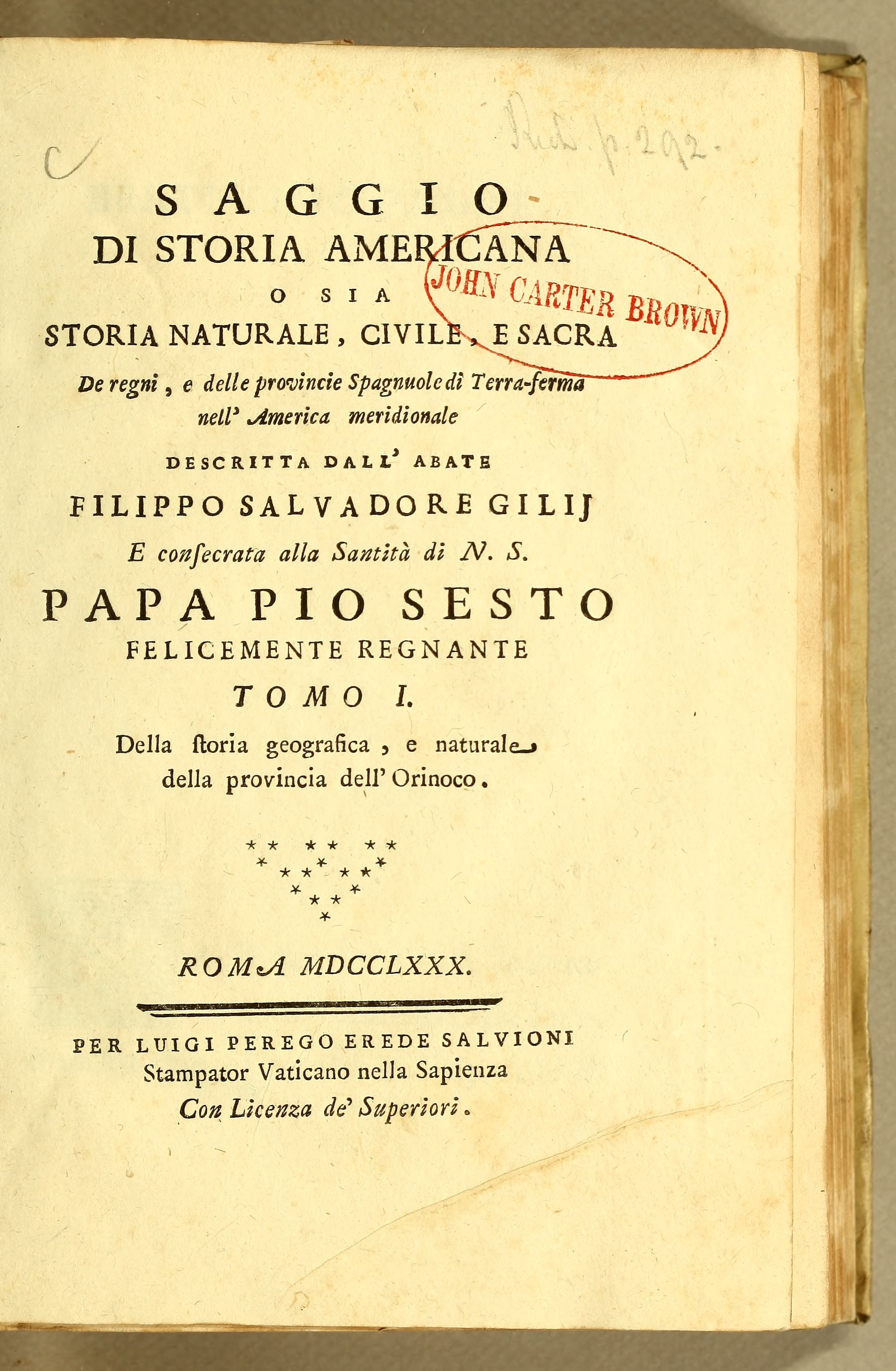
Title page of Saggio di storia americana (1780)

The Maipure language is thought to have possibly been used by other peoples of the region as a lingua franca, a common medium of communication among ethnic groups speaking different languages. By 1767, most of the Maipure had been missionized in two reducciones, or villages, along the middle Orinoco, being Caida de los Atures and Encaramada, along with various other peoples, including the Avane, Yavitero and Tamanaku. The multilingual situation the Maipure were placed in, along with the destruction of their culture, led to the rapid decline of their language, and it was "completely replaced with Spanish within a few generations" in the missions. The groups of Maipure who had not been missionized also lost their language, speculated by linguist Raoul Zamponi to have been due to "a lack of social cohesion".

=== Language contact ===
Maipure exhibits a number of Cariban loanwords. These include uɺuí 'cashew tree', (cf. Tamanaku: woroi, Galibi Carib: oːroi), kuɺukái 'copaiba balsam', (cf. Tamanaku: marana, Galibi Carib: kurukai), wisisí 'kind of duck', (cf. Tamanaku: witʃitʃi, Galibi Carib: wisisi), and kurúmu 'black vulture' (cf. Tamanaku: kirimu, Galibi Carib: kuruːmu). A possible Saliban loanword is also present in jumukí [jomuˈki] 'maize' (cf. Sáliba: dʒomo, Piaroa: ɲaʔmuɨh).

== Geographical distribution ==
Maipure was spoken along the Ventuari, Sipapo, and Autana rivers in the Upper Orinoco region. A 1767 report by Lorenzo Hervás indicates the Maipure who had not been missionized were distributed along the Upper Orinoco, the Rio Negro, and the Marañón rivers.

== Classification ==
In 1783, Gilij was the first to identify similarities between Maipure and a number of languages now classified as Arawakan, including Avane, which is so closely related to Maipure that it may be a dialect of it, Cabre, Guipunave, and Yavitero, in his book Saggio di storia americana (1780). His classification spawned the name "Maipurean" to designate the grouping, also known under the name "Arawakan" (after the Lokono language, also called Arawak), which currently comprises around 65 languages. According to Alexandra Aikhenvald (1999), Gilij compared Maipure with the Moxo languages to establish a connection between the two.

Linguist Terrence Kaufman (1994) gives the closest relatives of Maipure within the Arawakan languages as Yavitero and other languages of the Orinoco branch of Upper Amazon Arawakan. Aikhenvald (1999) places it instead with the Resígaro, Yucuna, Achagua, Piapoco, and Cabiyari languages in the Colombian branch of the North Amazonian languages. According to Zamponi (2003), its closest relatives are Avane, Baniwa, and Yavitero.

== Phonology ==
Any assessment about Maipure phonology is tentative due to the poor attestation of the language. A consonant and vowel system are presented below.

=== Consonants ===
Maipure consonants
| | | Bilabial | Dental | Alveolar | Palatal | Velar | Glottal |
|---|---|---|---|---|---|---|---|
| Stop | voiceless | p | t | | | k | |
| Stop | voiced | b | | | | | |
| Fricative | | | s | | | | h |
| Nasal | | m | n | | | | |
| Lateral flap | | | | ɺ | | | |
| Trill | | | | r | | | |
| Glide | | w | | | j | | |

/h/ is mentioned by Gilij, but is not attested in the available data. /r/ is phonetically long, [rː]. /t, s, n/ are classified as dental consonants due to similar realizations of these phonemes in Baniva and Yavitero.

=== Vowels ===
| | Front | | Central | | Back | |
| | plain | long | plain | long | plain | long |
|---|---|---|---|---|---|---|
| High | i | iː | | | u | uː |
| Mid | e | eː | | | u | uː |
| Low | | | a | aː | | |

/u/ is realized as either [u] or [o]. The allophone [o] occurs after unstressed /i/ or /u/, and the allophone [u] word-initially, except in the loanword and ethnonym utumáku [ot̪oˈmaku]. /e/ is presumably realized as [ɛ], as it is in Baniva and Yavitero. Long vowels are extremely rare, and only one minimal pair, pairs of words differing in only one phoneme, being /ki/ 'in it' and /kiː/ 'his foot', is attested.

== Morphosyntax ==
=== Noun phrases ===
Noun phrases (NPs) are headed by pronouns or nouns. The head may be accompanied by one or more of "adjectives, relative clauses, quantifiers, the limiter pinà 'only', numerals, demonstrative determiners, and possessor noun phrases".

==== Pronouns ====
Three classes of pronouns are present in Maipure, being personal, demonstrative, and interrogative.

===== Personal =====
Maipure uses three sets of personal pronouns, labeled as set I, II, and III. Set I pronouns consist of a cross-referencing prefix followed by /ia/ or /ja/, and occur as "topicalized subjects of intransitive, active verbs". Set II pronouns are made up of /ka/ or /ke/, apparently followed by a pronoun from set III, and may occur as either subjects of intransitive, stative verbs part of declarative clauses, non-verbal predicates part of declarative clauses, or as objects without the irrealis mood marker -macumà and the relativizing clitic -ri, or in neutral yes/no questions. Lastly, set III pronouns occur as subjects of non-verbal predicates in wh-questions, and as objects with -macumà and -ri, or in neutral yes/no questions.

Maipure personal pronouns
| | Set I | Set II | Set III |
|---|---|---|---|
| 1SG | nuja | canà | -na |
| 2SG | pìa | capì | -pi |
| 3SG.F | juja | -càu | ? |
| 3SG.NF | ìa | -chè | ∅ |
| 1PL | uaja | cavì | -vi |
| 2PL/3PL | nia | canì | ? |

===== Demonstratives =====
Maipure demonstrative pronouns are very poorly attested. They are "distingusied by proximity of the referent to the speaker, number, and gender in the singular". An example is naìa 'that one (non-feminine)'.

===== Interrogatives =====
The only attested interrogative pronoun in Maipure is ìti 'who, what'.

==== Cross-referencing ====
In Maipure, there is a set of prefixes used to cross-reference the subject in active verbs.

Cross-referencing prefixes in Maipure
| | SG | PL |
|---|---|---|
| 1SG | nu- | ua- |
| 2SG | pi- | ni- |
| 3SG.F | ju- | ni- |
| 3SG.NF | ∅ | ni- |
| impersonal | pa- | |

==== Nouns ====
Nouns in Maipure have the grammatical categories of possession, number, gender, noun class, tense, and degree.

===== Possession =====
Like in other closely related languages, Maipure has three noun classes, being inalienably possessed, alienably possessed and unpossessable nouns.

Inalienable nouns commonly use a suffix to indicate their possessed forms, and do not have a prefix for their unpossessed forms, although kinship terms must have a possessor, and a few nouns also have a suppletive form for their non-possessed form (e.g. unpossessed -èpua and possessed quata 'canoe'). They consist of nouns for body parts, plant parts, kinship terms, and nouns commonly associated with people.

Alienably possessed nouns, in contrast, mark their possession using a cross-referencing prefix and either a possessing suffix, either -re or -nè, or a vowel alternation of -V# > -e# (where # indicates a word boundary and V a wildcard symbol for any vowel) stem-finally. Unpossessed forms go unmarked always.

Unpossessable nouns include words for "harmful animals, natural phenomena, astronomical bodies, and personal names".

===== Number =====
Maipure nouns have two numbers, singular and plural. The singular number is always unmarked, and marking for plural nouns is optional. The pluralizing suffix may be -nè, -ni, -pè, and -chì.

===== Gender =====
Maipure distinguishes two genders, feminine and non-feminine. Gender is only visible in the agreement of nouns with pronouns and third-person singular prefixes. It is also thought to have been distinguished in singular demonstrative determiners. Gender is not distinguished in plural forms. For human nouns, "if not animate [nouns] in general", the gender of the noun is dependent on its sex, while inanimate nouns are non-feminine by default. Functionally, the non-feminine gender is unmarked.

pauria Pare ∅-seca-chè nuche
other Father 3SG.NF-paint/write-3SG.NF 1SG.to
'another Father wrote it (the letter) to me'

umèni ∅-menià canà ju-mà Eva
snake 3SG.NF-deceive me 3SG.F-say Eve
'"The snake deceived me," Eve said'

===== Class =====
Maipure also utilizes numeral and locative classifiers. "Numeral classifiers are used with numerals from one to three", and locative classifiers in locative adpositional phrases. No noun classifiers proper occur in Maipure, but some fossilized suffixes such as -cù 'container, cavity, hole' can be found in forms like -numacù 'mouth' and -chibucù 'head'.

===== Tense =====
Maipure expresses past tense with the morpheme -mì-, which takes a suffix expressing gender in the singular. It is unmarked in the plural.

Caravàna-mi-nè amitàmi-ca-nà-mi (Note: amitàmicanàmi 'the ghost of one who died of natural causes')
Karawana-NOM.PST-NF soul-?-human-remains
'the ghost of the late Karawana'

aràu minà-ni-mì-∅ canì urrùpu-nè
world inhabitant-PL-NOM.PST-PL they star-PL
'The stars were inhabitants (i.e. are "ex-inhabitants") of this world'

===== Degree =====
The diminutive suffix -isi 'small, little' is used to express small size in its two attestations, tiniochì-isi 'small woman', and Maipuri-isi 'small Maipure'.

== Sample text ==
Below is the Lord's Prayer translated into Maipure.

ua-kivacane eno icuti-ri pi-cania-(ca)-u ni-vià-panicà
1PL-father sky in.bounded-REL 2SG-be-CLOS-INSTR 3PL-known-OPT
'Our Father who art in heaven. May they know'

piti pi-capi-a cavi pi-naucare ike eno icuti-ri ve
2SG.name 2SG-hand-VBLZR us 2SG-dwelling to sky in.bounded-?REL as
'your name. Take us to your dwelling. As in heaven'

ua-cania-ca-u peni iati veià pi-jàsa-ri vi-ina
1PL-be-CLOS-INSTR earth on.flat as 2SG-want-REL 1PL-with
'we are on earth, as you want together with us'

pi-taa vekè yacapi uaca pacatià pi-kinanà cavi veià
2SG-give 1PL.to today 1PL.eat always 2SG-forgive us as
'Give us today the possibility to eat always. Forgive us, as'

ua-kinana-ri-ina matibe-ri cania-ca-u ua-ike nuca pi-vèka
1PL-forgive-REL-CONT be.bad-REL be-CLOS-INSTR 1PL-to NEG 2SG-let
'we are forgiving those who are bad to us. Do not let'

vasuri menià cavi pi-vèka vettuà maisuini
devil deceive us 2SG-take.away 1PL.from bad
'the devil deceive us. Take the bad (things) away from us'
