= Predicative verb =

Verbs that behave as an adjective

A predicative verb is a verb that behaves as a grammatical adjective; that is, it predicates (qualifies or informs about the properties of its argument). It is a special kind of stative verb.

Many languages do not use the present forms of the verb "to be" to separate an adjective from its noun: instead, these forms of the verb "to be" are understood as part of the adjective. Egyptian uses this structure: "my mouth is red" is written as "red my mouth" (/dSr=f r=i/). Other languages to use this structure include the Northwest Caucasian languages, the Thai language, Indonesian, the East Slavic languages, the Semitic languages, some Nilotic languages and the Athabaskan languages. Many adjectives in Chinese and Japanese also behave like this.

In the Akkadian languages, the "predicative" (also called the "permansive" or "stative") is a set of pronominal inflections used to convert noun stems into effective sentences, so that the form šarrāku is a single word more or less equivalent to either of the sentences šarrum anāku "I am king" or šarratum anāku "I am queen".
