= Polarity of gender =

Linguistic phenomenon

In linguistics, polarity of gender is when a lexical item takes the opposite grammatical gender than expected. The phenomenon is widespread in Afroasiatic languages such as Semitic and Cushitic tongues. For example, in Somali, which is a Cushitic language, plural nouns usually take the opposite gender of their singular forms.

Hebrew, a Semitic language, has a consistent polarity-of-gender agreement between nouns and simple numerals. The phenomenon is sometimes referred to as "chiastic concord" or "reverse agreement". For example, in the Hebrew noun phrase עשר בנות ‘éser banót, which means "ten girls", the numeral (ten) is masculine whereas the noun (girls) is feminine. Similarly, in the Hebrew noun phrase עשרה בנים ‘asar-á baním, which means "ten boys", the numeral (ten) is feminine whereas the noun (boys) is masculine. In the latter, the feminine suffix -a (ה) is added to the numeral עשר (ten) that modifies the masculine noun בנים (boys).

However, according to Ghil'ad Zuckermann, common usage in modern Hebrew is different in this regard. Following Yiddish (where there is no difference between a numeral modifying a masculine noun and a numeral modifying a feminine one), in most Israeli idiolects, sociolects and dialects, the numeral-noun agreement system is much simpler, and does not follow polarity of gender. In common usage (as opposed to the prescribed form by the Academy of the Hebrew Language), the expressions עשר בנות éser banót ("ten girls"), and עשר בנים éser baním ("ten boys"), are both commonly used and grammatical.

However, argues Zuckermann, due to massive puristic pressure, Israelis end up with hypercorrect forms such as shlósh-et ha-dód-ot ("the three aunts"), as opposed to the puristic shlósh ha-dod-ót.

The phenomenon happens in Portuguese with the word avós (grandparents).
