= Otomacoan languages =

Extinct language family of Venezuela

Otomakoan
- Otomaco–Taparita
- Geographic distribution: Venezuelan Llanos
- Linguistic classification: Macro-Otomakoan ?: Otomakoan
- Subdivisions: Otomaco †; Taparita †; ?Maiba †

Language codes
- Glottolog: otom1276

Otomaco and Taparita are two long-extinct languages of the Venezuelan Llanos, which comprise the Otomakoan or Otomákoan language family.

In addition to Otomaco and Taparita, Loukotka (1968) also lists Maiba (Amaygua), an unattested extinct language that was once spoken in Apure State, Venezuela between the Cunaviche River and Capanaparo River.

== Vocabulary ==
Vocabulary for Otomaco and Taparita is documented in Rosenblat (1936).
