= Taparita language =

Extinct language of Venezuela

Taparita
- Native to: Venezuela
- Region: Llanos
- Extinct: (date missing)
- Language family: Otomakoan: Taparita

Language codes
- ISO 639-3: None (mis)
- Glottolog: tapa1262

Taparita is an extinct language of the Venezuelan Llanos.
