= Otomaco language =

Extinct Otomakoan language of Venezuela

Otomako
- Otomaco
- Native to: Venezuela
- Region: Llanos
- Extinct: (date missing)
- Language family: Otomakoan: Otomako

Language codes
- ISO 639-3: None (mis)
- Glottolog: otom1301
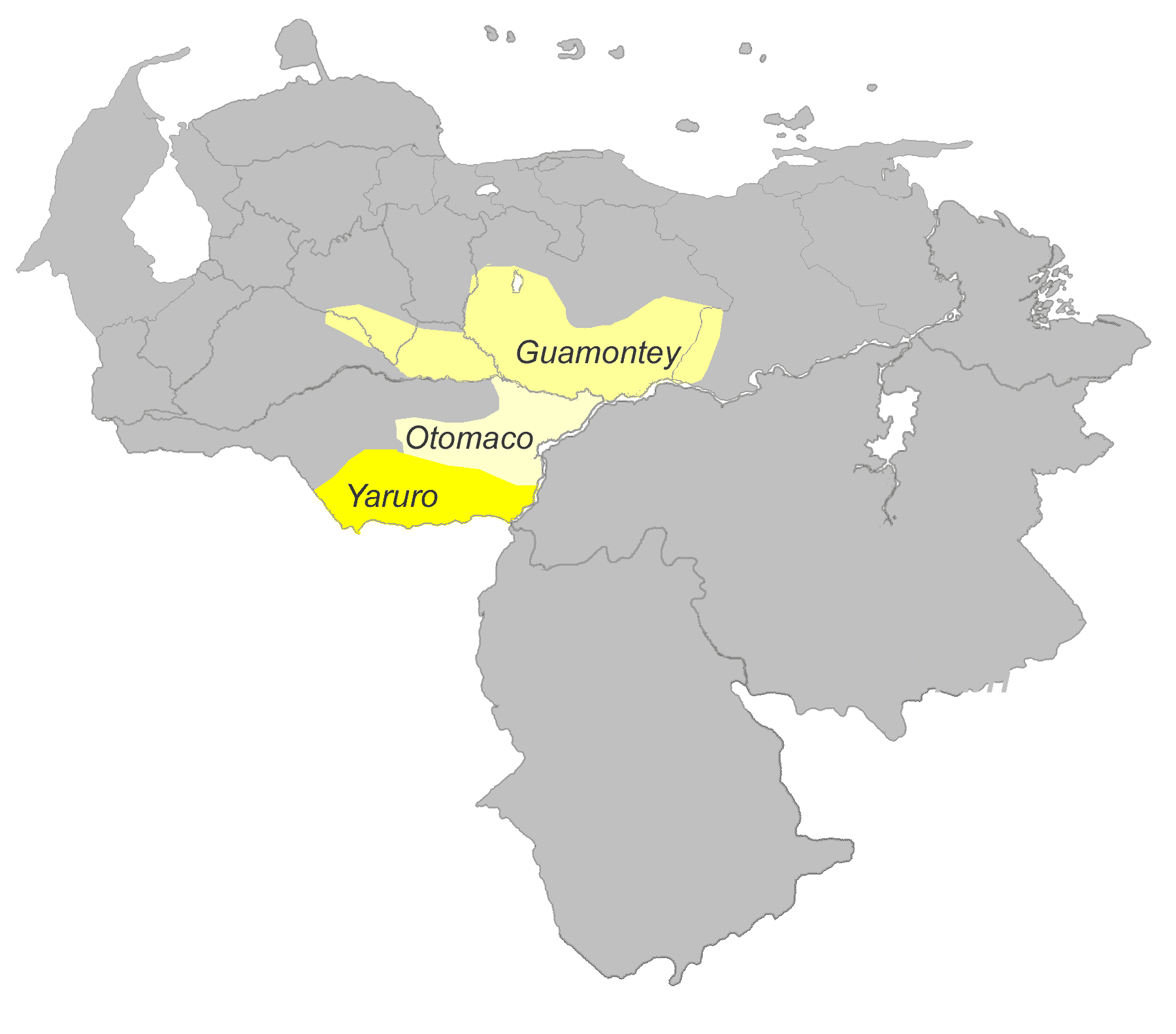
- Otomaco

Otomaco is an extinct language of the Venezuelan Llanos.

== Documentation ==
Otomaco is known only from a single wordlist manuscript written by Father Gerónimo José de Luzena in December 1788, which is currently held at the Royal Palace of Madrid Library. The word list has been analyzed in detail by Rosenblat (1936).
