= Dynamic verb =

Verb that describes a continued or progressive action

A dynamic verb is a verb that refers to continued or progressive action on the part of the subject, also known as an active verb, action verb, eventive verb or (in the study of Semitic languages) a fientive verb. (Note: The term fientive verb has a different meaning in the study of Indo-European languages, where it refers to verbs that designate entering a state, such as English "become".) This is the opposite of a stative verb.

== Overview ==
Actions denoted by dynamic verbs have duration. They occur over a span of time. This time span may or may not have a defined endpoint, and may or may not yet have occurred. These distinctions lead to various forms related to tense and aspect. For example, a dynamic verb may be said to have a durative aspect if there is not a defined endpoint or a punctual aspect if there is a defined endpoint.

Examples of dynamic verbs in English are 'to run', 'to hit', 'to intervene', 'to savour' and 'to go'.

A striking feature of modern English is its limited use of the simple present tense of dynamic verbs. Generally, the tense is required to express an action taking place in the present (I am going). The simple present usually refers to a habitual action (I go every day), a general rule (water runs downhill), a future action in some subordinate clauses (if I go) or the historical present (President signs bill). In other Germanic languages a progressive aspect of a dynamic verb is often not marked; for example, English 'I am going home' in German is simply Ich gehe nach Hause, using the present indicative.

A dynamic verb expresses a wide range of actions that may be physical (to run), mental (to ponder), or perceptual (to see), as opposed to a stative verb, which purely expresses a state in which there is no obvious action (to stand, believe, suppose etc.).

== Examples ==
=== Mayrinax Atayal ===
Dynamic verbs of the Austronesian language Mayrinax Atayal, spoken in Taiwan, are marked morphologically by specific affixes. Stative verbs in Mayrinax Atayal are marked by the prefixes /ma-/ and /∅-/, whereas the dynamic verbs are marked by the affixes /m-/ and /-um-/, as well as /ma-/ and /∅-/.

==== Dynamic verbs ====
/m-astatail/ (jump)
/l-um-aŋuy/ (swim)
/ma-βahuq/ (wash)
/∅-palatuʔ/ (swing)

==== Passive verbs ====
/m-atɣaɣaaɣ/ (lie)
/k-um-antatali/ (kneel)
/ma-ʔoway/ (be tired)
/∅-maskaiyuŋ/ (be hungry)
