= Chocñacota (Putina) =

Mountain in Peru

- Location within Peru

Highest point
- Elevation: 5,300 m (17,400 ft)
- Coordinates: 14°42′56″S 69°16′28″W

Geography
- Location: Peru, Puno Region
- Parent range: Andes, Apolobamba

Chocñacota (possibly from Aymara ch'uxña green, quta lake "green lake") is a mountain in the Apolobamba mountain range in Peru and the name of a lake near the mountain. The mountain and the lake are situated in the Puno Region, Putina Province, Ananea District, near the Bolivian border. They lie southwest and northwest of the mountains Ichocollo and Palomani.

The lake lies northwest of the mountain at 14°41′59″S 69°16′52″W.

Chocñacota is also the name of an intermittent stream which originates near the lake. It flows to the west.

== See also ==
- Chapi
- Ritipata
- Riti Urmasca
- Salluyu
