= P'isaqa =

Mountain in Bolivia

- Location within Bolivia

Highest point
- Elevation: 4,640 m (15,220 ft)
- Coordinates: 14°46′05″S 69°03′51″W

Geography
- Location: Bolivia
- Parent range: Andes

P'isaqa (Aymara and Quechua for Nothoprocta, a bird, also spelled Phisaca) is a mountain east of the Apolobamba mountain range in the Andes of Bolivia, about 4,640 metres (15,223 ft) high. It is located in the La Paz Department, Franz Tamayo Province, Pelechuco Municipality. P'isaqa lies north of the little town of Pelechuco, southeast of Rit'i Apachita and east of Puka Puka.
