= Choquechambi =

Mountain in Peru

- Location within Peru

Highest point
- Elevation: 5,000 m (16,000 ft)
- Coordinates: 14°38′18″S 69°19′39″W

Geography
- Location: Peru
- Parent range: Andes, Apolobamba

Choquechambi (possibly from Aymara chuqi gold, champi mushroom, Quechua chuqi precious metal, champi bronze, chuqichampi the name of a flower) is a mountain in the Apolobamba mountain range in Peru, about 5,000 metres (16,404 ft) high. It is situated in the Puno Region, Putina Province, on the border of the Ananea District and the Sina District. Choquechambi lies northwest of Riti Urmasca and southeast of Ritipata, Chapi and Yanauma.

Choquechambi is also the name of a river. It originates northwest of the mountain near Ritipata from where it flows to the northwest.
