= Pelechuco Municipality =

- Municipality
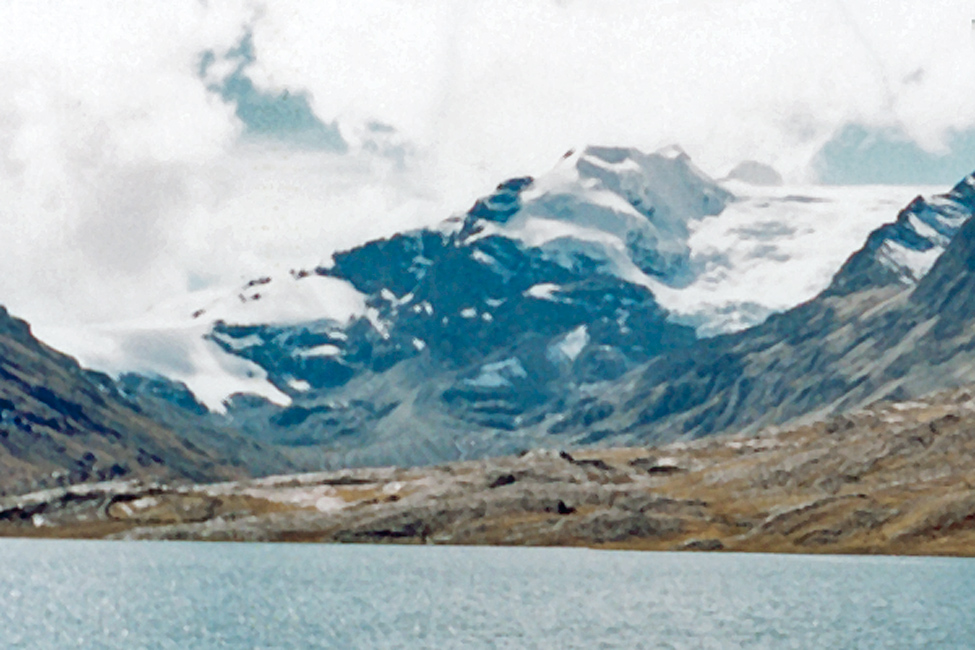
- Jach'a Waracha as seen from the west, Pelechuco Municipality

- Location of the Pelechuco Municipality within Bolivia
- Coordinates: 14°45′0″S 69°5′0″W
- Country: Bolivia
- Department: La Paz Department
- Province: Franz Tamayo Province
- Seat: Pelechuco

Government
  - Mayor: Daniel Cama Mamani (2007)
  - President: Florencio Condori Mamani (2007)

Area
  - Total: 968 sq mi (2,507 km^{2})
- Elevation: 12,800 ft (3,900 m)

Population (2001)
  - Total: 5,115
- Time zone: UTC-4 (BOT)

Pelechuco Municipality is the second municipal section of the Franz Tamayo Province in the La Paz Department, Bolivia. IN 2001 it had apopulation of 5,115. Its seat is Pelechuco.

The municipality is bordered to the north by the Apolo Municipality, to the east by the Apolo and Curva Municipalities, to the south by the Curva and Charazani Municipalities and to the west by Peru. The municipality is home to the absolute majority of the so-called Puquina indigenous people (1,845 persons out of the 1,944 Puquinas censused in Bolivia in 2024).

== Geography ==
The Apolobamba mountain range traverses the municipality. The highest mountain of the municipality is Chawpi Urqu (Wisk'achani) at 6,044 m (19,829 ft). Other mountains are listed below:

- Allqamarini
- Apachita Pura Pura
- Chawpi Urqu (Bolivia)
- Chinkani
- Ch'amakani
- Ch'usiqani
- Jach'a Waracha
- Jichu Qullu
- Kulli Pata
- Khunuyu
- Machu Such'i Qhuchi
- Palumani
- Puka Puka
- Punta Yawri
- P'isaqa
- Qala Phusa
- Q'umir Pata
- Rit'i Apachita
- Salluyu
- Supay Punku
- Ulla Qhaya
- Wanakuni
- Wank'uchiri
- Waracha
- Yawa Yawa

== Division ==
Pelechuco Municipality is subdivided into the following four cantons:

- Antaquilla de Copacabana - 964 inhabitants (2001)
- Pelechuco - 2,756 inhabitants
- Suches - 227 inhabitants
- Ulla Ulla - 1,168 inhabitants

== Places of interest ==
Some of the tourist attractions of the municipality are:

- Katantica, one of the most important peaks of the Apolobamba mountain range, about 5,592 m high, in Pelechuco Canton
- the colonial town of Pelechuco
- the village of Queara near Pelechuco which is also situated in the highest area of Madidi National Park
- the Ulla Ulla National Reserve in Ulla Ulla Canton which today is part of the Apolobamba Integrated Management Natural Area
- the pre-Hispanic Guanan ruins in Pelechuco Canton
- Cololo Lake in Antaquilla de Copacabana Canton
- Suches Lake on the border to Peru

== See also ==
- K'ayrani Quta
- K'iski Quta
- Pelechuco River
