= Chinkani =

Mountain in Bolivia

- Location within Bolivia

Highest point
- Elevation: 4,600 m (15,100 ft)
- Coordinates: 14°38′05″S 69°07′59″W

Geography
- Location: Bolivia
- Parent range: Andes

Chinkani (chinka a type of water plant, Aymara -ni a suffix to indicate ownership, "the one with the chinka plant", also spelled Chincani) is a mountain east of the Apolobamba mountain range in the Andes of Bolivia, about 4,600 metres (15,092 ft) high. It is located in the La Paz Department, Franz Tamayo Province, Pelechuco Municipality. Chinkani lies northeast of the mountain Allqamarini and east of Q'umir Pata at a small lake and river named Quchapata (Khochapata).
