= Puka Puka (La Paz) =

Mountain in Bolivia

- Location within Bolivia

Highest point
- Elevation: 4,840 m (15,880 ft)
- Coordinates: 14°46′21″S 69°04′49″W

Geography
- Location: Bolivia
- Parent range: Andes

Puka Puka (Quechua puka red, the reduplication indicates that there is a group or a complex of something, "a complex of red color", also spelled Puca Puca) is a mountain east of the Apolobamba mountain range in the Andes of Bolivia, about 4,840 m (15,880 ft). It is located in the La Paz Department, Franz Tamayo Province, Pelechuco Municipality, north of Pelechuco. It lies west of P'isaqa and southeast of Rit'i Apachita.
