= Yanauma =

Mountain in Peru

- Location within Peru

Highest point
- Elevation: 5,009 m (16,434 ft)
- Coordinates: 14°37′41″S 69°19′45″W

Geography
- Location: Peru, Puno Region
- Parent range: Andes, Apolobamba

Yanauma (Aymara yana black, dirty, stained, uma water, "black (or dirty) water", or Quechua yana black, uma face, "black face") is a 5,009-metre-high (16,434 ft) mountain in the Apolobamba mountain range in the Andes of Peru. It is situated in the Puno Region, Putina Province, on the border of the districts of Ananea and Sina. Yanauma lies northwest of the Riti Urmasca, north of Choquechambi, east of Chapi and southeast of Ritipata.
