= Wank'uchiri =

Mountain in Bolivia

- Location within Bolivia

Highest point
- Elevation: 5,382 m (17,657 ft)
- Coordinates: 14°46′37″S 69°12′58″W

Geography
- Location: Bolivia
- Parent range: Andes, Apolobamba

Wank'uchiri (Aymara wanq'u, wank'uchi guinea pig, -(i)ri a suffix, also spelled Huancuchiri, Huanchuchiri, Huanchochiri, Huanchuchuri) is a 5,382-metre-high (17,657 ft) mountain in the Apolobamba mountain range in the Andes of Bolivia. It is located in the La Paz Department, Franz Tamayo Province, Pelechuco Municipality, near the Peruvian border. Wank'uchiri is situated southwest of the mountain Chuquyu, northwest of K'iski Quta and southeast of Palumani and Such'i Lake. A little lake named Saywa Quta (Saihuacota) lies at its feet, south of it.
