= Ch'usiqani =

Mountain in Bolivia

- Location within Bolivia

Highest point
- Elevation: 4,260 m (13,980 ft)
- Coordinates: 14°33′58″S 69°06′28″W

Geography
- Location: Bolivia
- Parent range: Andes

Ch'usiqani (Aymara ch'usiqa (barn) owl,-ni a suffix to indicate ownership, "the one with the owl (or owls)", also spelled Chusekani) is a mountain northeast of the Apolobamba mountain range in the Andes of Bolivia, about 4,260 metres (13,976 ft) high. It is located in the La Paz Department, Franz Tamayo Province, in the north of the Pelechuco Municipality. Ch'usiqani lies near the Peruvian border, west of Yawa Yawa and southeast of Chawpi Wayq'u.
