= Peperomia vestita =

Scientific classification
- Kingdom: Plantae
- Clade: Tracheophytes
- Clade: Angiosperms
- Clade: Magnoliids
- Order: Piperales
- Family: Piperaceae
- Genus: Peperomia
- Species: P. vestita

Binomial name
- Peperomia vestita C.DC.

Species of epiphyte

Peperomia vestita is a species of epiphyte from the genus Peperomia. It was discovered by Casimer de Candolle in 1898.

== Etymology ==
Vestita came from the Latin word "vestitus". Vestitus means clothed, referring to the tomentose vestiture.

== Distribution ==
Peperomia vestita is endemic to Bolivia.

- Bolivia
  - La Paz
    - Franz Tamayo
      - Madidi National Park
      - Apolo
    - Inquisivi
    - Sud Yungas
    - Nor Yungas
  - Santa Cruz
    - Florida
      - Bermejo
  - Cochabamba
    - Ayopaya

== Description ==
It has long petiole leaves with an oblong-pointed base, obtuse tips on both sides, densely haired on both sides, and central nerves sending 4-5 nerves on both sides. Catkins are arranged in a pinnacle at the tip of the stem themselves than shorter and very short-pedunculated leaves, they have circular leaves, a broad leaf ovary at the base, and shortly narrowed at the long-right tip and unequal.

== Subtaxa ==
These subtaxa are accepted.

- Peperomia vestita var. lindenii Rauh
- Peperomia vestita var. vestita
