= Sorapata =

Mountain in Peru

- Location within Bolivia

Highest point
- Elevation: 6,000 m (20,000 ft)
- Coordinates: 14°37′59″S 69°13′43″W

Geography
- Location: Bolivia–Peru border
- Parent range: Andes, Apolobamba

Sorapata (possibly from Aymara sura dry jiquima, a species of Pachyrhizus, pata step, "sura step") is a mountain in the north of the Apolobamba mountain range on the border of Bolivia and Peru. It is about 6,000 metres (19,685 ft) high. On the Bolivian side it is located in the La Paz Department, Franz Tamayo Province, Pelechuco Municipality, and on the Peruvian side it lies in the Puno Region, Putina Province, Sina District. Sorapata is situated between Locopauchenta and Cunuyo in the north and Chaupi Orco (or Viscachani) in the south. The lake Japucocha lies southwest of it.
