= Huanacuni =

Mountain in Bolivia

Wanakuni
- Location within Bolivia

Highest point
- Elevation: 5,796 m (19,016 ft)
- Coordinates: 14°51′S 69°10′W

Geography
- Location: Bolivia, La Paz Department, Franz Tamayo Province
- Parent range: Andes, Apolobamba mountain range

Huanacuni (possibly from Aymara wanaku, wanaqu guanaco) is a mountain in the Apolobamba mountain range in the Bolivian Andes, about 5,796 metres (19,016 ft) high. It is situated in the La Paz Department, Franz Tamayo Province, Pelechuco Municipality, east of Cololo Lake and northwest of Qala Phusa (Cololo).

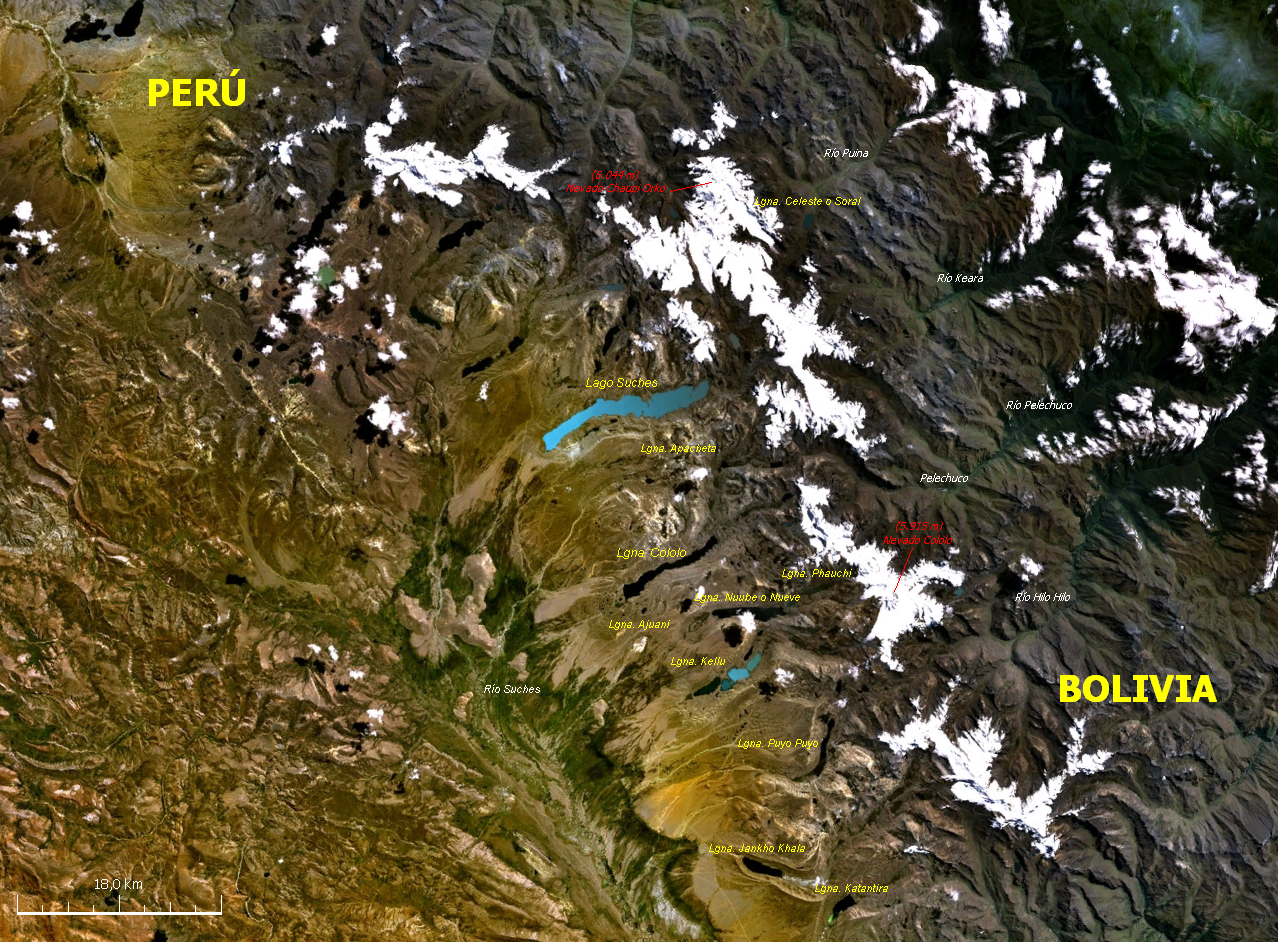
Map of the Apolobamba mountain range showing Cololo Lake. Wanakuni lies east of it and northwest of Qala Phusa (Cololo).

== See also ==
- Jach'a Waracha
- Machu Such'i Qhuchi
- List of mountains in the Andes
