= Yawa Yawa =

Mountain in Peru

- Location within Bolivia

Highest point
- Elevation: 4,600 m (15,100 ft)
- Coordinates: 14°33′46″S 69°08′14″W

Geography
- Location: Bolivia–Peru border
- Parent range: Andes

Yawa Yawa (Aymara yawa a spear without iron, the reduplication indicates that there is a group or a complex of something, "a complex of spears", also spelled Yagua Yagua) is a mountain northeast of the Apolobamba mountain range at the border of Bolivia and Peru. It is about 4,600 metres (15,092 ft) high. On the Bolivian side it is located in the La Paz Department, Franz Tamayo Province, Pelechuco Municipality, and on the Peruvian side it lies in the Puno Region, Putina Province, Sina District. Yawa Yawa is situated south of the mountain Ch'amakani and northeast of Punta Yawri. Yawa Yawa is also the name of a little lake near the mountain.
