= Punta Yavre =

Mountain in Peru

- Location within Bolivia

Highest point
- Elevation: 4,600 m (15,100 ft)
- Coordinates: 14°34′46″S 69°11′09″W

Geography
- Location: Bolivia–Peru border
- Parent range: Andes, Apolobamba

Punta Yavre or Punta Yayre (possibly from Quechua punta peak; ridge, yawri a big needle, Aymara yawri copper) is a mountain in the northeast of the Apolobamba mountain range on the border of Bolivia and Peru. It is about 4,600 metres (15,092 ft) high. On the Bolivian side it is located in the La Paz Department, Franz Tamayo Province, Pelechuco Municipality, and on the Peruvian side it lies in the Puno Region, Putina Province, Sina District. Punta Yavre is situated northwest and northeast of the mountains Chawpi Urqu and Kulli Pata.

A little river named Janq'u Qala (Aymara for "white stone", Janlocala) originates near the lake Uqi Qucha (Quechua for "grey lake", Okhe Khocha) east the mountain. It flows to the south. One of the small lakes south of Punta Yavre is Juqhun Punta (Jucun Punta).
