= Ch'amakani (Bolivia-Peru) =

Mountain in Peru

- Location within Bolivia

Highest point
- Elevation: 4,600 m (15,100 ft)
- Coordinates: 14°33′07″S 69°08′35″W

Geography
- Location: Bolivia–Peru border
- Parent range: Andes

Ch'amakani (Aymara ch'amaka dark, darkness, -ni a suffix to indicate ownership, "the one with dark color", also spelled Chamacane) is a mountain northeast of the Apolobamba mountain range at the border of Bolivia and Peru. It is about 4,600 metres (15,092 ft) high. On the Bolivian side it is located in the La Paz Department, Franz Tamayo Province, Pelechuco Municipality, and on the Peruvian side it lies in the Puno Region, Putina Province, Sina District. Ch'amakani is situated south of the mountain Yanaqucha, west of Chawpi Wayq'u and north of Yawa Yawa.
