= Huejo (Puno) =

Mountain in Peru

- Location within Peru

Highest point
- Elevation: 4,900 m (16,100 ft)
- Coordinates: 14°37′12″S 69°17′32″W

Geography
- Location: Peru
- Parent range: Andes, Apolobamba

Huejo or Huecco (possibly from Aymara for a corner in a house, a mountain cove) is a mountain in the Apolobamba mountain range in Peru, about 4,900 metres (16,076 ft) high. It is situated in the Puno Region, Putina Province, Sina District. Huejo lies north of the mountain Riti Urmasca.
