= Losojocha =

Mountain in Peru

- Location within Peru

Highest point
- Elevation: 5,338 m (17,513 ft)
- Coordinates: 14°35′43″S 69°14′34″W

Geography
- Location: Peru, Puno Region
- Parent range: Andes, Apolobamba

Losojocha or Losoccocha (possibly from Quechua qucha lake) is a 5,338-metre-high (17,513 ft) mountain in the Apolobamba mountain range in the Andes of Peru. It is located in the Puno Region, Putina Province, Sina District. Losojocha lies southwest of Locopauchenta, west of Cunuyo and northwest of Sorapata. It is near the Lusuni pass at the border with Bolivia.
