= Palomani =

Mountain in Peru

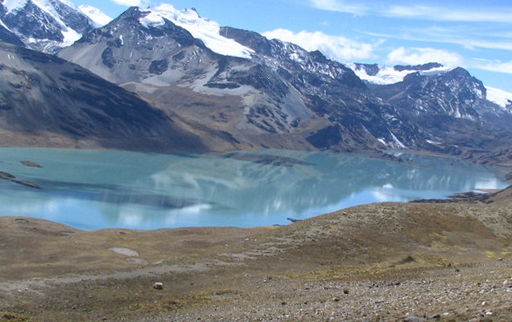
- The southern slope of Palumani (on the left) behind Suches Lake as seen from the southeast

Highest point
- Elevation: 5,723 m (18,776 ft)
- Coordinates: 14°43′03″S 69°14′31″W

Geography
- Location within Bolivia
- Location: Bolivia–Peru border
- Parent range: Andes, Apolobamba

Palomani (possibly from Aymara, urpi, paluma dove, "the one with a dove (or doves)") is a mountain in the Apolobamba mountain range on the border of Bolivia and Peru. It reaches a height of about 5,723 metres (18,776 ft). On the Bolivian side it is located in the La Paz Department, Franz Tamayo Province, Pelechuco Municipality, and on the Peruvian side it lies in the Puno Region, Putina Province, Ananea District. It is situated north of Suches Lake. Palomani is south of Chaupi Orco (or Viscachani), Salluyu and Jichu Qullu, near Chocñacota in the west.

Adventure travel companies have offered guided tours to the area, including Andes Tours UK.
