= Cololo Lake =

Lake in the La Paz Department in Bolivia

- Location within Bolivia Location within South America
- Interactive map of Cololo Lake
- Location: La Paz Department
- Coordinates: 14°52′S 69°15′W
- Basin countries: Bolivia
- Surface area: 5.2 km^{2} (2.0 sq mi)
- Surface elevation: 4,538 m (14,888 ft)

Cololo Lake (Spanish: Laguna Cololo) is a lake in the Apolobamba mountain range in the La Paz Department in Bolivia. It is situated in the Antaquilla de Copacabana Canton of the Pelechuco Municipality in the Franz Tamayo Province at an elevation of 4,538 m at a distance of about 20 km north west from the Cololo mountain. Its surface area is 5.2 km^{2}.

== See also ==
- Machu Such'i Qhuchi
- Jach'a Waracha
- Wanakuni
