= Kulli Pata =

Mountain in Bolivia

- Location within Bolivia

Highest point
- Elevation: 4,800 m (15,700 ft)
- Coordinates: 14°36′39″S 69°11′52″W

Geography
- Location: Bolivia, La Paz Department, Franz Tamayo Province, Pelechuco Municipality
- Parent range: Andes, Apolobamba

Kulli Pata or Kullipata (Quechua, kulli a color between blue and carmine (purple, violet, mulberry-colored), pata elevated place; above, at the top; edge, bank (of a river), shore, ""purple or violet elevated place") is a mountain in the north of the Apolobamba mountain range in Bolivia, about 4,800 metres (15,748 ft) high. It is located in the La Paz Department, Franz Tamayo Province, Pelechuco Municipality, near the Peruvian border. Kulli Pata lies west of Chawpi Urqu and northeast of Surapata.

== See also ==
- Q'umir Pata
