= Putina (town) =

- Town
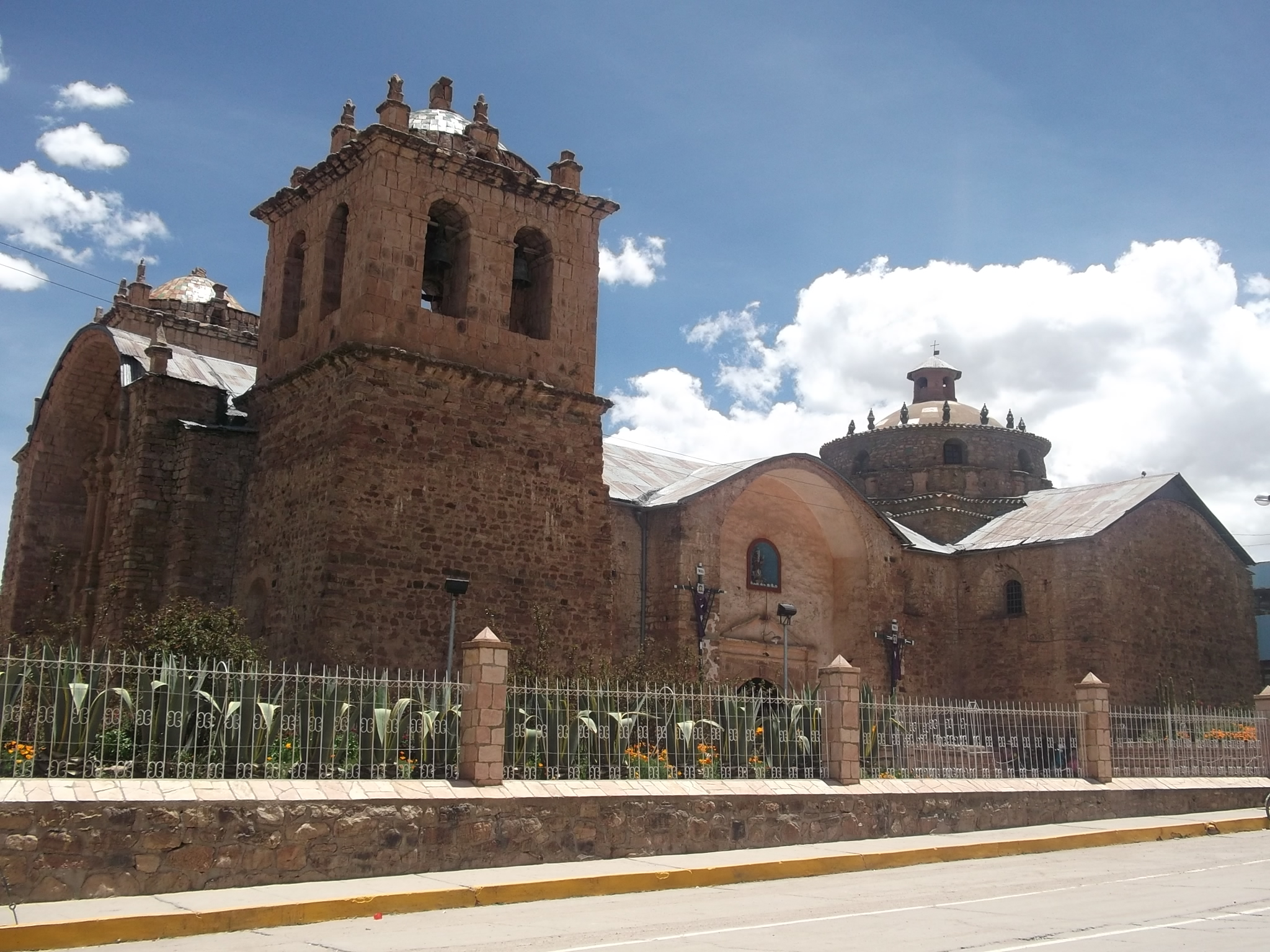

- Location within Peru
- Coordinates: 14°54′50″S 69°52′25″W
- Country: Peru
- Region: Puno
- Province: San Antonio de Putina
- District: Putina

Government
  - Mayor (Alcalde): Alex Max Sullca Cáceres (2007-2010)
- Elevation: 3,878 m (12,723 ft)
- Website: http://usuarios.lycos.es/putinaalmundo/

Putina is a town in southern Peru, capital of the province San Antonio de Putina in the region Puno.

In Quechua, the word "Putina" means boiling water.

It was founded on May 24, 1595.

== Climate ==
Putina has a very atypical, subtropical highland climate (Köppen climate classification Cwb/Cwc) bordering very closely on an alpine tundra climate (ETH) with constant cool to cold temperatures throughout the entire year. The average annual precipitation is 622 millimetres or 24.5 inches. "Winters" are dry with freezing nights and mornings, and pleasant afternoon temperatures.

Climate data for Putina, elevation 3,861 m (12,667 ft), (1991–2020)
Month	Jan	Feb	Mar	Apr	May	Jun	Jul	Aug	Sep	Oct	Nov	Dec	Year
Mean daily maximum °C (°F)	16.4 (61.5)	16.3 (61.3)	16.7 (62.1)	17.2 (63.0)	17.5 (63.5)	17.3 (63.1)	17.1 (62.8)	18.0 (64.4)	18.3 (64.9)	18.4 (65.1)	18.7 (65.7)	17.3 (63.1)	17.4 (63.4)
Daily mean °C (°F)	10.1 (50.2)	10.2 (50.4)	9.9 (49.8)	9.3 (48.7)	7.7 (45.9)	5.9 (42.6)	5.9 (42.6)	6.9 (44.4)	8.7 (47.7)	9.8 (49.6)	10.4 (50.7)	10.4 (50.7)	8.8 (47.8)
Mean daily minimum °C (°F)	3.8 (38.8)	4.1 (39.4)	3.1 (37.6)	1.4 (34.5)	−2.2 (28.0)	−5.1 (22.8)	−5.3 (22.5)	−4.3 (24.3)	−0.9 (30.4)	1.1 (34.0)	2.0 (35.6)	3.5 (38.3)	0.1 (32.2)
Average precipitation mm (inches)	125.4 (4.94)	108.8 (4.28)	94.7 (3.73)	43.6 (1.72)	10.1 (0.40)	4.6 (0.18)	3.4 (0.13)	9.1 (0.36)	21.1 (0.83)	53.9 (2.12)	52.0 (2.05)	95.3 (3.75)	622 (24.49)
Source: National Meteorology and Hydrology Service of Peru
