= Apolo Municipality =

- Municipality
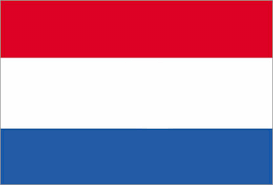
- Flag

- Location of the Apolo Municipality within Bolivia
- Coordinates: 14°30′0″S 68°15′0″W
- Country: Bolivia
- Department: La Paz Department
- Province: Franz Tamayo Province
- Seat: Apolo

Government
  - Mayor: Alejandro Huanca Gemio (2007)
  - President: Felix Oblitas Garcia (2007)

Area
  - Total: 5,321 sq mi (13,781 km^{2})
- Elevation: 4,600 ft (1,400 m)

Population (2001)
  - Total: 13,271
  - Ethnicities: Quechua
- Time zone: UTC-4 (BOT)

Apolo Municipality is the first municipal section of the Franz Tamayo Province in the La Paz Department, Bolivia. Its seat is Apolo.

Apolo Municipality is bordered to the east by Beni Department, San Buenaventura and Palos Blancos Municipalities, to the west by Peru and Pelechuco Municipality, to the north by Ixiamas and San Buenaventura Municipalities and to the south by Teoponte, Guanay, Mapiri and Charazani Municipalities.

== Division ==
Apolo Municipality is subdivided into the following five cantons:

- Apolo - 6,951 inhabitants (2001)
- Atén - 3,573 inhabitants
- Mojos - 56 inhabitants
- Pata - 454 inhabitants
- Santa Cruz del Valle Ameno - 2,141 inhabitants

== Places of interest ==
Some of the tourist attractions of the municipalities are:

- San Juan de Asariamas dry forest in Apolo Canton. The dominant trees species are the Bilka (Anadenanthera macrocarpa), the Cuchi (Astronium urundeuva), and the Brazilian Soto (Schinopsis brasiliensis).
- Machariapo River in Apolo Canton situated within Madidi National Park and Area of Integrated Management
- the Inca bridge in Santa Teresa community and the Chiara Alto waterfall of 18 m height in Apolo Canton
- the community of Pata, its old church and the Sillakunka tunnel in Pata Canton
- the valley of the community of Virgen del Rosario, also named Tuichi, in Pata Canton at the shores of Tuichi River
- the community of Santa Cruz del Valle Ameno, the Billipiza waterfall of 22 m height in Vaquería and the archaeological site near Inca Viewpoint in Santa Cruz del Valle Ameno Canton
- Trinity festivity (Santísima Trinidad) in the community of Atén
- the pre-Columbian trails
- Turiapo River and its waterfall in the community of Pucasucho
- Ayara waterfall of about 18 m height in the community of Munaypatac
