= Apachita Pura Pura =

Mountain in Bolivia

- Location within Bolivia

Highest point
- Elevation: 5,360 m (17,590 ft)
- Coordinates: 14°43′28″S 69°9′06″W

Geography
- Location: Bolivia, La Paz Department
- Parent range: Andes, Apolobamba

Apachita Pura Pura (Aymara and Quechua apachita the place of transit of an important pass in the principal routes of the Andes; name in the Andes for a stone cairn, a little pile of rocks built along the trail in the high mountains, Aymara pura pura Xenophyllum (or a species of it), also spelled Apacheta Pura Pura) is a mountain in the Apolobamba mountain range in Bolivia, about 5,360 metres (17,585 ft) high. It is situated in the La Paz Department, Franz Tamayo Province, Pelechuco Municipality, northwest of the mountain Rit'i Apachita and southeast of Chuquyu.
