= Sina District =

Coordinates: 14.5013°S 69.5749°W

Sina
- District
- Location of Sina in the San Antonio de Putina Province
- Country: Peru
- Region: Puno
- Province: San Antonio de Putina
- Founded: May 2, 1854
- Capital: Sina

Government
  - Mayor: Ricardo Flores Hilasaca

Area
  - Total: 163.43 km^{2} (63.10 sq mi)
- Elevation: 3,229 m (10,594 ft)

Population (2007 census)
  - Total: 1,472
  - Density: 9.007/km^{2} (23.33/sq mi)
- Time zone: UTC-5 (PET)
- UBIGEO: 211005

Sina District is one of five districts of the San Antonio de Putina Province in the Puno Region of Peru.

== Geography ==
The Apolobamba mountain range traverses the district. The highest peaks of the district is Chawpi Urqu at 6,044 m (19,829 ft) above sea level which is also the highest elevation of the range. Other mountains are listed below:

- Chapi
- Chuqichampi
- Ch'amakani
- Kuntur Sayana
- Khunuyu
- Luqhu Phawchinta
- Lusuqucha
- Llantayuq
- Punta Yawri
- Qhuna Kunka
- Rit'i Urmasqa
- Rit'iyuq
- Tarujani
- Waylla Tira
- Wiqu
- Yana Uma
- Yanaqucha
- Yawa Yawa

== History ==
Sina District was created on May 2, 1854.

== Ethnic groups ==
The people in the district are mainly indigenous citizens of Quechua descent. Quechua is the language which the majority of the population (80.79%) learnt to speak in childhood, 15.54% of the residents started speaking using the Spanish language (2007 Peru Census).

== Mayors ==
- 2011-2014: Ricardo Flores Hilasaca.
- 2007-2010: Marcial Huanca Mamani.

== Festivities ==
- Candlemas, the Feast of the Purification of the Virgin.
- Cross of May
