= Putina District =

Coordinates: 14.9139°S 69.8736°W

Putina
- District
- Interactive map of Putina
- Country: Peru
- Region: Puno
- Province: San Antonio de Putina
- Capital: Putina

Government
  - Mayor: Uriel Lama

Area
  - Total: 1,021.92 km^{2} (394.57 sq mi)
- Elevation: 3,878 m (12,723 ft)

Population (2005 census)
  - Total: 16,024
  - Density: 15.680/km^{2} (40.612/sq mi)
- Time zone: UTC-5 (PET)
- UBIGEO: 211001

Putina District is one of five districts of the San Antonio de Putina Province in Peru.

== Geography ==
One of the highest peaks of the district is Tarujani at approximately 4,600 m (15,100 ft). Other mountains are listed below:

- Allqamarini
- Ch'iqu Rumi
- Ch'iyar Uya
- Hatun Salla
- Hatun Tarujani
- Huch'uy Urqu
- Inka Kancha
- Janq'u
- Janq'u K'ark'a
- Jichu Pichini
- Kimsa Pukara
- Kiwuta
- Kuntur Ikiña
- Kuntur Sayana
- Kuntur Thamaña
- Kuntur Wachana
- Kunturani
- Laramani
- Laqayani
- Lisani
- Parinani
- Pillunani
- Pirwa
- Pukara
- Puka Kancha
- Puka Kunka
- Puka Urqu
- Pupusani
- Pusi K'ark'a
- Qala Qala
- Qillqa
- Qullpa
- Qullpa Tira
- Q'ulini
- Saywayuq
- Sipin Tuqu
- Sirasirani
- Sura Tira
- Sura Uqhu
- Surani
- Taku Kunka
- Tarujani
- Tuquni
- Wanqa Wanqani
- Wanqarani
- Waraq Pata
- Waraq Tira
- Waxrani
- Wayna Putus
- Wila Muqu
- Wila Qutaña
- Wisk'achani
- Yawri Minas
- Yuraq Qaqa

== History ==
Putina District was created in 1824.

== Ethnic groups ==
The people in the district are mainly indigenous citizens of Quechua descent. Quechua is the language which the majority of the population (67.02%) learnt to speak in childhood, 32.09% of the residents started speaking using the Spanish language (2007 Peru Census).

== Climate ==
Climate data for Putina, elevation 3,861 m (12,667 ft), (1991−2020)
Month	Jan	Feb	Mar	Apr	May	Jun	Jul	Aug	Sep	Oct	Nov	Dec	Year
Mean daily maximum °C (°F)	16.4 (61.5)	16.3 (61.3)	16.7 (62.1)	17.2 (63.0)	17.5 (63.5)	17.3 (63.1)	17.1 (62.8)	18.0 (64.4)	18.3 (64.9)	18.4 (65.1)	18.7 (65.7)	17.3 (63.1)	17.4 (63.4)
Mean daily minimum °C (°F)	3.8 (38.8)	4.1 (39.4)	3.1 (37.6)	1.4 (34.5)	−2.2 (28.0)	−5.1 (22.8)	−5.3 (22.5)	−4.3 (24.3)	−0.9 (30.4)	1.1 (34.0)	2.0 (35.6)	3.5 (38.3)	0.1 (32.2)
Average precipitation mm (inches)	125.4 (4.94)	108.8 (4.28)	94.7 (3.73)	43.6 (1.72)	10.1 (0.40)	4.6 (0.18)	3.4 (0.13)	9.1 (0.36)	21.1 (0.83)	53.9 (2.12)	52.0 (2.05)	95.3 (3.75)	622 (24.49)
Source: National Meteorology and Hydrology Service of Peru

== Mayors ==
- 2011-2014: Agustin Uriel Lama Quispe.
- 2007-2010: Alex Max Sullca Cáceres.

== Festivities ==
- June: Anthony of Padua.

== See also ==
- Administrative divisions of Peru
