= Machu Such'i Qhuchi =

Mountain in Bolivia

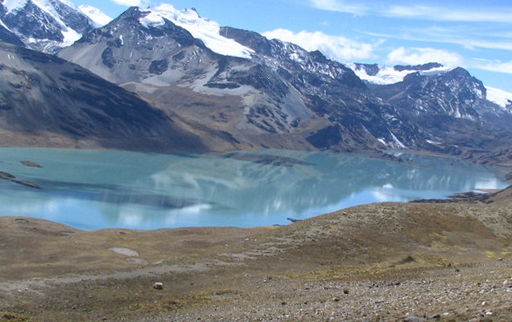
- Machu Such'i Qhuchi (on the right) behind Such'i Lake as seen from the southeast

Highest point
- Elevation: 5,723 m (18,776 ft)
- Coordinates: 14°45′S 69°12′W

Geography
- Location within Bolivia
- Location: Bolivia; La Paz Department, Franz Tamayo Province
- Parent range: Andes, Apolobamba mountain range

Machu Such'i Qhuchi or Machu Such'i Q'uchi (a combination of Quechua and Aymara, machu old, such'i a species of pencil catfish, qhuchi or q'uchi wetlands "old such'i wetlands", Hispanicized spellings Machu Suchi Cuchi, Matchu Suchi Cuchi, Machu Suchi Coochi, Matchu Sochi Conchi) is a mountain in the Apolobamba mountain range in the Bolivian Andes, about 5,679 metres (18,632 ft) high. It is situated near the Peruvian border in the La Paz Department, Franz Tamayo Province, Pelechuco Municipality, east of Such'i Lake.

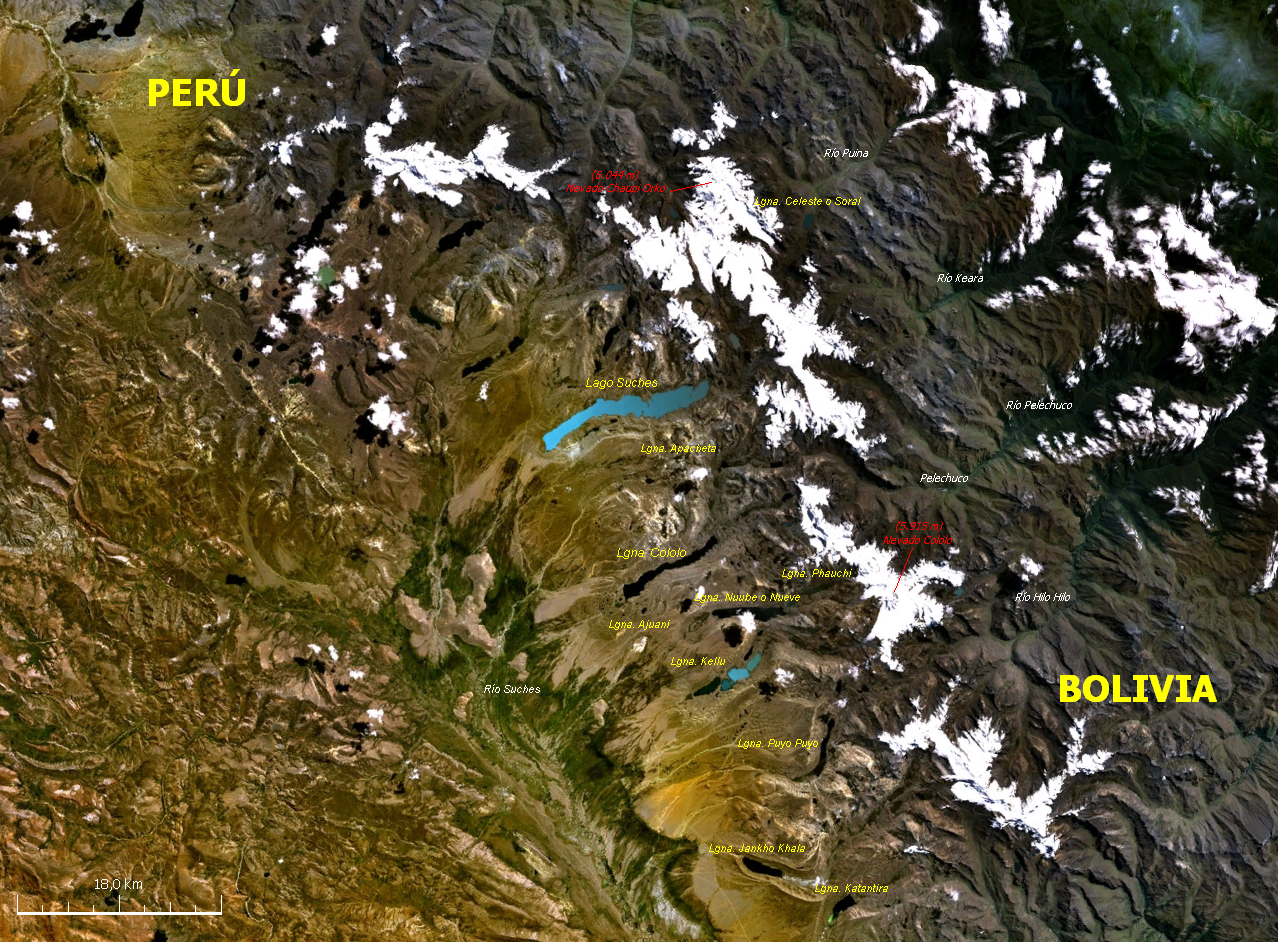
Map of the Apolobamba mountain range showing Lake Suches. Machu Such'i Qhuchi is situated east of it.

== See also ==
- Jach'a Waracha
- Cololo Lake
- Wanakuni
- List of mountains in the Andes
