= Apolo Airport =

- IATA: APB; ICAO: SLAP

Summary
- Airport type: Public
- Serves: Apolo, Bolivia
- Elevation AMSL: 4,642 ft / 1,415 m
- Coordinates: 14°44′10″S 68°24′40″W

Map
- Location of Apolo Airport in Bolivia

Runways
Direction	Length		Surface
Direction	m	ft	Surface
15/33	1,300	4,265	Grass
- Source: Landings.com Google Maps GCM

Apolo Airport (IATA: APB, ICAO: SLAP) is an airstrip serving Apolo, a town in the La Paz Department of Bolivia.

Apolo is in a wide valley of the Cordillera Real range, and there is mountainous terrain in all quadrants except north-northwest. The Apolo non-directional beacon (Ident: APB) is located on the field.

== See also ==
- Transport in Bolivia
- List of airports in Bolivia
