= Waracha =

Mountain in Bolivia

- Location within Bolivia

Highest point
- Elevation: 5,419 m (17,779 ft)
- Coordinates: 14°52′14″S 69°4′40″W

Geography
- Location: Bolivia, La Paz Department, Franz Tamayo Province, Pelechuco Municipality
- Parent range: Andes, Apolobamba

Waracha (Aymara for wooden camp bed, Hispanicized spelling Huaracha) is a 5,419-metre-high (17,779 ft) mountain in the Apolobamba mountain range in Bolivia. It is situated in the La Paz Department, Franz Tamayo Province, Pelechuco Municipality. Waracha lies east of the mountain Jach'a Waracha and north-east of Qala Phusa.
