= K'ayrani Quta =

Lake in La Paz Department, Bolivia

- Location within Bolivia Location within South America
- Interactive map of K'ayrani Quta
- Location: Bolivia, La Paz Department
- Coordinates: 15°00′58″S 69°09′42″W

K'ayrani Quta (Aymara k'ayra frog, quta lake, -ni a suffix to indicate ownership, "the lake with a frog (or frogs)", also spelled Kairani Kkota) is a lake west of the Apolobamba mountain range in the Andes of Bolivia. It is situated in the La Paz Department, Franz Tamayo Province, Pelechuco Municipality.
