= Ichocollo (Bolivia-Peru) =

Mountain in Peru

- Location within Bolivia

Highest point
- Elevation: 5,423 m (17,792 ft)
- Coordinates: 14°41′01″S 69°15′32″W

Geography
- Location: Bolivia – Peru border
- Parent range: Andes, Apolobamba

Ichocollo or Ichucollo (possibly from Aymara jichu ichhu (Peruvian feather grass), qullu mountain) is a mountain in the Apolobamba mountain range at the border of Bolivia and Peru, about 5,423 metres (17,792 ft) high. According to the Bolivian IGM (Instituto Geográfico Militar) map and a map edited by the Peruvian Ministry of Education it is located in the La Paz Department, Franz Tamayo Province, Pelechuco Municipality, near 14°41′57″S 69°14′55″W. According to reports of mountaineers, however, its position is more to the west on the Peruvian border of the Puno Region, Putina Province, Ananea District, near 14°41′30″S 69°15′30″W. This information is based on a DAV (Deutscher Alpenverein) map of 1957.

Statements about the height of Ichocollo also vary considerably.
