= K'iski Quta =

Lake in Bolivia

- Location within Bolivia Location within South America
- Interactive map of K'iski Quta
- Location: Bolivia, La Paz Department
- Coordinates: 14°48′10″S 69°11′10″W

K'iski Quta (Aymara k'iski narrow, quta lake, "narrow lake", also spelled Quisquikota) is a lake in the Apolobamba mountain range in the Andes of Bolivia. It is situated in the La Paz Department, Franz Tamayo Province, Pelechuco Municipality. K'iski Quta lies northwest of the mountain Jach'a Waracha.
