= Chawpi Urqu (Bolivia) =

Mountain in Bolivia

- Location within Bolivia

Highest point
- Elevation: 4,617 m (15,148 ft)
- Coordinates: 14°36′30″S 69°10′32″W

Geography
- Location: Bolivia, La Paz Department, Franz Tamayo Province, Pelechuco Municipality
- Parent range: Andes, Apolobamba

Chawpi Urqu (Quechua, chawpi central, middle, urqu mountain, "central mountain", also spelled Chaupi Orko) is a 4,617-metre-high (15,148 ft) mountain in the Apolobamba mountain range in Bolivia. It is located in the La Paz Department, Franz Tamayo Province, Pelechuco Municipality, near the Peruvian border. Chawpi Urqu lies east of the mountains Surapata and Kulli Pata and north of Q'umir Pata.
