= Vicuña =

Conservation status
- Least Concern (IUCN 3.1)
- CITES Appendix I (Note: Except populations of Argentina (populations of provinces of Jujuy, Salta, and Catamarca and semi-captive populations of provinces of Jujuy, Salta, Catamarca, La Rioja, and San Juan), Chile (populations of the region of Tarapacá and of the region of Arica and of the region of Parinacota), Ecuador (whole population), Peru (whole population), and the Plurinational State of Bolivia (whole population), which are included in Appendix II.)

Scientific classification
- Kingdom: Animalia
- Phylum: Chordata
- Class: Mammalia
- Order: Artiodactyla
- Family: Camelidae
- Genus: Lama
- Species: L. vicugna

Binomial name
- Lama vicugna (Molina, 1782)
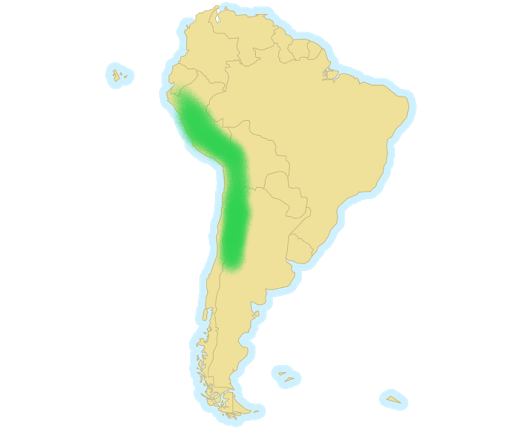
- native range

Synonyms
- Vicugna vicugna (Molina, 1782); Lama gracilis? Gervais & Ameghino, 1881

Wild South American camelid

The vicuña (Lama vicugna) or vicuna (both /vɪˈkuːnjə/, very rarely spelled vicugna, its Latin specific name) is a wild South American camelid which lives in high alpine areas of the Andes. It is a relative of the llama, the domesticated descendant of the guanaco, the only other still wild South American camelid.

The vicuña is believed to be the ancestor of domesticated alpaca, which is raised for its coat. The vicuña produces small amounts of extremely fine wool, which is very expensive because the animal has to be caught from the wild to be fleeced and can only be shorn every three years. When knitted together, the product of the vicuña's wool is very soft and warm. The Inca valued the vicuña highly for its wool, and it was prohibited for anyone but royalty to wear vicuña garments; today, the vicuña is the national animal of Peru and appears on the Peruvian coat of arms.

Both under the rule of the Inca and today, the vicuña has been protected by law, but it was heavily hunted in the intervening period. Only about 6,000 animals were left when it was declared endangered in 1974. Today, the vicuña population has recovered to about 350,000, and although conservation organizations have reduced its level of threat classification, they still call for active conservation programs to protect populations from poaching, habitat loss, and other threats.

Previously, the vicuña was not considered domesticated, and the llama and the alpaca were regarded as descendants of the closely related guanaco. However, DNA research published in 2001 demonstrated that the alpaca may have vicuña parentage. Today, the vicuña is mainly wild, but the local people still perform special rituals with these creatures, including a fertility rite.

== Description ==
The vicuña is smaller, more delicate, and considered gracile than the guanaco. A key distinguishing element of morphology is the better-developed incisor roots for the guanaco. The vicuña's long, woolly coat is tawny brown on the back, whereas the hair on the throat and chest is white and quite long. Its head is slightly shorter than guanaco's, and the ears are slightly longer. The length of the head and body ranges from 1.45 to 1.60 m (about 5 ft); shoulder height is from 75 to 85 cm (around 3 ft); its weight is from 35 to 65 kg (under 150 lb).

== Taxonomy and evolution ==
There are two subspecies of vicuña:

- Lama vicugna vicugna
- Lama vicugna mensalis

While vicuñas are restricted to the more extreme elevations of the Andes in modern times, they may have also been present in the lowland regions of Patagonia as much as 3500 km south of their current range during the Late Pleistocene and Early Holocene. Fossils of these lowland camelids have been assigned to a species known as Lama gracilis, but genetic and morphological analysis between them and modern vicuña indicate the two may be the same.

== Distribution and habitat ==
Currently, vicuñas are restricted to South America's central Andes. They are found in Peru, northwestern Argentina, Bolivia, and northern Chile. A smaller, introduced population lives in central Ecuador. However, fossil remains indicate that they were also found as far as Uruguay and the Straits of Magellan until the early Holocene, together with the related guanaco.

Vicuñas live at altitudes of 3,200 to 4,800 m (10,500–15,700 ft). They feed in the daytime on the grassy plains of the Andes Mountains but spend the nights on the slopes. In these areas, only nutrient-poor, tough, bunch grasses and Festuca grow. The sun's rays can penetrate the thin atmosphere, producing relatively warm temperatures during the day; however, the temperatures drop to freezing at night. The vicuña's thick but soft coat is a unique adaptation that traps layers of warm air close to its body to tolerate freezing temperatures.

Chief predators include pumas, culpeos and domestic dogs .

== Behavior ==
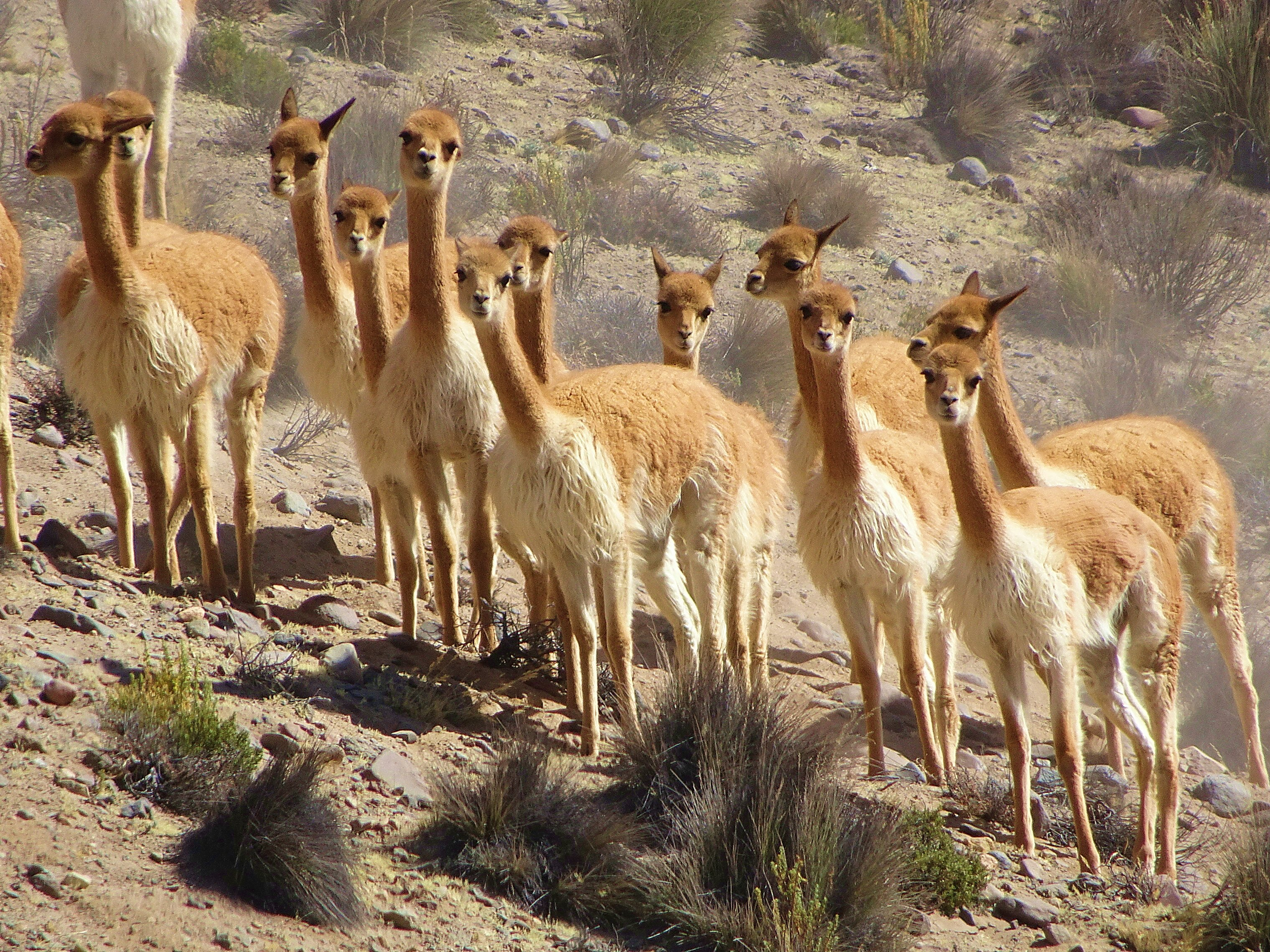
Herd of vicuñas near Arequipa, Peru

The behavior of vicuñas is similar to that of the guanacos. They are timid animals and are easily aroused by intruders due, among other things, to their extraordinary hearing. Like the guanacos, they frequently lick calcareous stones and rocks, which, together with salt water, is its source of salt. Vicuñas are clean animals and always deposit their excrement in the same place. Their diets consist mainly of low grasses which grow in clumps on the ground.

Vicuñas live in family-based groups of a male, 5 to 15 females, and their young. Each group has its territory of about 18 km^{2} (6.9 sq mi), which can fluctuate depending on food availability.

Mating usually occurs in March–April. After a gestation about 11 months, the female gives birth to a single fawn, which is nursed for about ten months. The fawn becomes independent at about 12 to 18 months old. Young males form bachelor groups, and the young females search for a sorority to join. This deters intraspecific competition and inbreeding.

== Conservation ==
Parties to the 1979 Vicuña Convention

Until 1964, hunting of the vicuña was unrestricted, which reduced its numbers to only 6,000 in the 1960s. As a result, the species was declared endangered in 1974, and its status prohibited the trade of vicuña wool. In Peru, during 1964–1966, the Servicio Forestal y de Caza in cooperation with the US Peace Corps, Nature Conservancy, World Wildlife Fund, and the National Agrarian University of La Molina established a nature conservatory for the vicuña called the Pampa Galeras – Barbara D'Achille in Lucanas Province, Ayacucho. During that time, a game warden academy was held in Nazca, where eight men from Peru and six from Bolivia were trained to protect the vicuña from poaching.

To cooperate on the conservation of the vicuña, the governments of Bolivia and Peru signed the Convention for the Conservation of the Vicuña on 16 August 1969 in La Paz, explicitly leaving the treaty open to accession by Argentina and Chile. Ecuador acceded on 11 February 1976. The Convention prohibited their international trade and domestic exploitation, and ordered the parties to create reserves and breeding centres. A follow-up treaty, the Convention for the Conservation and Management of the Vicuña, was signed between Bolivia, Chile, Ecuador and Peru on 20 December 1979 in Lima. It explicitly allowed only Argentina to sign it if it also signed the 1969 La Paz Convention (Article 12; Argentina joined in 1981), and did not allow other countries to accede to the convention 'due to its specific character' (Article 13). The 1979 Convention did allow the use of the vicuña under strict circumstances if the animal population had recovered sufficiently. In combination with CITES (effective in 1975), as well as USA and EU trade legislation, the Conventions were highly successful, as the vicuña population substantially grew as a result.

The estimated population in Peru was 66,559 in 1994, 103,161 in 1997, 118,678 in 2000, and 208,899 in 2012. Currently, the community of Lucanas conducts a chaccu (herding, capturing, and shearing) on the reserve each year to harvest the wool, organized by the National Council for South American Camelids (CONACS).

In Bolivia, the Ulla Ulla National Reserve (now the Apolobamba Integrated Management Natural Area) was designatured as a UNESCO biosphere in 1977, partly as a sanctuary for the species. Their numbers grew to 125,000 in Peru, Chile, Argentina, and Bolivia. Since this was a ready "cash crop" for community members, the countries relaxed regulations on vicuña wool in 1993, enabling its trade once again. The wool is sold on the world market for over $300 per kg. In 2002, the US Fish and Wildlife Service reclassified most populations as threatened, but still lists Ecuador's population as endangered. While the population levels have recovered to a healthy level, poaching remains a constant threat, as do habitat loss and other threats. Consequently, the IUCN still supports active conservation programs to protect vicuñas, though they lowered their status to least concern in 2018.

In 2015, French luxury group LVMH said that "Loro Piana saved the species." The Italian company has been criticized for underpaying local communities collecting the wool. In 2022, the Argentine government's National Council for Scientific and Technical Investigation estimated that "Andean communities receive around 3% of the value generated by the vicuña fiber chain."

== Vicuña wool ==
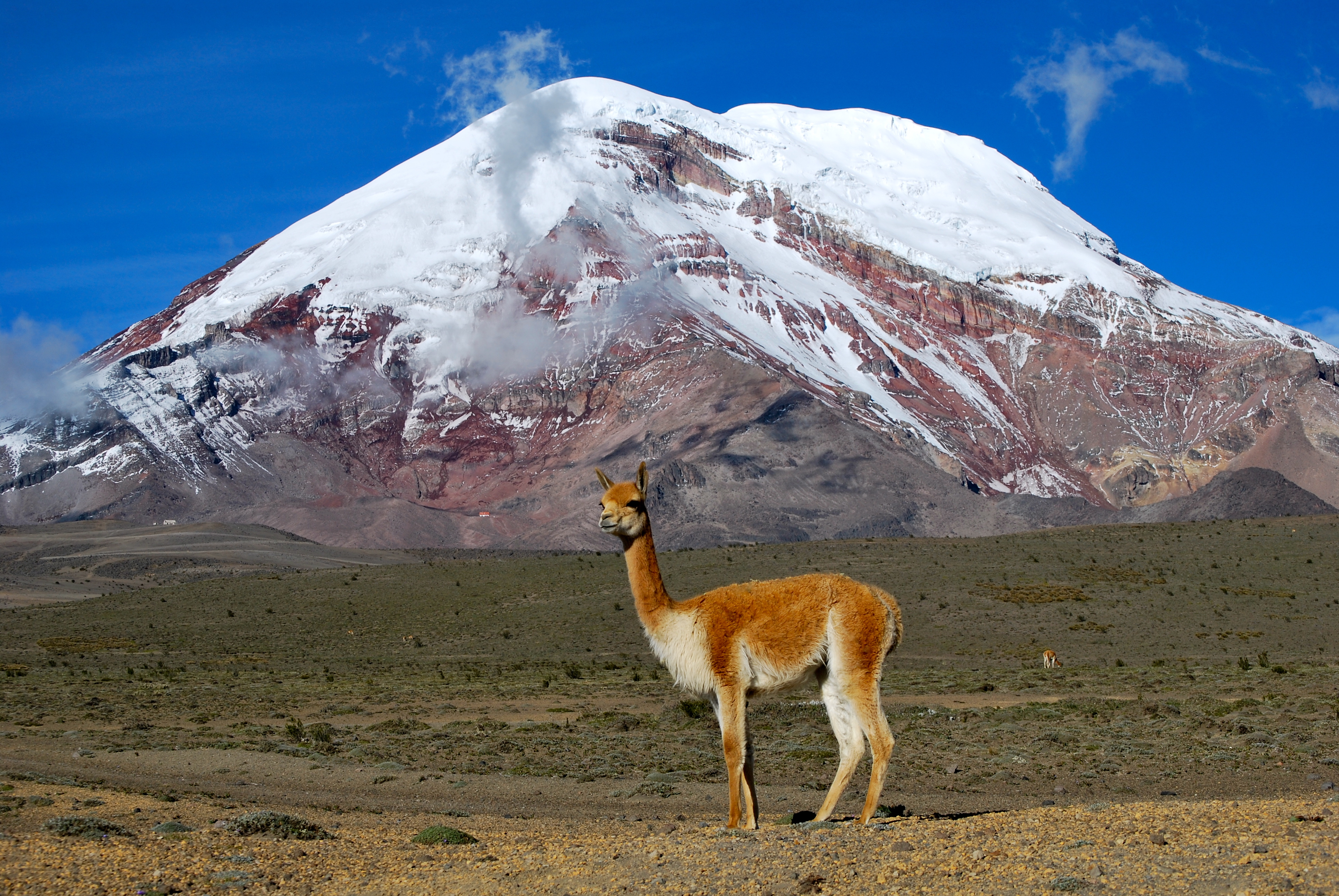
Vicuña near Chimborazo in Ecuador

Vicuña wool is famous for its warmth and is used for apparel, such as socks, sweaters, accessories, shawls, coats, suits, and home furnishings, such as blankets and throws. Its properties come from the tiny scales on the hollow, air-filled fibres, which causes them to interlock and trap insulating air. Vicuñas have some of the finest fibers in the world, at a diameter of 12 μm. The fiber of cashmere goats is 14 to 19 μm, while angora rabbit is 8 to 12 μm, and that of shahtoosh from the Tibetan antelope, or chiru, is from 9 to 12 μm.

== Gallery ==
Vicuña in the coat of arms of Peru

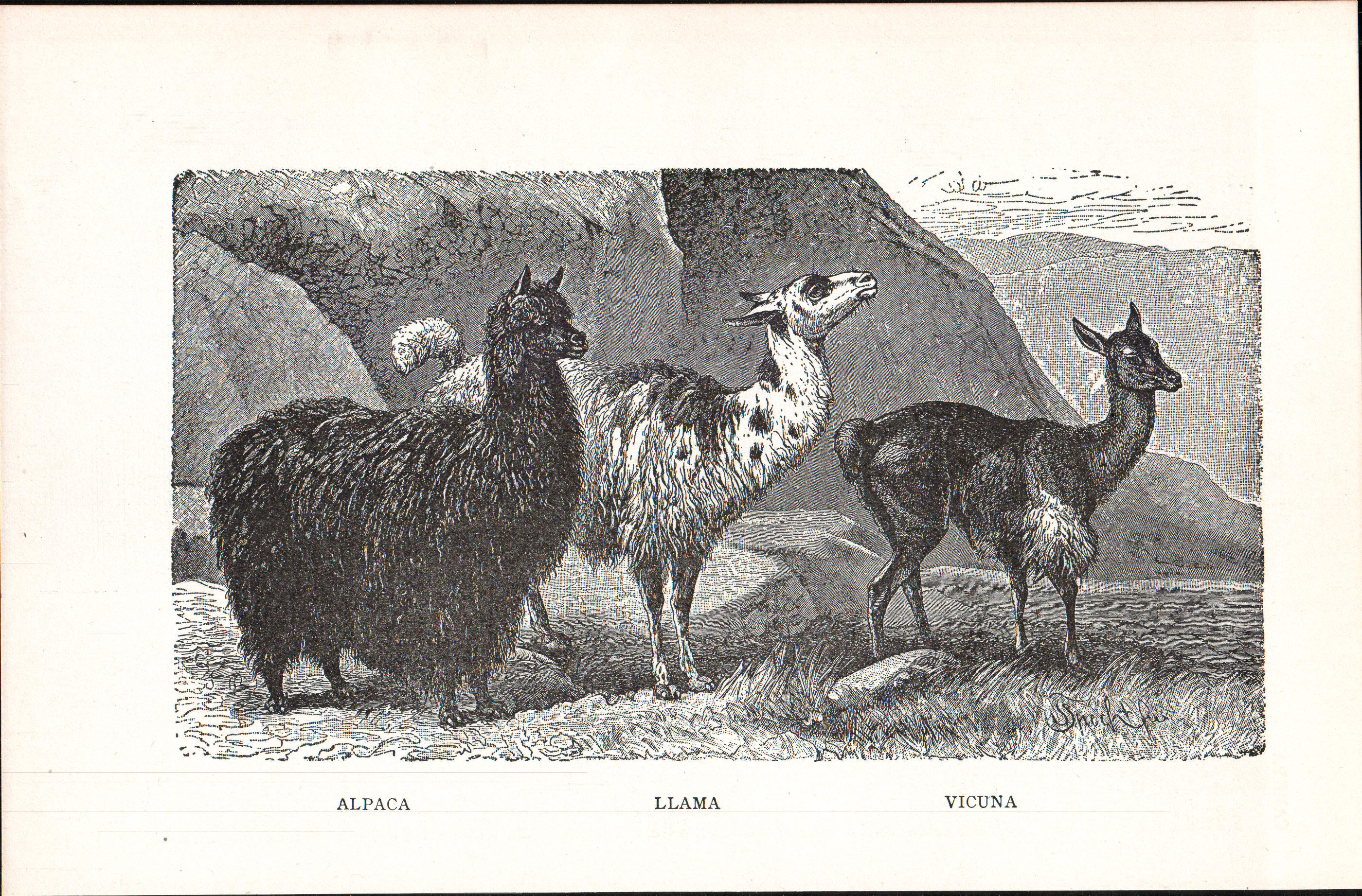
Comparison of alpaca, llama, and vicuña (1914)

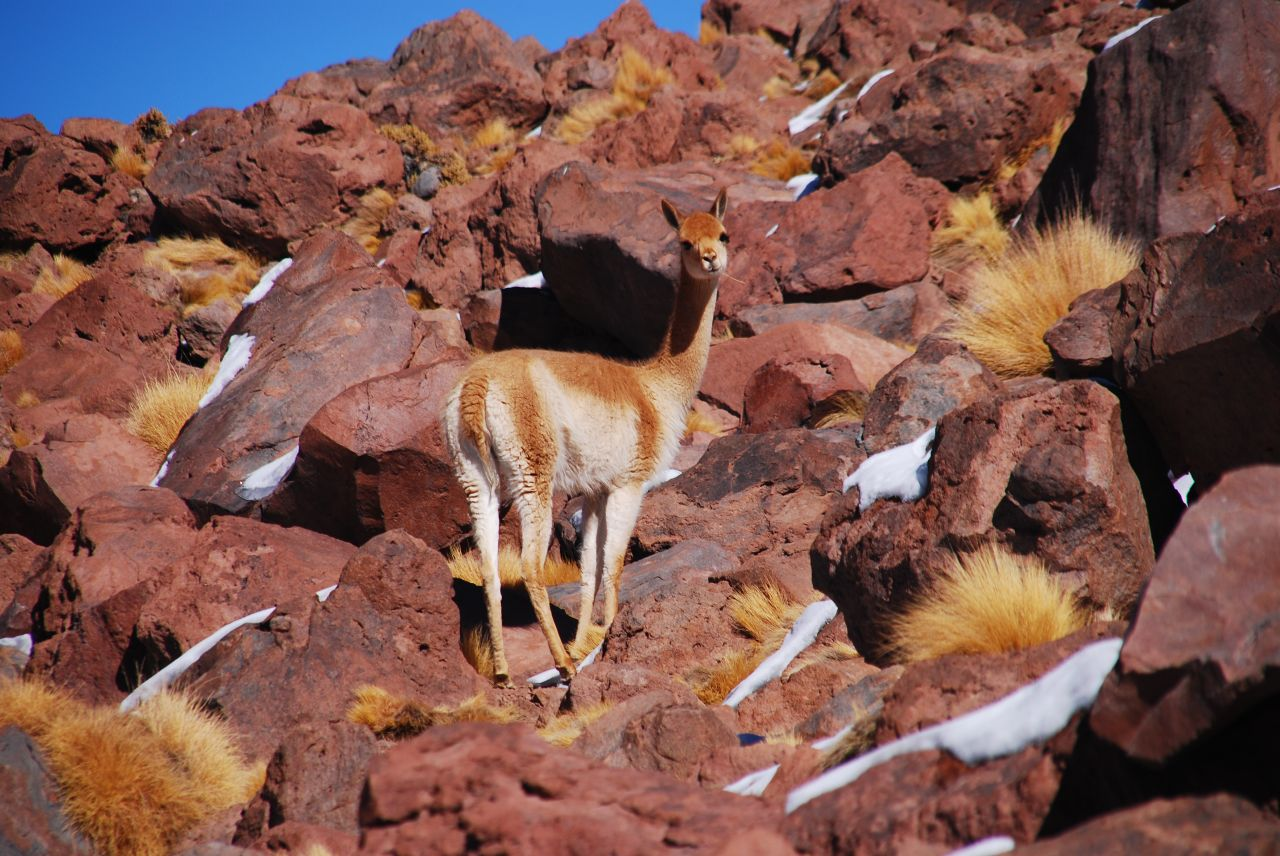
A vicuña on rocky terrain (2008)

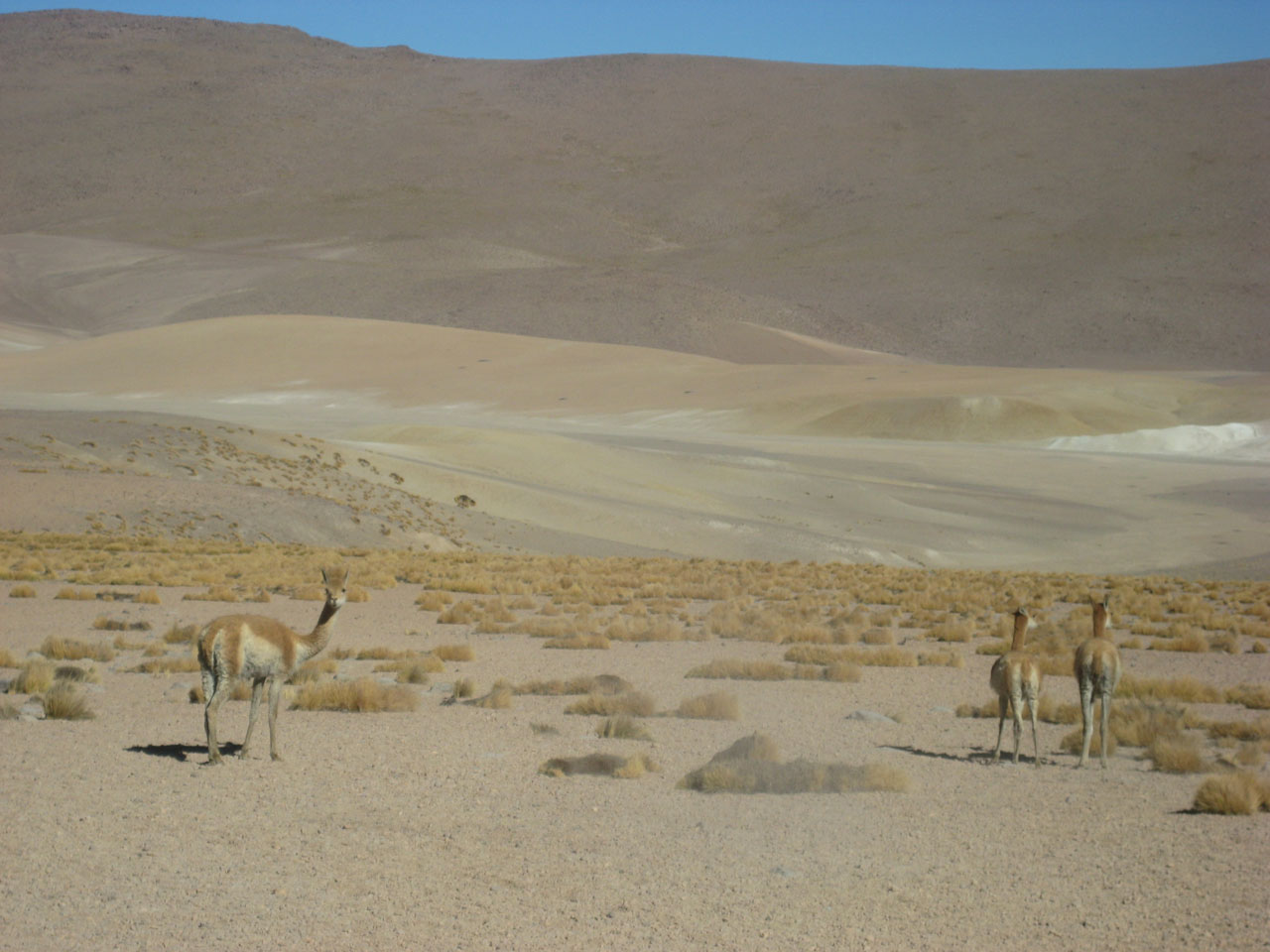
Vicuñas near El Tatio geysers, San Pedro de Atacama, Antofagasta Region, Chile (2011)

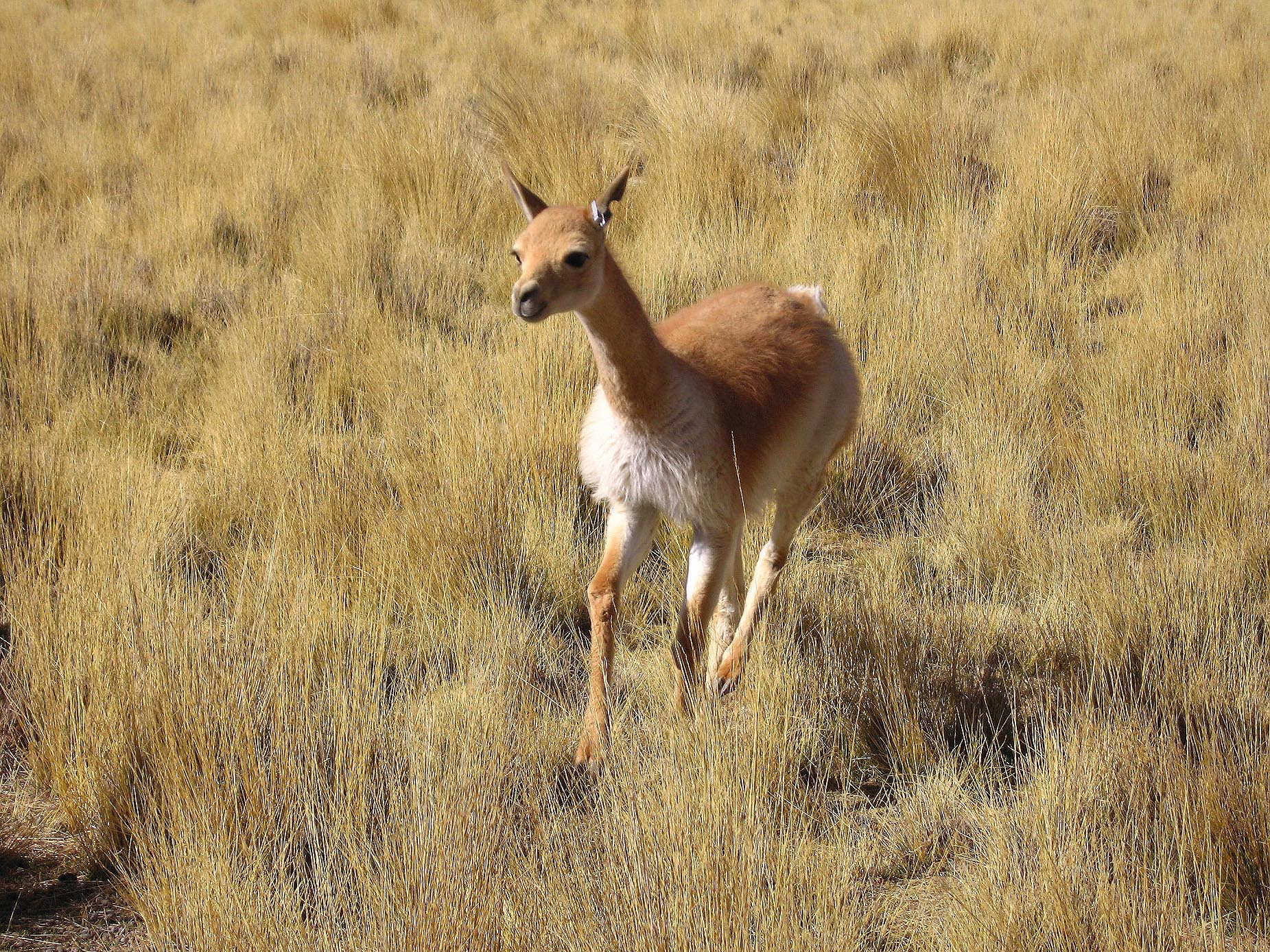
Vicuña in Jujuy Province in the Argentine Altiplano (2011)

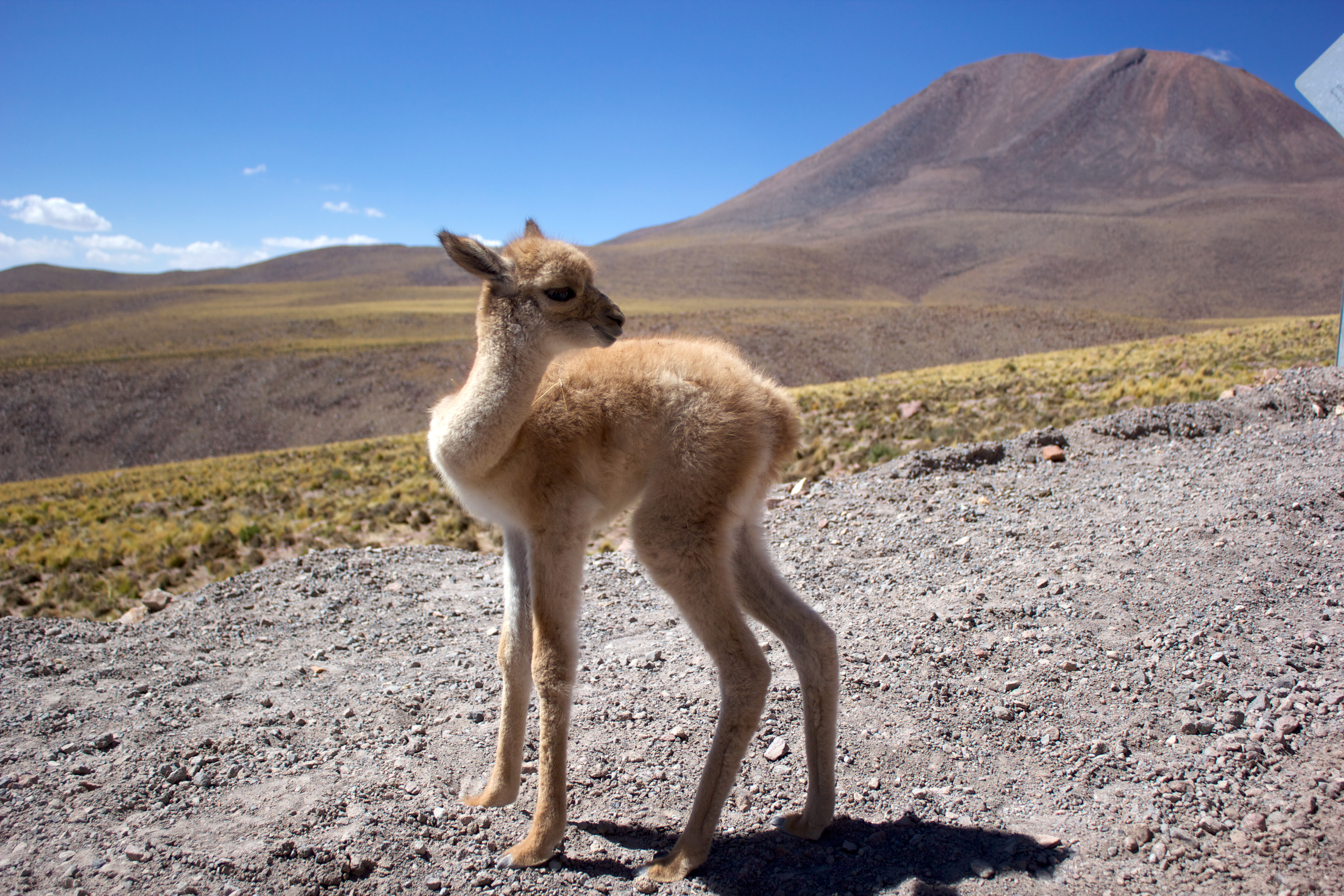
Vicuña fawn in the Atacama Desert (2014)

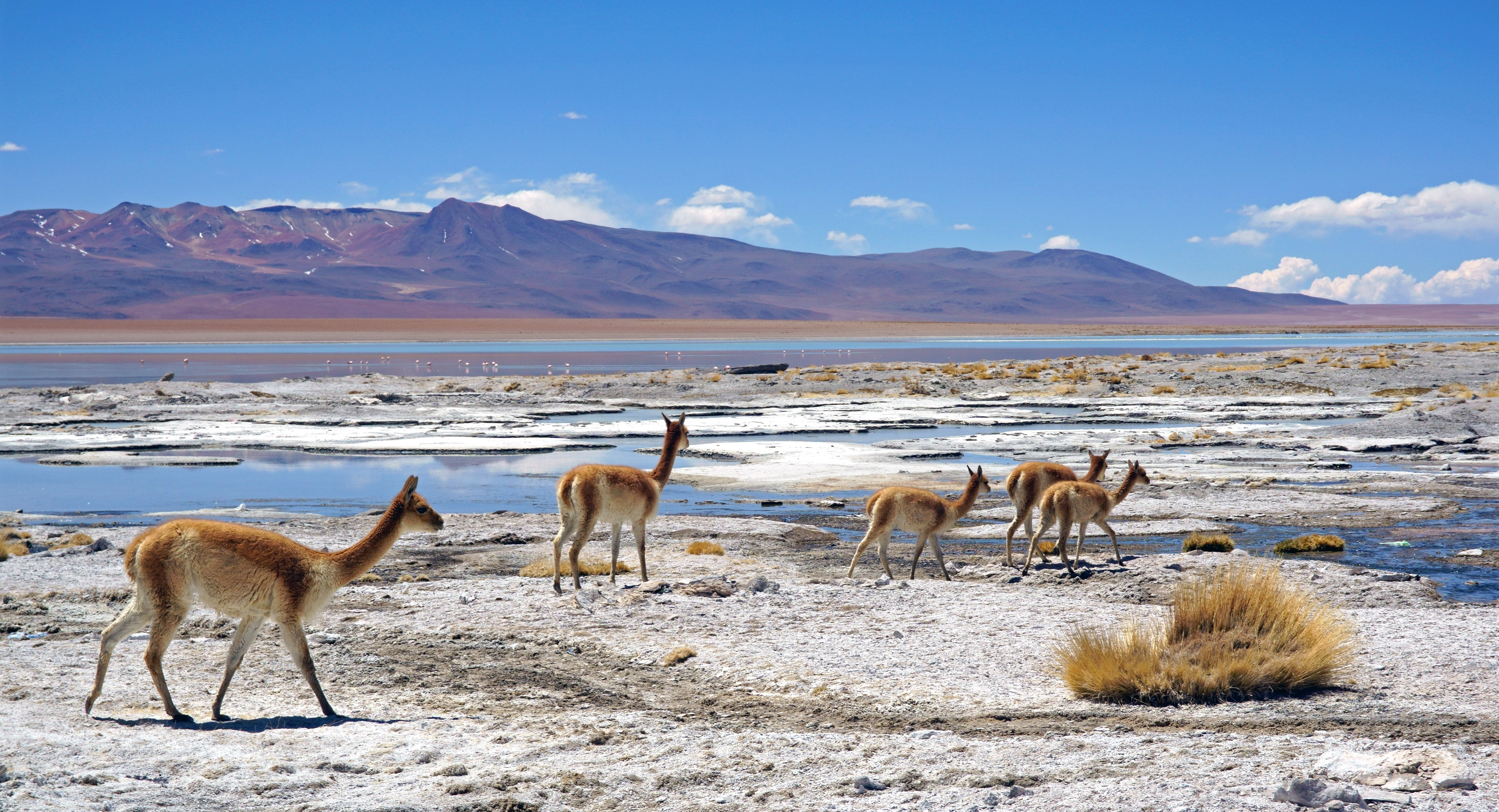
Vicunas in Salar de Chalviri, Bolivia
