= Q'umir Pata =

Mountain in Bolivia

- Location within Bolivia

Highest point
- Elevation: 4,720 m (15,490 ft)
- Coordinates: 14°37′46″S 69°10′34″W

Geography
- Location: Bolivia, La Paz Department, Franz Tamayo Province, Pelechuco Municipality
- Parent range: Andes, Apolobamba

Q'umir Pata (Quechua, q'umir green, pata elevated place / above, at the top / edge, bank (of a river), shore, "green elevated place" or "green shore", also spelled Khomerpata) is a mountain in the north of the Apolobamba mountain range in Bolivia, about 4,720 metres (15,486 ft) high. It is located in the La Paz Department, Franz Tamayo Province, Pelechuco Municipality, near the Peruvian border. Q'umir Pata lies southeast of the mountains Surapata and Kulli Pata and south of Chawpi Urqu.
