= Apolo, La Paz =

Apolo
- Interactive map of Apolo
- Coordinates: 14°43′00″S 68°25′03″W
- Country: Bolivia
- Department: La Paz Department
- Province: Franz Tamayo Province
- Municipality: Apolo Municipality
- Canton: Apolo Canton

Population (2001)
  - Total: 2,123
- Time zone: UTC-4 (BOT)
- Climate: Cfb

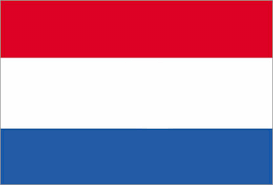
Flag of Apolo

Apolo is a location in the Franz Tamayo Province in the La Paz Department, Bolivia, South America, with a population of 2,123 in the year 2001. It is the seat of the Apolo Municipality.

The main plaza is dominated by a large Roman Catholic Chapel. There are three schools with most children attending in the morning.

It is approximately fourteen hours away from the La Paz capital. On the way to Apolo the road is accompanied by numerous waterfalls and changing landscapes.

The village is served by Apolo Airport.

== Climate ==
Climate data for Apolo, elevation 1,383 m (4,537 ft), (1976–2008)
Month	Jan	Feb	Mar	Apr	May	Jun	Jul	Aug	Sep	Oct	Nov	Dec	Year
Mean daily maximum °C (°F)	25.9 (78.6)	25.6 (78.1)	25.4 (77.7)	25.0 (77.0)	24.1 (75.4)	23.3 (73.9)	23.1 (73.6)	25.1 (77.2)	26.5 (79.7)	26.9 (80.4)	26.7 (80.1)	26.5 (79.7)	25.3 (77.6)
Daily mean °C (°F)	21.2 (70.2)	21.0 (69.8)	20.9 (69.6)	20.4 (68.7)	19.5 (67.1)	18.6 (65.5)	18.2 (64.8)	19.5 (67.1)	20.7 (69.3)	21.4 (70.5)	21.4 (70.5)	21.5 (70.7)	20.4 (68.6)
Mean daily minimum °C (°F)	16.5 (61.7)	16.5 (61.7)	16.3 (61.3)	15.8 (60.4)	14.9 (58.8)	13.9 (57.0)	13.3 (55.9)	14.0 (57.2)	15.0 (59.0)	15.9 (60.6)	16.2 (61.2)	16.5 (61.7)	15.4 (59.7)
Average precipitation mm (inches)	204.6 (8.06)	179.9 (7.08)	173.6 (6.83)	109.2 (4.30)	56.0 (2.20)	37.2 (1.46)	29.6 (1.17)	42.5 (1.67)	57.0 (2.24)	125.3 (4.93)	148.0 (5.83)	186.4 (7.34)	1,349.3 (53.11)
Average precipitation days	15.4	14.6	13.9	10.4	7.4	6.0	6.0	5.7	7.9	10.8	12.5	14.4	125
Average relative humidity (%)	81.0	81.1	80.8	79.0	79.5	79.3	76.8	72.9	71.7	73.7	77.7	78.6	77.7
Source: Servicio Nacional de Meteorología e Hidrología de Bolivia
