= Franz Tamayo Province =

- Province
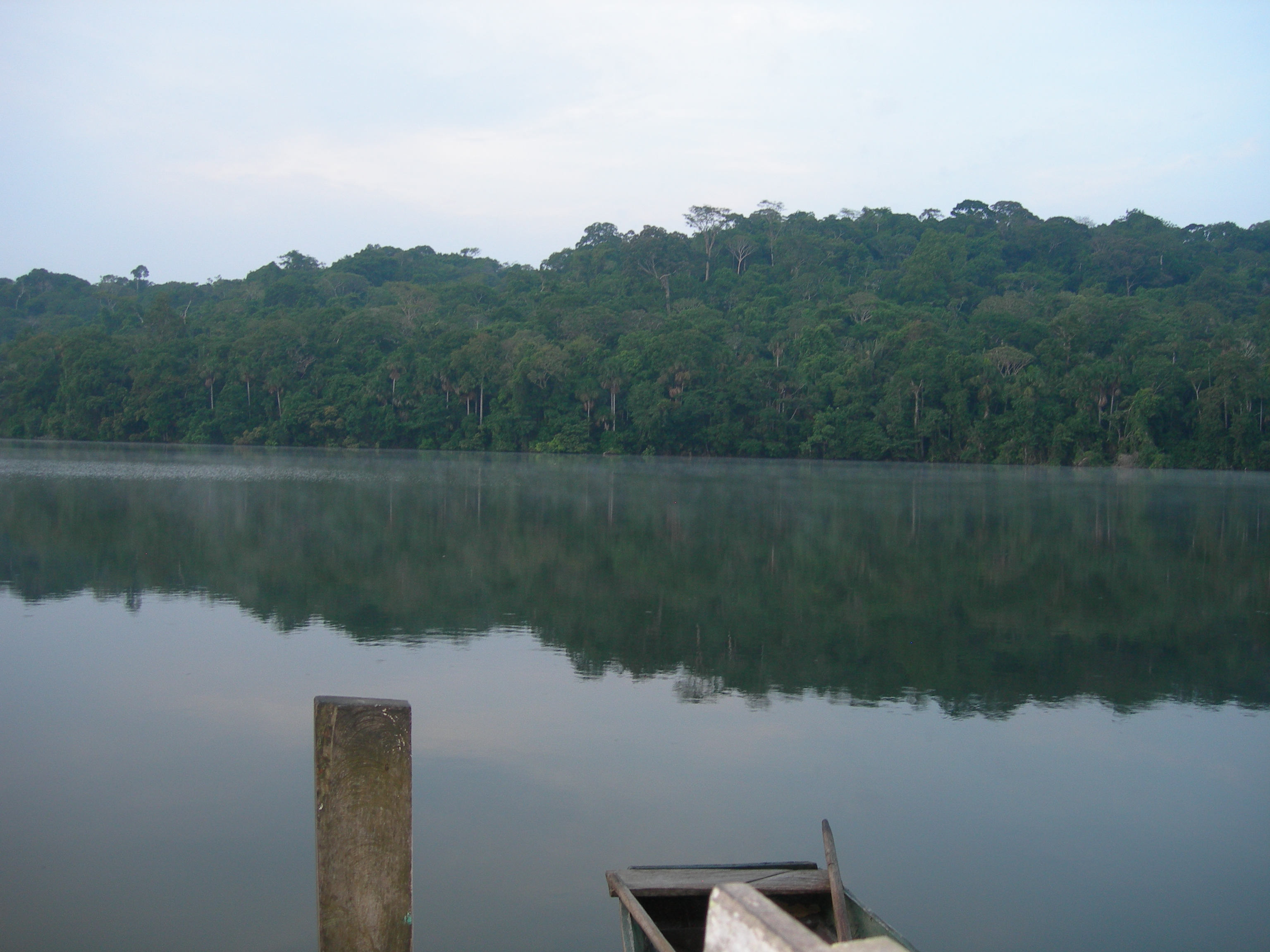
- Chalalan Lake

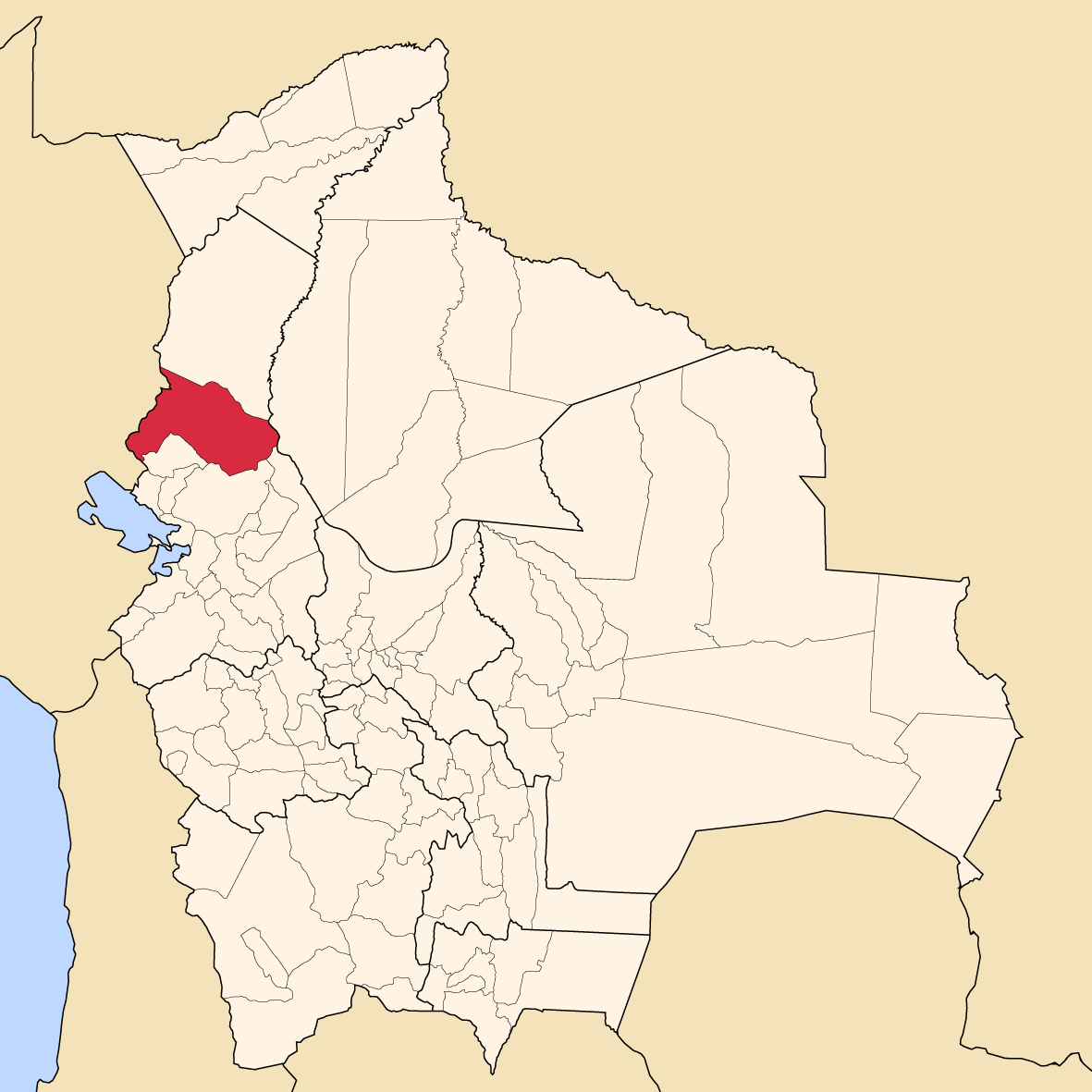
- Location of Franz Tamayo Province within Bolivia

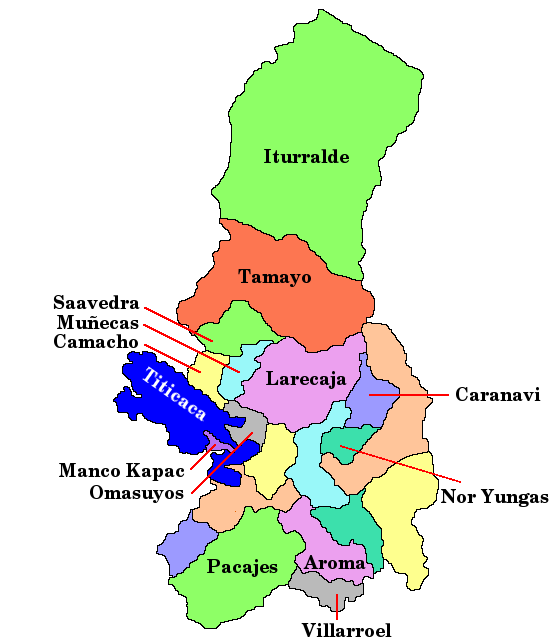
- Provinces of the La Paz Department
- Coordinates: 16°0′0″S 67°5′0″W
- Country: Bolivia
- Department: La Paz Department
- Municipalities: 2
- Cantons: 9
- Capital: Apolo

Area
  - Total: 15,900 km^{2} (6,100 sq mi)

Population (2024 census)
  - Total: 28,040
  - Density: 1.76/km^{2} (4.57/sq mi)
  - Ethnicities: Quechua Aymara
- Time zone: UTC-4 (BOT)
- Area code: BO.LP.FT
- Website: Official website

Franz Tamayo is a province in the Bolivian department of La Paz. It lies in the western part of the nation, and includes the Ulla Ulla National Reserve - which today is part of the Apolobamba Integrated Management Natural Area - in the high Andean plain on the western border with Peru. Its capital is Apolo.

The province was founded with the name Caupollcán on January 23, 1826. On December 20, 1967 the name was changed in honor of the Bolivian intellectual, writer and politician Franz Tamayo (1878–1956).

== Geography ==
The Apolobamba mountain range traverses the province. The highest mountain of the province is Chawpi Urqu (Wisk'achani) at 6,044 m (19,829 ft). Other mountains are listed below:

- Allqamarini
- Apachita Pura Pura
- Chawpi Urqu (Bolivia)
- Chinkani
- Ch'amakani
- Ch'usiqani
- Jach'a Waracha
- Jichu Qullu
- Kulli Pata
- Khunuyu
- Machu Such'i Qhuchi
- Palumani
- Puka Puka
- Punta Yawri
- P'isaqa
- Qala Phusa
- Q'umir Pata
- Rit'i Apachita
- Salluyu
- Supay Punku
- Ulla Qhaya
- Wank'uchiri
- Waracha
- Yawa Yawa

== Subdivision ==
Franz Tamayo Province is divided into two municipalities which are further subdivided into nine cantons.

Section	Municipality	Seat
1st	Apolo Municipality	Apolo
2nd	Pelechuco Municipality	Pelechuco

== Places of interest ==
Some of the tourist attractions of the municipalities are:

- In Apolo Municipality:
  - San Juan de Asariamas dry forest in Apolo Canton. The dominant trees species are the Bilka (Anadenanthera macrocarpa), the Cuchi (Astronium urundeuva), and the Brazilian Soto (Schinopsis brasiliensis).
  - Machariapo River in Apolo Canton situated within Madidi National Park and Area of Integrated Management
  - the Inca bridge in Santa Teresa community and the Chiara Alto waterfall of 18 m height in Apolo Canton
  - the community of Pata, its old church and the Sillakunka tunnel in Pata Canton
  - the valley of the community of Virgen del Rosario, also named Tuichi, in Pata Canton at the shores of Tuichi River
  - the community of Santa Cruz del Valle Ameno, the Billipiza waterfall of 22 m height in Vaquería and the archaeological site near Inca Viewpoint in Santa Cruz del Valle Ameno Canton
  - Trinity festivity (Santísima Trinidad) in the community of Atén
  - the pre-Columbian trails
  - Turiapo River and its waterfall in the community of Pucasucho
  - Ayara waterfall of about 18 m height in the community of Munaypatac
- In Pelechuco Municipality:
  - Katantika, one of the most important peaks of the Apolobamba mountain range, about 5,592 m high, in Pelechuco Canton
  - the colonial town of Pelechuco
  - the village of Queara near Pelechuco which is also situated in the highest area of Madidi National Park
  - the Ulla Ulla National Reserve in Ulla Ulla Canton, today a part of the Apolobamba Integrated Management Natural Area
  - the pre-Hispanic Guanan ruins in Pelechuco Canton
  - Cololo Lake in Antaquilla de Copacabana Canton
  - Suches Lake on the border to Peru

Other remarkable places are Pilón Lajas Biosphere Reserve and Communal Lands, Chalalan Lake and Chalalan ecolodge.

== See also ==
- K'ayrani Quta
- K'iski Quta
