= Cunuyo =

Mountain in Peru

- Location within Bolivia

Highest point
- Elevation: 5,100 m (16,700 ft)
- Coordinates: 14°35′40″S 69°13′39″W

Geography
- Location: Bolivia–Peru border
- Parent range: Andes, Apolobamba

Cunuyo (possibly from Aymara khunu snow, uyu corral, "snow corral") is a mountain in the north of the Apolobamba mountain range on the border of Bolivia and Peru. It is about 5,100 metres (16,732 ft) high. On the Bolivian side it is located in the La Paz Department, Franz Tamayo Province, Pelechuco Municipality, and on the Peruvian side it lies in the Puno Region, Putina Province, Sina District. Cunuyo is situated southwest of the mountain Locopauchenta and east of Losojocha.

Cunuyo is also the name of a river which originates near the mountain. It flows to the northeast.
