= Allqamarini =

Mountain in Bolivia

- Location within Bolivia

Highest point
- Elevation: 4,920 m (16,140 ft)
- Coordinates: 14°40′27″S 69°08′43″W

Geography
- Location: Bolivia, La Paz Department, Franz Tamayo Province
- Parent range: Andes, Apolobamba

Allqamarini (Aymara and Quechua allqamari "mountain caracara", -ni a suffix to indicate ownership, "the one with the mountain caracara", also spelled Allkhamarini) is a mountain in the northern part of the Apolobamba mountain range in the Andes of Bolivia, about 4,920 m (16,140 ft) high. It is located in the La Paz Department, Franz Tamayo Province, Pelechuco Municipality. Allqamarini is situated northeast of Chuquyu and north of the small lake named Chiri Mach'ay (Quechua for "cold cave", Chirimachaya).
