= Ulla Ulla National Reserve =

Protected area in Bolivia

Coordinates: 15°S 69°W

The Ulla Ulla National Reserve in Bolivia - which today is part of Apolobamba Integrated Management Natural Area - is a biosphere reserve located in the Franz Tamayo Province, in the Department of La Paz in the west of the country. It was created in 1972.

The Reserve is on the high Andean plain northwest of the city of La Paz, with an average elevation of over 4000 meters above sea level. Its western border is the political border with Peru. The park is about 2,000 km^{2} in size and is populated by about 12,000 people, most of them of Aymara origin. The park protects part of the Central Andean wet puna ecoregion. It is also the home of the Andean Condor (Vultur gryphus) (reportedly the largest flying bird in the world), as well as significant populations of alpacas. It is also home to the largest group of vicuñas (Vicugna vicugna) in Bolivia.

The park was designated a UNESCO biosphere reserve in 1977.

In the year 2000 the reserve was expanded and renamed as the Apolobamba National Natural Area of Integrated Management.
