= Salluyu =

Mountain in Bolivia

- Location within Bolivia

Highest point
- Elevation: 5,650 m (18,540 ft)
- Coordinates: 14°40′03″S 69°13′57″W

Geography
- Location: Bolivia, La Paz Department, Franz Tamayo Province, Pelechuco Municipality
- Parent range: Andes, Apolobamba

Salluyu (Aymara, salla rocks, cliffs, uyu corral, "rock corral", also spelled Salluyo) is a mountain in the Apolobamba mountain range at the border of Bolivia and Peru, about 5,650 metres (18,537 ft) high. It is situated in the La Paz Department, Franz Tamayo Province, Pelechuco Municipality, near 14°40′03″S 69°13′57″W. Salluyu lies between the peaks of Chawpi Urqu (or Wisk'achani) in the north and Palumani in the south.
