= Jach'a Waracha =

Mountain in Bolivia

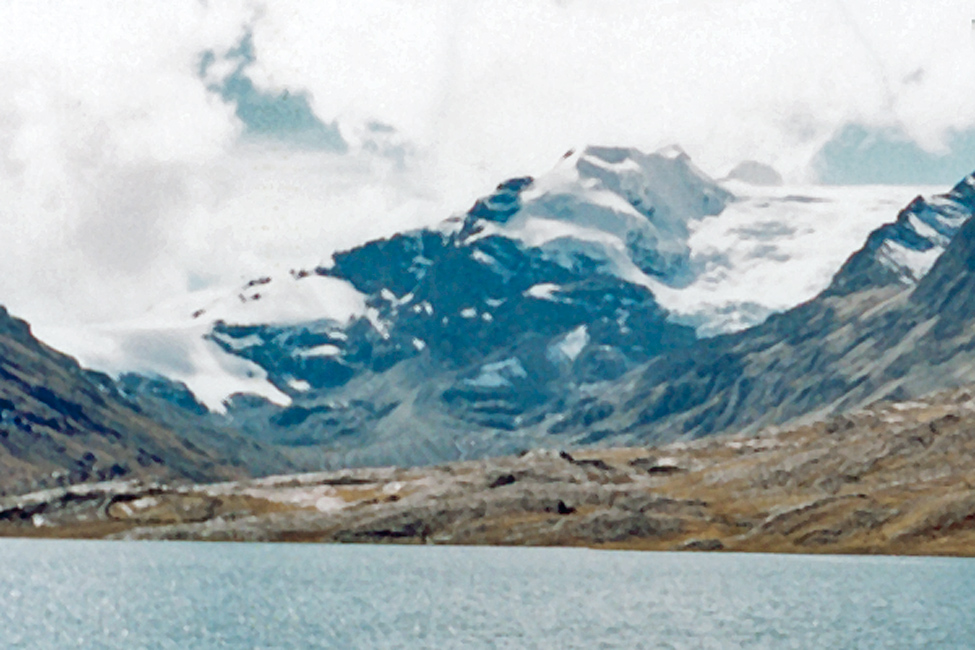
- Jach'a Waracha as seen from the west with Phawchi Lake (Phauchi) in the foreground

Highest point
- Elevation: 5,540 m (18,180 ft)
- Listing: Mountains of the Andes
- Coordinates: 14°52′12″S 69°7′22″W

Geography
- Location within Bolivia
- Country: Bolivia
- Department: La Paz
- Province: Franz Tamayo
- Municipality: Pelechuco
- Parent range: Andes, Apolobamba

Jach'a Waracha (Aymara, jach'a big, waracha wooden camp bed, Hispanicized spelling Jacha Huaracha) is a mountain in the Apolobamba mountain range in Bolivia, at 5,540 metres (18,176 ft) high. It is situated in the La Paz Department, Franz Tamayo Province, Pelechuco Municipality. Jach'a Waracha lies west of the mountain Waracha and north-west of the mountain Qala Phusa.

== See also ==
- Machu Such'i Qhuchi
- Cololo Lake
- Wanakuni
