= Qala Phusa =

Mountain in Bolivia

- Q'ululu
- Location within Bolivia

Highest point
- Elevation: 5,465 m (17,930 ft)
- Listing: Mountains of the Andes
- Coordinates: 14°53′14″S 69°6′54″W

Geography
- Country: Bolivia
- Department: La Paz
- Province: Franz Tamayo
- Municipality: Pelechuco
- Parent range: Andes, Apolobamba

Qala Phusa (Aymara qala stone, phusa siku, "stone siku", also spelled Khala Phusa) or Q'ululu (Aymara for stallion of a llama, alpaca or vicuña, Hispanicized spelling Cololo) is a 5,465-metre-high (17,930 ft) mountain in the Apolobamba mountain range in Bolivia. It situated in the La Paz Department, Franz Tamayo Province, Pelechuco Municipality. Qala Phusa lies southwest of Waracha and southeast of Jach'a Waracha.
