= San Antonio de Putina province =

Coordinates: 14°54′50″S 69°52′25″W

San Antonio de Putina
- Province
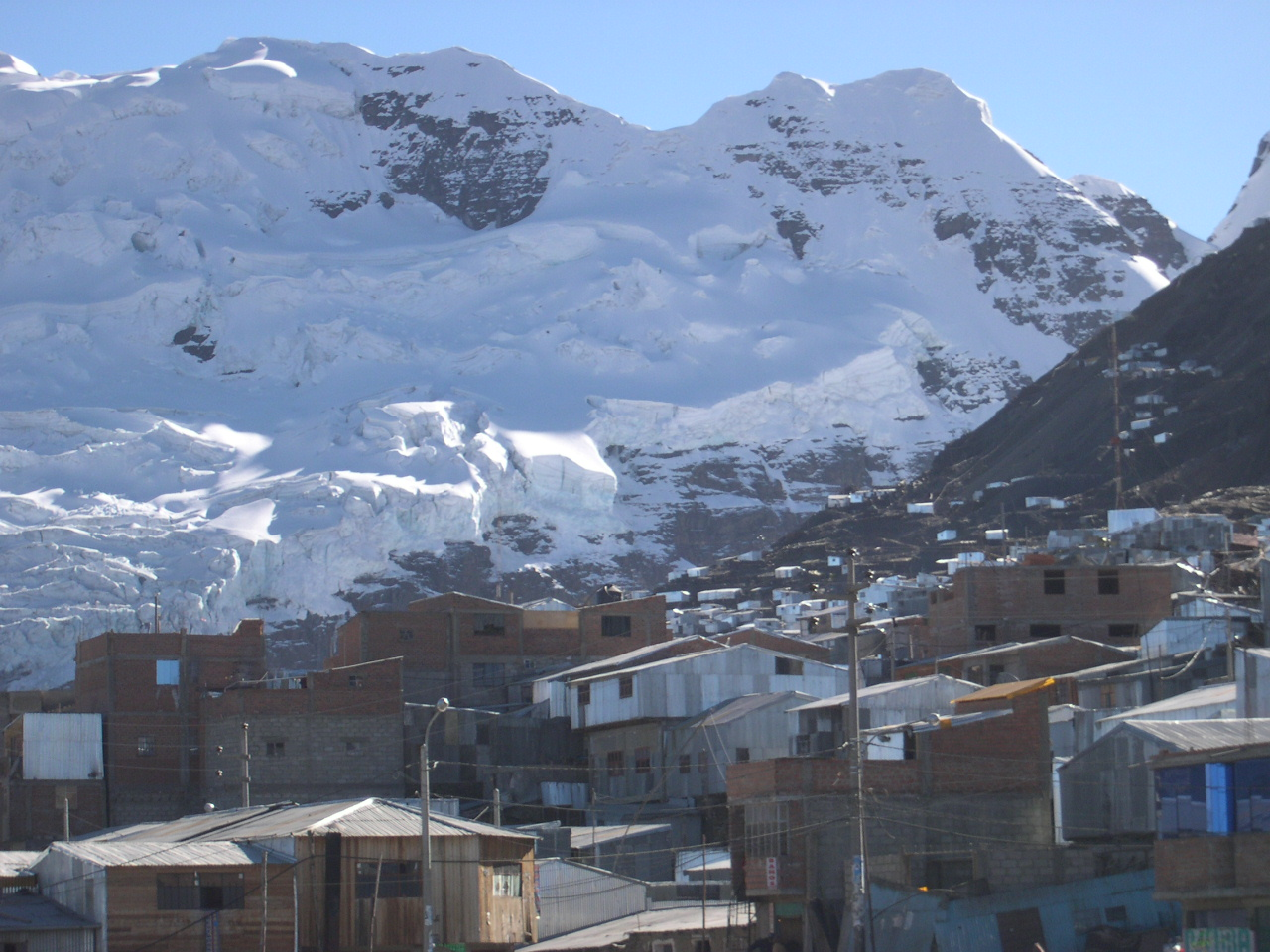
- La Rinconada

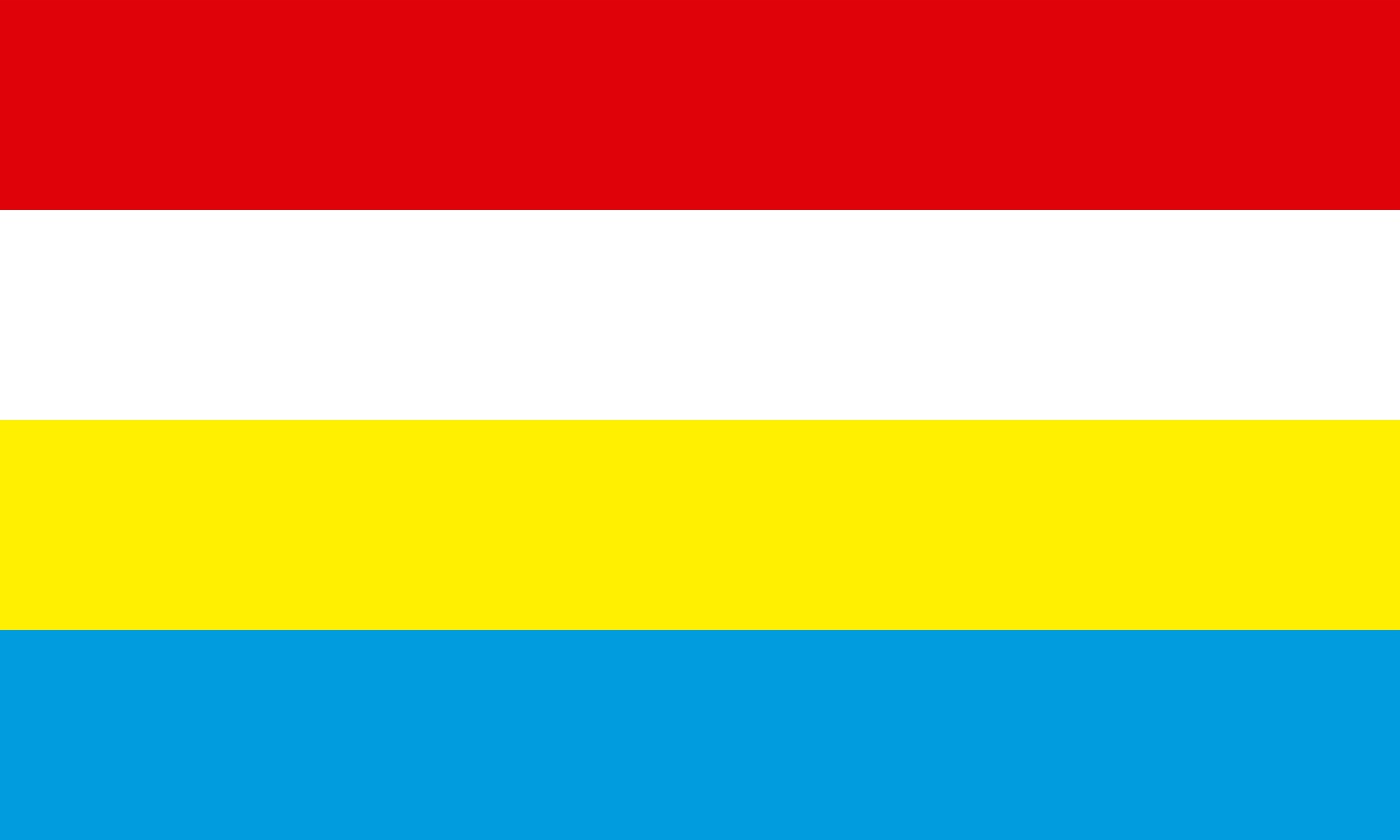
- Flag

- Location of San Antonio de Putina in the Puno Region
- Country: Peru
- Region: Puno
- Founded: June 12, 1989
- Capital: Putina

Government
  - Mayor: Alex Max Sullca Cáceres (2007-10)

Area
  - Total: 3,207.38 km^{2} (1,238.38 sq mi)
- Elevation: 3,874 m (12,710 ft)

Population
  - Total: 44,853
  - Density: 13.984/km^{2} (36.219/sq mi)
- UBIGEO: 2110
- Website: www.muniputina.gob.pe

San Antonio de Putina is a province of the Puno Region in Peru.

== Political division ==
The province measures 3,207.38 square kilometres (1,238.38 sq mi) and is divided into five districts:

District	Mayor	Capital	Ubigeo
Ananea	Crispin Amanqui Rodriguez	Ananea	211002
Pedro Vilca Apaza	Juan Pablo Salas Chipana	Ayrampuni	211003
Putina	Alex Max Sullca Caceres	Putina	211001
Quilcapuncu	Leonardo Lipa Alvarez	Quilcapuncu	211004
Sina	Marcial Huanca Mamani	Sina	211005

== Geography ==
The Apolobamba mountain range traverses the province. Wisk'achani (Chawpi Urqu), the highest mountain of the range, lies on the border with Bolivia. Other peaks of the province are listed below:

- Allqamarini
- Ananea
- Chapi
- Chimpa Qiswarani
- Chuqichampi
- Ch'amakani
- Ch'uxñaquta
- Jach'a Tira
- Janq'u Uma
- Kimsa Tira
- Kunka
- Kuntur Ikiña (Ananea)
- Kuntur Ikiña (Cuyocuyo)
- Kuntur Sayana
- Kuntur Thamaña
- Kunturini
- Khunuyu
- Laramani
- Lawa Tira
- Lisani
- Luqhu Phawchinta
- Lusuqucha
- Llantayuq
- Llawlli
- Mamanini
- Ñuñuwani
- Puka Urqu
- Palumani
- Puma Wachana
- Punta Yawri
- P'ujru
- Qachini
- Qala K'umu
- Qaqa Waychu
- Qillwani
- Qucha Kunka
- Quchapata
- Qurwari
- Qhuna Kunka
- Rit'i Urmasqa
- Rit'ipata
- Rit'iyuq
- Saywa
- Tarujani
- Uqi Nasa
- Uyuni
- Waylla Tira
- Wiqu
- Yana Uma
- Yana Urqu
- Yanaqucha
- Yawa Yawa

== Ethnic groups ==
The people in the province are mainly indigenous citizens of Quechua descent. Quechua is the language which the majority of the population (60.23%) learnt to speak in childhood, 30.24% of the residents started speaking using the Spanish language and 9.37% using Aymara (2007 Peru Census).

== See also ==
- Chullpaqucha
- Ch'uxñaquta
