= Rit'i Apachita =

Mountain in Bolivia

- Location within Bolivia

Highest point
- Elevation: 5,029 m (16,499 ft)
- Coordinates: 14°44′39″S 69°7′02″W

Geography
- Location: Bolivia, La Paz Department, Franz Tamayo Province, Pelechuco Municipality
- Parent range: Andes, Apolobamba

Rit'i Apachita (Quechua, rit'i snow, Aymara and Quechua apachita the place of transit of an important pass in the principal routes of the Andes; name in the Andes for a stone cairn, a little pile of rocks built along the trail in the high mountains, Hispanicized spelling Riti Apacheta) is a 5,029-metre-high (16,499 ft) mountain in the Apolobamba mountain range in Bolivia. It is situated in the La Paz Department, Franz Tamayo Province, Pelechuco Municipality, north-west of Pelechuco. Rit'i Apachita lies northeast of the mountain Sural (Soral) and southeast of the mountain Apachita Pura Pura.

There is a little lake east of the mountain named Q'illuqucha (Quechua for "yellow lake", Quellucocha).
