= Apolobamba Integrated Management Natural Area =

Protected area in Bolivia

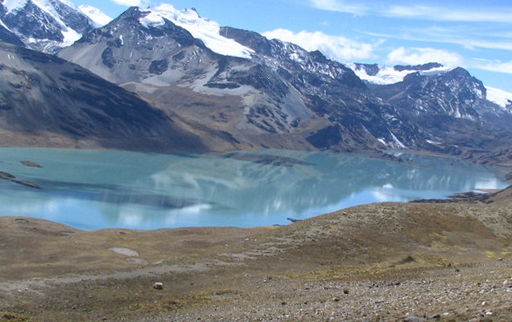
- Laguna Suches, Peru, Bolivia
- Interactive map of Apolobamba Integrated Management Natural Area
- Location: Bolivia; La Paz Department
- Coordinates: 14.993°S 68.82°W
- Area: 4,837.43 km^{2} (1,867.74 sq mi)
- Established: 1972, extended in 2000

The Apolobamba Integrated Management Natural Area (Área Natural de Manejo Integrado Apolobamba) is a protected area in the La Paz Department, Bolivia, situated in the Bautista Saavedra, Franz Tamayo and Larecaja provinces.

It was created in 1972 and was originally named the Ulla Ulla National Reserve.

The park was designated a UNESCO biosphere reserve in 1977.

The area is composed by Humid Andean forests, Cloud forests, Yungas moorland, wetladns and glacial lakes.

== Flora and Fauna ==
It is estimated that 1,800 species of plants. Species are adapted to different regions. Gramineas, lichens and shrubs adapted to high altitudes. Some species are: queñua trees (Polylepis spp.), giant bromeliad (Puya raimondii), quina trees (Cinchona officinalis).

Nearly to 300 vertebrate species were registered. Some species are: vicuña, jucumari bear, andean dear (taruka), andean montain cat and vizcacha. Traditional herding of domestic camelids, llamas and alpacas, is also practiced in the higher region.

== See also ==
- Apolobamba
