= Chapi (Peru) =

Mountain in Peru

- Location within Peru

Highest point
- Elevation: 5,400 m (17,700 ft)
- Coordinates: 14°37′42″S 69°20′51″W

Geography
- Location: Peru, Puno Region
- Parent range: Andes, Apolobamba

Chapi (possibly from Quechua for tin) or Ch'api (possibly from Aymara for thorn) is a 5,400-metre-high (17,717 ft) mountain in the Apolobamba mountain range in the Andes of Peru. It is located in the Puno Region, Putina Province, on the border of the districts Ananea and Sina. Chapi is situated southeast of the mountains Ananea and Ritipata, north-west of Riti Urmasca and north-east of the lake Asnococha.
