= Pelechuco =

- Town
- Location within Bolivia
- Coordinates: 14°49′S 69°04′W
- Country: Bolivia
- Department: La Paz Department
- Province: Franz Tamayo Province
- Municipality: Pelechuco Municipality

Population (2001)
  - Total: 936
- Time zone: UTC-4 (BOT)
- Climate: Cwb

Pelechuco is a location in the La Paz Department in Bolivia. It is the administrative seat of the Pelechuco Municipality, the second municipal section of the Franz Tamayo Province.
