= Ritipata (Puno) =

Mountain in Peru

- Location within Peru

Highest point
- Elevation: 5,350 m (17,550 ft)
- Coordinates: 14°37′11″S 69°21′34″W

Geography
- Location: Peru, Puno Region
- Parent range: Andes, Apolobamba

Ritipata (possibly from Quechua) is a 5,350-metre-high (17,552 ft) mountain in the Apolobamba mountain range in the Andes of Peru. It is located in the Puno Region, Putina Province, Ananea District, as well as in the Sandia Province, Quiaca District. Ritipata is situated south-east of the mountain Vilacota, east of the mountain Ananea and north-west of the mountain Chapi, next to it.

== See also ==
- Riti Urmasca
