= Chaupi Orco (mountain) =

Mountain in Peru

- Viscachani
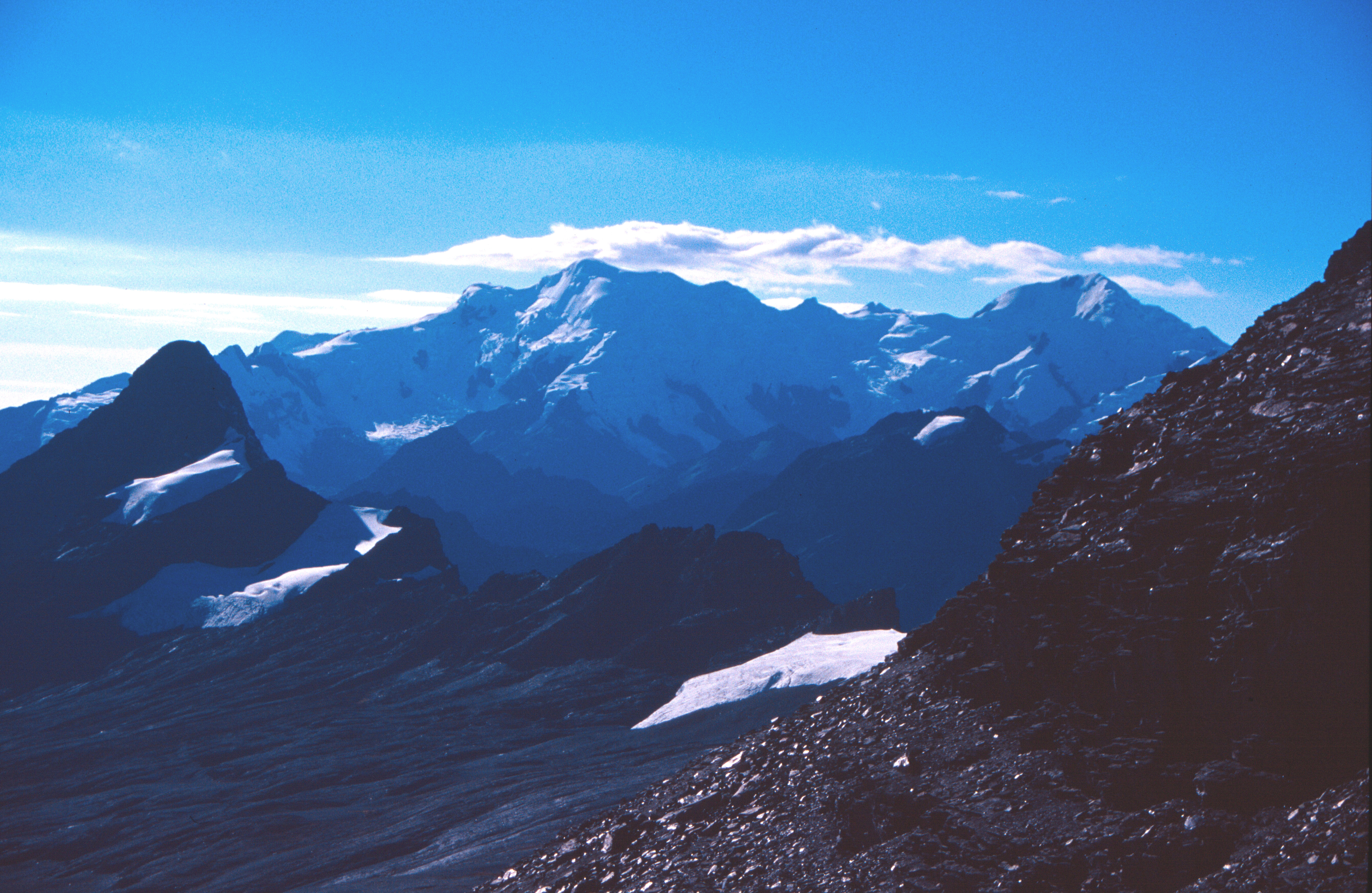
- Chaupi Orco from the west

Highest point
- Elevation: 6,044 m (19,829 ft)
- Prominence: 1,537 m (5,043 ft)
- Parent peak: Ausangate (6384 m)
- Listing: Ultra
- Coordinates: 14°39′12″S 69°13′42″W

Geography
- Location within Peru Location within Bolivia
- Countries: Bolivia and Peru
- Parent range: Apolobamba, Andes

Climbing
- First ascent: 1 August 1957 - Werner Karl, Hans Richter, and Hans Wimmer (Germany)

Chaupi Orco (possibly from the Quechua spelling Chawpi Urqu; chawpi middle, center, urqu mountain) or Viscachani (possibly from the Aymara 'wisk'acha viscacha) is a mountain in the Andes on the border of Bolivia and Peru. It has a height of 6,044 metres (19,829 ft). On the Bolivian side it is located in the La Paz Department, Franz Tamayo Province, Pelechuco Municipality, and on the Peruvian side it lies in the Puno Region, Putina Province, Sina District. It lies north of Salluyu. Chaupi Orco is the highest peak of the Apolobamba mountain range.

== Elevation ==
Other data from available digital elevation models: SRTM yields 6001 metres, ASTER 6028 metres, ALOS 6015 metres and TanDEM-X 6071 metres. The height of the nearest key col is 4,489 m (14,728 ft), leading to a topographic prominence of 1,555 m (5,102 ft). Chaupi Orco is considered a Mountain Range according to the Dominance System and its dominance is 25.73%. Its parent peak is Ausangate and the Topographic isolation is 236 km (147 mi).

== First Ascent ==
Chaupi Orco was first climbed by Werner Karl, Hans Richter and Hans Wimmer (Germany) August 1, 1957.

== See also ==
- List of mountains in the Andes
- List of Ultras of South America
