= Riti Urmasca =

Mountain in Peru

- Location within Peru

Highest point
- Elevation: 5,200 m (17,100 ft)
- Coordinates: 14°38′45″S 69°17′15″W

Geography
- Location: Peru, Puno Region
- Parent range: Andes, Apolobamba

Riti Urmasca or Ritiurcamasca (possibly from Quechua rit'i snow, urmasqa fallen down, "snow fallen down") is a mountain in the Andes of Peru, about 5,200 metres (17,060 ft) high. It is situated in the Puno Region, Putina Province, on the border of the districts Ananea and Sina. Riti Urmasca lies southeast of the mountain Ritipata and southwest of Chaupi Orco at the mountain pass Iscaycruz (possibly from Quechua iskay two, Spanish cruz cross, "two crosses").
