= Suches Lake =

Lake in Peru

Laguna Suches Lago Suches
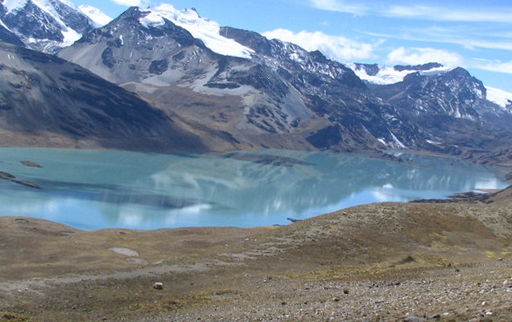

- Location within Bolivia Location within Peru Location within South America
- Interactive map of Laguna Suches; Lago Suches
- Location: La Paz Department, Bolivia / Puno Region, Peru
- Coordinates: 14°46′05″S 69°16′19″W
- Primary outflows: Río Suches
- Basin countries: Bolivia, Peru
- Surface area: 14.2 km^{2} (5.5 sq mi)
- Surface elevation: 4,605 m (15,108 ft)
- Islands: 7

Laguna Suches or Lago Suches is a lake in the La Paz Department of Bolivia and Puno Region, Peru. Located at an elevation of 4,605 m, its surface area is 14.2 km^{2}.

== See also ==
- Machu Such'i Qhuchi
