= Cordillera Apolobamba =

Mountain range in Bolivia and Peru

Apolobamba
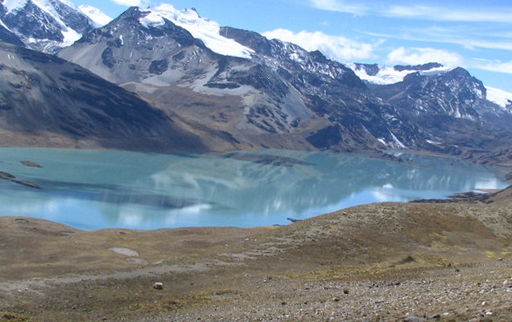
- Suches Lake in the Apolobamba Integrated Management Natural Area

Highest point
- Peak: Chaupi Orco
- Elevation: 6,044 m (19,829 ft)
- Coordinates: 14°39′S 69°14′W

Geography
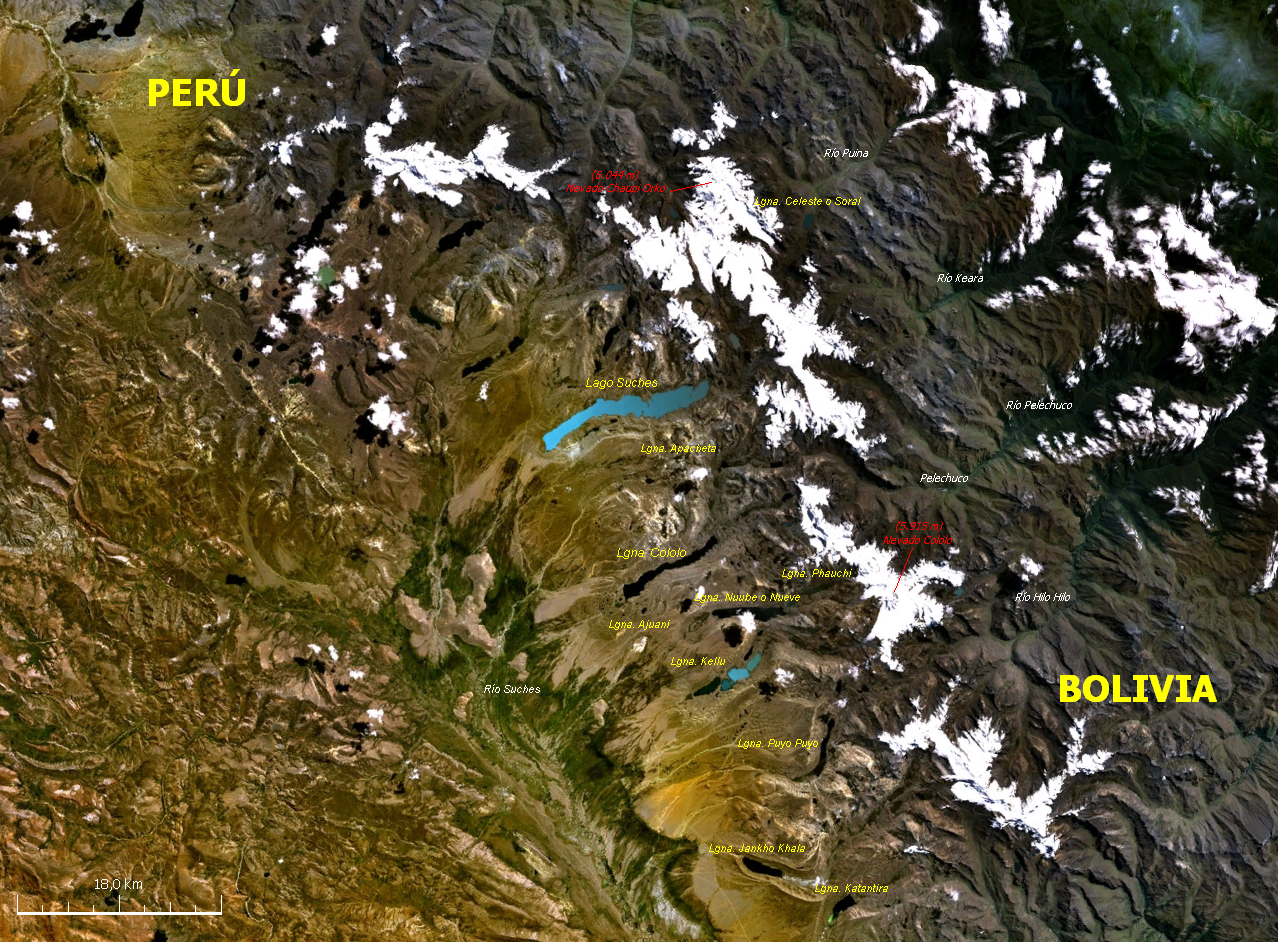
- Satellite image of Apolobamba
- Countries: Peru and Bolivia
- Parent range: Andes

Apolobamba (Cordillera (de) Apolobamba) is a mountain range in the South American Andes.

== Geography ==
Apolobamba is located in the eastern borderland of Peru and Bolivia. On the Bolivian side, the mountain range is situated in the La Paz Department and on the Peruvian side it lies in the Puno Region. It stretches across a distance of 50 km (31 mi) from east to west and 30 km (19 mi) from north to south.

Curva, the main locality of the Kallawaya-people, is located 3,800 m (12,500 ft) above sea level.

== Mountains ==
The highest mountain in the range is Chaupi Orco, also known as Wisk'achani, at 6,044 metres (19,829 ft). Other notable peaks are:

- Akamani, 5,400 metres (17,717 ft)
- Allqamarini, 4,920 metres (16,142 ft)
- Apachita Pura Pura, 5,360 metres (17,585 ft)
- Asu Q'arani, 5,580 metres (18,307 ft)
- Canisaya, 5,706 metres (18,720 ft)
- Chawpi Urqu, 4,617 metres (15,148 ft)
- Choquechambi, 5,000 metres (16,404 ft)
- Chuquyu, 5,546 metres (18,196 ft)
- Cuchillo, 5,655 metres (18,553 ft)
- Chapi, 5,400 metres (17,717 ft)
- Chocñacota, 5,300 metres (17,388 ft)
- Iskay Cruz Rit'i, 5,200 metres (17,060 ft)
- Cunuyo, 4,800 metres (15,748 ft)
- Jach'a Waracha, 5,540 metres (18,176 ft)
- Janq'u Uma, 4,800 metres (15,748 ft)
- Ichocollo, 5,423 metres (17,792 ft)
- Katantika, 5,630 metres (18,471 ft)
- Kulli Pata, 4,800 metres (15,748 ft)
- Kuntur Ikiña, 5,100 metres (16,732 ft)
- K'usilluni, 4,600 metres (15,092 ft)
- Locopauchenta, 5,000 metres (16,404 ft)
- Losojocha, 5,338 metres (17,513 ft)
- Machu Such'i Qhuchi, 5,679 metres (18,632 ft)
- Manqu Qhapaq
- Nubi, 5,710 metres (18,734 ft)
- Palomani, 5,723 metres (18,776 ft)
- Punta Yavre, 4,600 metres (15,092 ft)
- Qala Phusa, 5,465 metres (17,930 ft)
- Jajahuaycho, 5,200 metres (17,060 ft)
- Jorhuari, 5,200 metres (17,060 ft)
- Qutañani, 4,900 metres (16,076 ft)
- Qillwa Quta, 4,900 metres (16,076 ft)
- Q'umir Pata, 4,720 metres (15,486 ft)
- Q'uru Qhini
- Rit'i Apachita, 5,029 metres (16,499 ft)
- Riti Urmasca, 5,200 metres (17,060 ft)
- Ritipata, 5,350 metres (17,552 ft)
- Rit'iyuq, 4,900 metres (16,076 ft)
- Salluyu, 5,650 metres (18,537 ft)
- Sorapata, 5,900 metres (19,357 ft)
- Ulla Qhaya, 5,617 metres (18,428 ft)
- Wanaku
- Huanacuni, 5,796 metres (19,016 ft)
- Wank'uchiri, 5,382 metres (17,657 ft)
- Waracha, 5,419 metres (17,779 ft)
- Warini
- Wila Kunka, 4,520 metres (14,829 ft)
- Vilacota, 5,179 metres (16,991 ft)
- Huejo, 4,900 metres (16,076 ft)
- Yanauma, 5,009 metres (16,434 ft)
- Yana Urqu

== Lakes ==
The largest lake in the range is Such'i Lake. Such'i is what the Aymara and Quechua people call a little fish which lives in the cold waters of the lakes and rivers of the Altiplano. Other lakes are listed below:

- Ch'uxña Quta (Curva)
- Ch'uxñaquta (Putina)
- Cololo Lake
- K'ayrani Quta
- K'iski Quta
- Qachu Quta
- Qaqa Waychu
- Qillwa Quta
- Q'illu Qucha

== See also ==
- Apolobamba Integrated Management Natural Area
- Cordillera Real
- Cordillera Kimsa Cruz
