= Daniel Radcliffe on screen and stage =

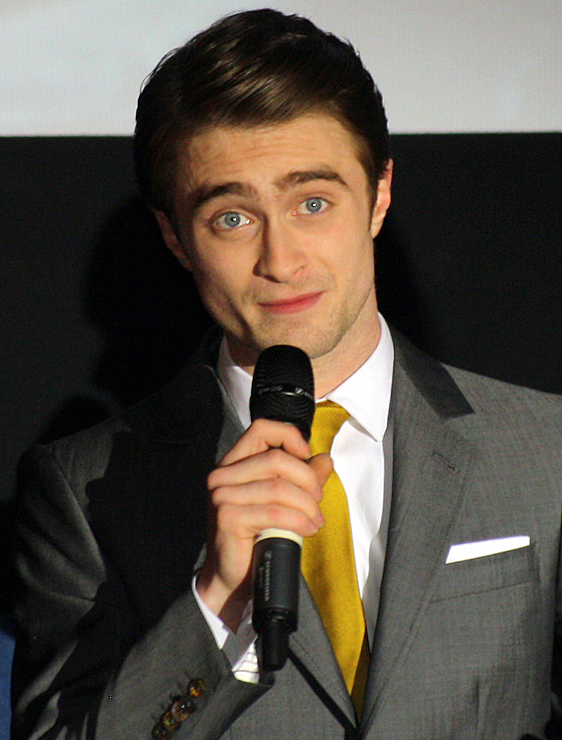
- Radcliffe in 2015
- Film: 27
- Television series: 14

Daniel Radcliffe is an English actor who has appeared on film, television and stage. He is best known for playing the role of Harry Potter in the eponymous film series from 2001 to 2011.

== Film ==
Key
†	Denotes films that have not yet been released

Year	Title	Role	Notes	Ref.
2001	The Tailor of Panama	Mark Pendel		
2001	Harry Potter and the Philosopher's Stone	Harry Potter		
2002	Harry Potter and the Chamber of Secrets	Harry Potter		
2004	Harry Potter and the Prisoner of Azkaban	Harry Potter		
2005	Harry Potter and the Goblet of Fire	Harry Potter		
2007	Harry Potter and the Order of the Phoenix	Harry Potter		
2007	December Boys	Maps		
2009	Harry Potter and the Half-Blood Prince	Harry Potter		
2010	Harry Potter and the Deathly Hallows – Part 1	Harry Potter		
2011	Harry Potter and the Deathly Hallows – Part 2	Harry Potter		
2012	The Woman in Black	Arthur Kipps		
2013	Kill Your Darlings	Allen Ginsberg		
2013	Horns	Ignatius "Ig" Perrish		
2013	What If	Wallace		
2015	Trainwreck	The Dog Walker		
2015	Victor Frankenstein	Igor		
2016	Swiss Army Man	Manny		
2016	Now You See Me 2	Walter Mabry		
2016	Imperium	Nate Foster		
2017	Lost in London	Himself		
2017	Jungle	Yossi Ghinsberg		
2018	Beast of Burden	Sean Haggerty		
2019	Playmobil: The Movie	Rex Dasher (voice)		
2019	Guns Akimbo	Miles Lee Harris		
2020	Escape from Pretoria	Tim Jenkin		
2022	The Lost City	Abigail Fairfax		
2022	Weird: The Al Yankovic Story	"Weird Al" Yankovic		
2025	Merrily We Roll Along	Charley Kringas	Live stage recording of musical	
2026	Pizza Movie	The Butterfly (voice)		
2026	Steps †	The Prince (voice)	Post-production	
TBA	Trust the Man †	TBA	Post-production; also executive producer	

== Television ==
Year	Title	Role	Notes	Ref.
1999	David Copperfield	Young David Copperfield	Television film	
2006	Extras	Himself	Episode: "Daniel Radcliffe"	
2007	My Boy Jack	John Kipling	Television film	
2010, 2014, 2018	The Simpsons	Edmund / Diggs / Himself	Voice roles; 3 episodes	
2012	Saturday Night Live	Himself (host)	Episode: "Daniel Radcliffe/Lana Del Rey"	
2012, 2017	Robot Chicken	Mullet Kid / Thomas the Tank Engine / Gareth	Voice roles; 2 episodes	
2012–2013	A Young Doctor's Notebook	Young Dr. Vladimir "Nika" Bomgard	8 episodes	
2012, 2015	Have I Got News for You	Himself (host)	2 episodes	
2015	BoJack Horseman	Himself	Voice role; Episode: "Let's Find Out"	
2015	The Gamechangers	Sam Houser	Television film	
2019–2023	Miracle Workers	Craig Bog (S1) / Prince Chauncley The Pretty Cool (S2) / Reverend Ezekiel Brown (S3) / Sid (S4)	Main role; also executive producer	
2020	Unbreakable Kimmy Schmidt: Kimmy vs the Reverend	Prince Frederick	Television film	
2022	Harry Potter 20th Anniversary: Return to Hogwarts	Himself	Television special	
2022	Rick and Morty	Knight of the Sun	Voice role; Episode: "A Rick in King Mortur's Mort"	
2023	Digman!	Sebastian Lines	Voice role; Episode: "Shakespeare's Lost Sonnet"	
2023–2024	Mulligan	King Jeremy Fitzhogg	Voice role; 12 episodes	
2023	David Holmes: The Boy Who Lived	Himself	Documentary; also executive producer	
2026–present	The Fall and Rise of Reggie Dinkins	Arthur Tobin	10 episodes	

== Stage ==
Year	Title	Role	Venue	Notes
2007	Equus	Alan Strang	Gielgud Theatre	West End
2008–2009	Equus	Alan Strang	Broadhurst Theatre	Broadway
2011–2012	How to Succeed in Business Without Really Trying	J. Pierrepont Finch	Al Hirschfeld Theatre	Broadway
2013	The Cripple of Inishmaan	Billy Claven	Noël Coward Theatre	West End
2014	The Cripple of Inishmaan	Billy Claven	Cort Theatre	Broadway
2016	Privacy	The Writer	The Public Theater	Off-Broadway
2017	Rosencrantz and Guildenstern Are Dead	Rosencrantz	The Old Vic	
2018	The Lifespan of a Fact	Fingal	Studio 54	Broadway
2020	Endgame / Rough for Theatre II	Clov / A	The Old Vic	
2022–2023	Merrily We Roll Along	Charley Kringas	New York Theatre Workshop	Off-Broadway
2023–2024	Merrily We Roll Along	Charley Kringas	Hudson Theatre	Broadway
2026	Every Brilliant Thing	Narrator	Hudson Theatre	Broadway

== Music videos ==
Year	Title	Role	Performer(s)	Ref.
2012	"Beginners"	Main character	Slow Club	
2016	"Demolisher"	Director, Editor	Behind Her Savage Killing	

== Others ==
Year	Title	Role	Ref.
2003	Mind Reading: The Interactive Guide to Emotions	Himself	
2010	Harry Potter and the Forbidden Journey	Harry Potter	

== See also ==
- List of awards and nominations received by Daniel Radcliffe
