= Gringo Trail =

Travel route in Latin America

The Gringo Trail refers to a string of the Latin American places most often visited by "gringos", North Americans, Europeans, Australasians, other budget travellers and also vice tourists.

== Geographical reach ==
The Gringo Trail encompasses almost all of Latin America, except Brazil, but there is no overland route on the Pan-American Highway between Central America and South America across the Darién Gap. Travelers generally charter boats in Panama or take the ferry. Maps depicting the trail's route have also been published online, including one covering the section of the trail through Guatemala.

North America

- Mexico:
  - Chichen Itza
  - Guanajuato
  - Isla Mujeres
  - Oaxaca
  - Puerto Escondido
  - Querétaro
  - Tulum
  - Cancún

Central America

- Belize:
  - Caye Caulker
  - San Ignacio
- Costa Rica:
  - Arenal
  - La Fortuna
  - Jacó
  - Manuel Antonio National Park
  - Montezuma
  - Nosara
  - Puerto Viejo de Talamanca
- Guatemala:
  - Antigua
  - Lake Atitlán
  - Semuc Champey
  - Tikal
- Honduras:
  - Bay Islands
  - Copán
- Nicaragua:
  - Corn Islands
  - Granada
  - Leon
  - Ometepe Island
  - San Juan del Sur
- Panama:
  - Bocas Del Toro
  - Boquete
  - Panama City (especially the Casco Viejo)
  - San Blas Islands
- El Salvador:
  - Joya de Cerén
  - El Sunzal
  - Tazumal

South America

- Argentina:
  - Buenos Aires
  - Iguaçu Falls
  - Mendoza
  - Ushuaia
- Bolivia:
  - La Paz
  - Potosí
  - Salar de Uyuni
  - Lake Titicaca
- Chile:
  - Easter Island
  - Pucón
  - San Pedro de Atacama
  - Torres del Paine
- Colombia:
  - Bogotá
  - Cartagena
  - Medellín
  - San Gil
  - Taganga
  - Tayrona National Natural Park
- Ecuador:
  - Cuenca
  - Galápagos Islands
  - Mompiche
  - Montañita
  - Quito
- Peru:
  - Arequipa
  - Cusco
  - Ica (Huacachina)
  - Iquitos
  - Lima
  - Machu Picchu
  - Máncora
  - Nazca
  - Puno

== See also ==
- Gringo Trails – 2013 documentary by Pegi Vail on the impact of tourism on cultures, economies, and environment
- Lonely Planet – guide books
- Grand Tour – 17th–19th century Continental tours by young European aristocrats, as leisure and education
- Banana Pancake Trail
- Hippie trail
