= List of awards and nominations received by Daniel Radcliffe =

Daniel Radcliffe awards and nominations
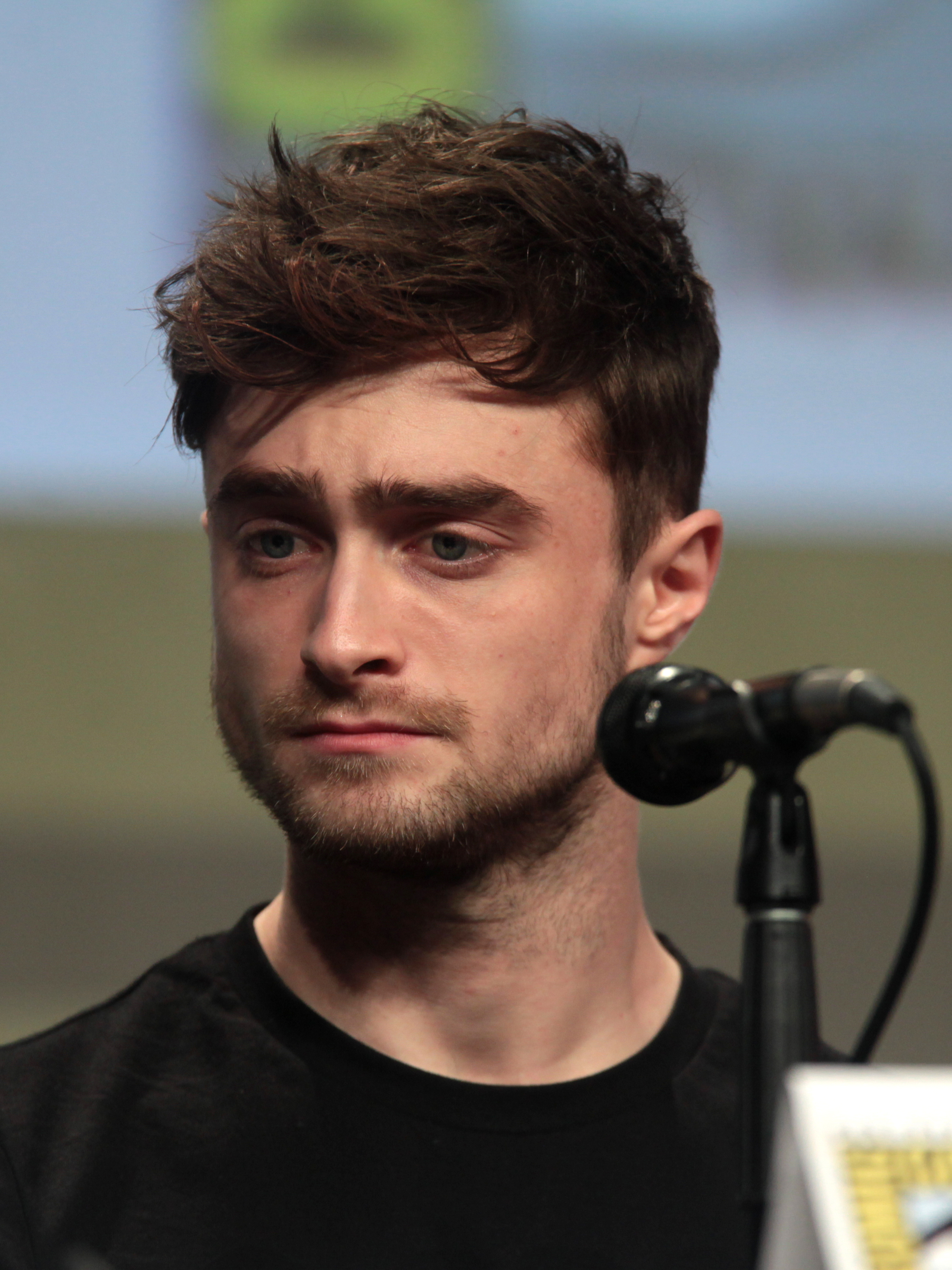
- Radcliffe at 2014 San Diego Comic Con International
Awards and nominations
Award	Wins	Nominations

Totals (Note: Certain award groups do not simply award one winner. They acknowledge several different recipients, have runners-up, and have third place. Since this is a specific recognition and is different from losing an award, runner-up mentions are considered wins in this award tally. For simplification and to avoid errors, each award in this list has been presumed to have had a prior nomination.)
- Wins: 22
- Nominations: 42

The following is a list of awards and nominations received by Daniel Radcliffe.

Daniel Radcliffe is an English actor known for his roles in film, television, and theatre. Over his career he received several awards, including a Tony Award and a Critics' Choice Television Award, as well as nominations for a BAFTA Award, a Primetime Emmy Award, and two Grammy Awards.

Radcliffe started his career and gained international stardom portraying the role of the teen wizard Harry Potter in the film series of the same name between 2001 and 2011. For his performance he received two MTV Movie & TV Awards, a People's Choice Award, a Scream Award, and three Teen Choice Awards, as well as nominations for four Critics' Choice Movie Awards and a Nickelodeon Kids' Choice Award.

He was nominated for four Drama Desk Awards for playing a teenager who blinded six horses in the Peter Shaffer play Equus (2009), J. Pierrepont Finch in the musical comedy revival How to Succeed in Business Without Really Trying (2011), and Cripple Billy in the Martin McDonagh play The Cripple of Inishmaan (2014). He won the Tony Award for Best Featured Actor in a Musical for his role as Charley Kringas in the Broadway revival of the Stephen Sondheim musical Merrily We Roll Along (2023). He also earned a nomination for the Grammy Award for Best Musical Theater Album for How to Succeed in Business Without Really Trying.

For his performance as "Weird Al" Yankovic in The Roku Channel television film Weird: The Al Yankovic Story (2023) he was nominated for the Primetime Emmy Award for Outstanding Lead Actor in a Limited or Anthology Series or Movie and the British Academy Television Award for Best Male Comedy Performance, and won the Critics' Choice Television Award for Best Actor in a Movie/Miniseries.

== Major associations ==
=== BAFTA Awards ===
Year	Category	Nominated work	Result	Ref.
British Academy Television Awards
2023	Best Male Comedy Performance	Weird: The Al Yankovic Story	Nominated	

=== Critics' Choice Awards ===
Year	Category	Nominated work	Result	Ref.
Critics Choice Movie Awards
2002	Best Young Performer	Harry Potter and the Philosopher's Stone	Nominated	
2003	Best Young Performer	Harry Potter and the Chamber of Secrets	Nominated	
2005	Best Young Performer	Harry Potter and the Prisoner of Azkaban	Nominated	
2006	Best Young Performer	Harry Potter and the Goblet of Fire	Nominated	
Critics' Choice Television Awards
2023	Best Actor in a Miniseries/Movie	Weird: The Al Yankovic Story	Won	

=== Emmy Awards ===
Year	Category	Nominated work	Result	Ref.
Primetime Emmy Awards
2023	Outstanding Lead Actor in a Limited or Anthology Series or Movie	Weird: The Al Yankovic Story	Nominated	
News and Documentary Emmy Awards
2024	Outstanding Social Issue Documentary	David Holmes: The Boy Who Lived	Nominated	

=== Grammy Awards ===
Year	Category	Nominated work	Result	Ref.
2011	Best Musical Theater Album	How to Succeed in Business Without Really Trying (Note: Shared with John Larroquette, Robert Sher, and Frank Loesser)	Nominated	
2024	Best Musical Theater Album	Merrily We Roll Along (Note: Shared with Jonathan Groff, Lindsay Mendez, David Caddick, Joel Fram, Maria Friedman & David Lai)	Nominated	

=== Tony Awards ===
Year	Category	Nominated work	Result	Ref.
2024	Best Featured Actor in a Musical	Merrily We Roll Along	Won	
2026	Best Leading Actor in a Play	Every Brilliant Thing	Nominated	

== Other theatre awards ==
Organizations	Year	Category	Work	Result	Ref.
Broadway Audience Awards	2009	Favorite Leading Actor in a Broadway Play	Equus	Won	
Broadway Audience Awards	2009	Favorite Breakthrough Performance	Equus	Won	
Broadway Audience Awards	2011	Favorite Actor in a Musical	How to Succeed in Business Without Really Trying	Won	
Broadway Audience Awards	2011	Favorite Onstage Pair	How to Succeed in Business Without Really Trying	Won (Note: Shared with John Larroquette)	
Broadway Audience Awards	2024	Favorite Featured Actor in a Musical	Merrily We Roll Along	Won	
Broadway Audience Awards	2024	Favorite Onstage Pair	Merrily We Roll Along	Won (Note: Shared with Jonathan Groff)	
Broadway Audience Awards	2026	Favorite Leading Actor in a Play	Every Brilliant Thing	Won	
Broadway Audience Awards	2026	Performance of the Year (Play)	Every Brilliant Thing	Won	
Dorian Award	2026	Outstanding Lead Performance in a Broadway Play	Every Brilliant Thing	Nominated	
Drama Desk Award	2009	Outstanding Actor in a Play	Equus	Nominated	
Drama Desk Award	2011	Outstanding Actor in a Musical	How to Succeed in Business Without Really Trying	Nominated	
Drama Desk Award	2014	Outstanding Actor in a Play	The Cripple of Inishmaan	Nominated	
Drama Desk Award	2023	Outstanding Featured Performance in a Musical	Merrily We Roll Along	Nominated	
Drama League Award	2009	Distinguished Performance Award	Equus	Nominated	
Drama League Award	2011	Distinguished Performance Award	How to Succeed in Business Without Really Trying	Nominated	
Drama League Award	2017	Distinguished Performance Award	Privacy	Nominated	
Drama League Award	2024	Distinguished Performance Award	Merrily We Roll Along	Nominated	
Drama League Award	2026	Distinguished Performance Award	Every Brilliant Thing	Nominated	
Outer Critics Circle Award	2011	Outstanding Actor in a Musical	How to Succeed in Business Without Really Trying	Nominated	
Outer Critics Circle Award	2023	Outstanding Featured Performer in an Off-Broadway Musical	Merrily We Roll Along	Nominated	
Outer Critics Circle Award	2026	Outstanding Solo Performance	Every Brilliant Thing	Won	

== Audience awards ==
Organizations	Year	Category	Work	Result	Ref.
MTV Movie Awards	2002	Best Breakthrough Male Performance	Harry Potter and the Philosopher's Stone	Nominated	
MTV Movie Awards	2007	Best On-Screen Team (Note: Shared with Rupert Grint and Emma Watson)	Harry Potter and the Goblet of Fire	Nominated	
MTV Movie Awards	2007	Best Hero	Harry Potter and the Goblet of Fire	Nominated	
MTV Movie Awards	2008	Best Kiss (Note: Shared with Katie Leung)	Harry Potter and the Order of the Phoenix	Nominated	
MTV Movie Awards	2010	Best Male Performance	Harry Potter and the Half-Blood Prince	Nominated	
MTV Movie Awards	2010	Global Superstar	N/A	Nominated	
MTV Movie Awards	2011	Best Kiss (Note: Shared with Emma Watson)	Harry Potter and the Deathly Hallows – Part 1	Nominated	
MTV Movie Awards	2011	Best Fight	Harry Potter and the Deathly Hallows – Part 1	Nominated	
MTV Movie Awards	2011	Best Male Performance	Harry Potter and the Deathly Hallows – Part 1	Nominated	
MTV Movie Awards	2012	Best Male Performance	Harry Potter and the Deathly Hallows – Part 2	Nominated	
MTV Movie Awards	2012	Best Cast (Note: Shared with Rupert Grint, Emma Watson, and Tom Felton)	Harry Potter and the Deathly Hallows – Part 2	Won	
MTV Movie Awards	2012	Best Hero	Harry Potter and the Deathly Hallows – Part 2	Won	
MTV Movie Awards	2022	Best Villain	The Lost City	Won	
Nickelodeon Kids' Choice Awards	2012	Favorite Movie Actor	Harry Potter and the Deathly Hallows – Part 2	Nominated	
People's Choice Awards	2011	Favorite Ensemble Movie Cast (Note: Shared with the cast)	Harry Potter and the Deathly Hallows – Part 2	Won	
People's Choice Awards	2011	Favorite Movie Actor	Harry Potter and the Deathly Hallows – Part 2	Nominated	
People's Choice Awards	2011	Favorite Movie Star Under 25	Harry Potter and the Deathly Hallows – Part 2	Nominated	
Scream Awards	2011	Best Fantasy Actor	Harry Potter and the Deathly Hallows – Part 2	Won	
Scream Awards	2011	Best Ensemble	Harry Potter and the Deathly Hallows – Part 2	Nominated	
Teen Choice Awards	2001	Choice Breakout Movie Actor	Harry Potter and the Philosopher's Stone	Won	
Teen Choice Awards	2010	Choice Movie Actor – Sci-Fi/Fantasy	Harry Potter and the Deathly Hallows – Part 1	Nominated	
Teen Choice Awards	2010	Choice Movie: Liplock	Harry Potter and the Deathly Hallows – Part 1	Won	
Teen Choice Awards	2011	Choice Summer Movie Star: Male	Harry Potter and the Deathly Hallows – Part 2	Won	
Teen Choice Awards	2019	Choice Comedy TV Actor	Miracle Workers	Nominated	

== Miscellaneous awards ==
Organizations	Year	Category	Work	Result	Ref.
Canadian Screen Awards	2014	Best Actor	The F Word (What If?)	Nominated	
Chlotrudis Awards	2014	Best Actor	Kill Your Darlings	Nominated	
Empire Awards	2008	Best Actor	Harry Potter and the Order of the Phoenix	Nominated	
Empire Awards	2013	Empire Hero Award	N/A	Won	
Catalunya Film Festival	2016	Best Actor	Swiss Army Man	Won	
Glamour Awards	2013	Man of the Year		Won	
National Film Awards UK	2017	Best Actor	Now You See Me 2	Nominated	
National Movie Awards	2007	Best Male Performance	Harry Potter and the Order of the Phoenix	Won	
Saturn Award	2007	Best Performance by a Younger Actor	Harry Potter and the Order of the Phoenix	Nominated	
Shanghai International TV Festival	2007	Best Performance by an Actor in a Television Film	My Boy Jack	Nominated	
J-14's Teen Icon Awards	2010	Iconic Movie Star		Nominated	
Do Something Awards	2011	Movie Star		Nominated	
Hollywood Women's Press Club	2001	Male Youth Discovery of the Year	Harry Potter and the Philosopher's Stone	Won	
Chainsaw Awards	2013	Best Actor	The Woman in Black	Nominated	
Chainsaw Awards	2014	Best Actor	Horns	Won	
OFTA Television Award	2002	Best Youth Performance	Harry Potter and the Philosopher's Stone	Nominated	
OFTA Television Award	2007	Best Guest Actor in a Comedy Series	Extras	Nominated	
