= Gringo Trails =

- Official Poster
- Directed by: Pegi Vail
- Release date: October 19, 2013
- Languages: English; Spanish

Gringo Trails is a 2013 feature-length documentary film directed by anthropologist Pegi Vail of New York University. The film follows the positive and negative impacts of travel and tourism on numerous communities across the globe, including Thailand, Bolivia, Mali (Timbuktu) and Bhutan, documenting how communities thrive, adapt, or deteriorate in the face of mass tourism, "one of the most powerful globalizing forces of our time."

== Yossi Ghinsberg ==
The film features Israeli adventurer and author, Yossi Ghinsberg, who, in 1981, survived for three weeks after being stranded in the Bolivian jungle. In Gringo Trails, Ghinsberg returns to the jungle and the community who assisted in his rescue, and discusses how they have adapted to the influx of tourism in the wake of his own survival story, and assists them in the development of their own ecolodge, Chalalan. Ghinsberg's story is the subject of Jungle, a survival thriller film directed by Greg McLean and starring Daniel Radcliffe in the role of Ghinsberg.

== Costas Christ ==
The film also features Costas Christ, editor-at-large and award-winning travel writer for National Geographic. In the film, Christ, a proponent of sustainable tourism, discusses his relationship with the island community of Ko Pha Ngan in southern Thailand, which he inadvertently popularised as a tourist destination after discovering its relatively untouched beauty in the late 1970s. Christ cites the mass ecological damage which has befallen the island since the 1980s in the wake of the escalating popularity of the island's now notorious Full Moon Party with international tourists and backpackers, held monthly on the island's Haad Rin beach.

== Reviews ==
On review aggregator Rotten Tomatoes, the film holds an approval rating of 71% based on seven reviews, with an average rating of 7.42/10. Film publications such as The Hollywood Reporter, and Film Journal International were amongst those to praise both the quality of the film and its central thesis. The film also generated a lot of positive press among numerous international travel publications, such as Travel Weekly, National Geographic Traveler, Condé Nast Traveler, and Outside Magazine, the latter of which described the documentary as "an important and moving film."
