= Yossi Ghinsberg =

Israeli adventurer, author and speaker

- יוסי גינסברג
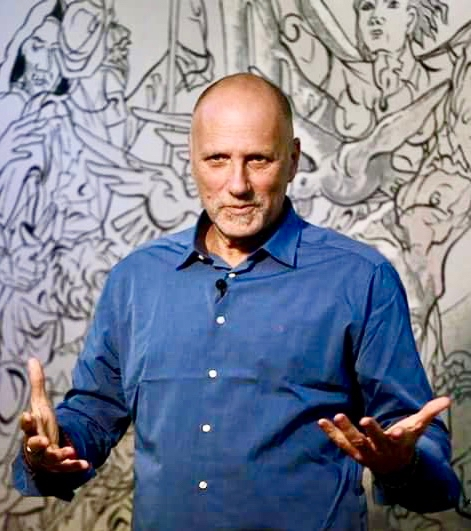
- Yossi Ghinsberg speaking in 2016.
- Born: Yosseph Ghinsberg; 25 April 1959 (age 67); Tel Aviv, Israel
- Education: Tel Aviv University
- Occupations: Entrepreneur, author, motivational speaker
- Children: 4

Yosseph "Yossi" Ghinsberg (Hebrew: יוסי גינסברג; born 25 April 1959) is an Israeli adventurer, author, entrepreneur, humanitarian, and motivational speaker, now based in Byron Bay, Australia. Ghinsberg is most known for his survival story in an uncharted part of the Bolivian Amazon jungle for three weeks in 1981. Ghinsberg's survival story was enacted in the 2017 psychological thriller Jungle, starring Daniel Radcliffe as Yossi Ghinsberg where he was separated from his mochileros (Spanish for “backpackers”) friends. Ghinsberg's story was also featured in the documentary series I Shouldn't Be Alive on Discovery Channel.

== Amazon travel ==
After completing his service in the Israeli navy, Ghinsberg, inspired by the book Papillon by Henri Charrière, which detailed that author's experiences as an escaped convict, became determined to find Charrière and ask for his blessing to follow in his footsteps. Ghinsberg had briefly returned from an Africa to Mexico trip and longed for the rainforest immersion experience. He worked several jobs to save the money to travel to South America and dreamed of exploring the uninhabited heart of the Amazon jungle. By the time Ghinsberg was finally able to travel to South America, Charrière had died, and the tribes Ghinsberg was interested in "discovering" were already in contact with outsiders.

Ghinsberg hitchhiked from Venezuela to Colombia, where he met Markus Stamm, a teacher from Switzerland, in the midst of his expeditions, and the pair became good friends and traveled together to La Paz, Bolivia. There, Ghinsberg met Karl Ruprechter, a mysterious Austrian who claimed to be a geologist. Ruprechter told Ghinsberg that he was planning an expedition into the uncharted Amazon in Bolivia, in search of gold in a remote, indigenous Tacana village.

Ghinsberg, who sought out the opportunity to explore the unexplored areas of the Amazon, immediately joined Ruprechter in his journey, along with Stamm and another of Ghinsberg's new acquaintances, Kevin Gale, an American photographer. The four of them, never having had prior contact with each other, delved into a Bolivian adventure seeking gold.

Twenty-two-year-old Ghinsberg and his two friends followed Ruprechter by plane to Apolo, La Paz, and from there traveled down to the Tuichi River and to a local village called Asariamas, at the confluence of rivers Tuichi–Asariamas. There, they restocked food and supplies. Then, according to Karl's stories about having visited an ancient indigenous village hidden deep within the rainforest – inhabited by "primitives" who had seen very few white men in their lifetime – the group began traveling up the Asariamas River, and across the mountains on their way there. Eventually, low on supplies, they had to eat monkeys. Stamm refused to eat monkeys and inevitably grew physically weaker. Under these conditions, they decided to abandon their journey and return to Asariamas.

Back at Asariamas, Karl told them about his new plan: sailing on a raft down the Tuichi River to a small gold quarry called Curiplaya, on the river bed, and from there downriver to Rurrenabaque, near the Beni River, and then return to La Paz.

With the villagers' help, they built the raft, pursued their new route downriver, and arrived at the confluence of rivers Tuichi–Ipurama. There, Ruprechter suddenly told them about San Pedro Canyon – a dangerous series of rapids, waterfalls, and boulders unsuitable for boating – and the fact that he could not swim, and thus refused to continue on the trip. His deceit and betrayal led to distrust within the group and ended with the group's splitting up: Gale and Ghinsberg decided to continue rafting downriver to Rurrenabaque, while Ruprechter and Stamm decided to walk up the Ipurama River to Ipurama village, near the river's source, and return from there to Apolo. The four men resolved to reconvene before Christmas, in La Paz.

As Ghinsberg and Gale's raft neared a waterfall, they lost control and became separated. Gale made it to shore, but Ghinsberg floated downriver and over the waterfall. He spent four days traveling upriver in search of Gale before finally coming to the realization that he was stranded alone in the jungle.

Ghinsberg spent the next three weeks lost in an uncharted part of the Amazon. He survived completely alone in nature on the edge of his life.

In the second week, there was a flood in the area, and Ghinsberg almost drowned. He sank into a bog twice. For the subsequent five days, Ghinsberg had no food but what he found, and his foot began to rot from fungi. According to Ghinsberg, he had hallucinations of a woman with whom he slept each night.

Ghinsberg made his way back to the river and met Gale, along with indigenous people who had organized a search and rescue mission led by Abelardo "Tico" Tudela. They found Ghinsberg three days into their search, three weeks after Ghinsberg was first declared missing. He spent the next three months recovering in hospital.

Ruprechter and Stamm did not return to La Paz. Despite attempts by several rescue missions, they were never found. Gale was later told by the Austrian embassy that Ruprechter was not a geologist, but a criminal, wanted by Interpol.

=== Movie adaptation ===
In 2014, Arclight Films announced that they would be adapting Ghinsberg's book Jungle: A Harrowing True Story of Survival. Jungle, starring Daniel Radcliffe, was released on 17 October 2017 after being filmed for six weeks in April and May 2016, in the Colombian sites of Tobia, Guaduas, and Honda, and in Mount Tamborine, Queensland, Australia.

Jungle follows Ghinsberg's meeting of his three travel companions and the three weeks he spent in the Bolivian jungle without any supplies or help.

== Career ==
Ghinsberg served three years in the Israeli Navy on the Red Sea. During these years, he befriended the Bedouin of the Sinai Desert and learned more about their nomad culture. To collect money to travel, Ghinsberg worked multiple jobs including construction work in Norway, fishing in Alaska, and loading and unloading trucks in New York City.

Ten years after almost losing his life in the Amazon, he went back to the Bolivian jungle. Ghinsberg put the Tacana-Quechua people of the village of San José de Uchupiamonas in touch with the Inter-American Development Bank, which gave a $1.25 million grant to build a solar-powered ecolodge in the jungle, and to train the local people how to manage it. He stayed there from 1992 to 1995 with the natives and helped them build and operate Chalalan, an ecolodge in Bolivia's Madidi National Park. He also put the people of San Jose in touch with Conservation International, a Washington environmental group that has pioneered much of the ecotourism field and was instrumental in getting 1,800,000 hectares (4,500,000 acres) around San Jose declared as the Madidi National Park. Ghinsberg also worked on protecting intellectual properties of indigenous people of that region. Ghinsberg co-founded EthnoBios, a biodiversity prospecting company local to the Amazon basin, and taught the indigenous people how to protect their intellectual properties.

Ghinsberg was recruited in 1995 by The Center for Investigation & Treatment of Addiction (CITA) International to serve as Vice President for Development. In this capacity, Ghinsberg has founded 12 centers for the treatment and research of opiate addiction in different parts of the world from Mexico to China. In 1999, Ghinsberg left CITA International and moved to Australia to open his own treatment center. In Australia, Ghinsberg founded The Alma Libre Foundation dedicated to assisting opiate addicts and providing rehabilitation options for re-integration into society. In 2001, at the height of the Intifada, he organized a music festival in Israel to promote Israeli-Palestinian reconciliation.

In 2009, Ghinsberg returned to Israel and established Collecteco, a design label for interior and landscape designs displaying a gallery of furniture made from recycled materials. His development team is based in Ramallah.

He co-founded Headbox, a startup that has built an application to integrate social media activity and communication networks into one feed. Ghinsberg is a co-founder and currently the CEO at Blinq.me, a Silicon Valley–based tech-startup financed by 500 Startups's acceleration program.

== Publicity ==
Ghinsberg wrote his first book, titled Back from Tuichi, in 1984. The book became popular in Israel and sold millions of copies, and it has been translated into 15 languages and published in several countries under different names, including Heart of the Amazon (Macmillen) Back from Tuichi (Random House), and Lost in the Jungle (Summersdale). In 2008, he wrote his second book, titled Laws of the Jungle: Jaguars Don't Need Self-Help Books. In concurrence with the movie, Summersdale will re-release its book Lost in the Jungle as Jungle in 2017.

Ghinsberg has been covered on Fox News Latino, CNN, TEDx, BBC America, BBC World Service, LA Times, and LinkedIn. He was ranked one of the Top 20 Most Inspiring People on Twitter in 2012. Ghinsberg was featured on Larry King Live! in the "I Shouldn't Be Alive" Discovery Channel documentary and channel series, which aired 27 April 2006 on CNN. He spoke at TEDxBratislava in 2010, his talk entitled "On Thinking Outside of the Box" about his struggle for survival in the Amazon and the insights he took away from the experience. Ghinsberg featured in the 2013 travel documentary Gringo Trails by documentary filmmaker, Pegi Vail. In the film, Ghinsberg returns to the Bolivian jungle and the community who assisted in his rescue, and discusses how they have adapted to the influx of tourists in the wake of his survival story. Ghinsberg was covered on the front page of The Jerusalem Post's 22 April 2016 edition. In September 2016, Ghinsberg returned to Bolivia to speak at the Solon Foundation and El Bala about his Amazon survival experiences.

== Personal life and education ==
Ghinsberg was born and raised in Ramat Gan, Israel, to parents who survived the Holocaust. When he was 18, he joined the Israeli Navy as part of mandatory military service and served for three years stationed in the Red Sea.

After returning from the Amazon, Ghinsberg graduated from Tel Aviv University in Israel with degrees in Jewish Philosophy and Business Administration. Ghinsberg also studied the Kabbalah traditions in authentic environments and continues to study religions of the past and the present, including the Ancients, the Classics, Eastern, Contemporary, and the Shamanic Path. Ghinsberg lived and worked in the Amazon from 1992 to 1995. In 1997, Ghinsberg moved to Australia to help establish clinics that offer drug and alcohol detoxification recovery and treatment programs. He has married three times and has four children: Mia, Cayam, Nissim, and Shalem. In 2009, Ghinsberg returned to Israel with his wife and his children. Ghinsberg and his family have lived in Israel, Australia, and the United States.

== Autobiographical works ==
- Ghinsberg, Y (1996). Back From Tuichi: the Harrowing Life-and-Death Story of Survival In The Amazon Rainforest. Random House. ISBN 067942458X.
- Ghinsberg, Yossi (2007). Laws of the jungle: jaguars don't need self-help books. Boomerang New Media. ISBN 978-0977171910. OCLC 71819966.
- Ghinsberg, Yossi (2017). Jungle: a harrowing true story of survival in the amazon. W W Norton. ISBN 978-1510718616. OCLC 949987304.
