= Chalalan =

Eco-lodge in Madidi National Park, Bolivia

Chalalan Ecolodge
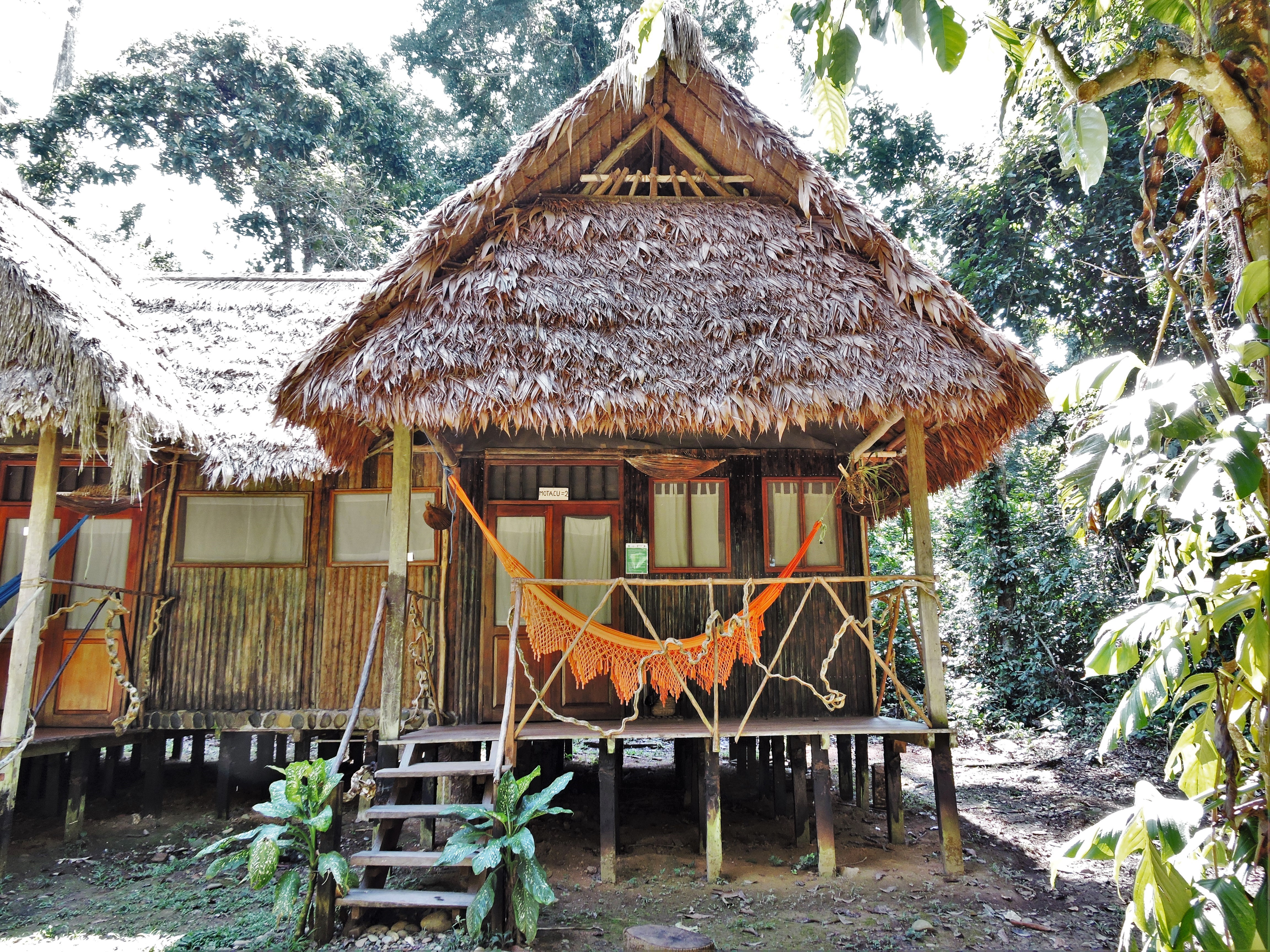
- Type: Indigenous Ecotourism
- Industry: Tourism
- Genre: Jungle ecolodge
- Founded: 1999; 27 years ago
- Headquarters: Rurrenabaque, Bolivia
- Services: Lodging, interpretive guidance., food, river transport, Canoeing on lake and sport fishing.
- Owner: Indigenous people of San José de Uchupiamonas
- Website: https://www.amazonadventures.com/chalalan-eco-lodge.html

Chalalán is an ecological lodge of the Indigenous People of San José de Uchupiamonas dedicated to ethnic ecotourism. It is located in the Madidi National Park in Bolivia. The cabins are located in the vicinity of Chalalán Lake, on the south bank of the Tuichi River, about 100 km south west of Rurrenabaque.

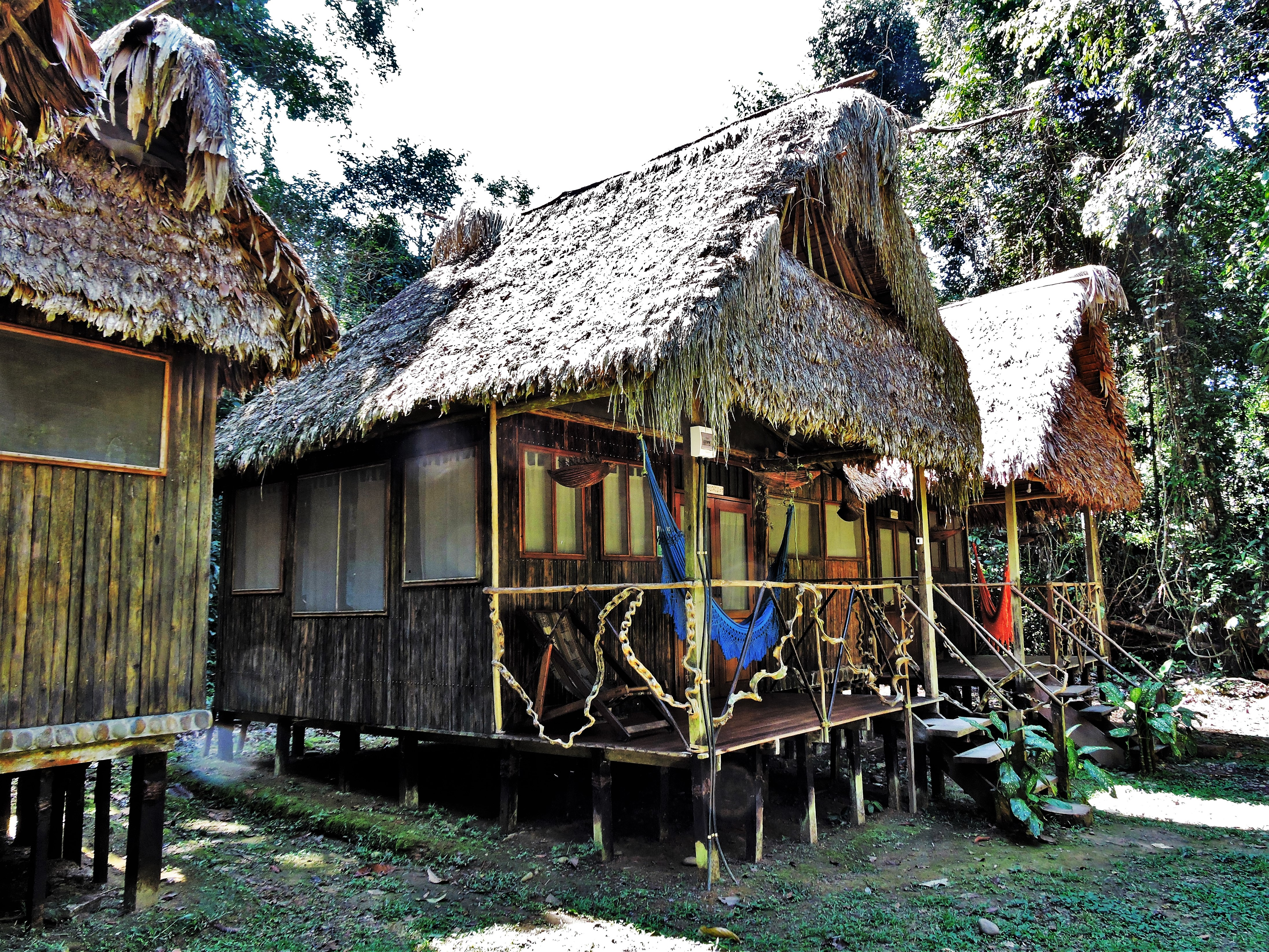
Chalalan Ecolodge

== Origins ==
Rurrenabaque is a coastal port where there has been economic and cultural exchange since at least the Inca period. For this reason, the Indigenous People of San José de Uchupiamonas retain the Quechua language that is typical of highlands but also the Tacana language, typical of the Amazon of Bolivia. This trade between the highlands and the Amazon continued during the colony and the republic, attracting visitors from other regions of the world. Among them are adventurers such as Yossi Ghinsberg, who in 1981 participated in a failed expedition with Karl Ruprechter, Marcus Stamm and Kevin Gale, who were lost and separated. Gale was rescued by Uchupiamonas or "Josesanos" (Joshuaians) and was transferred to Rurrenabaque, where he recovered and began the search for Ghinsberg, who was rescued after three weeks of surviving alone and without equipment in the jungle. The friendship between Ghinsberg and the Josesanos led them to generate an ecotourism project aimed at improving the quality of life of these indigenous people and conserving biodiversity. The project was supported by the Inter-American Development Bank and Conservation International. The project concluded in 1999 with the constitution of Chalalán as a community venture.

=== Local administration ===
The lodge is now independently run by the indigenous population of San Jose de Uchupiamonas. Chalalan is highly recommended for travelers who like wildlife spotting, photography and educational tours. Lake Chalalan and the trip along the Tuichi River offer some of the most spectacular experiences in Bolivia. It is great place to see wild macaws, white-lipped peccaries, Brazilian tapirs, several species of monkeys and even the elusive jaguar. The lodge was built using indigenous architectural techniques and local materials. Tours include exploring the trail system as well as canoe explorations.

== Location ==
Chalalán is located in the Madidi National Park, within the territory of the Indigenous People of San José de Uchupiamonas, near Lake Chalalán, near the south bank of the Tuichi River, 100 km from the city of Rurrenabaque. Access is by waterway, and is navigated in wooden boats with outboard motors. The trip from Rurrenabaque takes from 5 to 6 hours, depending on the conditions of the river, while the return takes around 3 hours, due to the river current. Coordinates 14.3778°S 67.9283°W.

== Characteristics ==
The lodge has been built based on traditional tacana techniques, with overgrown wooden floors, chonta palm tree (Iriartea deltoidea) walls and jatata (Geonoma deversa) roofing. Chalalan has an energy matrix based on solar panels and a wastewater treatment system. The main activity is the walk through paths of environmental interpretation guided by members of the indigenous community of San José de Uchupiamonas, rowing canoe trips through Lake Chalalan and visits to the indigenous community.

Eventually, scientific research, workshops and seminars are carried out. Other frequent activities are the observation of birds and sport fishing.

=== Fauna ===
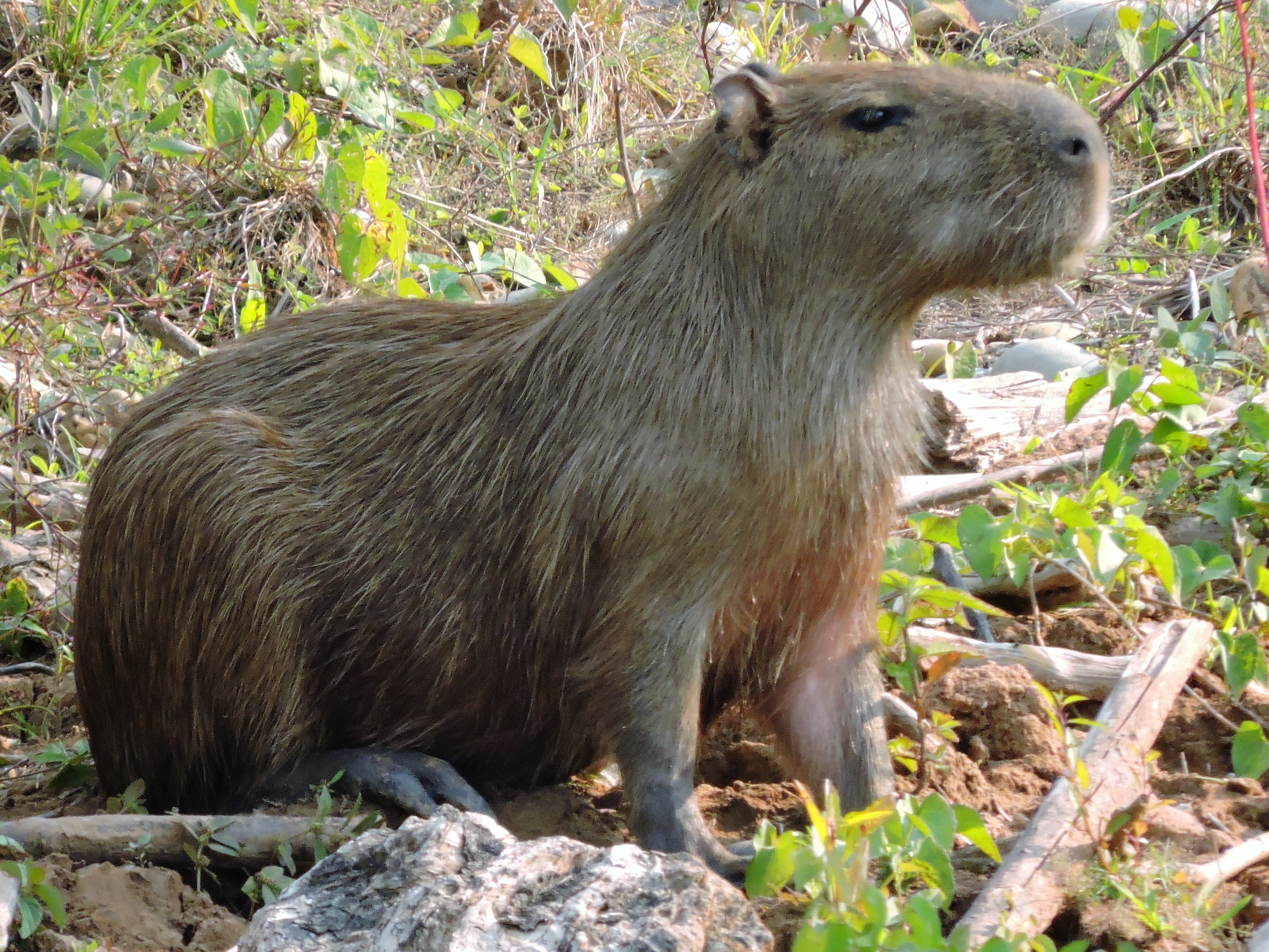
Capybara

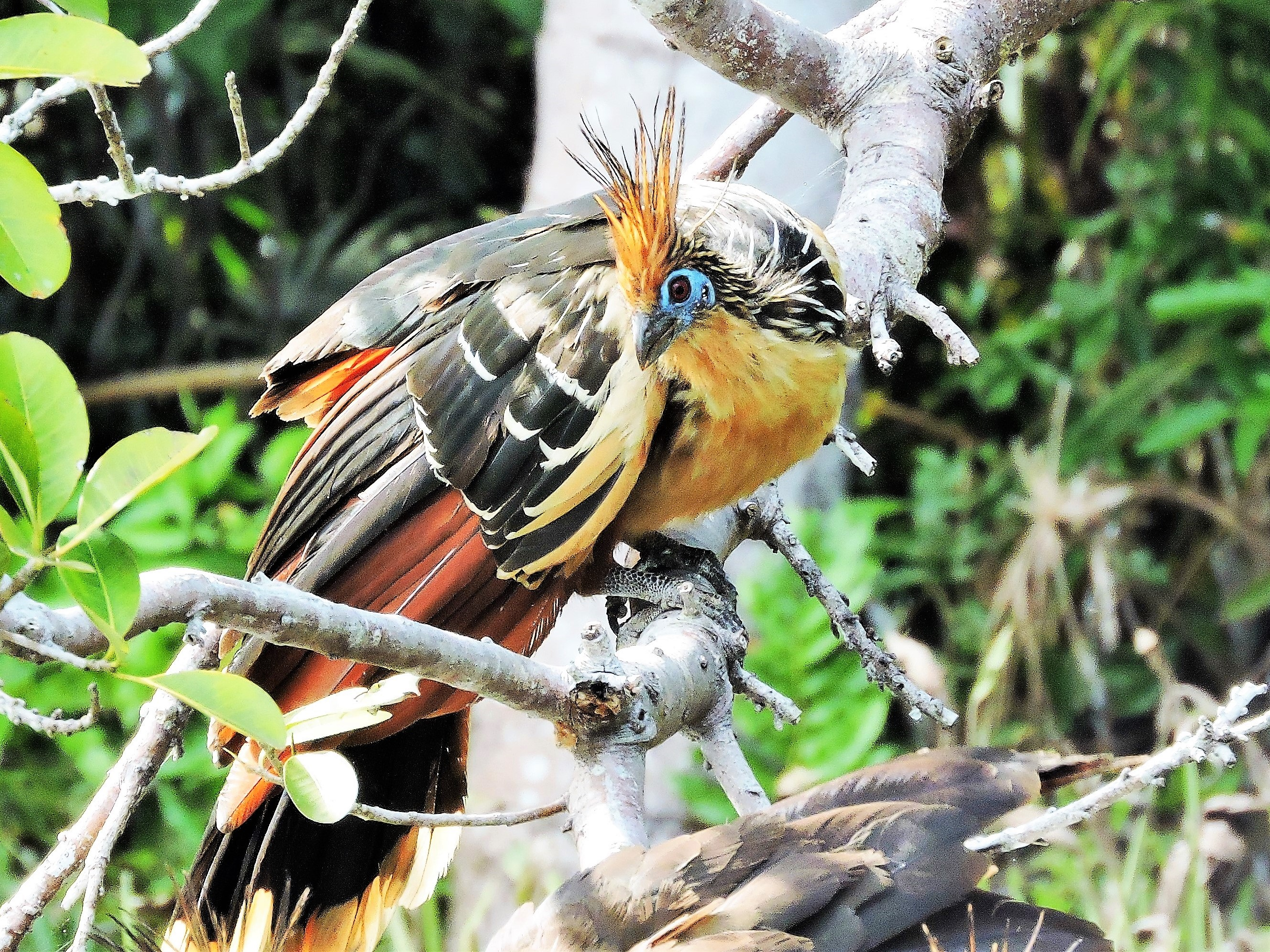
Hoatzin

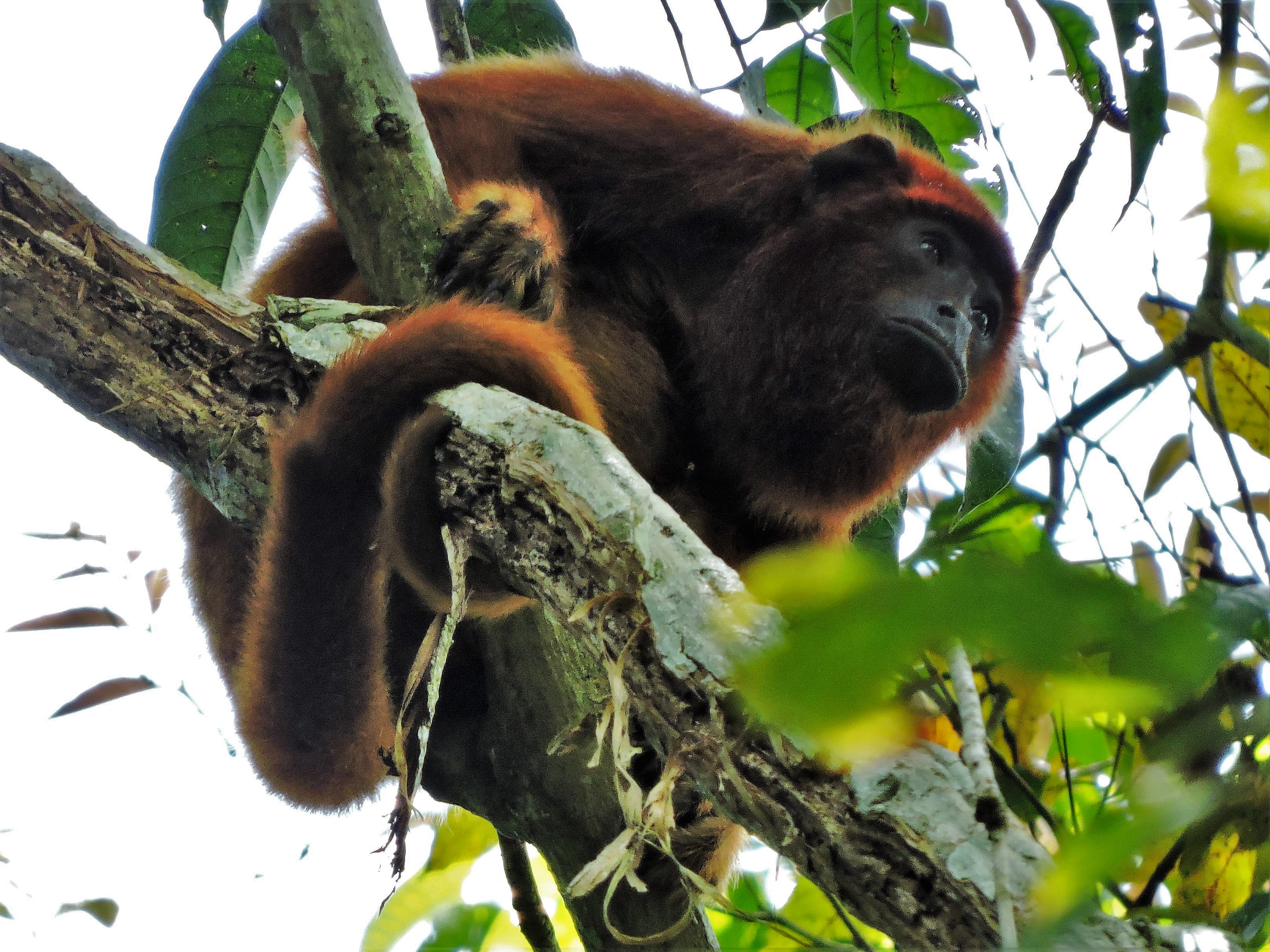
Red howler

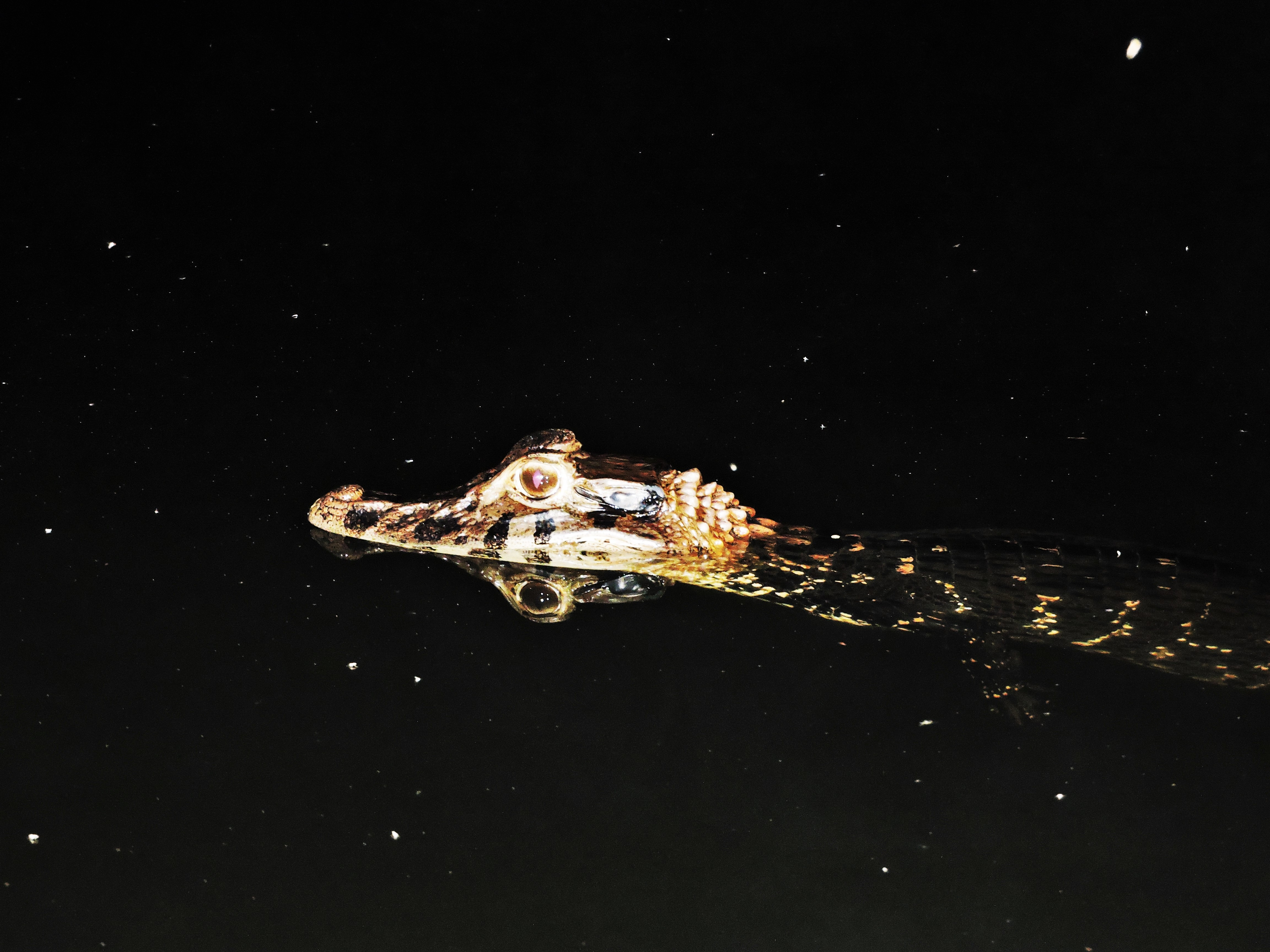
Yacare

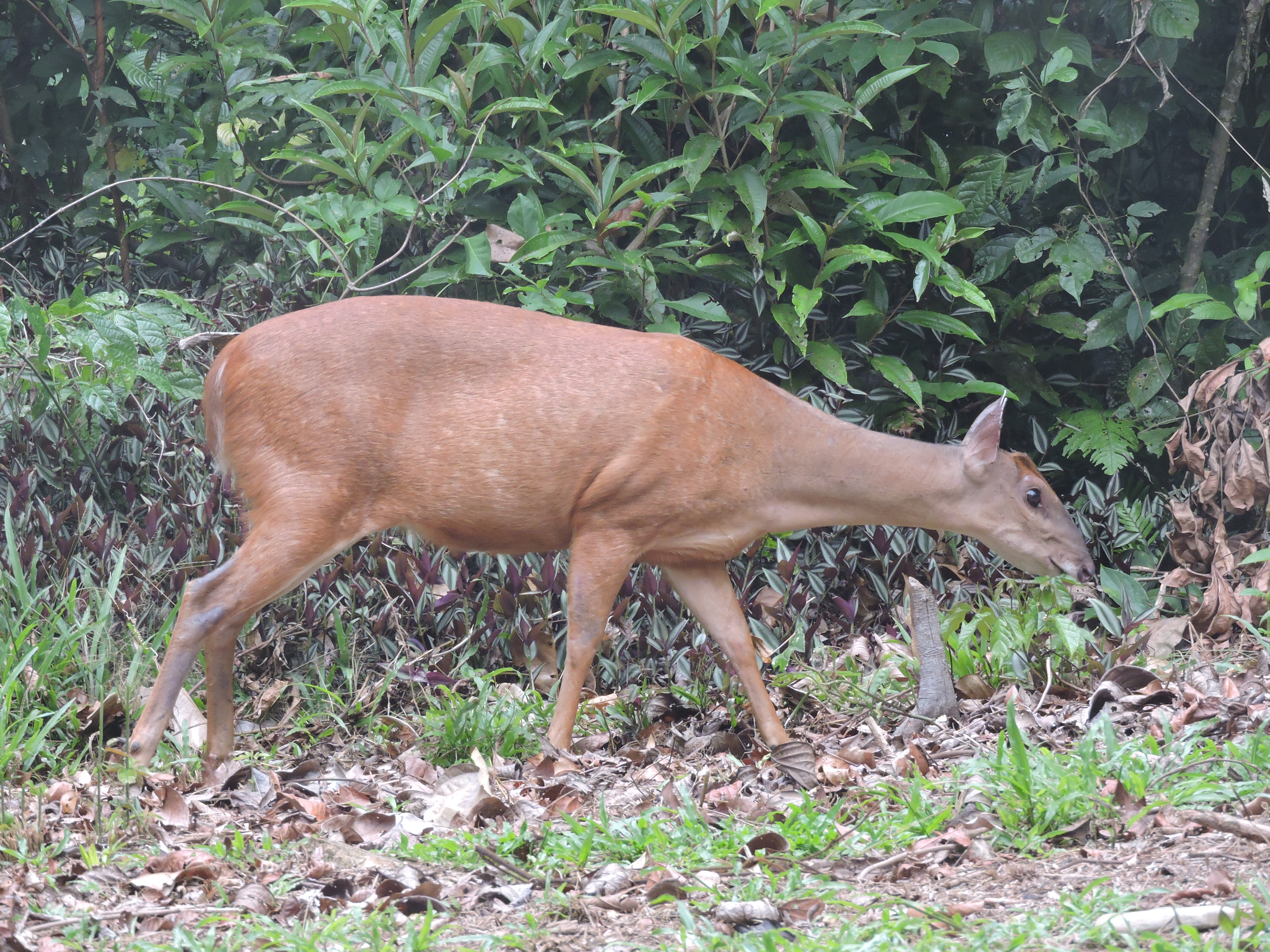
Mazama

One of the main activities is the observation of fauna in the paths of environmental interpretation. Chalalán represents and conserves a segment of the ecosystems of the Madidi National Park, corresponding to the foot of mount, the forest of low mountains of the Tropical Andes. Some common species are: squirrel monkey, whistling monkey, howler monkey, spider monkey, olingo, deer, capybara, mountain zeros like the pecari and occasionally sighted jaguars and pumas. Birding is also possible; sereres, herons, fishermen, macaws, eagles, hummingbirds, carpenters, and species associated with bodies of water are frequent.

== Governance ==
The lodge is owned by the Indigenous People of San José de Uchupiamonas, which designates a directory to which management responsibilities are delegated. The contact staff is also from the community. The enterprise has been self-sustaining and independent since 2000, since then it has operated uninterruptedly

== In popular culture ==
The 2013 documentary film, Gringo Trails, features an interview with Chalalán Ecolodge's, Guido Mamani, promoting the project as a main solution towards sustainable tourism.

== See also ==
- Lago Chalalán
- es:Parque nacional Madidi
