= Chalalán Lake =

Lake in La Paz Department, Bolivia

Lake Chalalán
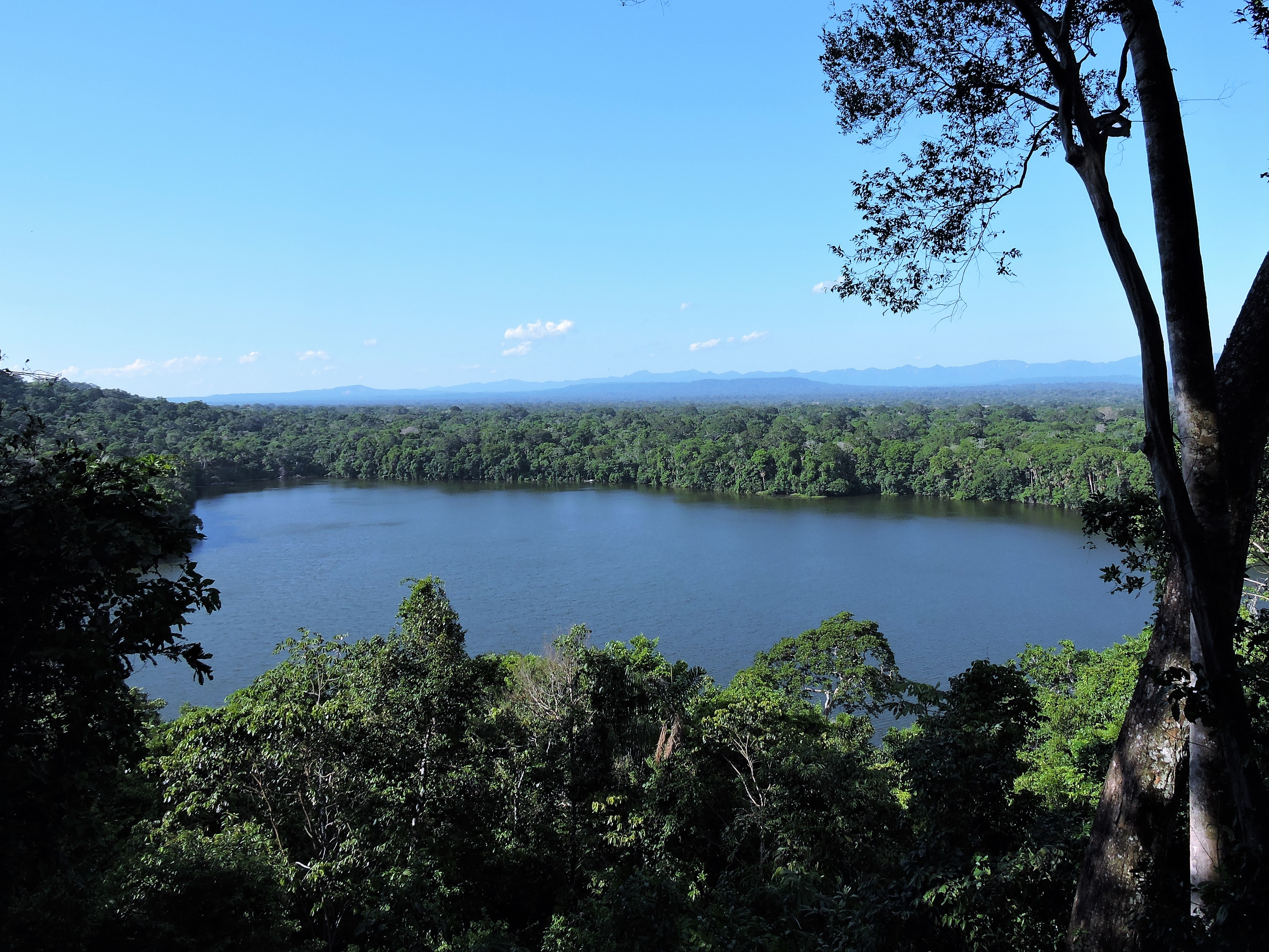
- Lake Chalalan

- Location within Bolivia Location within South America
- Interactive map of Lake Chalalán
- Location: La Paz Department, Franz Tamayo Province, Apolo Municipality, Atén Canton
- Coordinates: 14.429°S 67.921°W
- Basin countries: Bolivia
- Surface area: 0.4 km^{2} (0.15 sq mi)
- Surface elevation: 380 m (1,250 ft)

Lake Chalalán is an Amazonian lake, located north in the La Paz Department, in the Madidi National Park, and within the Community Territory of the indigenous people of San José de Uchupiamonas in Bolivia.

It is at an elevation of 380 m. It has about 0.97 km long and 0.61 km wide and an area of 40 hectares or 0.40 km^{2}.

This lake is used for community-based ecotourism, on its banks is located Chalalan, a venture of the indigenous people of San José de Uchupiamonas and is visited by more than 1,000 people each year.
