= Daniel Radcliffe =

English actor (born 1989)

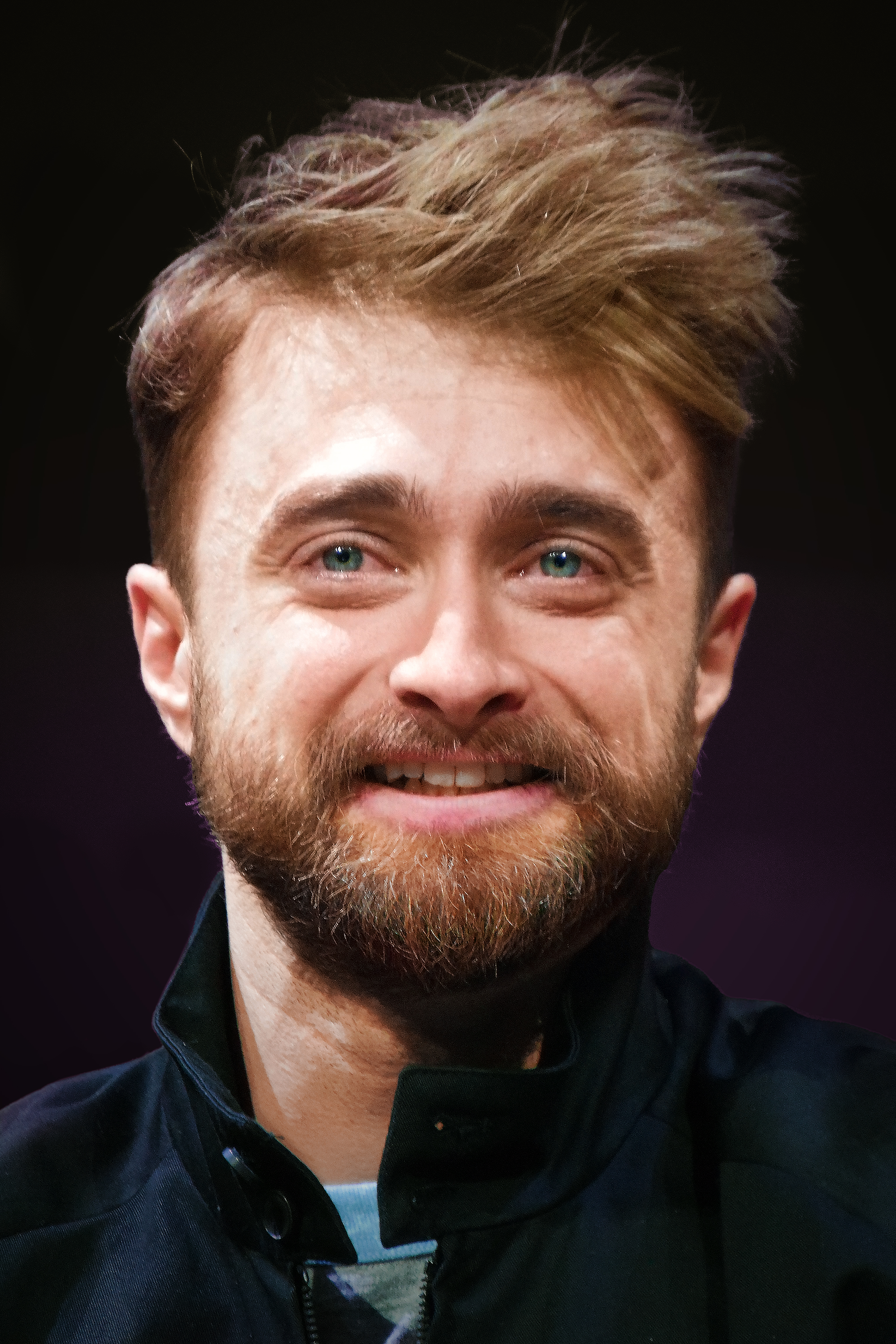
- Radcliffe in 2022
- Born: Daniel Jacob Radcliffe; 23 July 1989 (age 37); London, England
- Other names: Jacob Gershon (pen name)
- Occupation: Actor
- Years active: 2001–present
- Works: Full list
- Partner: Erin Darke (2012–present)
- Children: 1
- Awards: Full list
- Website: www.danieljradcliffe.com

Daniel Jacob Radcliffe (born 23 July 1989) is an English actor best known for portraying Harry Potter in all eight films of the Harry Potter film series from 2001 to 2011. Radcliffe's films as a leading actor have grossed over $8.38 billion worldwide. His accolades include a Critics' Choice Award and a Tony Award, in addition to nominations for a BAFTA Award, two Grammy Awards, and a Primetime Emmy Award. He was featured on the Forbes 30 Under 30 Europe list of 2019.

Radcliffe branched out to stage acting in 2007, starring in the West End and Broadway productions of Equus. He returned to Broadway in the musical How to Succeed in Business Without Really Trying (2011), earning a Grammy Award nomination. His other Broadway roles include Martin McDonagh's drama The Cripple of Inishmaan (2014), Stephen Sondheim's musical Merrily We Roll Along (2023), the latter of which earned him a Tony Award for Best Featured Actor in a Musical and another Grammy nomination, and a second Tony Award-nominated role in Every Brilliant Thing (2026). He also starred in the London revivals of Tom Stoppard's Rosencrantz and Guildenstern Are Dead (2017) and Samuel Beckett's Endgame (2020).

Radcliffe also expanded his film roles, acting in a variety of genres such as the horror film The Woman in Black (2012), surreal drama Swiss Army Man (2016), thriller Now You See Me 2 (2016), and comedy The Lost City (2022). He also portrayed Allen Ginsberg in the biopic Kill Your Darlings (2013) and "Weird Al" Yankovic in the musical parody Weird: The Al Yankovic Story (2022). The latter earned him nominations for a Primetime Emmy Award and a British Academy Television Award. He also played multiple roles in the anthology comedy series Miracle Workers from 2019 to 2023.

Radcliffe has contributed to various charities, including Demelza Hospice Care for Children and the Trevor Project. The latter awarded him its Hero Award in 2011 for his advocacy with LGBTQ youth. Radcliffe is in a long-term relationship with actress Erin Darke since 2012 with whom he has a son.

== Early life and education ==
Daniel Jacob Radcliffe was born on 23 July 1989 at Queen Charlotte's and Chelsea Hospital in the Hammersmith district of London, the only child of casting agent Marcia Jeannine Gresham (née Jacobson) and literary agent Alan George Radcliffe. His Jewish mother, born in South Africa, traces her ancestry to Ashkenazi Jewish immigrants from Germany, Lithuania, Poland, and Russia, and was raised in the English town of Westcliff-on-Sea in Essex. (Note: Attributed to multiple references:) His Northern Irish father was raised in a "very working-class" Protestant family in Banbridge in County Down. In 2019, he explored both sides of his family history in the BBC genealogy series Who Do You Think You Are?. Radcliffe's parents had both acted as children. As a casting agent, his mother was involved in BBC productions including The Inspector Lynley Mysteries.

Radcliffe was educated at three private schools for boys in London: Redcliffe School, Sussex House School, and the City of London School. After the release of the first Harry Potter film, attending school proved difficult for him as some fellow pupils became hostile, though he states they were just trying to "have a crack at the kid that plays Harry Potter" rather than acting out of jealousy. As his acting career began to consume his schedule, he continued his education through on-set tutors. He has admitted to not being a very good student, considering school useless and finding the work "really difficult". He achieved A grades in the three AS level exams that he took in 2006, but decided to take a break from education and did not attend university. Part of his reasoning was he already knew he wanted to be an actor and screenwriter, and it would be difficult to have a normal university experience.

== Career ==
=== Early career and Harry Potter (2001–2011) ===
Radcliffe first expressed a desire to act at age five. After one of his mother's casting agent friends secured him an audition, he made his acting debut at age ten in BBC One's two-part adaptation of the Charles Dickens novel David Copperfield (1999), portraying the title character as a young boy. He made his film debut in The Tailor of Panama (2001), an American film based on John le Carré's 1996 spy novel, which was a moderate commercial success.

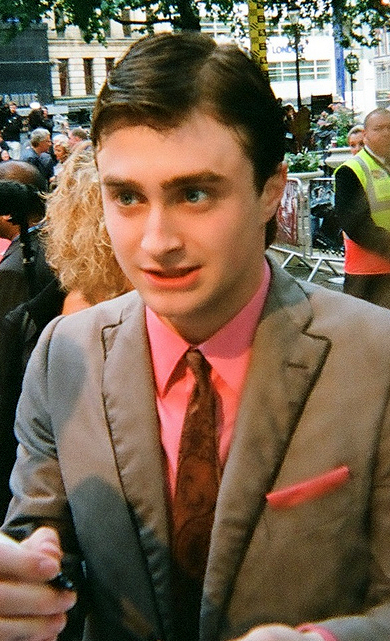
Radcliffe at the London premiere of Harry Potter and the Half-Blood Prince in 2009

In 2000, producer David Heyman met Radcliffe while he was at the theatre with his father, a well-known literary agent whom Heyman was friends with. He asked him to audition for the role of Harry Potter for the film adaptation of Harry Potter and the Philosopher's Stone, the best-selling book by British author J. K. Rowling. Rowling had been searching for an unknown British actor to personify the character, and the film's director Chris Columbus recalled thinking, "This is what I want. This is Harry Potter" after he saw a video of the young actor in David Copperfield. Eight months later, following several auditions, Radcliffe was selected to play the part. Rowling endorsed the selection, saying: "I don't think Chris Columbus could have found a better Harry." Radcliffe's parents originally turned down the offer, as they had been told that it would involve six films shot in Los Angeles. Warner Bros. instead offered Radcliffe a two-film contract with shooting in the UK; Radcliffe was unsure at the time if he would act in more than two Harry Potter films.

The release of Harry Potter and the Philosopher's Stone took place in 2001. Radcliffe received a seven-figure salary for the lead role, but asserted that the fee was "not that important" to him; his parents chose to invest the money for him. The film was highly popular and was met with positive reviews, and critics took notice of Radcliffe: "Radcliffe is the embodiment of every reader's imagination. It is wonderful to see a young hero who is so scholarly looking and filled with curiosity and who connects with very real emotions, from solemn intelligence and the delight of discovery to deep family longing," wrote Bob Graham of the San Francisco Chronicle.

A year later, Radcliffe starred in Harry Potter and the Chamber of Secrets, the second installment of the series. Reviewers were positive about the lead actors' performances but had polarising opinions on the film overall. Harry Potter and the Prisoner of Azkaban (2004) was the third film in the series. Radcliffe's performance was criticised by The New York Times film critic A. O. Scott, who felt that co-star Emma Watson had to carry him with her performance. Harry Potter and the Goblet of Fire (2005) was the second-highest grossing Harry Potter film at that point, and Radcliffe singled out the humour as a reason for the film's creative success.

The future of the Harry Potter franchise was put into question when Radcliffe, Watson, and co-star Rupert Grint hesitated to sign on to continue their roles. Around this time, Radcliffe, Watson and Grint were offered the opportunity to star in a remake of The Wizard of Oz, which they all turned down with Radcliffe saying: "I was like a karate kicking cowardly lion and I remember I was like 14 or 15 and I was like, 'I don't know a lot about the world, but this is a bad idea and it should not be made." By March 2007, Radcliffe decided to sign on for the final Harry Potter films; his signing put an end to weeks of press "speculation that he would be denied the role due to his involvement in Equus", in which he had performed nude onstage. Radcliffe reprised the role of Harry for the fifth time in Harry Potter and the Order of the Phoenix (2007). Radcliffe stated that director David Yates and co-star Imelda Staunton made Order of the Phoenix the "most fun" film to work on in the series. His performance earned him several award nominations, and he received the 2008 National Movie Award for "Best Male Performance". Radcliffe, Grint, and Watson left imprints of their hands, feet, and wands in front of Grauman's Chinese Theatre in Hollywood. Harry Potter and the Half-Blood Prince, the series' sixth instalment, was released in July 2009. Radcliffe received nominations for Best Male Performance and Global Superstar at the 2010 MTV Movie Awards.

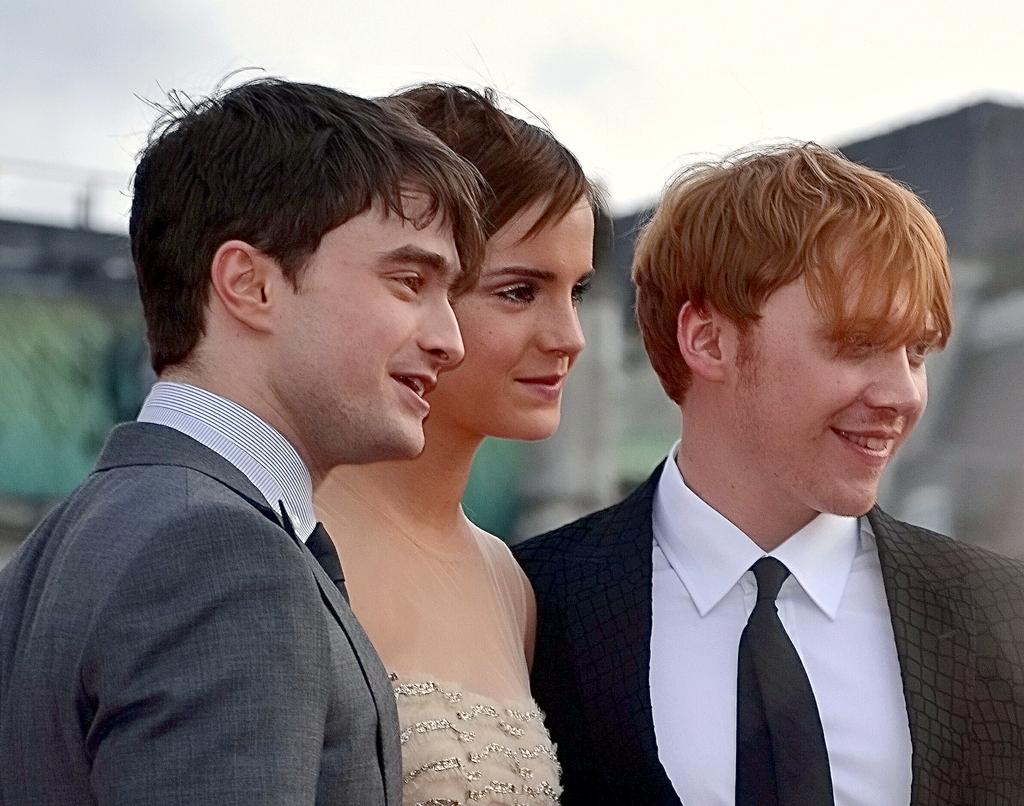
Radcliffe (left) with Emma Watson and Rupert Grint at the premiere of Harry Potter and the Deathly Hallows – Part 2 in 2011

For financial and scripting reasons, the last Harry Potter book (Harry Potter and the Deathly Hallows) was divided into two films that were shot back-to-back. This decision drew criticism from the series' fans, but Radcliffe defended the split, stating that it would have been impossible to properly adapt the final novel into a single film. The two-film finale, Harry Potter and the Deathly Hallows – Part 1 and Part 2, was released in November 2010 and July 2011, respectively. While Deathly Hallows – Part 1 grossed $960 million, Deathly Hallows – Part 2 grossed more than $1.3 billion worldwide; as of May 2019, it was the 11th-highest-grossing film of all time. Deathly Hallows – Part 2 was critically acclaimed, as was Radcliffe's performance; Ann Hornaday of The Washington Post asked, "Who could have predicted that Radcliffe, Grint and Watson would turn out to be good actors"? Critic Rex Reed remarked, "Frankly, I'm sorry to see [Radcliffe] go"; Roger Ebert gave the film a highly positive review, but felt that Radcliffe, Grint and Watson were "upstaged by the supporting [actors]".

Radcliffe acknowledged that some people would never be able to separate him from the Harry Potter character; however, he has said he is "proud to be associated with this film series forever". Despite positive feelings about the films, he has no interest in doing more Harry Potter films. After Rowling hinted about writing an eighth book, Radcliffe was asked if he would do another Harry Potter film, to which he replied, "[It is] very doubtful. I think 10 years is a long time to spend with one character". Despite devoting so much time to the series, Radcliffe has asserted that he did not miss out on a childhood like other child actors, remarking, "I've been given a much better perspective on life by doing Potter."

=== West End and Broadway Theatre debut (2002–2008) ===
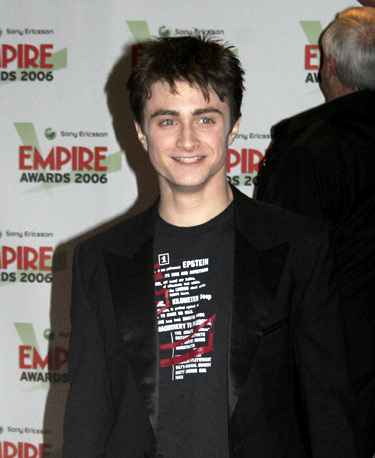
Radcliffe at the 2006 Empire Awards

In 2002, Radcliffe made his stage debut as a celebrity guest in a West End production of The Play What I Wrote, directed by Kenneth Branagh—who also appeared with him in the second Harry Potter film. He appeared in the film December Boys, an Australian family drama about four orphans that was shot in 2005 and released to theaters in mid-September 2007. On 13 April 2006, a portrait of Radcliffe by Stuart Pearson Wright was unveiled as part of a new exhibition opening at the National Theatre, before being moved to the National Portrait Gallery.

In 2007, Radcliffe co-starred with Carey Mulligan in My Boy Jack, a television drama film shown on ITV. The film received mostly positive reviews, with several critics praising Radcliffe's performance as an eighteen-year-old who goes missing in action during a battle. Radcliffe stated, "For many people my age, the First World War is just a topic in a history book. But I've always been fascinated by the subject and think it's as relevant today as it ever was." Later that year, he published several poems under the pen name Jacob Gershon—a combination of his middle name and the Hebrew version of his mother's maiden name Gresham—in the underground fashion magazine Rubbish.

At age seventeen, in a bid to demonstrate that he was prepared for adult roles, Radcliffe starred in a West End revival of Peter Shaffer's play Equus at the Gielgud Theatre. The piece had not been revived since its first run in 1973. Radcliffe took on the lead role of Alan Strang, a stable boy who has an obsession with horses. Advance sales topped £1.7 million. The role generated significant pre-opening media interest, as Radcliffe performed a nude scene. Equus opened on 27 February 2007 and ran until 9 June 2007. Radcliffe's performance was acclaimed, as critics were impressed by the nuance and depth of his against-type role. Charles Spencer of The Telegraph wrote that the actor "displays a dramatic power and an electrifying stage presence that marks a tremendous leap forward." He added: "I never thought I would find the diminutive (but perfectly formed) Radcliffe a sinister figure, but as Alan Strang ... there are moments when he seems genuinely scary in his rage and confusion." The production transferred to Broadway at the Broadhurst Theatre in September 2008. Radcliffe continued in the lead role, starring alongside Kate Mulgrew, Anna Camp, and his Harry Potter co-star Richard Griffiths. Radcliffe was nervous about reprising the role on Broadway as he considered American audiences to be more discerning than those in London. Radcliffe's performance was nominated for a Drama Desk Award.

=== Return to Broadway and independent films (2010–2018) ===
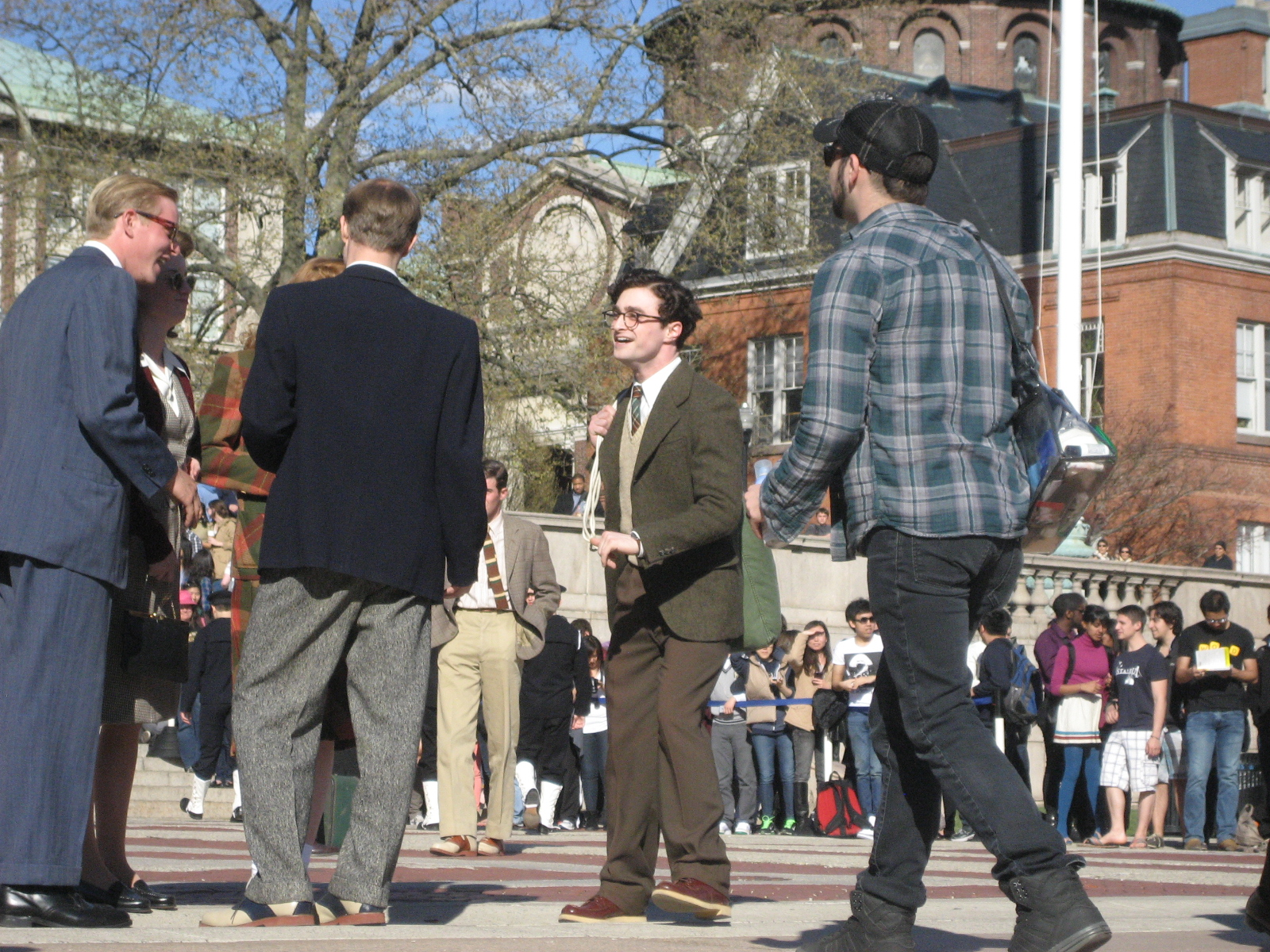
Radcliffe filming Kill Your Darlings on the campus of Columbia University in 2012

After voicing a character in The Simpsons episode "Treehouse of Horror XXI" in late 2010, Radcliffe debuted as J. Pierrepont Finch in a 2011 Broadway revival of How to Succeed in Business Without Really Trying at the Al Hirschfeld Theatre. The role had previously been played by Robert Morse and Matthew Broderick. Other cast members included John Larroquette, Rose Hemingway and Mary Faber. Both the actor and production received favourable reviews, with USA Today commenting: "Radcliffe ultimately succeeds not by overshadowing his fellow cast members, but by working in conscientious harmony with them – and having a blast in the process." Radcliffe's performance in the show earned him Drama Desk Award, Drama League Award and Outer Critics Circle Award nominations. The production itself later received nine Tony Award nominations. Radcliffe left the show on 1 January 2012.

Radcliffe's first post-Harry Potter project was the 2012 horror film The Woman in Black, adapted from the 1983 novel by Susan Hill. The film was released on 3 February 2012 in the United States and Canada, and was released on 10 February in the UK. Radcliffe portrays a man sent to deal with the legal matters of a mysterious woman who has just died, and soon after he begins to experience strange events and hauntings from the ghost of a woman dressed in black. He has said he was "incredibly excited" to be part of the film and described the script as "beautifully written".

In 2013, he portrayed American beat poet Allen Ginsberg in the thriller drama Kill Your Darlings, directed by John Krokidas. He also starred in an Irish-Canadian romantic comedy film The F Word (2013) directed by Michael Dowseand written by Elan Mastai, based on TJ Dawe and Michael Rinaldi's play Toothpaste and Cigars and then he starred in Horns, an American dark fantasy horror film directed by Alexandre Aja. Both of the films premiered at the 38th Toronto International Film Festival. Also in 2013, Radcliffe performed at the Noël Coward Theatre in the stage play revival of Martin McDonagh's dark comedy The Cripple of Inishmaan as the lead, Billy Claven, for which he won the WhatsOnStage Award for Best Actor in a Play.

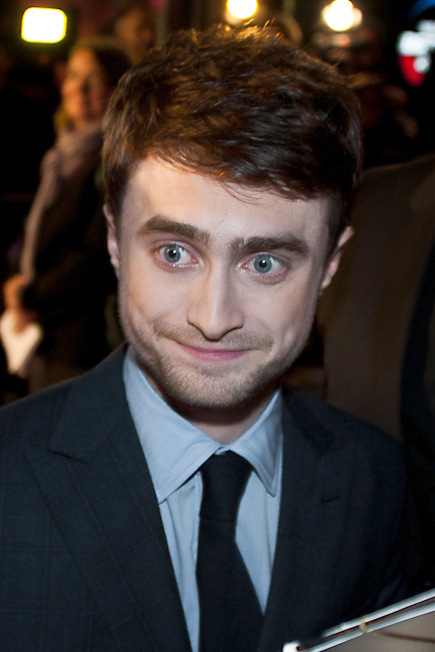
Radcliffe at the screening of Kill Your Darlings in 2013

Radcliffe starred as Igor in a science fiction horror film Victor Frankenstein (2015), directed by Paul McGuigan and written by Max Landis. The film was based on contemporary adaptations of Mary Shelley's 1818 novel Frankenstein. He also starred as Sam Houser, one of the founders of Rockstar Games, in the biographical drama film The Gamechangers. Radcliffe starred in the action adventure film Now You See Me 2 (2016) alongside Mark Ruffalo, Jesse Eisenberg, and Woody Harrelson. playing a technological prodigy, entrepreneur, criminal mastermind and a main leading antagonist all along with Michael Caine's character named Arthur Tressler (of whom Radcliffe's character is revealed to be the son), who whilst in turn resents magic. In 2016, Radcliffe portrayed Manny, a talkative corpse, in the indie film Swiss Army Man with Paul Dano. That same year, he starred in the critically acclaimed independent film Imperium (2016) alongside Toni Collette and Tracy Letts. He played Nate Foster, an idealistic FBI agent who goes undercover to take down a radical white supremacy group. The film received an 84% on Rotten Tomatoes with the consensus reading, "The unsettling Imperium boasts troublingly timely themes and a talented cast led by Daniel Radcliffe as an undercover FBI agent infiltrating a ring of white supremacists."

Radcliffe starred off-Broadway at The Public Theater in a documentary theatre piece titled Privacy, playing the role of The Writer. In 2017, he starred as Yossi Ghinsberg in the thriller Jungle, which was based on an internationally best-selling memoir of the same name by Yossi Ghinsberg. In 2018, Radcliffe portrayed a pilot smuggling drugs across borders in the independent action-thriller Beast of Burden directed by Jesper Ganslandt. The same year, he returned to Broadway in the ninety-minute comedy play The Lifespan of a Fact at Studio 54 Theatre with Bobby Cannavale and Cherry Jones. The play revolves around a determined young fact checker who goes up against his demanding editor and an unorthodox author. As part of his research for the role, Radcliffe spent a day working in the fact checking department of The New Yorker.

=== Career expansion with intermittent work (2019–present) ===
In 2019, Radcliffe starred as Craig in the TBS comedy limited series Miracle Workers based on the book by Simon Rich. The show's second season premiered on 28 January 2020. He voice–starred as Rex Dasher, a secret agent who helps Marla, in the animated film Playmobil: The Movie directed by Lino DiSalvo. In 2020, Radcliffe starred as Miles in the action comedy film Guns Akimbo directed by Jason Lei Howden and co-starring Samara Weaving and Natasha Liu Bordizzo. He also starred as Tim Jenkin in the thriller film Escape from Pretoria, based on the real-life prison escape by three young political prisoners from jail in South Africa in 1979. He also played the role of Prince Frederick in the Netflix special Unbreakable Kimmy Schmidt opposite Ellie Kemper. Radcliffe reunited with multiple cast members of the Harry Potter film series for an HBO Max special titled Harry Potter 20th Anniversary: Return to Hogwarts, which was released on 1 January 2022. Radcliffe stars as the villain, Abigail Fairfax, in the action-adventure comedy film The Lost City, opposite Sandra Bullock and Channing Tatum. He portrayed musician "Weird Al" Yankovic in Weird: The Al Yankovic Story, a biographical parody film produced for The Roku Channel, for which he received his first Primetime Emmy Award nomination.

In early 2022, Radcliffe returned to the stage acting alongside Jonathan Groff and Lindsay Mendez in the New York Theatre Workshop revival of the Stephen Sondheim musical Merrily We Roll Along, in which he played Charley Kringas. The revival started on 21 November 2022 and opened on 12 December 2022, running for a limited engagement through 8 January 2023, before transferring to a critically acclaimed run on Broadway. The production closed on 7 July 2024. For his performance, Radcliffe won the Tony Award for Best Featured Actor in a Musical. A film version of Merrily We Roll Along, starring Radcliffe and his co-stars from their stage production, had been picked up by Sony Pictures Classics. The release date for the U.S. was set for 5 December 2025. Radcliffe returned to Broadway in the interactive one-man play Every Brilliant Thing at the Hudson Theatre in February 2026, earning a second Tony nomination. In March 2026, it was announced that Law & Order: Special Victims Unit star Mariska Hargitay would replace Radcliffe in the play starting May 2026.

Radcliffe is set to star in the war thriller Trust the Man. In May 2025, it was announced that Radcliffe would star in the Tina Fey-produced television series The Fall and Rise of Reggie Dinkins alongside Tracy Morgan and Erika Alexander. The first episode premiered in January 2026. In May 2026, The Fall and Rise of Reggie Dinkins was renewed for a second season.

== Philanthropy ==
Radcliffe has lent his support to various charitable organisations. He designed the Cu-Bed for Habitat's VIP Kids range (a cube made of eight smaller ones which can be made into a bed, chaise-longue or chair) with all the royalties from the sale of the bed going directly to his favourite charity, Demelza House Children's Hospice in Sittingbourne, Kent. Radcliffe has urged fans to make donations to the charity's Candle for Care programme in lieu of giving him Christmas presents. In 2008, he was among several celebrities who donated their old glasses to an exhibit honouring victims of the Holocaust. During the Broadway run of Equus he auctioned off a pair of jeans and other items worn in the show, for New-York-based Broadway Cares/Equity Fights AIDS and was a presenter at the 2011 Gypsy of the Year competition.

He has also made donations in support of Get Connected UK, a London-based free confidential national helpline for troubled youth.

== Other ventures ==
=== Political and social views ===
Radcliffe is a supporter of the Labour Party. He previously supported the Liberal Democrats, and endorsed then-Lib Dem leader Nick Clegg in the 2010 general election. In 2012, however, he switched his political alignment to Labour, citing disillusionment with the performance of Clegg and the Liberal Democrats while in government, and approving of then-Labour leader Ed Miliband. In 2015, he endorsed Jeremy Corbyn's Labour Party leadership campaign. He told The Big Issue, "I feel like this show of sincerity by a man who has been around long enough and stuck to his beliefs long enough that he knows them and doesn't have to be scripted is what is making people sit up and get excited. It is great."

In 2009, Radcliffe stated that although he considers himself a "fierce patriot" he supports abolishing the British monarchy and replacing it with a republic, adding that the monarchy "symbolized a lot of what is wrong with the country".

He supports British unionism, and opposed the 2014 Scottish independence referendum because he "personally like[s] the UK being how it is".

Radcliffe is supportive of the LGBTQ community. Speaking out against homophobia, he began filming public service announcements in 2009 for The Trevor Project, promoting awareness of gay teen suicide prevention. He first learned of the organization while performing Equus on Broadway in 2008 and has contributed financially to it. He said in a 2010 interview, "I have always hated anybody who is not tolerant of gay men or lesbians or bisexuals. Now I am in the very fortunate position where I can actually help or do something about it." In the same interview, he stressed the importance of public figures advocating for equal rights. He received The Trevor Project's Hero Award in 2011 for his contributions.

In June 2020, amid controversy over Harry Potter author J. K. Rowling's remarks on transgender people, Radcliffe penned an essay published by The Trevor Project in which he voiced support for the transgender community and expressed regret that Rowling's statements tarnished some fans' experience of the Harry Potter books.

== Personal life ==
=== Relationships and family ===
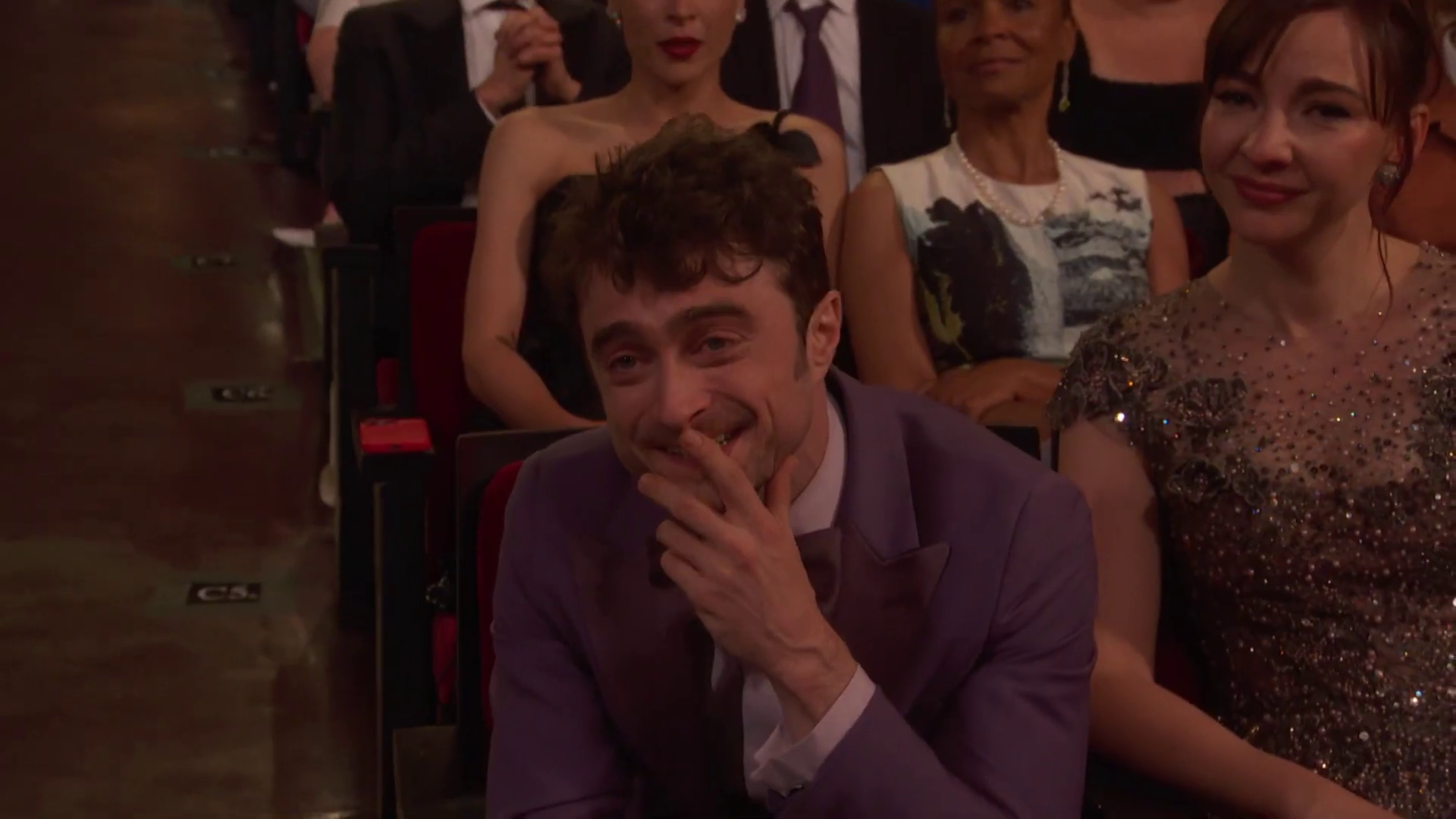
Radcliffe with partner Erin Darke at the 77th Tony Awards

Radcliffe splits his time between homes in the Fulham area of London and the West Village neighbourhood of New York City's Manhattan borough. He has been in a relationship with American actress Erin Darke since 2012, after having met on the set of Kill Your Darlings. They have a son, who was born in April 2023. Radcliffe called fatherhood "the literal best thing that ever happened" to him.

Radcliffe is close with his family, whom he credits for keeping him grounded. In 2024, he had said that his parents, who had been married for 30 years, had inspired him in his relationship with Darke. In August 2010, he became teetotal after finding himself becoming too reliant on alcohol, particularly during the filming of Half-Blood Prince. In March 2020, he appeared as the guest on BBC Radio 4's Desert Island Discs, during which he discussed his alcohol misuse during his teens, his decision to become teetotal, and how his parents' support and staying in his native England helped him cope with fame.

=== Health ===
In 2008, Radcliffe revealed that he has a mild form of the neurological disorder dyspraxia, which sometimes prevents him from doing simple activities such as writing or tying his shoelaces. He said, "I was having a hard time at school, in terms of being crap at everything, with no discernible talent." While on the set of the 2013 film Horns, Radcliffe accidentally drank antifreeze, which caused him to become "horrendously ill" for "a disgusting, feverish three days".

In early 2026 he discussed having given up smoking after having smoked "pretty heavily" for 20 years.

=== Religious beliefs ===
Radcliffe stated of his beliefs in 2012: "There was never [religious] faith in the house. I think of myself as being Jewish and Irish, despite the fact that I'm English." He has said that his family are "Christmas tree Jews" and he said "I'm an atheist, but I'm very proud of being Jewish. It means I have a good work ethic, and you get Jewish humour and you're allowed to tell Jewish jokes." In 2009, he stated that he was an atheist and said, "I'm very relaxed about [being an atheist]. I don't preach my atheism, but I have a huge amount of respect for people like Richard Dawkins who do. Anything he does on television, I will watch." He said in 2012, "I'm an atheist, and a militant atheist when religion starts impacting on legislation." In 2019, he described himself as "agnostic leaning toward atheism".

== Artistry and media image ==
Radcliffe has shown a willingness to take on strange, risky, and unconventional indie projects (Swiss Army Man, Weird: The Al Yankovic Story) rather than chasing safe commercial blockbusters. He appeared on the Sunday Times Rich List in 2006, which estimated his personal fortune to be £14 million, making him one of the richest young people in the UK. He was featured in Forbes Celebrity 100 list in 2007 and in 2010. In March 2009, he was ranked at number one on the Forbes "Most Valuable Young Stars" list, and by April The Daily Telegraph measured his net worth at £30 million, making him the 12th richest young person in the UK. Radcliffe was reported to have earned £1 million for the first Harry Potter film, around £15 million for the sixth, and around £39 million for the final two movies combined. In all, he is estimated to have made a total of £75.4 million from the entire franchise.

He was considered to be the richest teenager in England later that year. In February 2010, he was named the sixth highest-paid Hollywood male star and placed at number five on Forbes's December list of Hollywood's highest-grossing actors (Note: This refers to the amount of money taken by films in which they have appeared, not their personal income.) with a film revenue of US$780 million, mainly due to Harry Potter and the Deathly Hallows being released that year. As of 2021, Radcliffe's net worth is estimated at £95 million.

== Acting credits and accolades ==
Radcliffe is known for his starring roles portraying the title role in the Harry Potter film series (2001–2011), poet Allen Ginsberg in the biographical drama Kill Your Darlings (2013) and musical satirist "Weird Al" Yankovic in the biopic parody Weird: The Al Yankovic Story (2022), the later of which earned him a nomination for the Primetime Emmy Award for Outstanding Lead Actor in a Limited or Anthology Series or Movie. He has also acted in numerous other films from a wide variety of genres such as the horror films The Woman in Black (2012), Horns (2013) and Victor Frankenstein (2015), the surrealist comedy Swiss Army Man (2015), the romantic comedy The F Word (2013), the crime thriller Imperium (2016), and the adventure comedy The Lost City (2022).

He has also established himself as a stage actor, making his Broadway debut in a revival of the Peter Shaffer play Equus (2007). He returned to Broadway in the musical revival of How to Succeed in Business Without Really Trying (2011), earning a nomination for the Grammy Award for Best Musical Theater Album, the Martin McDonagh play The Cripple of Inishmaan (2014), and Stephen Sondheim's musical Merrily We Roll Along (2023), the latter of which earned him a Tony Award for Best Featured Actor in a Musical and another Grammy Award nomination.
