= Rubbish (magazine) =

British fashion magazine

RUBBISH
- Cover of Volume 1
- Publisher: Rubbish Ltd.
- First issue: February 2006
- Country: United Kingdom
- Website: rubbishmag.com
- OCLC: 494580175

RUBBISH magazine is a limited edition hardback fashion magazine that aims to take a more lighthearted and sometimes satirical look at the world of fashion, which is not generally explored by other fashion magazines. The magazine, created by ex-Teen Vogue European editor Jenny Dyson, was launched during London Fashion Week in February 2006.

Dyson came up with the idea for the magazine whilst heavily pregnant with her second child.

== Editions ==
- RUBBISH 1 – The first ever edition featuring Giles Deacon and Erin O’Connor. Launched during fashion week in February 2006.
- RUBBISH 2 – Launched at the British Fashion Awards in November 2007, featuring Thandie Newton.
- RUBBISH 2.5 – Limited edition, only 1000 copies, collaborating with Henry Holland, Holly Fulton, Anthony Zinonos and Kyle Bean.

In 2011 RUBBISH 2.5 won a D&AD Award in the category Magazine and Newspaper Design, securing a place in the D&AD 2011 Annual.

== The London Fashion Week Daily ==
LFW's Daily Rubbish a free eight page broadsheet launched in September 2007, as a joint venture with the British Fashion Council. Five thousand copies were distributed daily during London Fashion Week. providing news, gossip, interviews, fashion profiles, behind-the-scene glimpses, cartoons and quizzes. In 2008 LFW's Daily Rubbish was renamed The Daily and continued to be published live at London Fashion Week. Writers include Rebecca Lowthorpe (Elle), Sarah Bailey (Harper’s Bazaar), Anna-Marie Solowij (Vogue), Sarah Mower (Style.com), Lauren Cochrane (The Guardian), Melanie Rickey (Grazia), fashion commentator and broadcaster Caryn Franklin, and Orange Prize-winning novelist Linda Grant.

== Rubbish & Pencil ==
In 2011, William Sieghart and Neil Mendoza bought a stake in RUBBISH magazine. Together Sieghart, Mendoza and Dyson formed creative branding agency Pencil Agency Ltd. Dyson the CEO of RUBBISH became the group creative director of the Pencil Agency Ltd, marking Sieghart and Mendoza’s official return to the world of marketing since they sold Forward Publishing to WPP.

== Rubbish finger puppets ==
In 2009 RUBBISH magazine launched limited edition fashionable finger puppets. The puppets include fashion designers such as Jean Paul Gautier and politicians such as Nick Clegg. In 2011 RUBBISH launched a new range of finger puppets to celebrate significant contributors to fashion of the 21st century. This included Isabella Bow, Karl Lagerfeld, Viktor & Rolf, plus Lady Gaga.
