= Privacy (play) =

2014 play by James Graham

- Original language: English
- Written by: James Graham
- Genre: Drama

Premiere
- Date: 10 April 2014
- Place: Donmar Warehouse

Privacy is a 2014 play by James Graham. The play looks at how the personal information we share is used by the government and other corporations, and how this affects our security. It was inspired by revelations by Edward Snowden regarding government surveillance.

== Productions ==
Privacy had its world premiere production at the Donmar Warehouse, London with an official opening night on 22 April 2014, following previews from 10 April. Its limited run concluded on 31 May 2014. Directed by Josie Rourke, the cast consisted of Paul Chahidi, Gunnar Cauthery, Jonathan Coy, Joshua McGuire, Nina Sosanya and Michelle Terry.

The play had its New York premiere in 2016 at the Public Theatre, running from 18 July to 7 August. The production was again directed by Josie Rourke.The cast consisted of De'Adre Aziza, Raffi Barsoumian, Michael Countryman, Rachel Dratch, Daniel Radcliffe and Reg Rogers

It was adapted and directed by Ajay Khatri in India for NSD diploma production, the BRM festival and the ITFOK festival.

== Critical reception ==
The play received mixed reviews. In his 3 star review for The Guardian, Michael Billington stated that "for all its urgent topicality, I felt the play short-circuited the crucial debate about how we guarantee a measure of privacy in the digital age". In his 4 star review for The Daily Telegraph, Charles Spencer described the play as being "entertaining" despite addressing some "serious and urgent themes".

In his review of the New York production for The New York Times, Ben Brantley said that the play "doesn’t provide much material that hasn’t been rehashed many times in newspaper and magazine (and blog and vlog) essays. It can feel rather like one of those middle school instructional films that use a likable animated creature (a talking dinosaur or skeleton, maybe) to keep its distractible young viewers hooked."
