= Jungle (2017 film) =

2017 Australian film by Greg McLean

- Theatrical release poster
- Directed by: Greg McLean
- Screenplay by: Justin Monjo
- Based on: Jungle by Yossi Ghinsberg
- Produced by: Todd Fellman; Mike Gabrawy; Gary Hamilton; Mark Lazarus; Dana Lustig; Greg McLean
- Starring: Daniel Radcliffe; Alex Russell; Thomas Kretschmann; Joel Jackson; Yasmin Kassim; Jacek Koman
- Cinematography: Stefan Duscio
- Edited by: Sean Lahiff
- Music by: Johnny Klimek
- Production companies: Babber Films; Cutting Edge Group; Screen Australia; Screen Queensland
- Distributed by: Umbrella Entertainment (Australia); Cinecolor Films (Colombia)
- Release dates: 3 August 2017 (MIFF); 9 November 2017 (Australia); 31 May 2018 (Colombia)
- Running time: 115 minutes
- Countries: Australia; Colombia
- Language: English
- Box office: $1.9 million

Jungle is a 2017 Australian-Colombian biographical survival drama film, based on the true story of Israeli adventurer Yossi Ghinsberg's 1981 journey into the Amazon rainforest. Directed by Greg McLean and written by Justin Monjo, the film stars Daniel Radcliffe as Ghinsberg, with Alex Russell, Thomas Kretschmann, Joel Jackson, Yasmin Kassim, and Jacek Koman in supporting roles.

It was filmed in Mount Tamborine on the Gold Coast in Queensland, Australia.

== Plot ==
In the early 1980s, an Israeli adventurer named Yossi Ghinsberg travels to Bolivia planning to journey into the heart of the Amazon rainforest. There, he meets Marcus Stamm, a Swiss school teacher, and Marcus's friend Kevin Gale, an American hiker and avid photographer. The three are staying in La Paz, at an Israeli community hostel. Yossi is out in the market one day where an Austrian stranger asks if he is an American; Yossi replies ”no”.

During conversation the stranger, Karl Ruprechter, claims the existence of an indigenous tribe in the jungle that they should go see. Karl says he knows the jungle, and he is friends with the tribe.

Yossi, excited about the prospect of exploring the uncharted jungle and meeting an indigenous tribe deep in the Amazon, believes him. He heads back to the apartment to convince Marcus and Kevin to come along. Skeptical of the stranger and his story, they refuse. Yossi continues to press them until they ultimately acquiesce.

The next day, the trio meets Karl in a shop while he is gathering supplies for the journey. All three men are surprised when Karl leaves with the supplies and tells them they will pay for everything.

Yossi, Marcus, Kevin, and Karl hike through the jungle for several days. They make it to a village called Asriamas where it is apparent Karl knows the villagers. They spend the day in the village and stay overnight, then head back into the jungle the next morning.

Marcus starts having trouble walking and discovers his feet are full of bloody sores. By now Kevin and Yossi are tired of Marcus's complaining.

Yossi, Kevin, and Karl discuss how they all should proceed. Karl wants to leave the three while he goes to get help, but Kevin and Yossi disagree with that plan. At this point Marcus walks up, and Kevin proposes building a raft to navigate downriver so all of them can stay together. (This differs from Ghinsberg's actual account, where the four return all the way to Asriamas before deciding to make the raft with the help of the villagers.)

They build the raft and set off down the river. They hit some rapids, barely making it through. Karl gets upset at Kevin for taking control on the raft, floats the raft to shore, and says he is going hunting. Kevin had noticed Karl's fear of water and deduces that Karl cannot swim. Yossi then goes to find Karl, so he will not abandon them.

Marcus and Karl decide to abandon the journey and make the three-day hike back to civilization where they can then return to La Paz. Meanwhile, Yossi and Kevin continue their journey downriver until their makeshift raft is hung up on a rock in the middle of the rapids. Kevin decides to swim for shore and instructs Yossi to throw him the machete so he can cut vines and pull him to safety, but the raft is instead destroyed in the rapids.

Yossi is washed away by the river, leaving Kevin behind. Without a knife, tools, or any kind of survival training, Yossi must improvise shelter and forage to survive. He begins to give up hope after losing all sense of direction, wondering if he will survive the jungle. He is alone for at least two weeks, during which time he has several hallucinations regarding his past and finding a local woman.

Meanwhile, Kevin is rescued by people from a nearby town who take him to Rurrenabaque, 120 miles (190 km) from Yossi's location, Curiplaya. At Rurrenabaque, Kevin calls for the help of the local authorities to find Yossi. They fail to find Yossi via a plane flyover, but Kevin believes that Yossi is alive. Kevin ropes in the help of the local boat pilot to search for Yossi, finally discovers his weakened friend, and takes him to Rurrenabaque.

The epilogue reveals that Karl lied about the hidden tribe, was known to lure backpackers into dangerous treks and was wanted by the authorities, believed to be a criminal posing as a guide. Marcus and Karl never returned to La Paz and were never seen again. The film was dedicated to Marcus's memory.

== Cast ==
- Daniel Radcliffe as Yossi Ghinsberg
- Alex Russell as Kevin Gale
- Thomas Kretschmann as Karl Ruprechter
- Joel Jackson as Marcus Stamm
- Yasmin Kassim as Kina
- Jacek Koman as Moni Ghinsberg
- Lily Sullivan as Amie
- Angie Milliken as Stela Ghinsberg
- Joey Vieira as Black Jack
- Paris Moletti as Bolivian
- Luis Jose Lopez as Tico

== Production ==
On 10 February 2016, Daniel Radcliffe joined the cast. On 21 March 2016, Thomas Kretschmann and Alex Russell also joined the cast. Principal photography began on 19 March 2016 and ended on 13 April 2016.

== Release ==
The film premiered at the Melbourne International Film Festival on 3 August 2017. It was released in Australia on 9 November 2017, by Umbrella Entertainment.

=== Reception ===
The review aggregator website Rotten Tomatoes gives the film a rating of 62%, based on 55 reviews, with an average rating of 5.8/10. The website's critics consensus reads: "Daniel Radcliffe does right by Jungle's fact-based story with a clearly committed performance, even if the film around him doesn't always match his efforts." On Metacritic, the film has a score of 48 out of 100, based on 14 critics, indicating "mixed or average reviews".

Writing for The A.V. Club, Alex McLevy gave the film a B−, praising Radcliffe's acting commitment and the shock of some of the scenes but wrote, "Unfortunately, the movie too often can’t resist leaning into the melodrama of the situation. Rather than allowing the power to come from the raw intensity of what transpired, it occasionally turns Ghinsberg’s journey into a Hollywood spectacle, making the incredible seem a little less so in the process." Dread Central's Jonathan Barkan gave the film 4.5 out of 5, saying that it was, "without a doubt, the most thrilling, exhilarating, and inspiring film I've seen this year."

=== Accolades ===
Stefan Duscio was nominated for Best Cinematography at the 7th AACTA Awards.
