= Every Brilliant Thing =

2013 play by Duncan Macmillan

- Original language: English
- Written by: Duncan Macmillan with Jonny Donahoe
- Based on: Sleeve Notes by Duncan Macmillan
- Characters: Narrator
- Subject: Mental health, depression, suicide, joy
- Genre: Solo performance

Premiere
- Date: June 2013
- Place: Ludlow Fringe Festival

Every Brilliant Thing is a play written by Duncan Macmillan with Jonny Donahoe. The play features a single performer, working in collaboration with the audience, whose character over the course of many years creates a list of things worth living for as a response to low points in their life.

== Synopsis ==
Every Brilliant Thing opens with the unnamed "Narrator" at age seven who, when their mother attempts suicide, begins a list of things worth living for. As the play proceeds, the list lengthens, through Narrator's college years, marriage, and a bout of depression.

Before each performance, the actor playing Narrator casts audience members. Daniel Radcliffe, who performed the play's Broadway premiere (2026), described two levels of audience engagement. During the first, "a light lift", some audience members are handed a card with a number and text. When Narrator calls out a number, the member with that card shouts the name of the corresponding list entry—for example, rollercoasters, Super Mario, or people falling over. The second level, "the heavy lifts," involves five people playing "very significant roles...They are people that do not know that they will be doing that when they come into the theater that night. And I have to try and suss out who I would like to use and then if they would like to be used. Generally speaking, people are fairly amenable to it, but we do get some absolute hard nos from people sometimes." Radcliffe would tell participants that they do not have to be funny or clever, though those would be a bonus. The only thing they should do is be kind. "And if you're kind, the show flies."

A key audience role is Mrs. Patterson, a school guidance counselor. The woman playing her removes her sock to use as a sock puppet as a way of communicating with the young Narrator, then returns at the end to soothe the now despondent adult. These character roles, played ad lib, unfold differently at each performance.

== History ==
Every Brilliant Thing began as a 15-20 minute monologue entitled Sleeve Notes that Macmillan wrote for his friend, the actress Rosie Thomson, who first performed it in 2006. Macmillan caught the attention of director George Perrin after the playwright himself performed the monologue at an event sponsored by the theater company Paines Plough. The pair created an actual list of things worth living for, then solicited more items from a Facebook group, with further items contributed by members of the audience. As the monologue continued to be performed live, audience members were invited to write down and contribute list ideas. A subsequent art exhibit at Latitude Festival 2009 featured some of the list items along with a succession of performers doing the monologue continuously over four days.

In 2012, Macmillan and Perrin worked with Jonny Donahoe to expand the monologue into what would become a 70 minute play. Donahoe's experience as a performer who involves the audience would prove pivotal. Donahoe debuted Every Brilliant Thing at Ludlow Fringe Festival on 28 June 2013, taking it to the 2014 Edinburgh Festival Fringe, a four-month off-Broadway run at the Barrow Street Theatre, and its London debut at the Orange Tree Theater. HBO Documentary Films combined three 2015 performances in making the play available to its audience.

As of 2024, Every Brilliant Thing had been produced professionally about 400 times in 63 countries, including Kenya, Korea, Singapore, Germany, Bangladesh, and Japan. In The Guardian, critic Natasha Tripney wrote that the play has the chameleon-like quality of adapting to different cultural contexts. A Greek version, for example, included references to 1990s Greek popular culture, including actress Melina Theo singing the 1980s song Serenata. She recalled that every night, "the audience would join in."

Many performances include access to mental health support following the show, in partnership with local organizations. Audience members have revealed that attending the play caused them to reevaluate a planned suicide, begin therapy, or become a counselor. Actors Candunn Jennette and Greg Dragas have performed it on the USS George H.W. Bush aircraft carrier, sometimes following a spike in suicides; Dragas called these Navy shows "some of the most important that we do."

Radcliffe performed in the lead role on Broadway from 21 February through 24 May 2026 at the Hudson Theatre. In their Broadway debuts, Mariska Hargitay succeeded Radcliffe on 26 May 2026 and Tracee Ellis Ross succeeded Hargitay on 7 July. The final performance was 9 August after 22 previews and 169 regular performances.

On 19 May 2026, the producers of the Broadway production announced that a national tour would begin in the fall of 2027, starting from Seattle, Washington.

== Awards and nominations ==
Year	Award	Category	Nominee	Result	Ref.
2026	Tony Awards	Best Revival of a Play		Nominated	
2026	Tony Awards	Best Performance by an Actor in a Leading Role in a Play	Daniel Radcliffe	Nominated	
2026	Outer Critics Circle Awards	Oustanding Solo Performance	Daniel Radcliffe	Won	
