= Pegi Vail =

American anthropologist

- Born: Margaret Vail
- Occupations: Anthropologist, professor, documentary filmmaker, travel & cultural consultant

Pegi Vail (also known as Margaret Vail) is an American anthropologist, documentary filmmaker, and curator at New York University.

== Career ==
A former Fulbright Scholar, Vail began as a visual artist and museum educator. Receiving her Ph.D. at NYU in Sociocultural Anthropology in 2004, Vail's dissertation focused on the "backpacker subculture," travel narratives and the 'gentrification' of the Bolivian tourism industry, a topic she would return to in her award-winning feature-length documentary film, Gringo Trails. Upon its release, Gringo Trails was featured in a number of international publications, including The Hollywood Reporter, Condé Nast, Der Spiegel, and Globo. Vail also appeared on interview with CNN International, RadioLIVE New Zealand and RTÉ 2fm, in conjunction with the film's release.

Vail began her academic career as an adjunct professor in Columbia University's Anthropology Department from 2007 to 2011. Since 2011, Vail has acted as an associate director at NYU's Center for Media, Culture and History, and teaches ethnographic documentary production in the Program in Culture & Media. She has appeared as a featured speaker at numerous universities, travel study tours, tourism conferences, and museums, such as the Museum of Modern Art, and the American Museum of Natural History.

Vail has been a featured as an influencer in travel and tourism by The New York Times, The Wall Street Journal, and internationally in Spain's La Vanguardia.

Along with her academic and filmmaking career, Vail has worked as a travel and cultural consultant, acting as the main anthropology consultant and APP co-writer for the Nomads virtual reality documentary, developed by Canadian-based digital artists, Félix & Paul Studios and the Samsung Gear VR. Vail is also a founding member, curator, and featured storyteller of the popular not-for-profit storytelling collective, The Moth, and serves as a judge for the National Geographic World Legacy Awards.

== Personal life ==
Vail lives in Brooklyn with her husband, Melvin Estrella.
