= Puquina languages =

Language family of South America

- Geographic distribution: Around Lake Titicaca
- Extinct: early 19th century L2: 10-20 (2007, Kallawaya)
- Linguistic classification: usually unclassified Macro-Arawakan?
- Subdivisions: Puquina †; Kallawaya (mixed); ?Leco; ?Qhapaq simi †

Language codes
- ISO 639-3: puq (Puquina proper only)
- Glottolog: puqu1242 Puquina proper only

Puquina (or Pukina) is a small, putative language family, often portrayed as a language isolate, which consists of the extinct Puquina language and Kallawaya. It is generally assumed that the latter is a remnant of the former mixed with Quechua. Puquina speakers are last mentioned in the early nineteenth century.

The Qhapaq simi, which was spoken by the Inca elite, in contrast to the Quechuan-speaking commoners, is thought to be related, as well as the Leco language, generally considered a language isolate. They are spoken by several native ethnic groups in the region surrounding Lake Titicaca (Peru and Bolivia) and in the north of Chile. Puquina itself is often associated with the culture that built Tiwanaku.

== History ==
In spite of the fact that Puquina was originally a lingua franca of the region during colonization, it rapidly declined and then went extinct. Its decline began before the Spanish conquest as Aymaran speaking peoples divided the population of Puquina into several small groups.

Remnants of the single, ancestral Puquina language can be found in the Quechuan and Spanish languages spoken in the south of Peru, mainly in Arequipa, Moquegua and Tacna, as well as in Bolivia. There also seem to be remnants in the Kallawaya language, which may be a mixed language formed from Quechuan languages and Puquina. (Terrence Kaufman (1990) finds the proposal plausible.)

Some theories claim that Qhapaq Simi, the cryptic language of the nobility of the Inca Empire, was closely related to Puquina, and that Runa Simi (Quechuan languages) were spoken by commoners. The Leco language might also be related.

There may have been more Puquina languages, like Chumbivilca, which is known only from toponyms.

Moulian et al. (2015) argue that Puquina language influenced the Mapuche language of southern Chile long before the rise of the Inca Empire. This areal linguistic influence may have started with a migratory wave arising from the collapse of the Tiwanaku Empire around 1000 CE.

Sometimes the term Puquina is used for the Uru language, which is distinctly different.

== Classification ==
Puquina has been considered an unclassified language family, since it has not been proven to be firmly related to any other languages in the Andean region. A relationship with the Arawakan languages has long been suggested, based solely on the possessive paradigm (1st no-, 2nd pi-, 3rd ču-), which is similar to the Proto-Arawakan subject forms (1st *nu-, 2nd *pi-, 3rd *tʰu-). Jolkesky (2016: 310–317) has presented further possible lexical cognates between Puquina and the Arawakan languages, proposing that this language family belongs to the putative Macro-Arawakan stock along with the Candoshi and the Munichi languages. However, such a hypothesis still lacks conclusive scientific evidence.

In this regard, Adelaar and van de Kerke (2009: 126) have pointed out that if in fact the Puquina languages are, genetically, related to the Arawakan languages, its separation from this family must have occurred at a relatively early date; the authors further suggest that in such a case the location of the Puquina speakers should be taken into account in the debate over the geographic origin of the Arawakan family. Such consideration was taken up by Jolkesky (op. cit., 611–616) in his archaeo-ecolinguistic model of diversification of the Macro-Arawakan languages. According to this author, the proto-Macro-Arawakan language would have been spoken in the Middle Ucayali River Basin during the beginning of the 2nd millennium BCE and its speakers would have produced the Tutishcainyo pottery found in this region.

Jolkesky (2016) classifies Puquina as a Macro-Arawakan language.

== Language contact ==
Jolkesky (2016) notes that there are lexical similarities with the Aymaran, Cahuapanan, Quechuan, Panoan, Tananan and Uru-Chipaya language families due to contact.

From a list of 200 basic words, 70 percent were not borrowed, 14 percent were from Aymara, 2 percent were from the Uru-Chipaya family, and the remaining 14 percent were unspecified.

== Vocabulary ==
Numerals in Puquina and other nearby languages:

Numeral	Puquina	Kallawaya	Uru	Quechua	Aymara
1	pesq	uksi	shi	huk ~ shuk	maya
2	so	soo	pisqe	iskay	paya
3	qapa	qapi	chcp	kimsa	kimsa
4	sper	pili	pakpik	tawa	pusi
5	taqpa	chisma	paanuqo	pisqa	pisqa
6	chichun	tajwa	pachuy	suqta	sojta (qallqo)
7	stu	kajsi	tohonqo	qanchis	pa qallqo
8	kina	wasa	qonqo	pusaq	kimsa qallqo
9	cheqa	nuki	sanqaw	isqun	lla-tunqa
10	sqara	jocha	qalo	chunka	tunqa

Pronouns in Puquina and other nearby languages:

English	Puquina	Kallawaya	Uru	Quechua	Aymara
I	ni	nisi	wiril	ñuqa	naya
you (sg.)	pi	chuu	amp	qam	juma
he	chu, hi	chuinin	tis, nis	pay	jupa
we (inclusive)	nich	nisiyku	uchumi	ñuqayku	jiwasa
we (exclusive)	señ	nisinchej	wisnaqa	ñuqanchik	nanaka
you (pl.)	pich	chuukunas	ampchuqa	qamkuna	jumanaka
they	chuch	chuininkuna	nisnaqa	paykuna	jupanaka

== Bibliography ==
- Adelaar, Willem and van de Kerke, Simon (2009). "Puquina." In: Mily Crevels and Pieter Muysken (eds.) Lenguas de Bolivia, vol. I, 125-146. La Paz: Plural editores. (in Spanish)
- Aguiló, F. (1991). Diccionario kallawaya. La Paz: MUSEF
- Girault, L. (1989). Kallawaya: el idioma secreto de los incas. Diccionario. Bolivia: UNICEF/OPS/OMS.
- La Grasserie, R. de. (1894). Langues Américaines: langue Puquina; textes Puquina. Leipzig: Köhler.
- Jolkesky, Marcelo (2016). Estudo arqueo-ecolinguístico das terras tropicais sul-americanas. Brasilia: UnB. PhD Dissertation. Available here.
