= Lidia Patty =

Bolivian politician (born 1969)

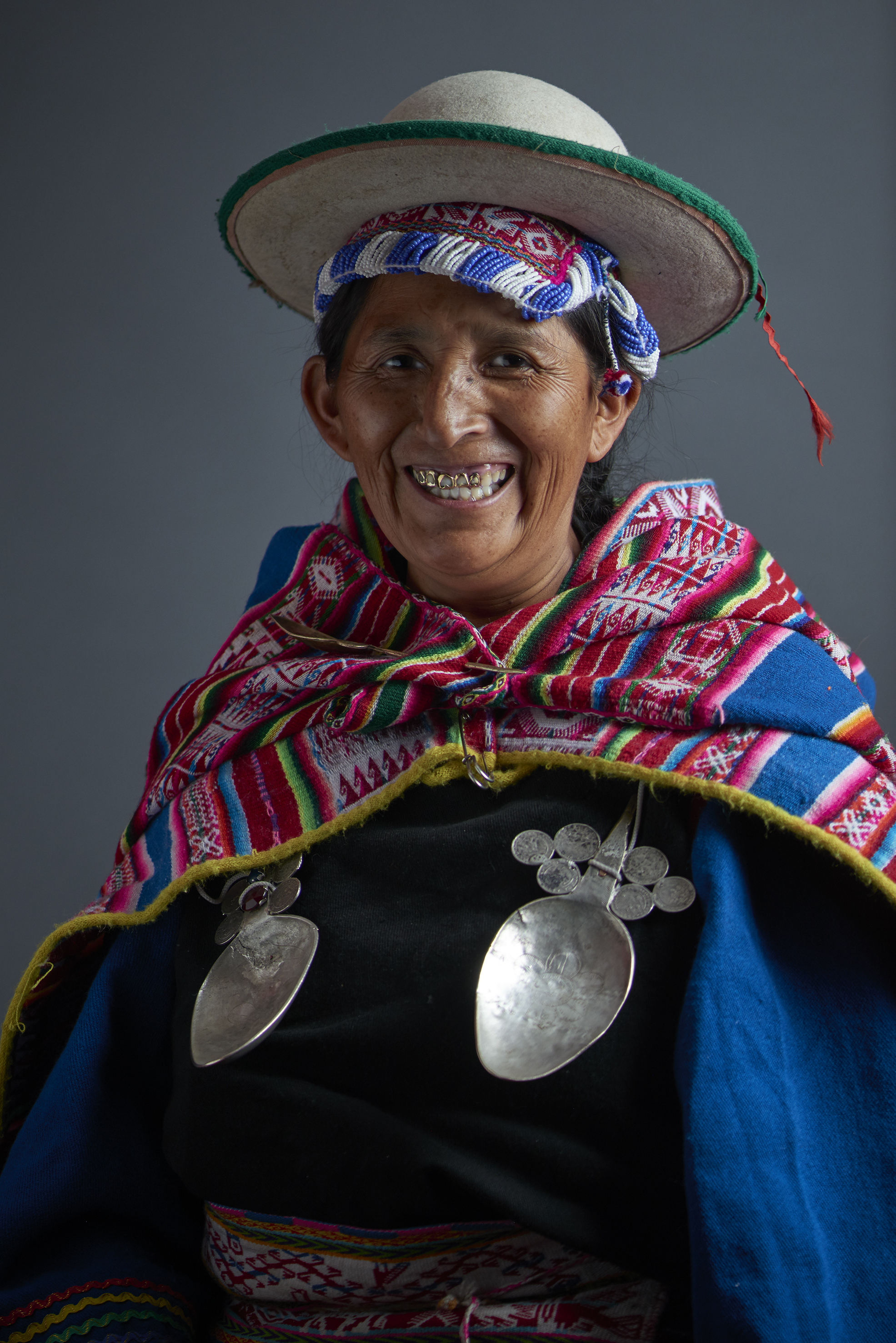
- Official portrait, 2016

Consul of Bolivia to Puno
- In office 1 June 2023 – 13 June 2023
- President: Luis Arce
- Preceded by: Felipa Huanca
- Succeeded by: TBD

Member of the Chamber of Deputies from La Paz
- In office 1 February 2018 – 3 November 2020
- Preceded by: Manuel Canelas
- Succeeded by: Freddy López
- Constituency: Party list

Member of the Chamber of Deputies from La Paz
- Substitute
- In office 23 January 2015 – 1 February 2018
- Deputy: Manuel Canelas
- Preceded by: María Alanoca
- Succeeded by: Virginia Alanoca
- Constituency: Party list

Personal details
- Born: Lidia Patty Mullisaca; 7 June 1969 (age 57) Charazani, La Paz, Bolivia
- Party: Movement for Socialism
- Occupation: Politician; trade unionist

Lidia Patty Mullisaca (born 7 June 1969) is a Bolivian politician and trade unionist. A member of the Movement for Socialism, Patty represented La Paz in the Chamber of Deputies, first as a substitute alongside Manuel Canelas from 2015 to 2018 and later as a voting member until 2020. She later served as consul of Bolivia to Puno, Peru, in June 2023 and has been vice consul of Bolivia in La Plata, Argentina, since September 2023.

An ethnic Kallawaya from Charazani in the Bautista Saavedra Province, Patty worked in domestic service before being employed as a rural schoolteacher. Starting from the mid-1990s, she became active in political activism and joined the Bartolina Sisa Confederation, serving as the organization's provincial executive and later departmental secretary. Around this time, she joined the nascent Movement for Socialism, with which she entered electoral politics in 1999. She won her first race for a seat on the Charazani Municipal Council in 2004 and was elected to the Chamber of Deputies in 2014.

Having kept a low profile while in office, Patty gained national notoriety following the conclusion of her term. She was the principal complainant in the Coup d'état Case, which resulted in the criminal prosecution of former president Jeanine Áñez and many other military and political actors in the country's 2019 crisis. A polemic figure for her frequent denunciations of both opposition and some ruling party officials alike, Patty launched an unsuccessful bid to become ombudsman of Bolivia in 2022.

After briefly being considered for the post of ambassador to Paraguay, Patty was designated consul to Puno, Peru, in 2023. Amid deteriorating relations between both countries, the Peruvian government requested the annulment of her appointment, and the Bolivian Foreign Ministry withdrew her from the country shortly thereafter.

== Early life and political career ==
=== Early life and education ===
Lidia Patty was born on 7 June 1969 in the Charazani Municipality, capital district of La Paz's Bautista Saavedra Province. The region, situated in the Bolivian Yungas, is home to the Kallawaya, an indigenous ethnic group of which Patty is part. As with many Kallawaya, Patty is a practitioner of traditional medicine, a product of her people's historic dedication to folk healing.

Patty completed portions of her primary schooling in Charazani before moving to La Paz at age 19. She spent some time employed in domestic service before receiving the support of a social aid institute to return home and complete her education. After a few years of study, during which time she was also taught to read and write Quechua, Patty graduated with a pre-university trade degree. She applied that knowledge to education as a schoolteacher in the employment of SEDEGES, a local government agency.

=== Career and trade unionism ===
In 1994, Patty joined the Bartolina Sisa Confederation, the national indigenous peasant women's union, serving as its provincial executive until 1999. Around this time, she also began making inroads into politics. Although originally a partisan of the Revolutionary Left Movement (MIR), Patty quickly grew disenfranchised with the party and resigned from its ranks within a few weeks or months of registering. "I did not agree with their ideology," she explained, "the MIR used us indigenous people; I did not want to be used." Instead, Patty turned to a less established front: the nascent Movement for Socialism (MAS-IPSP). According to one indigenous authority from the Saavedra Province, once the MAS established a presence in Charazani, Patty became a member "overnight".

In 1999, with the campaign underway for that year's municipal elections, Patty was nominated to seek a seat on the Charazani Municipal Council. She topped the MAS's electoral list in the district but failed to attain the position. Undeterred, she again contested the race in 2004 and was elected as a substitute councillor. Throughout her tenure, Patty stood out as a polemic figure, even netting herself a year-long suspension for "bad behavior" at one point, although she alleges that it was really retribution for her denunciations of economic mismanagement. Patty later challenged the suspension in court and won, forcing the municipality to pay her financial compensation.

== Chamber of Deputies ==
=== Election ===
Following the conclusion of her term on the municipal council, Patty remained active in party politics and union organizing, rising to become departmental secretary of the Bartolina Sisa Confederation. In 2014, the MAS nominated her to accompany Manuel Canelas as his running mate on the party's electoral list. She agreed and was elected to represent the La Paz Department in the Chamber of Deputies. In doing so, Patty became the first Kallawaya woman ever to hold a seat in parliament—elected alongside José Mendoza, together becoming the second and third Kallawaya parliamentarians, after Walter Álvarez.

=== Tenure ===
Sworn in at the beginning of 2015, Patty spent the first three years of her term fulfilling the relatively low-profile role of a substitute deputy. That was until early 2018, when Canelas resigned from the legislature to join the executive branch as vice minister of planning and coordination. In his stead, Patty was sworn in as a primary deputy, with all the added legislative powers the role entailed. After taking office, Patty's public presence did not significantly increase, and she mostly focused her efforts on small-scale projects, such as those promoting Kallawaya culture and medicinal practices.

Following the 2019 political crisis, Patty gained increased notoriety as a staunch critic of interim president Jeanine Áñez, whom she considered partially responsible for the ouster of then-president Evo Morales. Throughout the transition process, Patty issued frequent denunciations against the president and her cabinet, criticizing everything from the government's decision to close down schools amid the COVID-19 pandemic to alleged acts of political corruption. To combat the latter, Patty presented the so-called "Rooting Law", a bill that would prevent government authorities from traveling abroad for a period of six months after leaving office. The legislation was passed into law in September 2020, despite concerns from human rights observers that it violated certain standards, such as the presumption of innocence and freedom of movement.

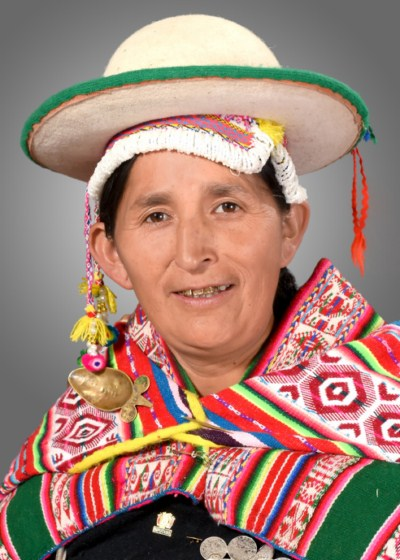
Official portrait, 2017

Patty was not nominated for reelection in the 2019 general election. Following the annulment of those results, her and other parliamentarians' terms of office were extended until new elections could be held; however, she was not among the select few incumbent MAS legislators included on its slate of candidates that cycle either.

=== Commission assignments ===
- Constitution, Legislation, and Electoral System Commission
  - Constitutional Development and Legislation Committee (2016–2018)
  - Democracy and Electoral System Committee (2015–2016)
- Human Rights Commission
  - Gender Rights Committee (2018–2019)
- Social Policy Commission
  - Housing and Public Services Committee (2019–2020)

== Post-parliamentary career ==
=== Coup d'état Case ===
Shortly after the conclusion of her parliamentary term, Patty ramped up her efforts to prosecute those she considered culpable for promoting a "coup d'état" against Morales and his government. Less than a month after leaving office, Patty filed a formal complaint with the Prosecutor's Office against a number of individuals for the crimes of conspiracy, sedition, and terrorism. "These gentlemen have to be tried; they have violated our Constitution," she stated. Although the process—dubbed the Coup d'état Case—was initially only intended to try prominent military and police personnel for their role in the 2019 crisis, it later became the catalyst for the prosecution and eventual detention of Áñez and a number of her former ministers. The process, which netted Áñez a ten-year prison sentence, remains ongoing. Patty continued to call for the prosecution and arrest of other opposition figures, such as Luis Fernando Camacho and former president Carlos Mesa; even some ruling party officials, including Adriana Salvatierra and her own ex-colleague, Manuel Canelas, whom she considered traitors for having negotiated with the opposition.

=== Ombudsman election ===
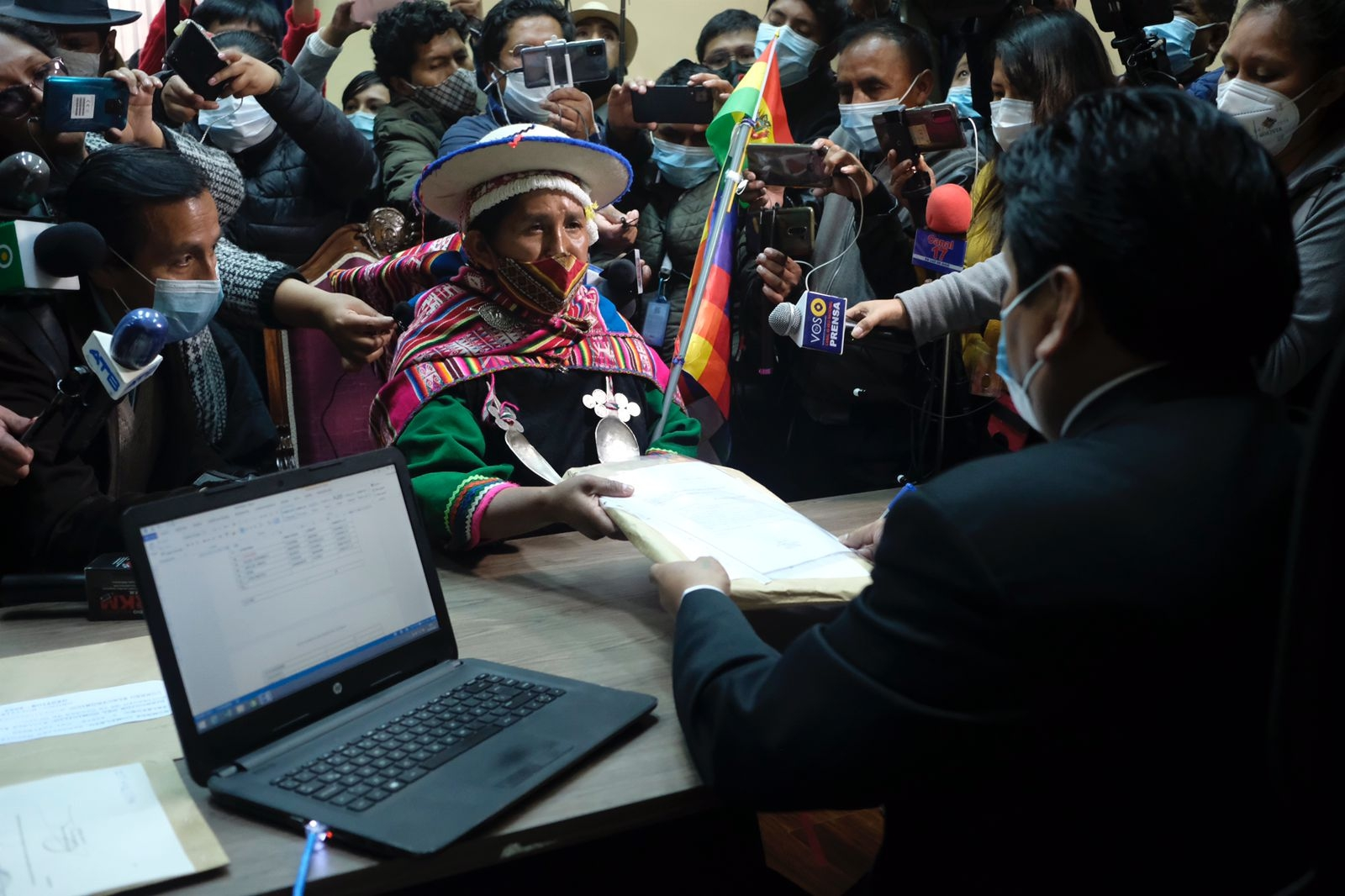
Patty registers her application for the post of ombudsman, 31 March 2022.

Having gained national notoriety for her role in the prosecution of Áñez, Patty announced her intention to launch a bid to become the country's human rights ombudsman. Although the selection process was under the purview of the MAS-majority Legislative Assembly, Patty's active membership within the party hampered her ability to attain the position, as all applicants were required to have been politically independent for at least the past eight years. Patty submitted her application anyway, justifying that the MAS was not a party but a "political instrument ... made up of the Bolivian people." She argued: "if they disqualify me, it will be discrimination because the Constitution comes before the regulations." Patty formally delivered her documentation on the penultimate day of registration, announcing to her supporters her readiness "to enforce the Constitution, enforce the agreements, the laws, the norms that we have ... [I] want to work closely with the people, hand in hand." Ultimately, Patty's candidacy was disqualified, partially on account of her political partisanship, but officially due to her failure to sign her curriculum vitae.

=== Diplomatic service ===
In December 2022, the Senate began considering Patty as a possible contender for a diplomatic role. Specifically, she was nominated to become ambassador to Paraguay, a decision that drew mixed reactions, given her lack of diplomatic experience. For opposition senator Centa Rek, the nomination demonstrated "that positions in embassies are used to fill a quota from some wing of the MAS ... it would be a degradation of diplomatic service. She has no career or accreditation; what role can she have in the foreign service?" For her part, Patty justified that assuming an ambassadorship did not require diplomatic experience. "I have my indigenous, native, peasant diplomacy," she stated, "aboriginal indigenous people also live in Paraguay." "You don't need people that prepare because you learn everything along the way," she added.

By early 2023, Patty's nomination had begun to stall in parliament, a fact she attributed to "discrimination" on the part of opposition legislators, for which she announced her intent to take legal action—a move that, in turn, caused some MAS legislators to sour on her designation. Ultimately, the nomination was dropped, and Patty was instead appointed in May to serve as consul in Puno, Peru. That designation quickly proved controversial with the Peruvian government, given Patty's close relations with Morales, whose operations in southern Peru—one of the then-epicenters of anti-government protests—had strained relations and caused the former president to be barred from entering the country. On 12 June, the Peruvian Foreign Ministry formally requested that the Bolivian government annul Patty's appointment, stating that, in allowing her to exercise diplomatic functions without receiving the necessary exequatur permitting her presence, (Note: Patty entered as a registered member of the Bolivian diplomatic corps on 24 May. Her designation as consul was communicated to the Peruvian Foreign Ministry on 29 May; she entered the country through Desagüadero on 31 May and began exercising diplomatic functions upon arriving in Puno on 1 June. However, an official letter of credence was not sent until 6 June and did not arrive until 8 June—by this point, the Bolivian Embassy had already been informed on 6 June that Patty's designation had not been accepted.) the country was in violation of the Vienna Convention on Consular Relations. The Bolivian Foreign Ministry expressed its disagreement with the Peruvian government's determination, but nonetheless recalled Patty to La Paz the following day. She tendered her resignation shortly thereafter, and was reassigned as vice consul in La Plata, Argentina, in September 2023.

== Electoral history ==
Electoral history of Lidia Patty
Year	Office	Party	Votes			Result	Ref.
Year	Office	Party	Total	%	P.	Result	Ref.
1999	Councillor	Movement for Socialism	102	6.81%	6th	Lost	(Note: Presented on an electoral list. The data shown represents the share of the vote the entire party/alliance received in that constituency.)
2004	Substitute councillor	Movement for Socialism	469	20.67%	3rd	Won	
2014	Substitute deputy	Movement for Socialism	1,006,433	68.92%	1st	Won	
2022	Ombudsman	Movement for Socialism	Disqualified			Lost	
Source: Plurinational Electoral Organ | Electoral Atlas

Chamber of Deputies of Bolivia
Preceded by María Alanoca	Substitute Member of the Chamber of Deputies from La Paz; 2015–2018	Succeeded by Virginia Alanoca
Preceded by Manuel Canelas	Member of the Chamber of Deputies from La Paz; 2018–2020	Succeeded by Freddy López
Diplomatic posts
Preceded by Felipa Huanca	Consul of Bolivia to Puno; 2023	Succeeded by TBD
