= Qachu Quta (Bautista Saavedra) =

Lake in western Bolivia

- Llachu Quta
- Location within Bolivia Location within South America
- Interactive map of Qachu Quta
- Location: Bolivia; La Paz Department, Bautista Saavedra Province, Municipio Charazani
- Coordinates: 15°07′42″S 69°09′15″W
- Max. length: 0.5 km (0.31 mi)
- Max. width: 0.4 km (0.25 mi)
- Surface elevation: 4,466 m (14,652 ft)

Qachu Quta (Aymara qachu female, quta lake, "female lake", Hispanicized spelling Cacho Kkota) or Llachu Quta (Aymara llachu seaweed, "seaweed lake", Hispanicized Llacho Kkota) is a Bolivian lake on the west side of the Apolobamba mountain range. It is situated in the La Paz Department, Bautista Saavedra Province, Charasani Municipality, Charasani Canton, northwest of Charasani, southeast of the Janq'u Qala Lake and east of the small lake named Ch'uxña Quta. Qachu Quta is about 0.9 km long and 0.5 km at its widest point and situated at a height of about 4,466 metres (14,652 ft).

== See also ==
- Apolobamba Integrated Management Natural Area
