= Wila Kunka (Bolivia) =

Mountain in Bolivia

- Location within Bolivia

Highest point
- Elevation: 4,520 m (14,830 ft)
- Coordinates: 15°03′32″S 69°02′02″W

Geography
- Location: Bolivia, La Paz Department
- Parent range: Andes, Apolobamba

Wila Kunka (Aymara wila blood, blood red, kunka throat, also spelled Wila Cunca) is a mountain in the Apolobamba mountain range in Bolivia, about 4,520 metres (14,829 ft) high. It is situated in the La Paz Department, Bautista Saavedra Province, Curva Municipality. Wila Kunka lies south of the mountains Ulla Qhaya and Iskillani.
