= Puquina language =

Extinct language of South America

Puquina
- Pukina
- Pukina juyai
- Native to: Bolivia, Peru
- Region: Lake Titicaca
- Ethnicity: Tiwanaku
- Extinct: early 19th century
- Language family: Puquina: Puquina

Official status
- Official language in: Bolivia

Language codes
- ISO 639-3: puq
- Glottolog: puqu1242
- Linguasphere: 84-KAA-aa
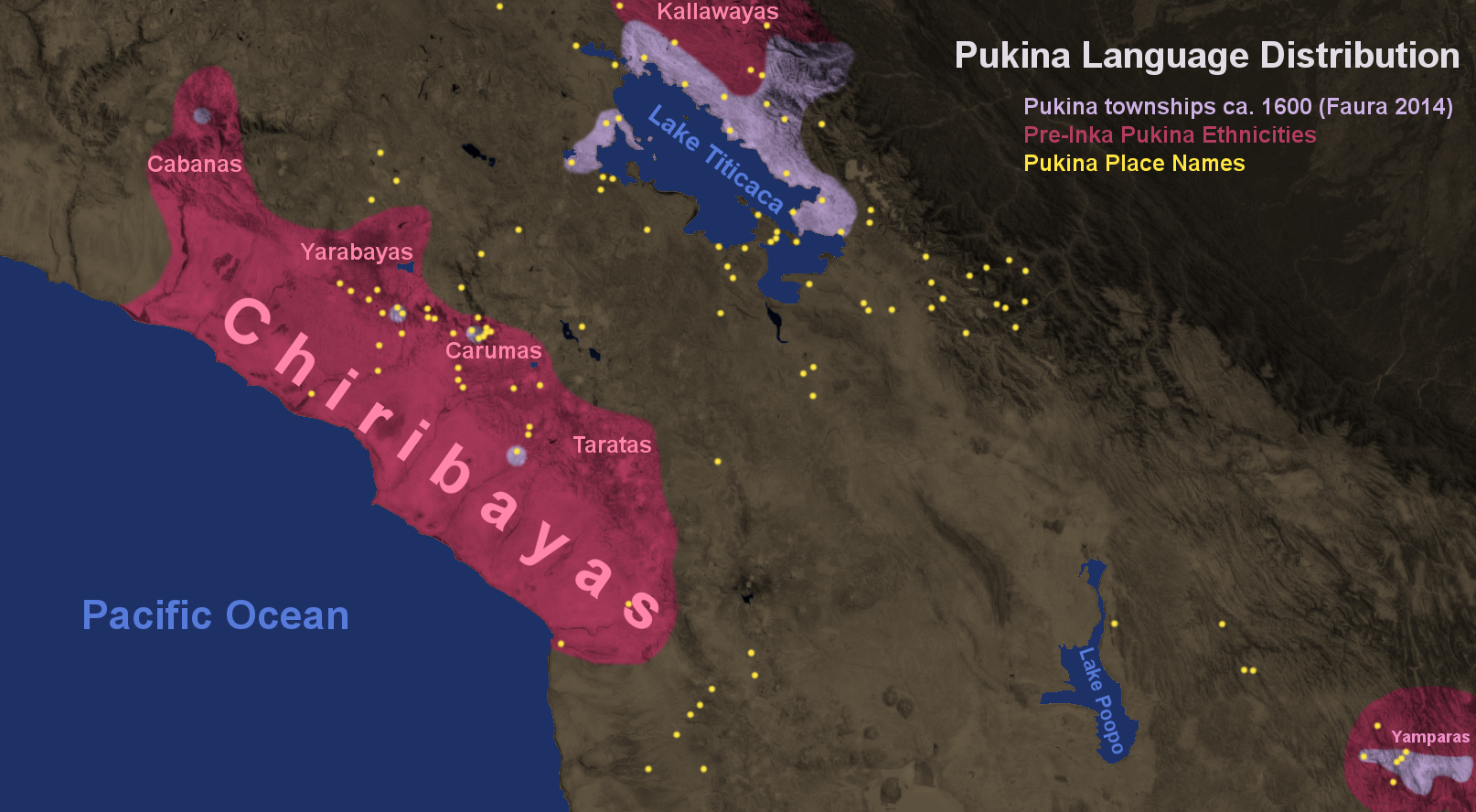
- Pukina language distribution around 1600 CE, Pukina toponyms, and pre-Inca Pukina ethnicities

Puquina (or Pukina) is an extinct language once spoken in the region surrounding Lake Titicaca (Peru and Bolivia) and in the north of Chile. It is often associated with the culture that built Tiwanaku. It is one of the official languages of Bolivia. Written historical sources of the language are limited, primarily the 1607 document by Franciscan Luis Jerónimo de Oré, Rituale seu Manuale Peruanum. A Puquina substrate can be found in the Quechuan and Spanish languages spoken in the south of Peru, mainly in Arequipa, Moquegua and Tacna, as well as in Bolivia. Puquina has provided much of the vocabulary in the Kallawaya language, which is a mixed language formed from Quechua grammar, specifically from the Ayacucho or Cusco Quechua varieties, and Puquina vocabulary.

Puquina was granted official language status in Bolivia in 2009. A traditional community of Puquina speakers was recognized by Bolivia's Pelechuco municipality, north of Lake Titicaca, in 2022, and by the country's official Plurinational Institute for the Study of Languages and Cultures (Instituto Plurinacional de Estudio de Lenguas y Culturas, IPELC) in 2023. A total of 311 Bolivians reported speaking Puquina in the 2024 census.

Sometimes the term Puquina is used for the Uru language, which is completely unrelated.

== History ==
=== Documentation ===
The primary source for Puquina is the Rituale seu Manuale Peruanum, a 1607 book by Luis Jerónimo de Oré, a Franciscan priest. The Rituale contains around 3,750 grammatical words in Puqina (depending on how words are counted). Oré claimed he had copied much of his material in Puquina from another work by the Jesuit Alonzo de Barcena. Barcena himself had previously published a book on Puquina in 1590 in Lima, but it has since been lost.

== Speakers ==
In 2022, the Plurinational Institute for the Study of Languages and Cultures (Instituto Plurinacional de Estudio de Lenguas y Culturas, IPELC), had stated that the Puquina language was under study and possibly extinct. However, in that same year, a municipal resolution in Pelechuco (northern La Paz Department) recognized the traditional indigenous authorities of the Marka Cololo Copacabana Antaquilla - Nación Puquina, including as speakers of the language. In January 2023, the Plurinational Institute met with these Puquina authorities and began the process of establishing a Puquina Language and Culture Institute (Instituto de Lengua y Cultura Puquina).

The 2024 Bolivian Census registered 311 people as speakers of the Puquina language, of whom 158 live in Pelechuco municipality. This was an increase from the 174 recorded in 2012.

== Classification ==
Puquina has been considered an unclassified language, since it has not been proven to be firmly related to any other language in the Andean region. A relationship with the Arawakan languages has long been suggested, based solely on the possessive paradigm (1st no-, 2nd pi-, 3rd ču-), which is similar to the proto-Arawakan subject forms (1st * nu-, 2nd * pi-, 3ª * tʰu-). Further possible lexical cognates between Puquina and the Arawakan languages have recently been found that could support placing the language within a putative Macro-Arawakan family, along with the Candoshi and the Munichi languages. However, such a hypothesis still lacks conclusive evidence.

In this regard, Adelaar and van de Kerke (2009: 126) have pointed out that if in fact the Puquina language is genetically related to the Arawakan languages, its separation from this family must have occurred at a relatively early date; the authors further suggest that in such a case the location of the Puquina speakers should be taken into account in the debate over the geographic origin of the Arawakan family. Such consideration was taken up by Jolkesky (op. cit., 611–616) in his archaeo-ecolinguistic model of diversification of the Macro-Arawakan languages. According to this author, the proto-Macro-Arawakan language would have been spoken in the Middle Ucayali River Basin during the beginning of the 2nd millennium BCE and its speakers would have produced in this region the Tutishcainyo pottery.

== Proposed Inca affiliation ==
The linguist Rodolfo Cerrón Palomino proposed that "Qhapaq Simi", the cryptic language of the nobility of the Inca Empire, was closely related to Puquina, and that Runa Simi (Quechuan languages) were spoken by commoners; this proposal is known as the "Puquinist Hypothesis" Alfredo Torero, a scholar of the Puquina language, has refuted the "Puquinist hypothesis", arguing that Qhapaq Simi was a variant of the Aru or Aymara language family.

Moulian et al. (2015) argue that Puquina influenced Mapudungun of southern Chile long before the rise of the Inca Empire. This areal linguistic influence may have started with a migratory wave arising from the collapse of the Tiwanaku empire around 1000 CE.

== Phonology ==
=== Consonants ===
	Labial	Alveolar	Palatal	Velar	Uvular	Glottal
Nasal	m	n	ɲ			
Plosive	p	t	tʃ	k	q	ʔ
Fricative		s	ʃ		h~χ	
Lateral		l	ʎ			
Approximant	w		j			
Trill		r				

- /h/ may also be heard as a uvular fricative [χ].
- /ʎ/ may also be heard as a voiced palatal affricate [dʒ].

=== Vowels ===
	Front	Central	Back
Close	i		(u)
Mid	e		(o)
Open		a	

- /o/ and /u/ may not be contrastive, though there are some minimal pairs (e.g. no 'my' and nu 'who'.).

== Vocabulary ==
=== Numerals ===
Numerals in Puquina
Numeral	Puquina
1	pesq
2	so
3	qapa
4	sper
5	taqpa
6	chichun
7	stu
8	kina
9	cheqa
10	sqara

=== Pronouns ===
Pronouns in Puquina
English	Puquina
I	ni
you (sg.)	pi
he	chu, hi
we (inclusive)	nich
we (exclusive)	señ
you (pl.)	pich
they	chuch

== Sample text ==
The Lord's Prayer in Puquina:

Señ yqui, hanigopacas cunana ascheno, po mana vpallisuhanra: po capaca aschano señ guta huachonta, po hatano callacaso hanta, quiguri hanigopa casna ehe eahu cohuacasna hamp: Kaa gamenque ehehesuma. Señ guta camen señ tanta, señ hochaghe pampache sumao, quiguiri señ señ guta huchachasqueno gata pampachanganch cagu. Ama èhe acrosuma huchaguta señ hotonouà enahata entoriana quespina sumau. Amen.
