= Kallawaya =

Indigenous group in the Andes

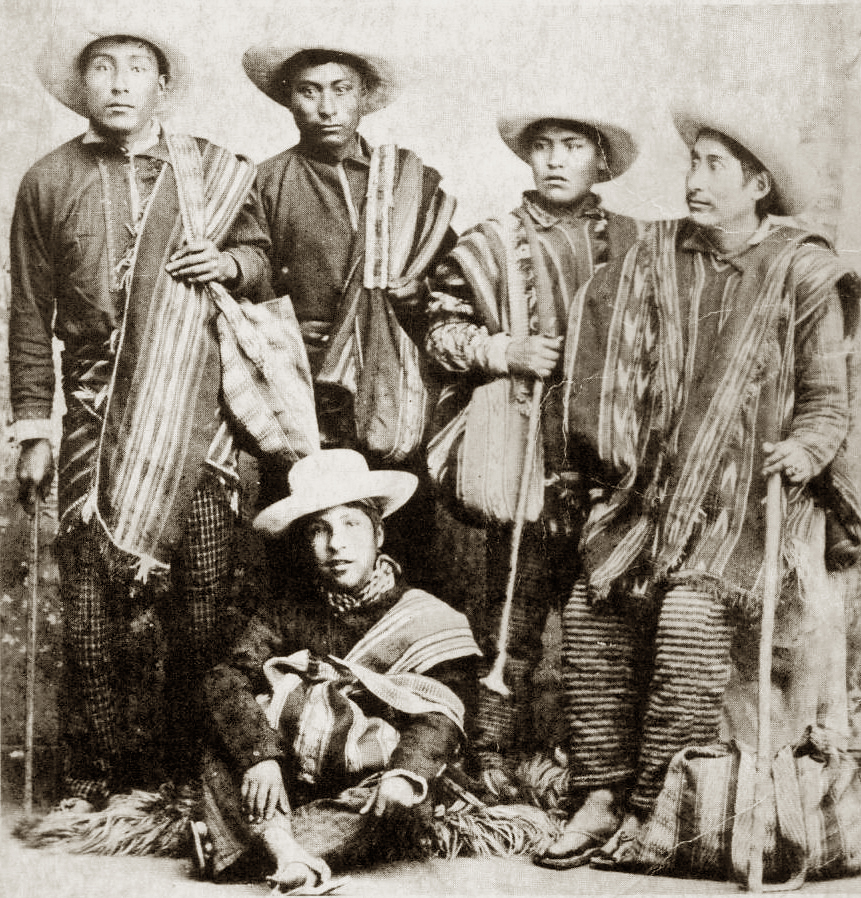
A group of Kallawaya, c. 1900.

The Kallawaya are an indigenous group living in the Andes of Bolivia. They live in the Bautista Saavedra Province and Muñecas Province of the La Paz Department but are best known for being an itinerant group of traditional healers that travel on foot to reach their patients. According to the UNESCO Safeguarding Project, the Kallawaya can be traced to the pre-Inca period as direct descendants of the Tiwanaku and Mollo cultures, meaning their existence has lasted approximately 1,000 years. They are known to have performed complex procedures like brain surgery alongside their continuous use of medicinal plants as early as 700 AD. Most famously, they are known to have helped to save thousands of lives during the construction of the Panama Canal, in which they used traditional plant remedies to treat the malaria epidemic. Some historical sources even cite the Kallawayas as the first to use quinine to prevent and control malaria. In 2012, there were 11,662 Kallawaya throughout Bolivia.

== Etymology ==
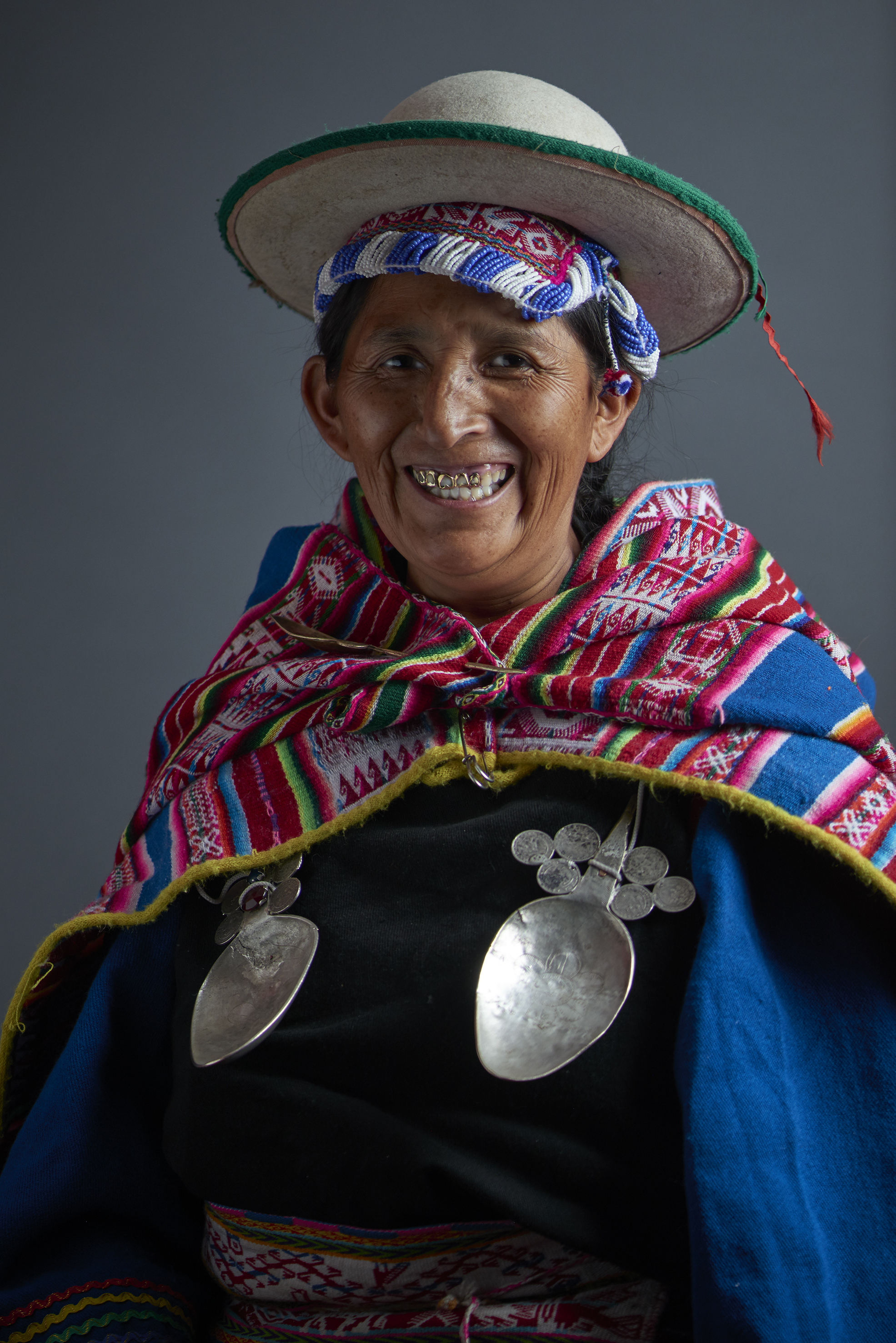
A Kallawaya woman, politician Lidia Patty in traditional garb.

According to Enrique Oblitas Poblete, a Bolivian ethnobotanical specialist, Kallawaya may be a corruption of khalla-wayai ("beginning of a drink offering") or k'alla or k'alli wayai ("entrance into priesthood"). However, there is no evidence as to whether this name is strictly a Quechua or Aymara word, a word of Puquina origin, or a word derived from the Kallawaya themselves.

== Healers ==
Kallawaya doctors (médicos Kallawaya) are known as the naturopathic healers of Inca kings, and as keepers of scientific knowledge. Kallawaya women are often midwives, treating gynecological disorders, and pediatric patients, but it is the men of the community that are primarily taught to be the natural healers. Kallawaya healers travel through northwestern Bolivia and parts of Argentina, Chile, Ecuador, Panama, and Peru. Often they are on foot, walking ancient Inca trails, through the tropics, mountain valleys and highland plateaus, while looking for traditional herbs.

The knowledge that the Kallawaya principally concern themselves with surrounds the medicinal properties of plants, animals and minerals. While most Kallawaya healers understand how to properly use about 300 plants and specialists learn up to 600, it is widely thought that these healers collectively know how to utilize 900 plant species found across the Andean region. These plants are a mixture of those found in the Amazonia, the altiplano, and the mid-Andean region. These plants are also a mixture of indigenous and exotic plant species, as studies have shown that about 30 of the known plants in their pharmacopoeia were introduced from Africa, Europe, or South Asia.

The Kallawaya base their healing on the belief that the spiritual world and the natural world are connected in the human body. In order for a person to be healthy, they must be in harmony with their surrounding environment. Sickness, therefore, is the result of a disconnection between that person and their natural surroundings. To maintain natural balances, Kallawaya healing practices are based on the prevention, treatment, and curing of both physical and mental illnesses. However, these practices can vary depending on where the Kallawaya treat their patients. In the rural villages that they frequent, preventative medicine is more common, while reactive treatments are more common in the cities that they are allowed to practice.

Prior to leaving their homes to heal the sick, the Kallawayas perform a ceremonial dance. The dance and regalia are expressed as the yatiri ("healer"). The choreography is noted for the llantucha of suri, clothing made of rhea feathers and used as protection against the elements while they travel to their patients, carrying khapchos ("male bags") that contain herbs, mixes, and talismans. Groups of musicians perform Kantu, playing drums and pan flutes during the ritual ceremonies to establish contact with the spirit world before the healer visits patients.

Until the early 21st century, Kallawaya healing practices were illegal across Bolivia and other Andean nations. By law, only those physicians who were considered “conventional doctors”, meaning that they had Western-style medical diplomas, were allowed to practice medicine. With the formation of the Sociedad Boliviana de Medicina Tradicional (SOBOMETRA) in 1984, traditional medicine was finally brought to the attention of the Bolivian government. Legislations passed because of the influence of SOBOMETRA still restricted the Kallawaya until international influence pressured Bolivia to making it legal. This is partially credited to the 2003 declaration of cultural preservation by UNESCO and the election of indigenous president Evo Morales in 2006, who used his influence to reinforce the credibility of naturalistic medicine.

== Language ==
The language of their trade is the Kallawaya language, also referred to by the community as Machaj juyay, and is only used in the context of medicinal practices and rituals. The language is thought to be based on basic Quechua grammar alongside vocabulary based on the now extinct Puquina language. Recent studies, however, have noted that the primary lexicon stems from the southern Quechua dialects of Ayacuchano and Cuzqueño, reflective of their region of origin. Because of their ability to retain esoteric vocabulary, as well, the language also contains lexicology from the Aymara language, the Uru-Chipaya language, Spanish, the Kunza language, Tacanan languages, as well as other languages that have not been analyzed.

Generally, the conversational language of the community is the Quechua language. The ritual Kallawaya language is not taught as the primary; rather, it is taught as a second language in order to initiate a new healer into the community. Because of this, Machaj juyay is considered around the world to be a critically endangered language, which have started to be preserved by non-profit organizations such as the Living Tongues Institute for Endangered Languages.

== Kallawayas sin Fronteras (KASFRO) ==
In 2006, a group of young Kallawayan healers founded the non-profit organization ‘’Kallawayas sin Fronteras’’(KASFRO) in the Cochabamba Department of Bolivia. The organization was founded on the premise of preserving the heritage of the Kallawaya people as they transition from small villages to larger cities. They define their activities on four goals: to promote the ethics and morality of Kallawaya treatment practices; to unify and sustain the unity of all Kallawayas and Kallawaya entities; to optimize and update Kallawaya knowledge from one generation to another; and to promote the systemization of the registration of Kallawaya healers in the national health system. All of these activities are designed to allow the elders of the community to interact with the younger generation, systematically pass on their knowledge, and begin the documentation of these healing practices.

Healers wishing to become members of KASFRO must pass several criteria that are reviewed by the eight ayllus of the community. First, the person must have been born in the villages of either Charazani or Curva and currently be practicing Kallawaya medicine. Once these claims have been proven, the healer must present a résumé or curriculum vitae defining their Kallawaya lineage, with family members from one of the sixty Kallawaya families who are currently members ready to prove themselves as relations to that healer. The ayllu leaders will then decide on the healer’s eligibility.

KASFRO is also involved in the general preservation of the knowledge of other indigenous groups. Upon its founding, it joined the Latin American online database “Red de Información Indígena” in order to gain recognition on an international platform. It also has partnered with other indigenous health organizations across Bolivia to gain official recognition from the government, since these groups have not been allowed to join the national health registry. Even though KASFRO has not been allowed to join the registry, there has been recurring international pressure from UNESCO to allow these groups to be recognized.

Alongside these activities, KASFRO has been promoting activities that would institutionalize indigenous medicinal practices across the nation. In 2009, KASFRO was instrumental in the creation of the Consejo Departamental de Medicina Tradicional (CODEMETRA), an organization representing 20 indigenous doctor organizations in the Cochabamba Department. Once CODEMETRA was established, other departments across Bolivia created similar organizations that came together for the first time in 2012 as the National Council for Indigenous Medicine. This council has been influential on the national and departmental governments across Bolivia and still meets annually.
