= Janq'u Qala Lake =

Lake in Bolivia

Janq'u Qala
- Location within Bolivia Location within South America
- Interactive map of Janq'u Qala
- Location: Bolivia, La Paz Department, Bautista Saavedra Province, Curva Municipality
- Coordinates: 15°03′50″S 69°11′40″W
- Surface elevation: 4,489 m (14,728 ft)

Janq'u Qala (Aymara janq'u white, qala stone, "white stone", Hispanicized spelling Jankho Khala) is a lake on the western side of the Apolobamba mountain range of Bolivia situated in the La Paz Department, Bautista Saavedra Province, Curva Municipality. It lies about 4,489 metres (14,728 ft) above sea level. The lake is about 3.25 km long and 0.47 km at its widest point.

Janq'u Qala gets waters from Ulla Qhaya northeast of it. This stream named Q'añuma Jawira ("dirty water river", Cañuma Jahuira, Cunuma Jahuira) also connects Ch'uxña Quta which lies west of Ulla Qhaya with Janq'u Qala southwest of it as it flows down to Such'i River.
