= Ch'uxña Quta (Charasani) =

Lake in Bolivia

- Location within Bolivia Location within South America
- Interactive map of Ch'uxña Quta
- Location: Bolivia, La Paz Department, Bautista Saavedra Province, Charasani Municipality
- Coordinates: 15°7′43″S 69°9′12″W
- Basin countries: Bolivia
- Max. length: 1.23 miles (1.98 km)
- Max. width: 0.75 miles (1.21 km)
- Surface elevation: 4,454 m (14,613 ft)

Ch'uxña Quta (Aymara ch'uxña green, "green lake", hispanicized spelling Chojña Kkota) is a lake on the west side of the Apolobamba mountain range of Bolivia situated in the La Paz Department, Bautista Saavedra Province, Charasani Municipality, Charasani Canton. It is situated east of Such'i River, southeast of the larger lake Janq'u Qala and west of Qachu Quta (Llachu Quta).

== See also ==
- Apolobamba Integrated Management Natural Area
