= Kallawaya language =

Endangered mixed language of Bolivia

Kallawaya
- Pohena, Qollahuaya
- Machaj juyay
- Native to: Bolivia
- Region: La Paz Department: Charazani; highlands north of Lake Titicaca
- Ethnicity: Kallawaya
- Native speakers: L1: none L2: 10–20
- Language family: mixed Puquina–Quechua: Kallawaya

Official status
- Official language in: Bolivia

Language codes
- ISO 639-3: caw
- Glottolog: call1235
- ELP: Kallawaya
- Linguasphere: 84-LAA-aa

Kallawaya, also Callahuaya or Callawalla (Callawalla: Machaj Juyai, meaning 'folk language' or 'speech of the men'), is an endangered, secret, mixed language in Bolivia; another name sometimes used for the language is Pohena. It is spoken by the Kallawaya people, a group of traditional itinerant healers in the Andes in their medicinal healing practice living in Charazani, the highlands north of Lake Titicaca, and Tipuani.

== Characteristics ==
Kallawaya is a mixed language. The grammar is partially Quechua in morphology, but most of its words are from either unknown sources or from an otherwise extinct language family, Pukina. Pukina was abandoned in favor of Quechua, Aymara, and Spanish.

Kallawaya is also a secret language, passed only by father to son, or grandfather to grandson, or rarely, to daughters if a practitioner has no sons. It is not used in normal family dialogue. Although its use is primarily ritual, used secretly for initiated men, Kallawaya may be a part of everyday conversation between those familiar with it.

Kallawaya was one of the subjects of Ironbound Films' 2008 American documentary film The Linguists, in which two linguists attempted to document several moribund languages.

Bolivians refer to the region where the speakers live as "Qollahuayas," meaning "place of the medicines", because the Kallawaya are renowned herbalists. Since they treat or cure with plants, minerals, animal products, and rituals, peasants refer to the speakers as "Qolla kapachayuh", meaning "lords of the medicine bag".

== Phonology ==
=== Consonants ===
		Labial	Alveolar	Palatal	Velar	Uvular
Plosive/ Affricate	voiceless	p	t	tʃ	k	q
Plosive/ Affricate	aspirated	pʰ	tʰ	tʃʰ	kʰ	qʰ
Plosive/ Affricate	ejective	pʼ	tʼ	tʃʼ	kʼ	qʼ
Fricative			s	ʃ	x	
Nasal		m	n	ɲ		
Trill			r			
Approximant	lateral		l	ʎ		
Approximant	central	w		j		

=== Vowels ===
	Front	Central	Back
Close	i iː		u uː
Mid	e eː		o oː
Open		a aː	
