= Macro-Arawakan languages =

Proposed language family

Macro-Arawakan
- Arawakan
- (controversial)
- Geographic distribution: Widest geographical area of any language group in Latin America, see Geographic distribution.
- Linguistic classification: Proposed language family
- Subdivisions: Arawakan (Maipurean); ? Guajiboan; ? Arawan; ? Candoshi-Shapra; ? Harákmbut; ? Puquina; ? Munichi

Language codes
- Glottolog: None
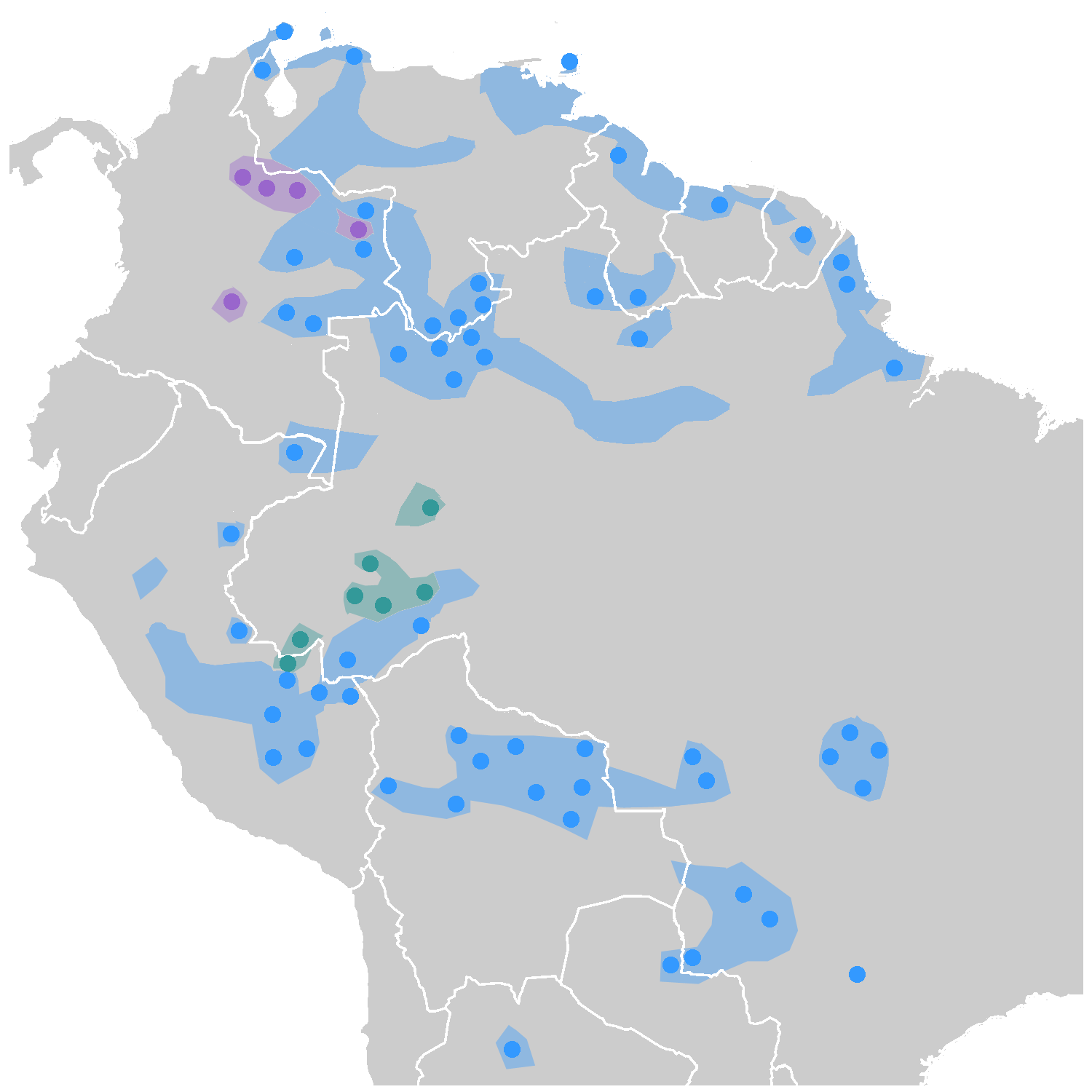
- Arawakan languages (blue dots), Guajiboan languages (violet dots), and Arauan languages (green dots). Paler areas represent probable extension at the time of contact.

Macro-Arawakan is a proposed language family of South America and the Caribbean centered on the Arawakan languages.

== Proposals ==
Kaufman (1990) includes the following:

  - Arawakan (Maipurean)
  - Arawan
  - Guajiboan
  - Candoshi

Payne (1991) and Derbyshire (1992) have:

  - Arawakan (Maipurean)
  - Arawan
  - Guajiboan
  - Puquina
  - Harakmbet

Jolkesky (2016) argues for the following:

  - Arawakan (Maipurean)
  - Candoshi
  - Puquina
  - Munichi

According to Jolkesky (2016: 611–616), the Proto-Macro-Arawakan language would have been spoken in the Middle Ucayali River Basin during the beginning of the 2nd millennium BCE, and its speakers would have produced Tutishcainyo pottery in the region.

Martins (2005: 342–370) groups the Arawakan and Nadahup languages together as part of a proposed Makúan-Arawakan (Nadahup-Arawakan) family, but this proposal has been rejected by Aikhenvald (2006: 237).

Carvalho (2021) notes that the Arawakan and Arawan families have had significant long-term mutual interaction, but does not consider the two language families to be related. He further proposes that the Juruá-Purus linguistic corridor facilitated the migration of Arawakan speakers to the southern fringes of the Amazon basin.

== Pronouns ==
Pronominal system of the Macro-Arawakan languages:

language	I	you (sg)	he/she/it	we	you (pl)	they
Proto-Arawakan	*nu/*ni-	*pɨ-	*tʰu	*wi/*wa-	*hi-	*ra-
Munichi	-nɨ/-ɲɨ	-pɨ	-	-wɨ	-di	-ra ‘3’
Puquina	no, -ni-;	po, -p-, -pi	ʧu, -su-	-	-	-
Candoshi	no	-	su-	ija, iː	si	-
Yanesha'	na, no, ne	pʲa, pʲo, pe	-	ja, jo, je	sa, so, se	-
Aguachile	ni	pi	-	waʔaha	-	-

== Lexicon ==
Several words in the basic lexicon of the Macro-Arawakan languages were pointed out as possible cognates:

language	father	eye	neck	hair	bone	firewood	dung	sleep	die	house	tooth	stone	water	sky
Proto-Arawakan	*apa	*uke	*ʧano	*si	*napɨ	*tsɨma	*itika	*maka	*kama	*pana, *ponku	*ahtse	*kʰiba	*uni	*enu
Munichi	–	ukɨ (head)	–	uɕi	–	ʧu(-sɨ) ('fire')	kʲa	–	kma	hna	di	–	idɨ	–
Puquina	–	juqe	–	–	–	–	–	miha	–	–	–	–	unu	haniɡo ('high')
Candoshi	apaː	–	ʂano	ʃi	nap	somaː-si ('fire')	ʧikaː	makija	–	paNkoː	nas	–	–	kaniːNta
Yanesha'	apa	–	ʧnoːpʲ	ʃe	napo	ʦoːm	tʲoʔj	-maʔ	ʐomu	pokoːlʲ	ahs	–	onʲ	enet
Aguachile	–	–	asanu	–	–	–	–	–	–	pani(ʃi)	asi	ipa	–	enui

== Bibliography ==
- Aikhenvald, Alexandra Y. (1999). The Arawak language family. In R. M. W. Dixon & A. Y. Aikhenvald (Eds.), The Amazonian languages. Cambridge: Cambridge University Press. ISBN 0-521-57021-2; ISBN 0-521-57893-0.
- Campbell, Lyle. (1997). American Indian languages: The historical linguistics of Native America. New York: Oxford University Press. ISBN 0-19-509427-1.
- Kaufman, Terrence. (1994). The native languages of South America. In C. Mosley & R. E. Asher (Eds.), Atlas of the world's languages (pp. 46–76). London: Routledge.
- Payne, David. (1991). A classification of Maipuran (Arawakan) languages based on shared lexical retentions. In D. C. Derbyshire & G. K. Pullum (Eds.), Handbook of Amazonian languages (Vol. 3, pp. 355–499). Berlin: Mouton de Gruyter.
- Derbyshire, Desmond C. (1992). Arawakan languages. In W. Bright (Ed.), International encyclopedia of linguistics (Vol. 1, pp. 102–105). New Oxford: Oxford University Press.
- Kaufman, Terrence. (1990). Language history in South America: What we know and how to know more. In D. L. Payne (Ed.), Amazonian linguistics: Studies in lowland South American languages (pp. 13–67). Austin: University of Texas Press. ISBN 0-292-70414-3.
- Migliazza, Ernest C.; & Campbell, Lyle. (1988). Panorama general de las lenguas indígenas en América (pp. 223). Historia general de América (Vol. 10). Caracas: Instituto Panamericano de Geografía e Historia.
- Byrne, James. (1885). General principles of the structure of language – Grammatical Sktches: Arawak (pp. 198 ff)
- Brinton, D. G., (1871). The Arawak Language of Guiana in its Linguistic and Ethnological Relations Philadelphia: McCalla & Stavely. (pp. 18)
