= General Juan José Pérez Municipality =

General Juan José Pérez Municipality / Charazani Municipality
- Municipality
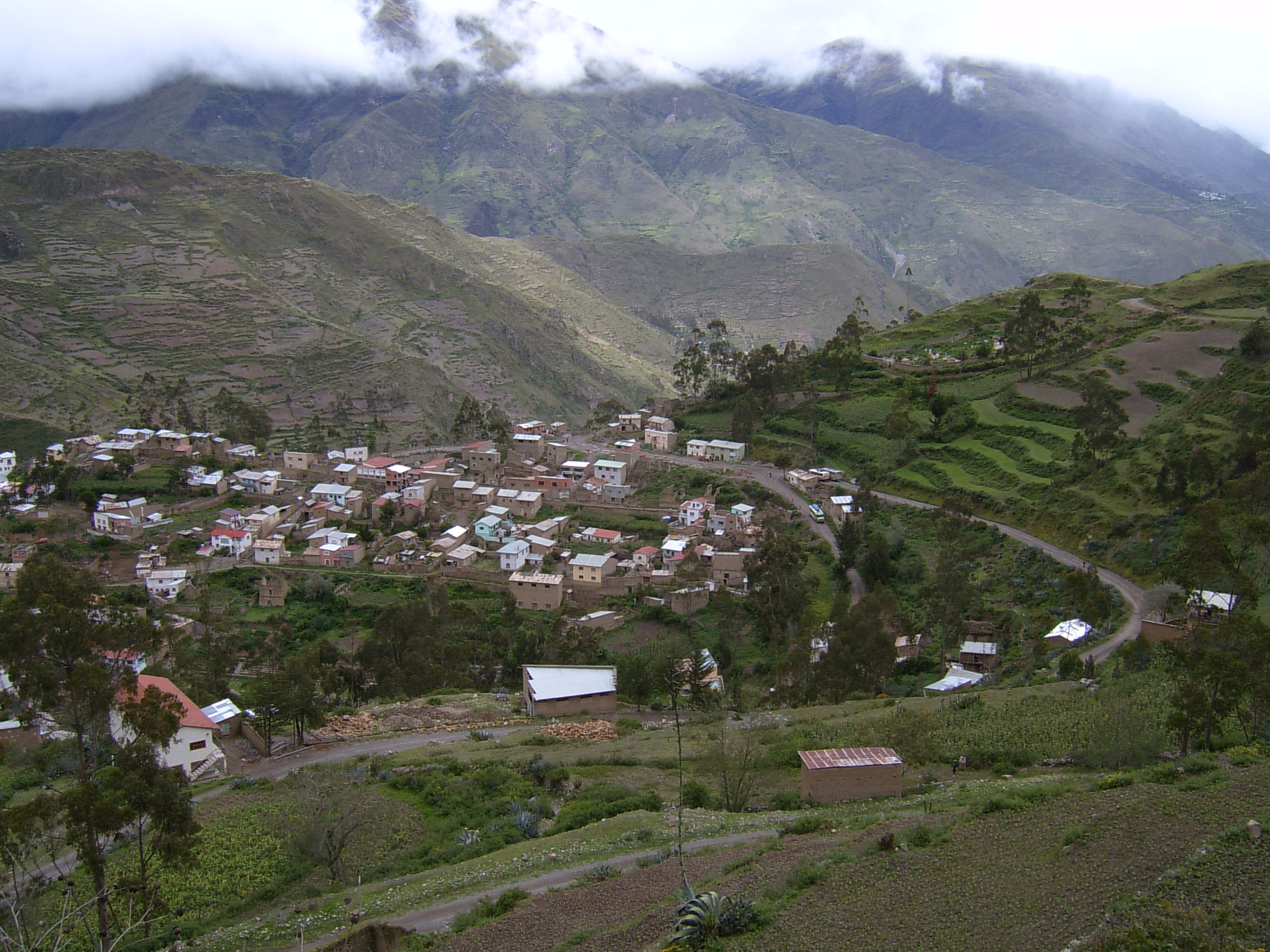
- Charazani

- Location within Bolivia
- Coordinates: 15°5′S 68°45′W
- Country: Bolivia
- Department: La Paz Department
- Province: Bautista Saavedra Province
- Seat: Charazani

Population (2001)
  - Total: 9,161
- Time zone: UTC-4 (BOT)

General Juan José Pérez Municipality or Charazani Municipality is the first municipal section of the Bautista Saavedra Province in the La Paz Department, Bolivia. Its seat is Charazani.

== See also ==
- Ch'uxña Quta
- Qachu Quta
