= Supay Punku =

Mountain in Bolivia

- Location within Bolivia

Highest point
- Elevation: 4,600 m (15,100 ft)
- Coordinates: 14°53′07″S 68°55′35″W

Geography
- Location: Bolivia, La Paz Department
- Parent range: Andes

Supay Punku (Quechua supay devil, demon, punku door, "devil door") or Supay P'unqu (Quechua p'unqu pond, dam, "devil pond" or "devil dam") is a mountain east of the Apolobamba mountain range in Bolivia, about 4,600 metres (15,092 ft) high. It is situated in the La Paz Department, Bautista Saavedra Province, Curva Municipality, and in the Franz Tamayo Province, Pelechuco Municipality.
