= Qillwa Quta (Bolivia) =

Mountain in Bolivia

- Location within Bolivia

Highest point
- Elevation: 4,900 m (16,100 ft)
- Coordinates: 14°57′10″S 68°58′01″W

Geography
- Location: Bolivia, La Paz Department
- Parent range: Andes, Apolobamba

Qillwa Quta (Aymara qillwa, qiwña, qiwlla Andean gull, quta lake, "gull lake", also spelled Kellhuacota) is a mountain in the eastern extensions of the Apolobamba mountain range in Bolivia, about 4,900 metres (16,076 ft) high. It is situated in the La Paz Department, Bautista Saavedra Province, Curva Municipality.
