= María Alanoca =

Bolivian politician (born 1960)

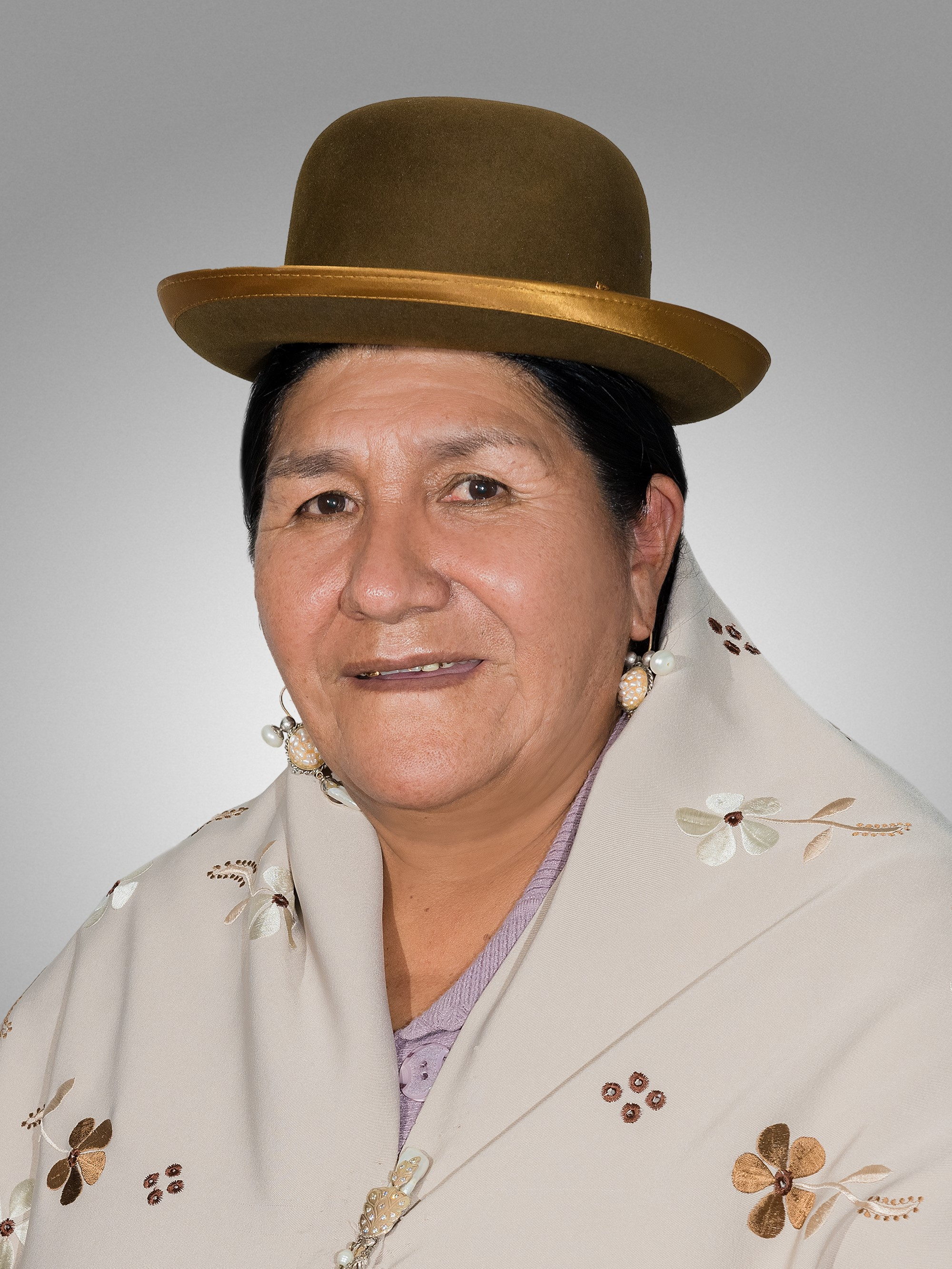
- Official portrait, 2020

Member of the Chamber of Deputies from La Paz
- Incumbent
- Assumed office 3 November 2020
- Substitute: Zacarías Laura
- Preceded by: Saturnino Quispe
- Constituency: Circumscription 10 (El Alto)
- Substitute; 25 January 2010 – 18 January 2015
- Deputy: Wilfredo Calani
- Preceded by: Santusa Calizaya
- Succeeded by: Lidia Patty
- Constituency: Party list

Personal details
- Born: María Alanoca Tinta; 2 December 1960 (age 65) Chipamaya, La Paz, Bolivia
- Party: Movement for Socialism (2000–present)
- Occupation: Politician; trade unionist

María Alanoca Tinta (born 2 December 1960) is a Bolivian politician and trade unionist serving as a member of the Chamber of Deputies from La Paz, representing circumscription 10 since 2020. A member of the Movement for Socialism, she represented the same department as a substitute alongside Wilfredo Calani from 2010 to 2015.

Raised in the Los Andes Province of rural La Paz Department, Alanoca spent her youth employed as a palliri in the mines of Sud Yungas Province. She settled in El Alto at age 17, working as a street vendor in the city's commercial district, an area dominated by the informal sector of the economy. An affiliate of the merchants' guilds representing El Alto's small traders, she served as general secretary of the union overseeing the La Ceja district in the mid-1990s.

Alanoca was a founding member of a local branch of the Movement for Socialism in El Alto and held a seat on its directorate in 2000. Having served once before in the Chamber of Deputies as a substitute from 2010 to 2015, she was elected in 2019 and again in 2020 to her own seat representing circumscription 10 of El Alto in the lower chamber. A staunch supporter of party leader Evo Morales, she aligns with the evista wing of the Movement for Socialism in parliament, which distanced itself from the incumbent government of Luis Arce and operates in semi-opposition.

== Early life and career ==
=== Background and early life ===
María Alanoca was born on 2 December 1960 in Chipamaya, a rural settlement in the Los Andes Province of central La Paz Department. She was raised in an impoverished Aymara household alongside seven siblings to parents employed in the mining industry. Her father was a laborer at Bolsa Negra Mine in the distant village of Lambate, located in the Irupana Municipality of Sud Yungas Province.

Alanoca began working the mines of provincial La Paz Department at the age of 12; a time when the presence of female laborers was exceedingly rare and considered taboo – even prohibited on some sites for fear of "bad luck". She made a modest wage as a palliri, (Note: From the Quechua 'to harvest' or 'to collect'; the term is exclusively used to denote the work performed by female mineworkers.) pulverizing rocks and sifting through the resulting pulp in search of valuable ores.

=== Career and trade unionism ===
Fleeing poverty, Alanoca settled in El Alto at the age of 17, accompanying a trend of migration among inhabitants of the Altiplano out of the countryside and into the fast-urbanizing city. El Alto grew at an accelerated pace throughout the 1970s to '90s, bolstered by the arrival of mineworkers dismissed following the closure of state mines – by the early 2000s, "entire neighborhoods [were] made up of ex-miners."

She set up shop as a street vendor, selling condiments to the market-goers of La Ceja, the city's bustling commercial district. As with most small traders in the informal sector, an affiliation with the numerous guilds representing El Alto's merchants followed shortly thereafter. (Note: The informal sector – defined as enterprises operating "outside the law"; unregulated and usually untaxed – constitutes a significant portion of Bolivia's economy, and the formal and informal markets frequently interact. Most of the country's small merchants, retailers, and vendors – known as gremialistas 'guild members'; lit. 'guildists' – self-organize into gremios 'guilds', which are recognized by and negotiate with government authorities.) By the mid-1990s, Alanoca had risen to the post of general secretary of La Ceja's vendors' guild, representing one of the more populous areas of the city.

== Chamber of Deputies ==
=== Election ===
Alanoca was a founding member of the Movement for Socialism (MAS) in circumscription 10 of El Alto, (Note: Part of circumscription 13 until redistribution following the 2012 census.) the district encompassing the city's north-central zones: villas 16 de Julio, Germán Busch, Ingenio, and Tunari, the Alto Lima, Los Andes, and Puerto Mejillones barrios, as well as the northern reaches nearing the foothills of Huayna Potosí. She served on the party's local branch directorate in 2000 alongside other regional leaders – including Vladimir Alarcón, who later represented the then-13th district in the Constituent Assembly.

External videos
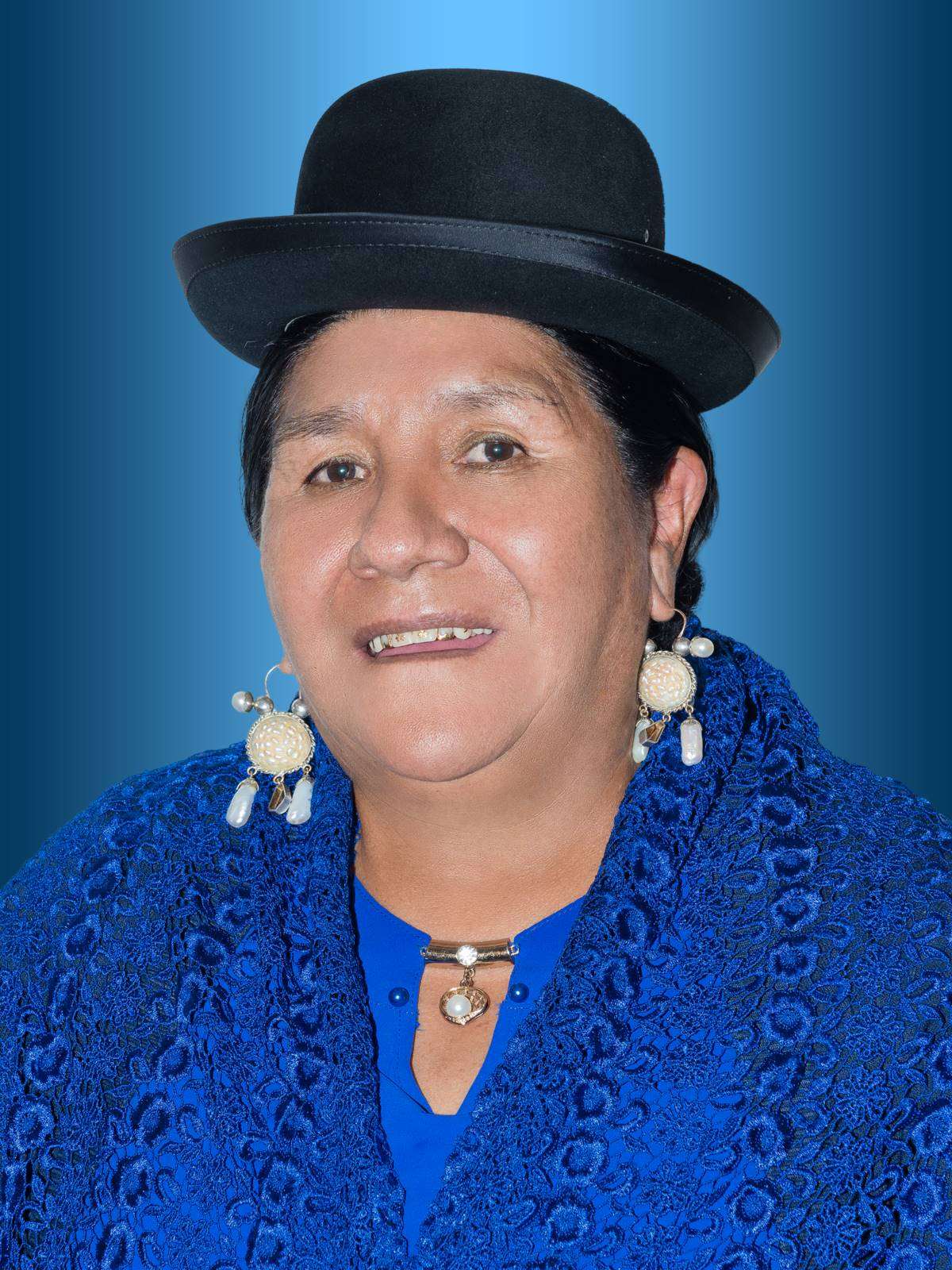
- Fluent in both Spanish and Aymara, Alanoca made use of both languages in her campaign. A significant majority of El Alto identifies as Aymara and a large proportion are bilingual.
- 2019 Aymara-language campaign ad
- 2019 Spanish-language campaign ad

Through her affiliation with the MAS, Alanoca spent a brief stint in parliament as a substitute for Wilfredo Calani from 2010 to 2015. Absent from the 2014 ballot, she returned to contest circumscription 10 in the Chamber of Deputies in the 2019 election as a representative of the guild sector, a constituency for whom the MAS commonly reserved a substantive quota on its parliamentary lists. She won her race,^{[§]} but the wider election results – mired in allegations of fraud – were annulled. In the unrest that followed – much of which centered in El Alto – Alanoca played an active role in pro-government mobilizations and was among the protesters who occupied El Alto International Airport to deny opposition leader Luis Fernando Camacho entry into La Paz.

Re-nominated in 2020, Alanoca's campaign hit a new stumbling block late into the race after the Supreme Electoral Tribunal disqualified her candidacy amid complaints that she was not a resident of the constituency she was running in. (Note: According to El Alteño, unofficial reports indicated that Alanoca lived and voted in circumscription 11 and that she had an address in circumscription 12.) Nevertheless, Alanoca was restored to the ballot on appeal, and she ultimately won the race in a landslide, accompanying a general citywide MAS sweep.^{[§]}

=== Tenure ===
Alanoca identifies with the evista wing of her party within the majority MAS caucus: the bench of legislators closest aligned with former president and party leader Evo Morales – as opposed to a newer group affiliated with incumbent Luis Arce. Although largely ideologically aligned, a growing schism over conflicting factional loyalties led many in the evista wing to act in increased opposition to the Arce administration.

For her part, Alanoca was a vocal critic of those outside her camp and was no stranger to public spats with colleagues she considered "traitor[s]" to the party – even as her own substitute, Zacarías Laura, aligned himself with the arcistas. Alanoca voted in favor of censuring Arce's justice minister, Iván Lima, and was one of thirty-two MAS legislators who aligned with the opposition to censure Government Minister Eduardo del Castillo. Arce's move to re-appoint del Castillo after his ouster by parliament led Alanoca to call for the president's impeachment.

In legislation, Alanoca backed social policy in favor of the elderly and disenfranchised youth. Between 2020 and 2022, she presented three bills proposing expanded access to finance for senior citizens living in poor health or extreme poverty; the creation of state-sponsored scholarships for children and adolescents orphaned during the COVID-19 pandemic; and the establishment of a national sex offender registry accessible by the public.

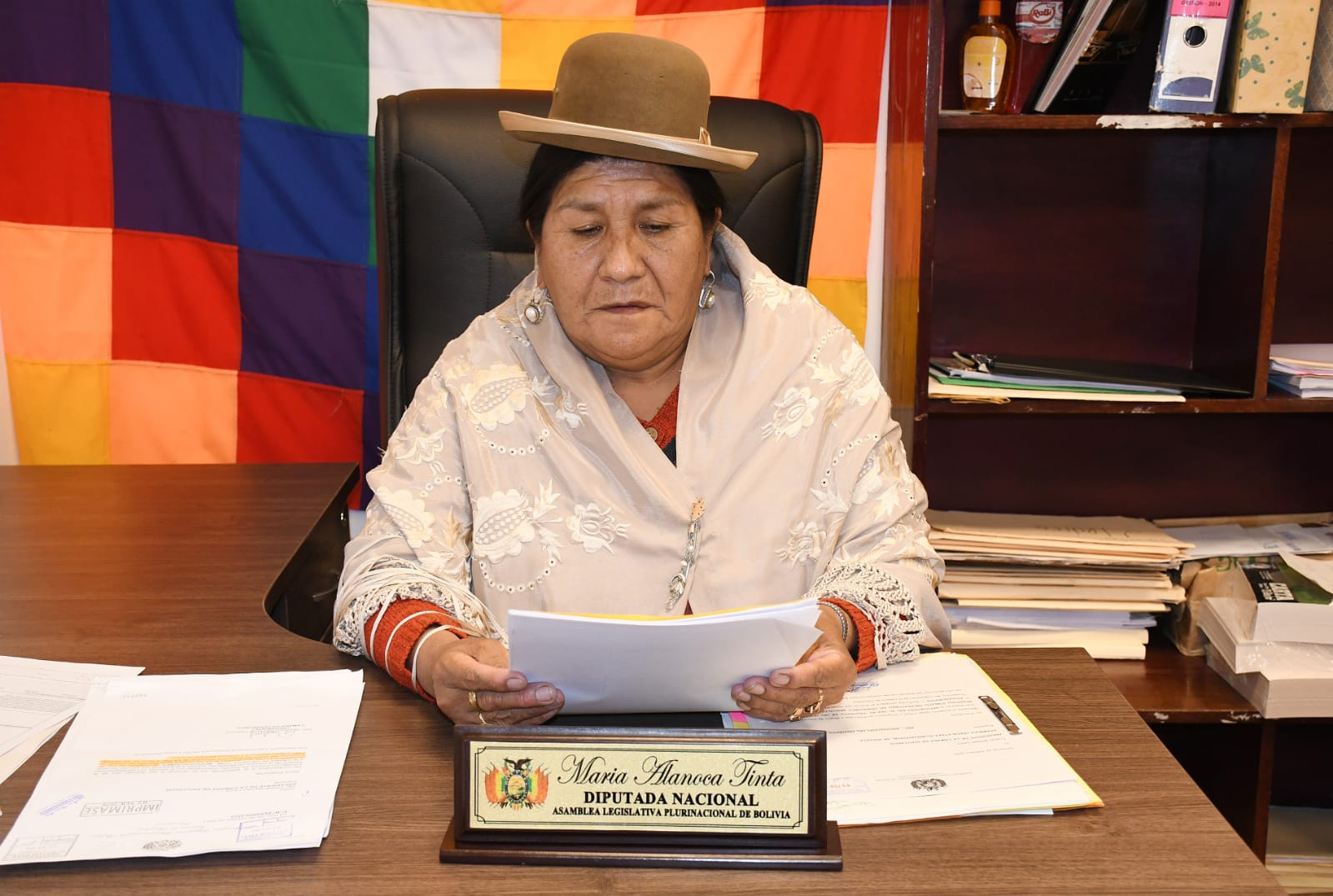
Alanoca at her office, 14 February 2022.

=== Commission assignments ===
- Territorial Organization of the State and Autonomies Commission
  - Departmental Autonomies Committee (Secretary: 2021–2022)
  - Rural Native Indigenous Autonomies Committee (2022–present)
- Social Policy Commission
  - Social Welfare and Protection Committee (2020–2021)

== Electoral history ==
Electoral history of María Alanoca
Year	Office	Party	Votes			Result	Ref.
Year	Office	Party	Total	%	P.	Result	Ref.
2009	Substitute deputy	Movement for Socialism	1,099,259	80.28%	1st	Won	(Note: Presented on an electoral list. The data shown represents the share of the vote the entire party/alliance received in that constituency.)
2019	Deputy	Movement for Socialism	67,423	51.7%	1st	Annulled	
2020	Deputy	Movement for Socialism	108,967	75.68%	1st	Won	
Source: Plurinational Electoral Organ | Electoral Atlas

Chamber of Deputies of Bolivia
Preceded by Santusa Calizaya	Substitute Member of the Chamber of Deputies from La Paz; 2010–2015	Succeeded by Lidia Patty
Preceded by Saturnino Quispe	Member of the Chamber of Deputies from La Paz circumscription 10; 2020–present	Incumbent
