= K'usilluni =

Mountain in Bolivia

- Location within Bolivia

Highest point
- Elevation: 4,600 m (15,100 ft)
- Coordinates: 14°58′27″S 68°55′56″W

Geography
- Location: Bolivia, La Paz Department
- Parent range: Andes, Apolobamba

K'usilluni (Aymara k'usillu monkey, -ni a suffix to indicate ownership, "the one with a monkey (or monkeys)", also spelled Kusilluni) is a mountain in the eastern extensions of the Apolobamba mountain range in Bolivia, about 4,600 metres (15,092 ft) high. It is situated in the La Paz Department, Bautista Saavedra Province, Curva Municipality. K'usilluni lies northeast of the mountain Qutañani.
