= Ch'uxña Quta (Curva) =

Lake in Bolivia

- Location within Bolivia Location within South America
- Interactive map of Ch'uxña Quta
- Location: Bolivia, La Paz Department, Bautista Saavedra Province, Curva Municipality
- Coordinates: 15°00′51″S 69°05′27″W
- Surface elevation: 5,543 m (18,186 ft)

Ch'uxña Quta (Aymara ch'uxña green, quta lake, "green lake", hispanicized spelling Chojna Kkota, Choiña Kkota) is a lake in the Apolobamba mountain range of Bolivia situated in the La Paz Department, Bautista Saavedra Province, Curva Municipality, Calaya Canton. It lies about 5,543 metres (18,186 ft) above sea level, 4 km northwest of the mountain Iskillani (Isquillani).

Ch'uxña Quta gets waters from the mountain Ulla Qhaya east of it. This stream named Q'añuma Jawira ("dirty water river", Cañuma Jahuira, Cunuma Jahuira) also connects Ch'uxña Quta with the larger lake Janq'u Qala in the southwest. Afterwards it flows to Such'i River.

== See also ==
- Apolobamba Integrated Management Natural Area
