= Qutañani =

Mountain in Bolivia

- Location within Bolivia

Highest point
- Elevation: 4,900 m (16,100 ft)
- Coordinates: 14°59′11″S 68°56′44″W

Geography
- Location: Bolivia, La Paz Department
- Parent range: Andes, Apolobamba

Qutañani (Aymara qutaña dam, -ni a suffix to indicate ownership, "the one with a dam", also spelled Cotanani) is a mountain in the eastern extensions of the Apolobamba mountain range in Bolivia, about 4,900 metres (16,076 ft) high. It is situated in the La Paz Department, Bautista Saavedra Province, Curva Municipality. Qutañani lies southwest of K'usilluni.
