= Kunturini (Bolivia) =

Mountain in Bolivia

- Location within Bolivia

Highest point
- Elevation: 4,200 m (13,800 ft)
- Coordinates: 15°03′53″S 68°56′06″W

Geography
- Location: Bolivia, La Paz Department
- Parent range: Andes

Kunturini (Aymara kunturi condor, -ni a suffix to indicate ownership, "the one with a condor", also spelled Condorini) is a mountain east of the Apolobamba mountain range in Bolivia, about 4,200 metres (13,780 ft) high. It is situated in the La Paz Department, Bautista Saavedra Province, Curva Municipality.
