= Curva Municipality =

- Municipality
- Flag

- Location within Bolivia
- Coordinates: 15°1′S 68°57′W
- Country: Bolivia
- Department: La Paz Department
- Province: Bautista Saavedra Province
- Seat: Curva

Population (2001)
  - Total: 2,213
- Time zone: UTC-4 (BOT)

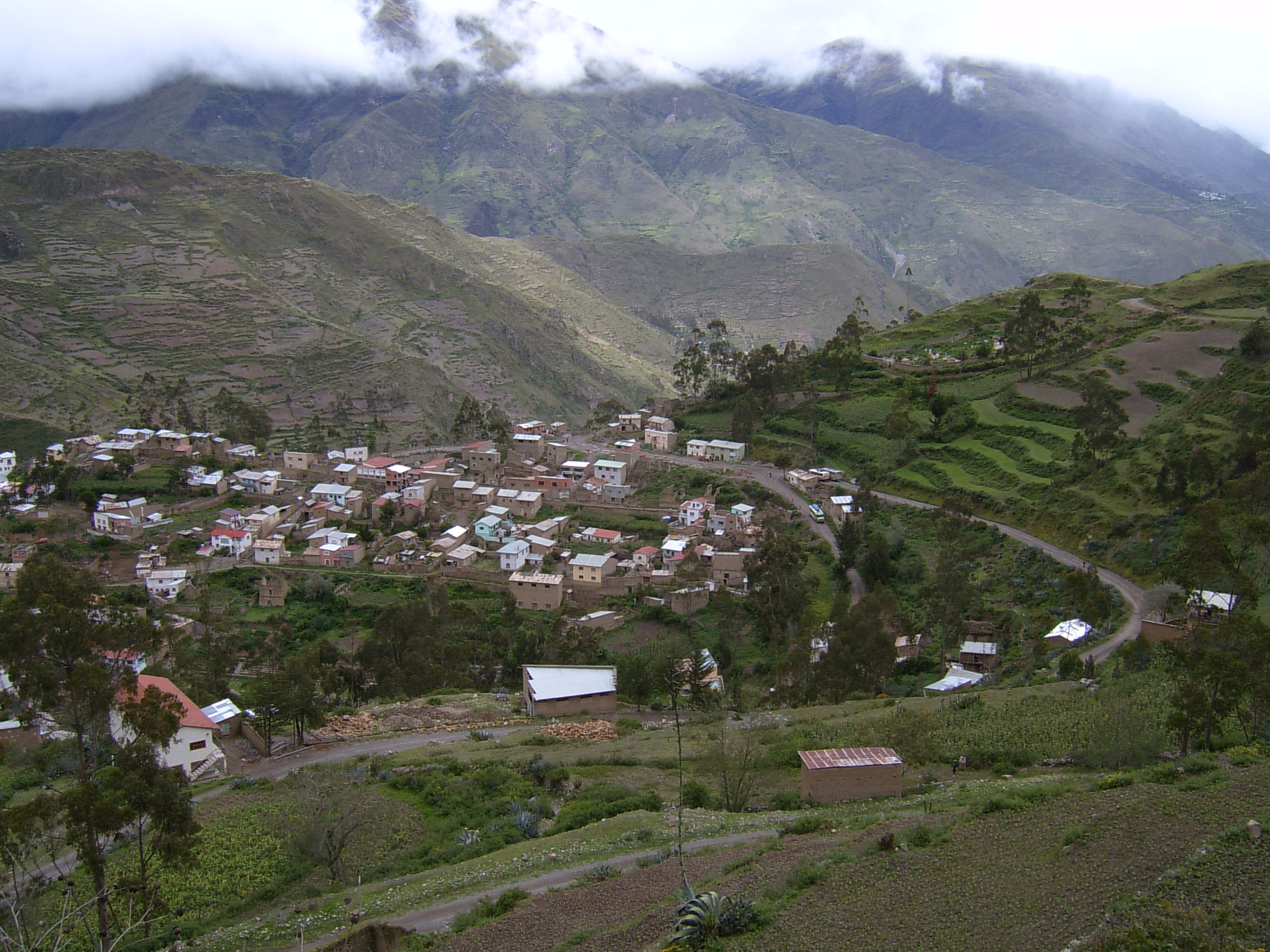

Curva Municipality is the second municipal section of the Bautista Saavedra Province in the La Paz Department, Bolivia. Its seat is Curva.

== See also ==
- Ch'uxña Quta
- Kunturini
- K'usilluni
- Qillwa Quta
- Qutañani
- Supay Punku
- Ulla Qhaya
- Wila Kunka
