= Ulla Qhaya =

Mountain in Bolivia

- Pupuya
- Location within Bolivia

Highest point
- Elevation: 5,617 m (18,428 ft)
- Coordinates: 15°00′41″S 69°02′32″W

Geography
- Location: Bolivia, La Paz Department, Franz Tamayo Province, Pelechuco Municipality
- Parent range: Andes, Apolobamba

Ulla Qhaya (Aymara ulla cooked potato, qhaya store of potatoes, also spelled Ulla Khaya, Ullakaya), Jila Khayo, Huelancalloc, Huellancalloc or Pupuya is a 5,617-metre-high (18,428 ft) mountain in the Apolobamba mountain range in Bolivia. It is situated in the La Paz Department at the border of the Bautista Saavedra Province, Curva Municipality, and the Franz Tamayo Province, Pelechuco Municipality. Ulla Qhaya lies east of the lake Ch'uxña Quta and the northwestern side of the mountain Iskillani.
