= Bautista Saavedra Province =

Bautista Saavedra
- Province
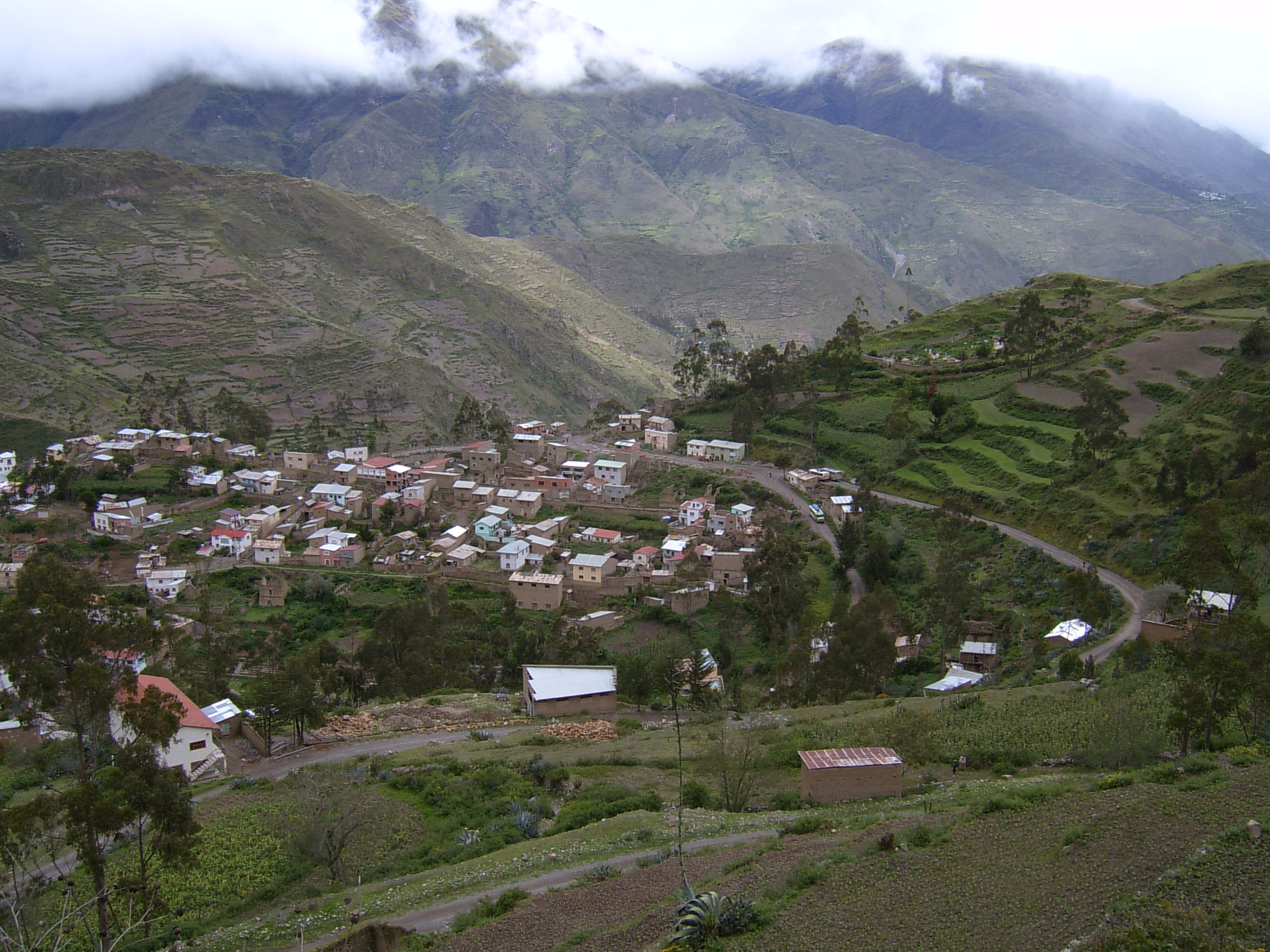
- Charazani

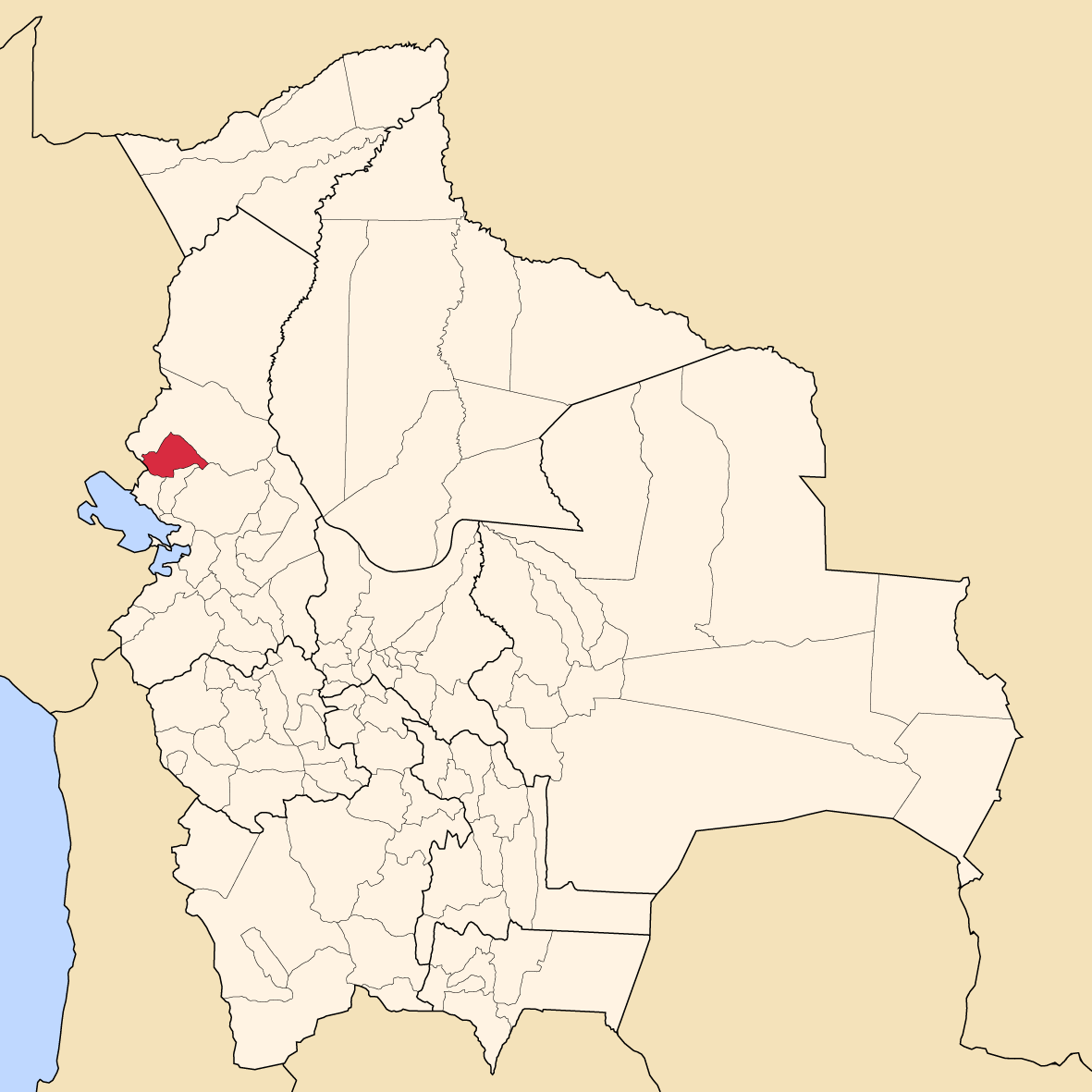
- Location of Bautista Saavedra Province within Bolivia

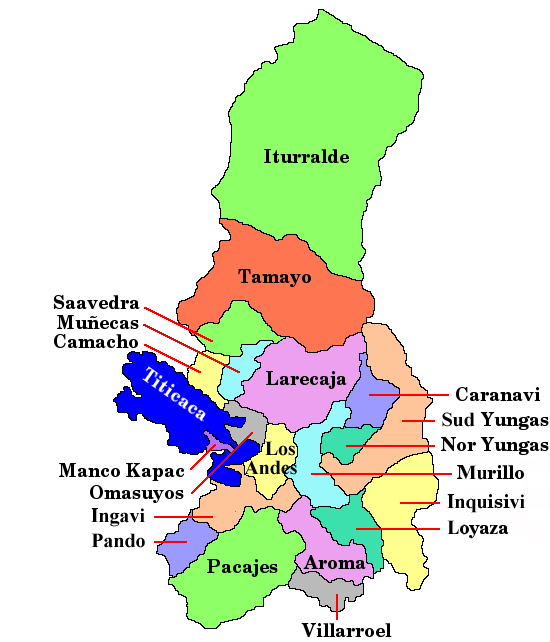
- Provinces of the La Paz Department
- Coordinates: 15°0′0″S 68°45′0″W
- Country: Bolivia
- Department: La Paz Department
- Municipalities: 2
- Founded: November 17, 1948
- Capital: Achacachi

Area
  - Total: 2,525 km^{2} (975 sq mi)

Population (2024 census)
  - Total: 22,277
  - Density: 8.823/km^{2} (22.85/sq mi)
  - Ethnicities: Quechua Aymara
- Time zone: UTC-4 (BOT)
- Website: Official website

Bautista Saavedra is one of the twenty provinces of the Bolivian La Paz Department situated in the northwestern parts of the department. It was created on November 17, 1948 in honor of Bautista Saavedra Mallea (1870-1939) who was Bolivia's president from 1920 to 1925. The capital of the province is Charazani.

The region is famous for the Kallawaya culture with its traditional medicine practices which was declared a Masterpiece of the Oral and Intangible Patrimony of the Humanity by the UNESCO on November 7, 2003.

== Location ==
Bautista Saavedra Province is located between 14° 45' and 15° 20' South and between 68° 18' and 69° 12' West. It extends over 65 km from north to south, and up to 90 km from west to east.

The province is situated on the Bolivian Altiplano northeast of Lake Titicaca and borders Franz Tamayo Province in the northeast to northwest, Peru in the west, Eliodoro Camacho Province in the southwest, and Muñecas Province and Larecaja Province in the southeast. Madidi National Park is partially in this province.

== Geography ==
The Apolobamba mountain range traverses the province. Some of the highest mountains of the province are listed below:

- Kunturini
- K'usilluni
- Qutañani
- Supay Punku
- Ulla Qhaya
- Wila Kunka

== Population ==
The population of Bautista Saavedra Province has increased by 30% over the recent two decades:

- 1992: 9,995 inhabitants (census)
- 2001: 11,475 inhabitants (census)
- 2005: 12,437 inhabitants (est.)
- 2010: 12,851 inhabitants (est.)

41.3% of the population are younger than 15 years old. (1992)

46.6% of the population speak Spanish, 89.3% speak Quechua, and 36.1% Aymara. (2001)

The literacy rate of the province's population is 55.2%. (1992)

94.3% of the population have no access to electricity, 93.3% have no sanitary facilities. (1992)

89.1% of the population are Catholics, 5.7% are Protestants. (1992)

== Division ==
The province comprises two municipalities:

- General Juan José Pérez Municipality or Charazani Municipality - 9,841 inhabitants (est. 2005)
- Curva Municipality - 2,596 inhabitants (est. 2005)

== See also ==
- Apolobamba Integrated Management Natural Area
- Ch'uxña Quta (Charasani)
- Ch'uxña Quta (Curva)
- Qachu Quta
- Qillwa Quta
