= Candoshi-Shapra language =

Language isolate spoken in Peru

Candoshi-Shapra
- Kandozi-Chapra
- Kadoazi koko
- Native to: Peru
- Ethnicity: 3,000 (2007)
- Native speakers: 1,120 (2007)
- Language family: Chirino–Candoshi: Candoshi-Shapra
- Dialects: Kandoashi; Chapara

Official status
- Official language in: Peru

Language codes
- ISO 639-3: cbu
- Glottolog: cand1248
- ELP: Candoshi
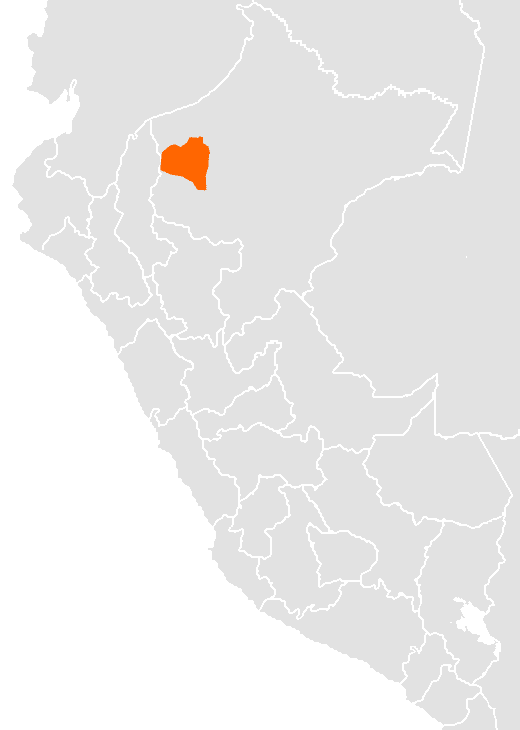

Candoshi-Shapra (also known as Candoshi, Candoxi, Kandoshi, Kandozi-Chapra, and Murato) is an indigenous American language isolate, spoken by several thousand people in western South America along the Chapuli, Huitoyacu, Pastaza, and Morona river valleys. There are two dialects, Chapara (also spelled Shapra) and Kandoashi (Kandozi). It is an official language of Peru, like other native languages in the areas in which they are spoken and are the predominant language in use. Around 88.5 percent of the speakers are bilingual with Spanish. The literacy rate in Candoshi-Shapra is 10 to 30 percent and 15 to 25 percent in the second language Spanish. There is a Candoshi-Shapra dictionary, and grammar rules have been codified.

== Distribution ==
Kandozi is spoken to the southeast of the main Chapra area. It is spoken along the Chapuli River (or Chapuri River) and sources of Rimachi Lake, the Huitoyacu River, and other tributaries of the Pastaza River. Chapra is spoken along the Pushaga River, as well as other tributaries of the Morona River.

== Classification ==
Candoshi is not closely related to any living language. It is apparently related to the extinct and poorly attested language Chirino. Four words of Chirino are mentioned in Relación de la tierra de Jaén (1586), and they resemble words in modern Candoshi. A somewhat longer list of words is given in the same document for Rabona, across the modern border in Ecuador and include some names of plants that resemble Candoshi, but such words can easily be borrowed.

Among modern languages, Loukotka (1968), followed by Tovar (1984), connected Candoshi with Taushiro (Pinche). Kaufman (1994) tentatively proposed a Kandoshi–Omurano–Taushiro language family, with Candoshi the most distant of the trio. However, Kaufman (2007) placed Omurano and Taushiro but not Candoshi in Saparo–Yawan.

David Payne proposes that Candoshi is related to Jivaroan, which he calls Shuar. Together, Shuar and Candoshi make up a putative Shuar-Candoshi family, for which Payne provides a tentative reconstruction of Proto-Shuar-Candoshi.

Jolkesky (2016) classifies Candoshi-Shapra as a Macro-Arawakan language.

== Phonology ==
=== Vowels ===
| | Front | | Back | |
| | short | long | short | long |
|---|---|---|---|---|
| High | i | iː | ʊ | uː |
| Mid | | eː ~ je | | oː ~ wo |
| Low | | | ɑ | ɑː |

Glides /j/ and /w/ alternate with /i/ and /u/ prevocalically.

Nasal vowels only occur in -hã, used to form rhetorical questions.

=== Consonants ===
| | | Labial | Alveolar | Retroflex | Palatal | Velar | Glottal |
|---|---|---|---|---|---|---|---|
| Nasal | | m | n | | | | |
| Plosive | voiceless | p | t | | | k | ʔ |
| Plosive | prenasal | ᵐp | ⁿt | | | ᵑk | |
| Affricate | voiceless | | t͡s | t͡ʂ | t͡ʃ | | |
| Affricate | prenasal | | ⁿt͡s | ᶯt͡ʂ | ᶮt͡ʃ | | |
| Fricative | | | s | ʂ | ʃ | | h |
| Approximant | | w | | | j | | |
| Tap | | | ɾ | | | | |

/w/ can be heard as a fricative [β] when preceding /i/ in the Chapuli and Chapra dialects.

Prenasalized /ᵐp, ⁿt, ⁿt͡s, ᶯt͡ʂ, ᶮt͡ʃ, ᵑk/ can be voiced as [ᵐb, ⁿd, ⁿd͡z, ᶯd͡ʐ, ᶮd͡ʒ, ᵑɡ]. In addition, /ᵐp, ⁿt, ᵑk/ are also typically voiced as [ᵐb, ⁿd, ᵑɡ] in intervocalic positions.

== Language contact ==
Jolkesky (2016) notes that there are lexical similarities with the Hibito-Cholon, Jivaroan, Cahuapanan, Quechua, Kunza, Mochica, and Panoan language families due to contact.

== Sources ==
- Payne, David Lawrence (1981). "Bosquejo fonológico del Proto-Shuar-Candoshi: evidencias para una relación genética". Revista del Museo Nacional. 45. Lima, Perú: Órgano del museo nacional de la cultura peruana: 323–377.
