= Muniche language =

Extinct language of Peru

Muniche
- Munichi, Balsapuertiño
- Native to: Peru
- Region: Loreto
- Extinct: late 1990s, with the death of Victoria Huancho Icahuate; 1-2 semispeakers (2023)
- Language family: Language isolate
- Dialects: see below
- Writing system: Latin

Language codes
- ISO 639-3: myr
- Glottolog: muni1258
- ELP: Munichi
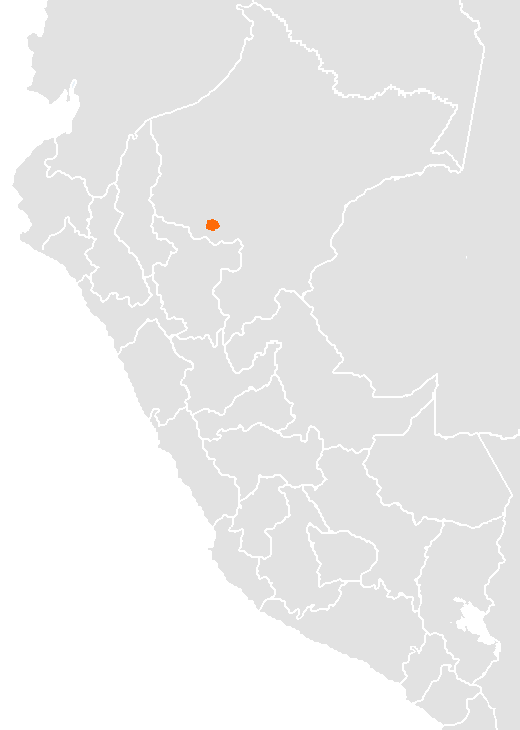
- Location of Munichi

Muniche is an extinct language which was spoken in the village of Munichis, about 10 miles (16 km) west of Yurimaguas, Loreto Region, Peru. The last known fluent speaker, Victoria Huancho Icahuate, died in the late 1990s, but the language was already moribund by the 1930s. As of 2009, there were several semi-speakers who retained significant lexical, and partial grammatical, knowledge of the language.

It is also called Balsapuertiño, named after the village of Balsapuerto in the department of Loreto, Peru.

Word order in Muniche is VSO.

== Classification ==
The language is considered an isolate (Michael et al. 2013), but the pronominal suffixes bear a close resemblance to those reconstructed for proto-Arawakan (Gibson 1996:18-19), and some lexical items are similar to ones in Arawakan languages (Jolkesky 2016:310–317). Although Jolkesky (id.) argues that the language belongs to a putative Macro-Arawakan stock, evidence has yet to be provided for placing it either in a sister branch to the Arawakan language family or in a branch within this language family. There is substantial borrowing from the local variety of Quechua, and to a lesser extent from Spanish and Cahuapanan languages (Michael et al. 2013).

== Varieties ==
Currently, there are two distinguished varieties of Muniche. One of the dialects merges certain phonemes that the other dialect does not.

== Language contact ==
Jolkesky (2016) notes that there are lexical similarities with the Cholon-Hibito, Quechua, and Mochika language families due to contact.

A number of Spanish loanwords may have passed through Shiwilu, a Cahuapanan language.

== Phonology ==
=== Vowels ===
Munichi has six vowels: /a, e, i, ɨ, o, u/. Michael et al. (2023) reduce this to five vowels, these being /i, ɨ, u, e, a/.

=== Consonants ===
Consonants
		Bilabial	Alveolar	Palato-alveolar	Retroflex	Palatal	Velar	Glottal
Stop	voiceless	p	t			c	k	ʔ
Stop	voiced		d				g	
Affricate			t͡s	t͡ʃ^{2}	ʈʂ			
Fricative			s	ʃ	ʂ	ç		h^{3}
Nasal		m	n^{1}			ɲ^{1}		
Approximant			l			j	(w)	
Flap			ɾ					

1. The two nasals listed here are treated as one placeless nasal by Michael et al. (2023). It assimilates to the position of the following stop or affricate; otherwise it is realized as [n] in onsets and [ŋ] in codas. This may be seen in the following examples:

iN-pa
[iʔmpa]
peach.palm-CLF:mash
'peach palm mash'

iN-sa
[iʔŋsa]
peach.palm-CLF:fluid
'peach palm drink'

[m] does not exhibit this assimilation.

hamte-ɲe
[hamteɲe]
child-1SG
'my child'

1. [t͡ʃ] and [ʈʂ] lose their contrast before /i/, /e/, and /ɨ/, with only [t͡ʃ] occurring before /i/ and /e/, and [ʈʂ] before /ɨ/.
2. /h/ becomes [x] immediately before other consonants.

=== Phonotactics ===
The maximal syllable in Muniche is C_{1}C_{2}VC_{3}, with the following restrictions for the consonants. Syllables without onset are permitted.

1. C_{1} must be voiceless.
2. C_{2} cannot be a fricative.
3. C_{1} and C_{2} cannot be a glottal stop.
4. C_{1} and C_{2} cannot be both fricatives or both affricates.

Many consonant clusters in Muniche are suspected to arise from vowel reduction.

== Verbs ==
=== Desiderative ===
Muniche has a desiderative suffix -çu ~ -cu, used to express that the subject of a verb to which the suffix is attached desires the outcome of the clause.

ʂa-çu-me=ɲe iʔteʔsira maçu
eat-DESI-PFV=1SG soup deer
'I want to eat deer soup'

çawɨ-çu=nɨ raneʔe
sit-DESI-1SG there
'I want to sit there'

The subject must be the one desiring the realization of an action and the realizer of the action. To express the desire of someone else realizing an action, the complement-taking verb açta must be used.

açta-me=ɲe sica-t=pɨ=nɨ puʔu ʂnɨrɨ
want-PFV-1SG sell-IRR=2SG=1SG meat paca
'I want you to sell me paca meat'

== See also ==
- Kichwa-Lamista people

== Bibliography ==
- Gibson, Michael Luke (1996). El Munichi: Un idioma que se extingue. Serie Lingüística Peruana. Vol. 42 (1 ed.). Pucallpa: Instituto Lingüístico de Verano.
- Jolkesky, Marcelo Pinho De Valhery (2017-01-01). Estudo arqueo-ecolinguístico das terras tropicais Sul-Americanas [An Archaeo-Ecolinguistic Study of the South American Tropics] (PhD thesis) (2nd ed.). Brasilia: UnB. doi:10.26512/2016.02.T.21671.
- Michael, Lev; Farmer, Stephanie; Finley, Gregory; Beier, Christine; Acosta, Karina Sullón (July 2013). "A Sketch of Muniche Segmental and Prosodic Phonology". International Journal of American Linguistics. 79 (3): 307–347. doi:10.1086/670752. ISSN 0020-7071.
- Michael, L.; Beier, Ch.; Acosta, K. S.; Farmer, S.; Finley, G.; Roswell, M. (2009). Dekyunáwa: Un diccionario de nuestro idioma muniche (PDF). (Manuscript).
