= Charazani =

Charazani Charasani
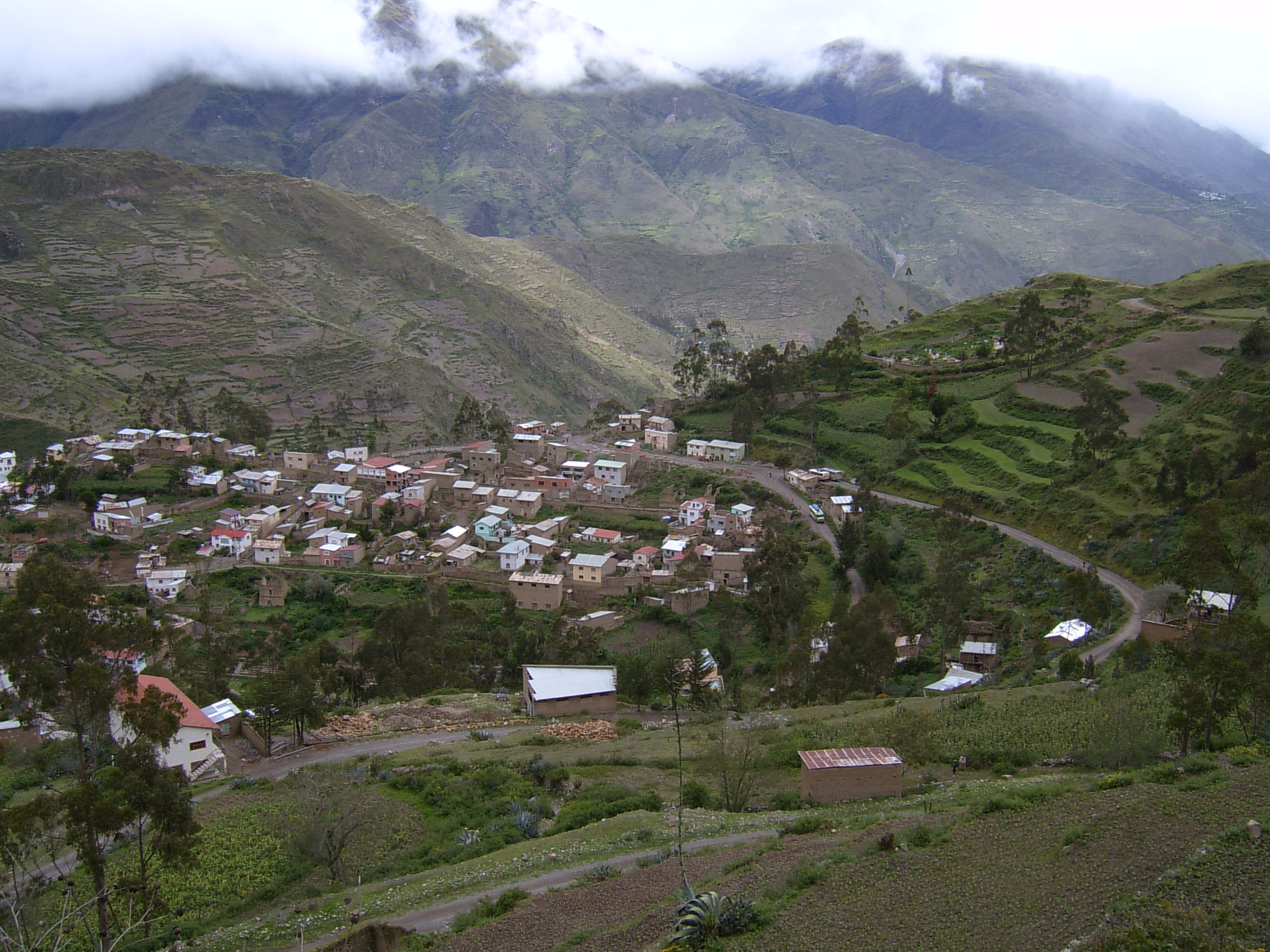
- Charazani

- Location in Bolivia
- Coordinates: 15°10′38″S 68°59′18″W
- Country: Bolivia
- Department: La Paz Department
- Province: Bautista Saavedra Province
- Elevation: 10,500 ft (3,200 m)

Population (2001)census
  - Total: 501
- Time zone: UTC-4 (BOT)
- Climate: Cwb

Charazani or Charasani is a small town in the South American Andes in Bolivia.

== Location ==
Charazani is the capital of Bautista Saavedra Province and central town of the municipality. It is situated on a spur at an elevation of 3,200 m amsl between Cordillera Muñecas in the south and Cordillera Apolabamba in the north, on a Mapiri River tributary which itself flows towards Beni River.

== Infrastructure ==
Charazani is located 254 km north-west of La Paz, the capital of La Paz Department. From La Paz, the asphaltic highway Ruta 2 goes 70 km north-west to Huarina, where the asphaltic Ruta 16 branches south-west for another 97 km along Lake Titicaca till Escoma. From Escoma a dirt road goes north and reaches Charazani after 87 km.

The weekly village market attracts vendors and visitors from a wide area. The market makes Charazani economically the most significant locality in the Charazani valley.

== Population ==
The population of Charazani has risen by 20% in the recent decade, from 501 inhabitants (2001 census) to 604 inhabitants (2008 est.). Currently, La Paz's Gobernación shows that Charazani has 11 761 inhabitants in the whole municipality. Most inhabitants of the Charazani municipality live in poverty: 91,5% of the municipality are unable to suffice their basic needs.

It boasts of a population that speaks Quechua, which is also learned at school. About 76.5% of the municipality speak Quechua as a primary language followed by Aymara speakers, 13%.

Charazani is a major locality for the Kallawaya, a UNESCO Intangible Cultural Heritage culture of ritualistic healers.

== Climate ==
Climate data for Charazani
Month	Jan	Feb	Mar	Apr	May	Jun	Jul	Aug	Sep	Oct	Nov	Dec	Year
Mean daily maximum °C (°F)	18.1 (64.6)	18.0 (64.4)	18.2 (64.8)	18.6 (65.5)	17.9 (64.2)	18.1 (64.6)	18.3 (64.9)	19.3 (66.7)	19.3 (66.7)	19.7 (67.5)	20.0 (68.0)	18.7 (65.7)	18.7 (65.6)
Mean daily minimum °C (°F)	8.3 (46.9)	8.6 (47.5)	8.4 (47.1)	6.8 (44.2)	4.6 (40.3)	2.9 (37.2)	3.6 (38.5)	4.5 (40.1)	6.1 (43.0)	7.3 (45.1)	7.9 (46.2)	8.5 (47.3)	6.5 (43.6)
Average precipitation mm (inches)	76 (3.0)	72 (2.8)	50 (2.0)	31 (1.2)	13 (0.5)	9 (0.4)	8 (0.3)	10 (0.4)	26 (1.0)	29 (1.1)	30 (1.2)	45 (1.8)	399 (15.7)
Source 1: Dirección General de Riego Vice Ministerio de Desarrollo Rural y Riego
Source 2: National Meteorology and Hydrology Service of Peru (precipitation)
