= Janq'u Uma (Peru) =

Mountain in Peru

- Location within Peru

Highest point
- Elevation: 4,900 m (16,100 ft)
- Coordinates: 14°34′08″S 69°27′47″W

Geography
- Location: Peru
- Parent range: Andes, Apolobamba

Janq'u Uma (Aymara janq'u white, uma water, "white water", also spelled Ccancouma, Janjouma) is a mountain in the north of the Apolobamba mountain range in the Andes of Peru, about 4,900 metres (16,076 ft) high. It is located in the Puno Region, Sandia Province, Cuyocuyo District. Janq'u Uma lies northwest of the mountain Wilaquta, northeast of Qurwari and southwest of Utkhuqaqa. Two little streams named Janq'u Uma (Janjouma) and Qullqipirwa (Jolljepirhua) originate west and east of the mountain. They flow to the river Lawa Lawani which runs to the north. It belongs to the watershed of the Inambari River.

== See also ==
- Liqiliqini
