= Qaqa Wasi =

Mountain in Peru

- Location within Peru

Highest point
- Elevation: 4,800 m (15,700 ft)
- Coordinates: 14°21′03″S 69°42′57″W

Geography
- Location: Peru
- Parent range: Andes

Qaqa Wasi or Qaqawasi (Quechua qaqa rock, wasi house, "rock house", Hispanicized spelling Jajahuasi) is a mountain in the Andes of Peru, about 4,800 metres (15,748 ft) high. It is located in the Puno Region, Sandia Province, Patambuco District. It lies northeast of the mountain Rit'ikunka. South of Qaqa Wasi there is a group of small lakes, among them Rit'iqucha ("snow lake", Riticocha) and Yanaqucha ("black lake", Yanacocha). The lake Quchak'uchu is situated in the Rit'ipata valley southeast of the mountain.
