= Utkhuqaqa =

Mountain in Peru

- Location within Peru

Highest point
- Elevation: 5,049 m (16,565 ft)
- Coordinates: 14°33′21″S 69°27′29″W

Geography
- Location: Peru
- Parent range: Andes, Apolobamba

Utkhuqaqa or Utkhu Qaqa (Quechua utkhu cotton, qaqa rock, "cotton rock", also spelled Utccuccacca, Utjujanja) is a 5,049-metre-high (16,565 ft) mountain in the Apolobamba mountain range in the Andes of Peru. It is located in the Puno Region, Sandia Province, Cuyocuyo District. It lies northwest of the mountain Wilaquta and northeast of Qurwari and Janq'u Uma. Little streams named Qullqipirwa (Jolljepirhua), Janq'u Uma (Janjouma) and Utkhuqaqa (Utjujaja) flow along its slopes. They are the origin of the river Lawa Lawani which runs to the north. It belongs to the watershed of the Inambari River.

== See also ==
- Liqiliqini
