= Qachini =

Mountain in Peru

- Tara Paka
- Location within Peru

Highest point
- Elevation: 5,200 m (17,100 ft)
- Coordinates: 14°37′00″S 69°27′29″W

Geography
- Location: Peru, Puno Region
- Parent range: Andes, Apolobamba

Qachini (Aymara qachi a corral where sheep is separated or cured, -ni a suffix to indicate ownership, 'the one with a corral for sheep', also spelled Ccachine, Jachini) or Tara Paka (Aymara for "two-headed eagle", Quechua for Andean eagle, Hispanicized spelling Tarapacá) is a mountain in the north of the Apolobamba mountain range in the Andes of Peru, about 5,200 metres (17,060 ft) high. It is located in the Puno Region, Putina Province, Ananea District, northwest of La Rinconada. Qachini lies southwest of the mountain named Wilaquta, northeast of Qala K'umu and southeast of Qurwari.
