= Qala K'umu =

Mountain in Peru

- Location within Peru

Highest point
- Elevation: 5,200 m (17,100 ft)
- Coordinates: 14°37′09″S 69°29′29″W

Geography
- Location: Peru, Puno Region
- Parent range: Andes, Apolobamba

Qala K'umu (Aymara qala stone, k'umu hunchback "stone hump", also spelled Ccalacumu, Jalacumu) is a mountain in the north of the Apolobamba mountain range in the Andes of Peru, about 5,200 metres (17,060 ft) high. It is located in the Puno Region, Putina Province, Ananea District, northwest of La Rinconada. Qala K'umu lies southwest of the mountains Wilaquta, Qachini and Qurwari.
