= Puka Pukayuq =

Mountain in Peru

- Location within Peru

Highest point
- Elevation: 4,800 m (15,700 ft)
- Coordinates: 14°12′39″S 69°45′20″W

Geography
- Location: Peru
- Parent range: Andes

Puka Pukayuq (Quechua puka red, the reduplication indicates that there is a group or a complex of something, -yuq a suffix to indicate ownership, "the one with a complex of red color", Hispanicized spelling Pucapucayoc) is a mountain in the Andes of Peru, about 4,800 metres (15,748 ft) high. It is located in the Puno Region, Sandia Province, Limbani District It lies northeast of the peaks of Ariquma, Ankayuq K'uchu and Wirta Pata, and north of a lake named Ch'uxñaquta ("green lake", Chocñecota).
