= Taypi Kunka =

Mountain in Peru

- Location within Peru

Highest point
- Elevation: 4,800 m (15,700 ft)
- Coordinates: 14°16′37″S 69°49′38″W

Geography
- Location: Peru
- Parent range: Andes

Taypi Kunka (Aymara taypi center, middle, kunka throat, throat, gullet, neck, "central throat", Hispanicized spelling Taypicunca) is a mountain in the Andes of Peru, about 4,800-metre (15,700 ft) high. It is located in the Puno Region, Carabaya Province, Crucero District. Taypi Kunka lies at a lake named Wiluyuq Qucha, northwest of Apachita and northeast of Pinkilluni Urqu.
