= Hatun Pinkilluni (Sandia) =

Mountain in Peru

- Location within Peru

Highest point
- Elevation: 5,000 m (16,000 ft)
- Coordinates: 14°19′21″S 69°42′29″W

Geography
- Location: Peru
- Parent range: Andes

Hatun Pinkilluni (Quechua hatun big, pinkillu a kind of flute, Aymara -ni a suffix to indicate ownership, "the one with a big pinkillu" or "the big one with a pinkillu", Hispanicized spelling Jatun Pinquillone) is a mountain in the Andes of Peru, about 5,000 metres (16,404 ft) high. It is located in the Puno Region, Sandia Province, Patambuco District. It lies southwest of the mountain Pinkilluni and northeast of Rit'ikunka and Q'alawaña. The ridge northeast of the mountain is named Huch'uy Pinkilluni ("little Pinkilluni", Uchuy Pinquillone).
