= Apachita (Puno) =

Mountain in Peru

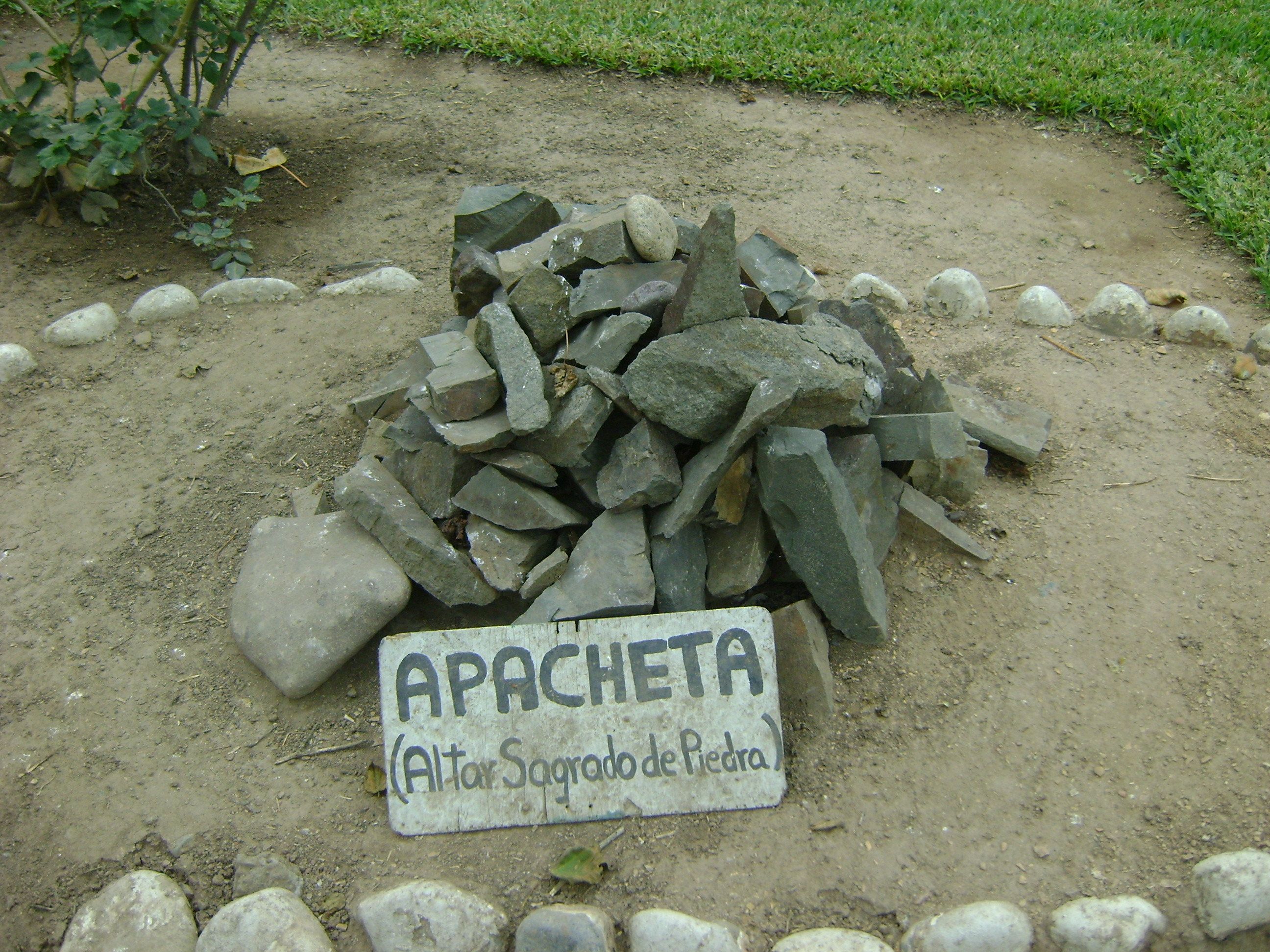
- Apachita at the Lima Botanical Garden

Highest point
- Elevation: 5,168 m (16,955 ft)
- Coordinates: 14°17′05″S 69°48′29″W

Geography
- Location within Peru
- Location: Peru
- Parent range: Andes

Apacheta (Aymara for the place of transit of an important pass in the principal routes of the Andes; name for a stone cairn in the Andes, a little pile of rocks built along the trail in the high mountains, also spelled Apacheta) is a 5,168-metre-high (16,955 ft) mountain in the Andes of Peru. It is located in the Puno Region, Carabaya Province, Crucero District. Apachita lies west of the peaks of Ariquma, north of Ariquma Lake and northeast of Wiluyuq Qucha and the peak of Wiluyuq Urqu.
