= Muñequita Milly =

Peruvian singer (2000–2024)

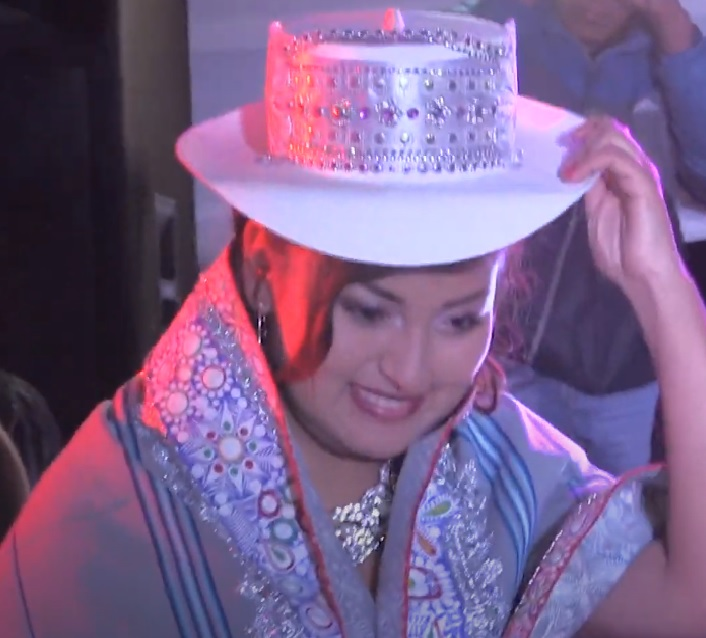

Background information
- Born: Flor Sheiza Quispe Sucapura; 18 December 2000; Yanahuaya, Peru
- Died: 3 April 2024 (aged 23) Miraflores, Peru
- Genres: Huayno; folklore
- Occupations: Singer
- Years active: 2005–2024

Flor Sheiza Quispe Sucapura (18 December 2000 – 3 April 2024), known by her stage name Muñequita Milly, was a Peruvian singer. Spanning from 2005 until her death, she had consolidated her artistic career in vernacular Andean music, in which she enjoyed popularity during the 2010s and 2020s.

== Early life and education ==
Flor Sheiza Quispe Sucapura was born on 18 December 2000 in Yanahuaya, a district in the Sandia Province, Department of Puno. She was the daughter of Jaime Quispe and María Luz Sucapura. She studied at the Yanaguaya School and later at the Miraflores School.

== Career ==
Quispe would show her interest in music from the age of five, in which she participated in an artistic contest in her area, performing songs by the folk singer Fresialinda. Thanks to this, it allowed her to start a musical career under the name Muñequita Milly during the mid-2000s. During her career, she became popular as a performer of the musical songs "Ojitos hechiceros", "Busca de otro amor", "Ahora sufre" (Now suffer), "Quédate con ella" (Stay with her) and "Maldito destino" (Damn destiny), the latter two composed by her brother Oliver Quispe.

During the COVID-19 pandemic, Milly was part of the recording of her new material "No me busques", "Pienso en ti", "Boquita de caramel" and "Mix memorias", achieving resounding success on YouTube. Subsequently, she performed in different concerts in the capital, Lima, and other cities in her country. In 2023, she released her latest single "Mil años", remaining in Peruvian folklore, becoming one of the promising young singers of her genre, in addition to venturing into Peruvian cumbia.

== Death ==
On 27 March 2024, Quispe went to undergo cosmetic surgery at the Santa Catalina Clinic, owned by the Peruvian physician Víctor Barriga Fong. According to Infobae, Fong is known for having worked for different celebrities in the world according to local media, to have their touch-ups done and had some history of botching them. During the day of her medical appointment, Quispe underwent a successful liposculpture, leaving the hospital after losing blood in her body and resting at home. A few days later, Quispe suffered discomfort and was transferred to the Clínica del Inca, located in the Miraflores District, where she was treated in the intensive care unit.

Quispe died on the morning of 3 April, in the same place at the age of twenty-three, due to her medical complications, leaving behind an orphaned son, the result of her romantic relationship with Wilfredo Quispe Gaspar. Before her death, Muñequita Milly performed her last concert in Moquegua in March. After the news of her death, she made waves in the media in her country.

Hours after her death, Fong released a statement declaring that Quispe had not undergone her operation at his clinic, and that none of his surgeons were involved. Quispe's lawyer spoke with Fong about the situation, having had legal advice and was complying with security protocols. Her father Jaime Quispe denounced Fong for the crime of manslaughter due to malpractice after what happened.

Well-known figures of Peruvian music such as Yarita Lizeth, Sonia Morales, Dina Páucar and Fresialinda, offered condolences for the Quispe family. In addition, Quispe was honored by the Ministry of Culture. Quispe's body was transferred to her hometown, where it was laid to rest in her old home.

== Discography ==
=== Studio albums ===
- 2013: Te esperaré bajo la lluvia
- 2014: Vas a llorar
- 2015: Tus engaños
- 2017: Mi único amor
- 2018: Sin piedad me dejaste
- 2019: Olvídate de mi
- 2020: Pienso en ti
- 2020: Comerciante
- 2021: Ya no me hagas llorar
- 2022: Quién toma más que yo
- 2022: Juguete de amor
- 2022: La vida es una sola
- 2023: Quiero ser tu corazón
- 2023: Mil años
