= Qaqinkurani =

Mountain in Peru

- Location within Peru

Highest point
- Elevation: 4,200 m (13,800 ft)
- Coordinates: 14°27′46″S 69°22′14″W

Geography
- Location: Peru
- Parent range: Andes

Qaqinkurani (Aymara qaqinkura wading bird; a South American ibis (Theristicus) -ni a suffix to indicate ownership, "the one with the ibis (or ibises)", also spelled Jajencurani) is a mountain north of the Apolobamba mountain range in the Andes of Peru, about 4,200 metres (13,780 ft) high. It is located in the Puno Region, Sandia Province, Quiaca District, southwest of Quiaca. It lies at the Chuqichampi River.

== See also ==
- K'ayrani
- Liqiliqini
