= Wanakuni (disambiguation) =

Wanakuni is a mountain in the Franz Tamayo Province, La Paz Department, Bolivia.

Wanakuni may also refer to:

- Wanakuni (Cusco), a mountain in the Canchis Province, Cusco Region, Peru
- Wanakuni (Puno), a mountain in the Puno Region, Peru
- Wanakuni (Quispicanchi), a mountain in the Quispicanchi Province, Cusco Region, Peru
- Wanakuni (Sud Yungas), a mountain in the Sud Yungas Province, La Paz Department, Bolivia
