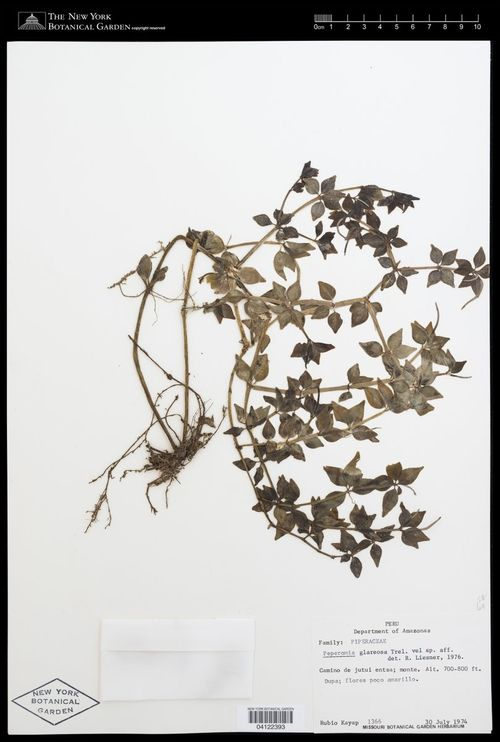

Scientific classification
- Kingdom: Plantae
- Clade: Tracheophytes
- Clade: Angiosperms
- Clade: Magnoliids
- Order: Piperales
- Family: Piperaceae
- Genus: Peperomia
- Species: P. glareosa

Binomial name
- Peperomia glareosa Trel.

= Peperomia glareosa =

Species of epiphyte

Peperomia glareosa is a species of epiphyte in the genus Peperomia that is native to Peru. It grows on wet tropical biomes. Its conservation status is Threatened.

== Description ==
The type specimen were collected near Sandia, Peru.

Peperomia glareosa is a rather large, tufted, ascending herb. The stem is about 1 mm thick, thickening to 4–5 mm near the base, and is sulcate, puberulous, and granular in texture when dry. The leaves are in whorls of 2–4 at the nodes. They are broadly lanceolate, obtuse, with an acute base, and when dry are firm and opaque with a granular underside. They are 3-nerved. Upper leaves are about 1.5 cm long and 1 cm wide, while leaves on sterile branchlets are larger, reaching 3.5 cm long and 1.5 cm wide. The somewhat puberulous-granular petiole is 2–3 mm long. The spikes are terminal and axillary, 55 mm long and 2 mm thick, borne on a 15 mm long, granular peduncle. The berries are ovoid, attenuate into a style, and bear a small cup-like structure, with an apical stigma.

== Taxonomy and naming ==
It was described in 1936 by William Trelease in Publications of the Field Museum of Natural History, Botanical Series 13, from specimens collected by Ynes Mexia. The epithet glareosa is Latin for "gravelly" or "growing on gravel", referring to the habitat where this species was first collected.

== Distribution and habitat ==
It is native to Peru. It grows as a terrestrial or epiphyte and is a herb. It grows on wet tropical biomes.

== Conservation ==
This species is assessed as Threatened, in a preliminary report.
