= Warachani =

Mountain in Peru

- Location within Peru

Highest point
- Elevation: 4,800 m (15,700 ft)
- Coordinates: 14°15′37″S 69°43′10″W

Geography
- Location: Peru
- Parent range: Andes

Warachani (Aymara waracha wooden camp bed, -ni a suffix to indicate ownership, "the one with a wooden camp bed", Hispanicized spelling Huarachani) is a mountain in the Andes of Peru, about 4,800 metres (15,748 ft) high. It is located in the Puno Region, Sandia Province, on the border of the districts Limbani and Patambuco. It lies at the Ariquma valley northeast of the peaks of Ariquma.
