= Crucero District =

Coordinates: 14°21′38″S 70°01′20″W

Crucero
- District
- Interactive map of Crucero
- Country: Peru
- Region: Puno
- Province: Carabaya
- Capital: Crucero

Government
  - Mayor: Alwin Saturnino Cutipa Mamani

Area
  - Total: 836.37 km^{2} (322.92 sq mi)
- Elevation: 4,124 m (13,530 ft)

Population (2005 census)
  - Total: 8,761
  - Density: 10.48/km^{2} (27.13/sq mi)
- Time zone: UTC-5 (PET)
- UBIGEO: 210306

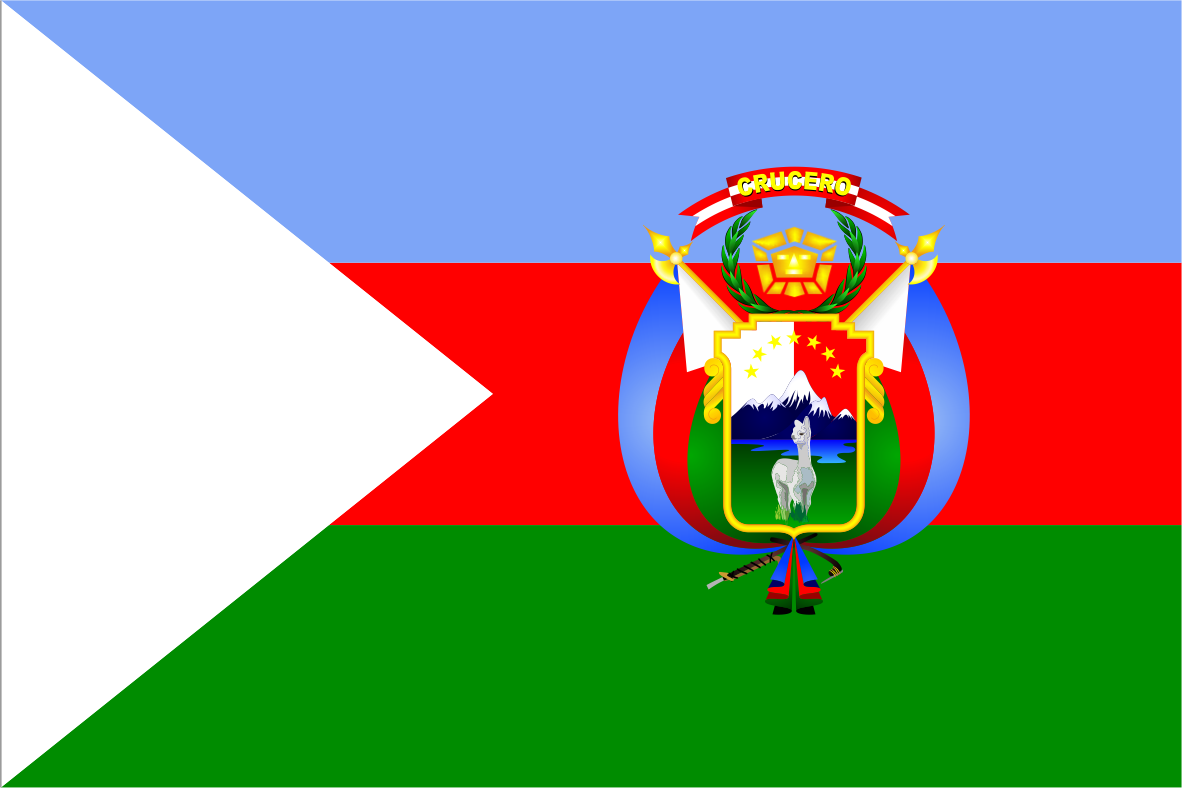
Flag of Crucero District

Crucero District is one of ten districts of the province Carabaya in Peru.

== Geography ==
One of the highest peaks of the district is Ariquma at approximately 5,350 m (17,550 ft). Other mountains are listed below:

- Apachita
- Challwani Urqu
- Chunta Q'atawi
- Kuntur Ikiña
- K'ank'awini
- Laramani
- Liqiliqini
- Luk'ana
- Maran Sarani
- Pinkillu Punta
- Pinkilluni Urqu
- Q'ara Pata Kunka
- Qayqu
- Qayqu Tira
- Qinamari
- Q'alawaña
- Rit'ikunka
- Sapan Qullu
- Sura Pata
- Takuni
- Tampu K'ark'a
- Taypi Kunka
- Wila Sirka
- Wiluyuq Urqu
- Yana Urqu

== Ethnic groups ==
The people in the district are mainly indigenous citizens of Quechua descent. Quechua is the language which the majority of the population (75.80%) learnt to speak in childhood, 23.89% of the residents started speaking using the Spanish language (2007 Peru Census).

== Climate ==
Climate data for Crucero, elevation 4,128 m (13,543 ft), (1991–2020)
Month	Jan	Feb	Mar	Apr	May	Jun	Jul	Aug	Sep	Oct	Nov	Dec	Year
Mean daily maximum °C (°F)	14.7 (58.5)	14.6 (58.3)	14.3 (57.7)	14.7 (58.5)	15.0 (59.0)	14.8 (58.6)	14.6 (58.3)	15.1 (59.2)	15.0 (59.0)	15.2 (59.4)	15.6 (60.1)	14.8 (58.6)	14.9 (58.8)
Mean daily minimum °C (°F)	2.4 (36.3)	2.5 (36.5)	1.5 (34.7)	−0.7 (30.7)	−5.0 (23.0)	−8.2 (17.2)	−9.5 (14.9)	−8.1 (17.4)	−4.0 (24.8)	−0.6 (30.9)	0.1 (32.2)	1.5 (34.7)	−2.3 (27.8)
Average precipitation mm (inches)	128.4 (5.06)	114.6 (4.51)	95.7 (3.77)	36.8 (1.45)	13.6 (0.54)	5.7 (0.22)	4.2 (0.17)	11.7 (0.46)	22.2 (0.87)	47.8 (1.88)	64.0 (2.52)	94.5 (3.72)	639.2 (25.17)
Source: National Meteorology and Hydrology Service of Peru

== See also ==
- Ariquma Lake
- Wiluyuq Qucha
