= Phara District =

Coordinates: 14.0740°S 70.1005°W

Phara
- District
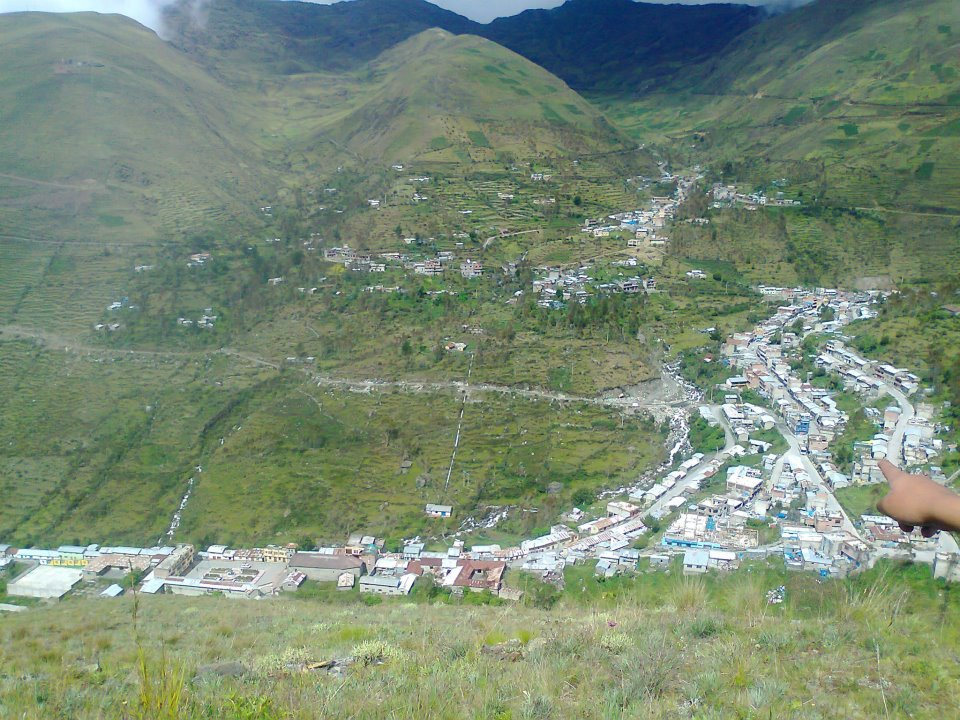
- Interactive map of Phara
- Country: Peru
- Region: Puno
- Province: Sandia
- Capital: Phara

Government
  - Mayor: Alfredo Paredes Meza

Area
  - Total: 400.9 km^{2} (154.8 sq mi)
- Elevation: 3,450 m (11,320 ft)

Population (2005 census)
  - Total: 6,456
  - Density: 16.10/km^{2} (41.71/sq mi)
- Time zone: UTC-5 (PET)
- UBIGEO: 211205

Phara District is one of ten districts of the province Sandia in Peru.

== Ethnic groups ==
The people in the district are mainly indigenous citizens of Quechua descent. Quechua is the language which the majority of the population (72.16%) learnt to speak in childhood, 27.31% of the residents started speaking using the Spanish language (2007 Peru Census).
