= Sayt'uqucha =

Sayt'uqucha may refer to:

- Sayt'uqucha (Lampa), a lake in Peru
- Sayt'uqucha (San Román), a lake in Peru
- Sayt'uqucha (Sandia), a lake in Peru
