= Atengo =

- Municipality and town
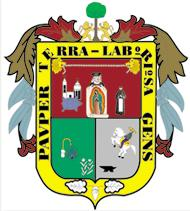
- Coat of arms

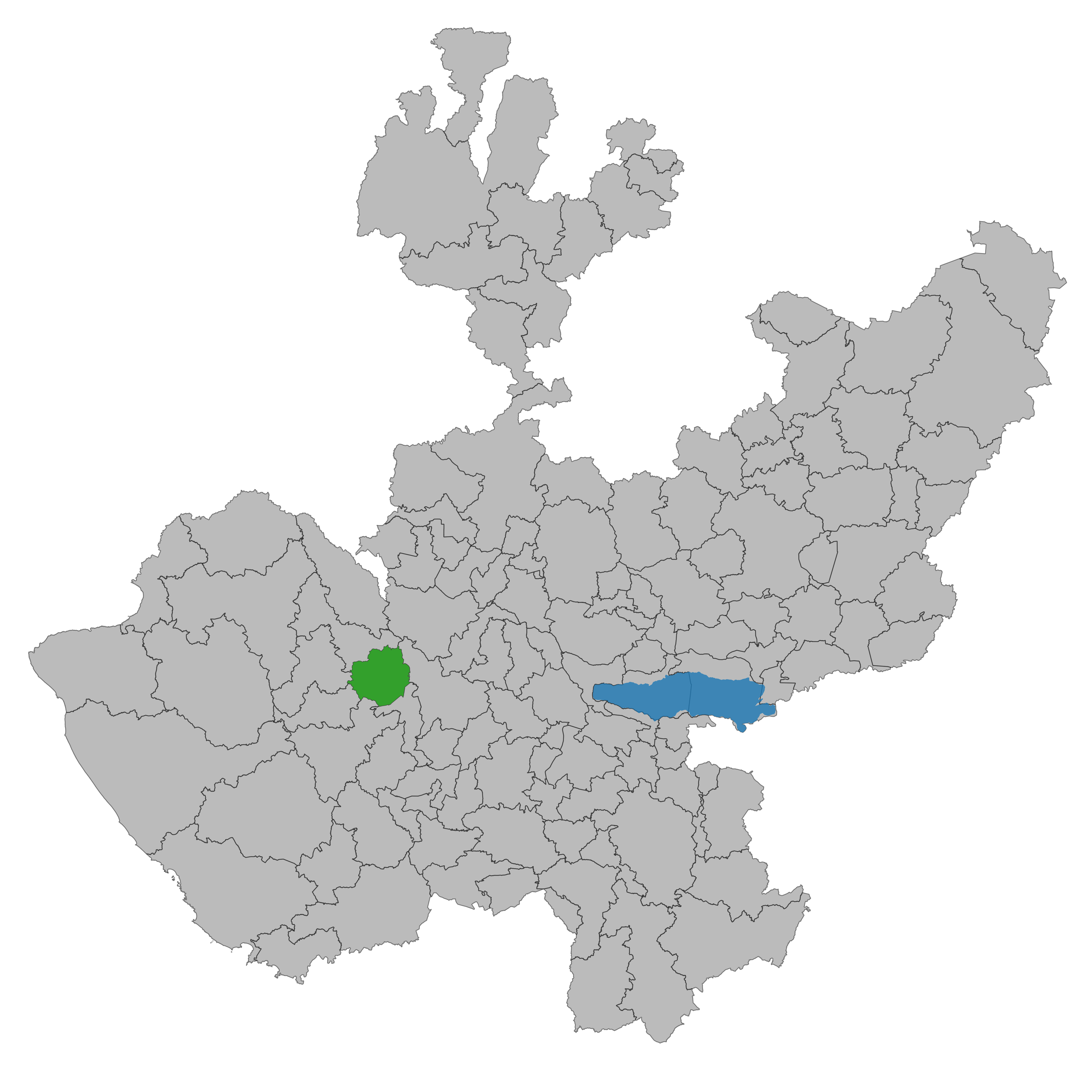
- Location of the municipality in Jalisco

- Location in Mexico
- Coordinates: 20°13′N 104°05′W
- Country: Mexico
- State: Jalisco

Area
  - Total: 440.6 km^{2} (170.1 sq mi)
  - Town: 2.37 km^{2} (0.92 sq mi)

Population (2020 census)
  - Total: 5,599
  - Density: 12.71/km^{2} (32.91/sq mi)
  - Town: 1,639
  - Town density: 692/km^{2} (1,790/sq mi)

Atengo is both a small town and a municipality of the region Sierra de Amula in the Mexican state Jalisco.

The municipality covers an area of 440.6 km^{2} (170.1 sq mi) and is 1,417 m above sea level. As of the year 2005, the municipality had a total population of 4,918. The name "Atengo" in the Nahuatl language can be translated to: "at the edge of the water", and may also be interpreted as either: "place situated at the border of the river" or "at the bank", additionally; Atengo was once inhabited by an indigenous Toltec people who worshiped an idol which they referred to as "Pupuca". The following is a list of cities, towns, villages, and/or hamlets located in the municipality of Atengo: Agostadero, Atengo, Confradia de Lepe, Confradia de Pimienta, Crucero, El Macuchi, El Ojo de Agua, El Quemado, El Salitre Grande, El Salitre de Sedano, Huaxtla, La Chale, Las Juntas, Los Arribeños, San Pedro la Chale, San Rafael, Soyatlán del Oro, Tacota, Telexeca, Trigo de Alteñas, and La Yerbabuena.
