= Yana Urqu (Puno) =

Mountain in Peru

- Location within Peru

Highest point
- Elevation: 5,000 m (16,000 ft)
- Coordinates: 14°17′55″S 69°46′12″W

Geography
- Location: Peru
- Parent range: Andes

Yana Urqu (Quechua yana black, urqu mountain, "black mountain", hispanicized spelling Yana Orjo) is a mountain in the Andes of Peru, about 5,000-metre (16,000 ft) high . It is located in the Puno Region, Sandia Province, Limbani District. It lies near Ariquma.
