= Inambari =

Inambari may refer to:

- Inambari River, Peru
- Inambari District, Tambopata, Peru
- Alto Inambari District, Sandia, Peru
