= Wirta Pata =

Mountain in Peru

- Location within Peru

Highest point
- Elevation: 5,200 m (17,100 ft)
- Coordinates: 14°14′25″S 69°46′55″W

Geography
- Location: Peru
- Parent range: Andes

Wirta Pata (Aymara wirta vegetable garden (a borrowing from Spanish huerta), pata step, "vegetable garden step", also spelled Huerta Pata) is a mountain in the Andes of Peru and the name of a lake near the mountain. The mountain and the lake are located in the Puno Region, Sandia Province, Limbani District. The mountain is about 5,200 metres (17,060 ft) high. It lies north of the peaks of Ariquma and Ankayuq K'uchu, and southwest of the lakes Ch'uxñaquta ("green lake", Chocñecota) and Tinkiqucha (Tinquicocha).

The lake named Wirta Pata lies northwest of the mountain at 14°13′24″S 69°48′00″W.
