= Pedro Vilca Apaza District =

Coordinates: 15.0622°S 69.8837°W

Pedro Vilca Apaza
- District
- Interactive map of Pedro Vilca Apaza
- Country: Peru
- Region: Puno
- Province: San Antonio de Putina
- Founded: March 17, 1962
- Capital: Ayrampuni

Government
  - Mayor: Cecilio Maldonado

Area
  - Total: 565.81 km^{2} (218.46 sq mi)
- Elevation: 3,852 m (12,638 ft)

Population (2007 census)
  - Total: 2,523
  - Density: 4.459/km^{2} (11.55/sq mi)
- Time zone: UTC-5 (PET)
- UBIGEO: 211003

Pedro Vilca Apaza District is one of five districts of the province San Antonio de Putina in Peru.

== History ==
Pedro Vilca Apaza District was created on March 17, 1962.

== Geography ==
One of the highest mountains of the district is Wayruruni at approximately 4,600 m (15,100 ft). Other mountains are listed below:

- Allqamarini
- Inka Kancha
- Janq'u Qullu
- Jichu Sirkani
- Kimsa Pukara
- Kuntur Wachana
- Minas Chaka
- Pukar Pata
- Qanta Qantaña
- Quytu Qullu
- Turini
- Wila Qutaña

== Ethnic groups ==
The people in the district are mainly indigenous citizens of Quechua descent. Quechua is the language which the majority of the population (89.53%) learnt to speak in childhood, 4.32% of the residents started speaking using the Spanish language (2007 Peru Census).

== Mayors ==
- 2011–2014: Cecilio Maldonado Cañapataña.
- 2007–2010: Juan Pablo Salas Chipana.

== See also ==
- Administrative divisions of Peru
- Pedro Vilca Apaza
