= Ananea District =

Coordinates: 14.6325°S 69.4458°W

Ananea Ananiya distritu
- District
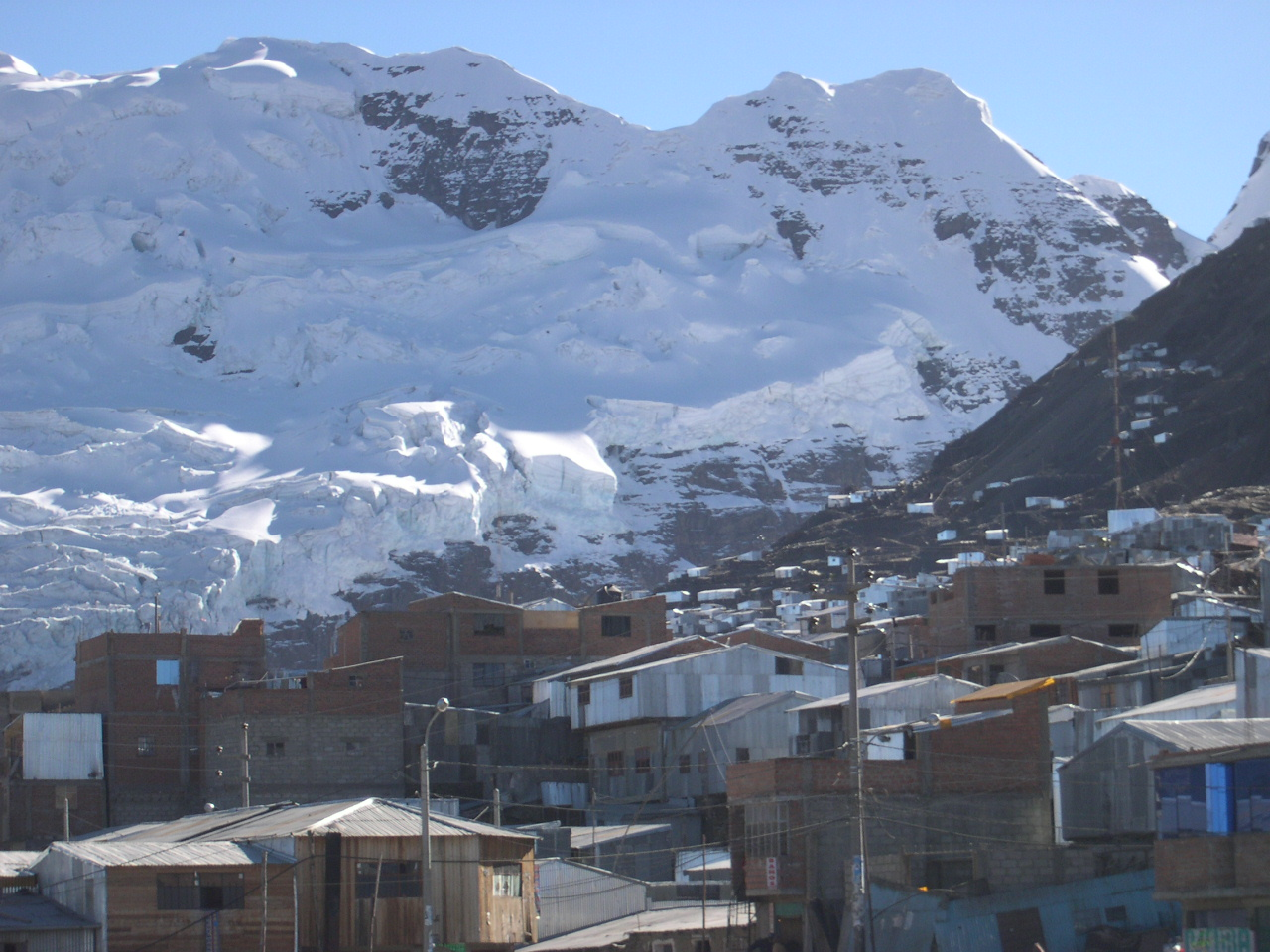
- La Rinconada with Awchita in the background

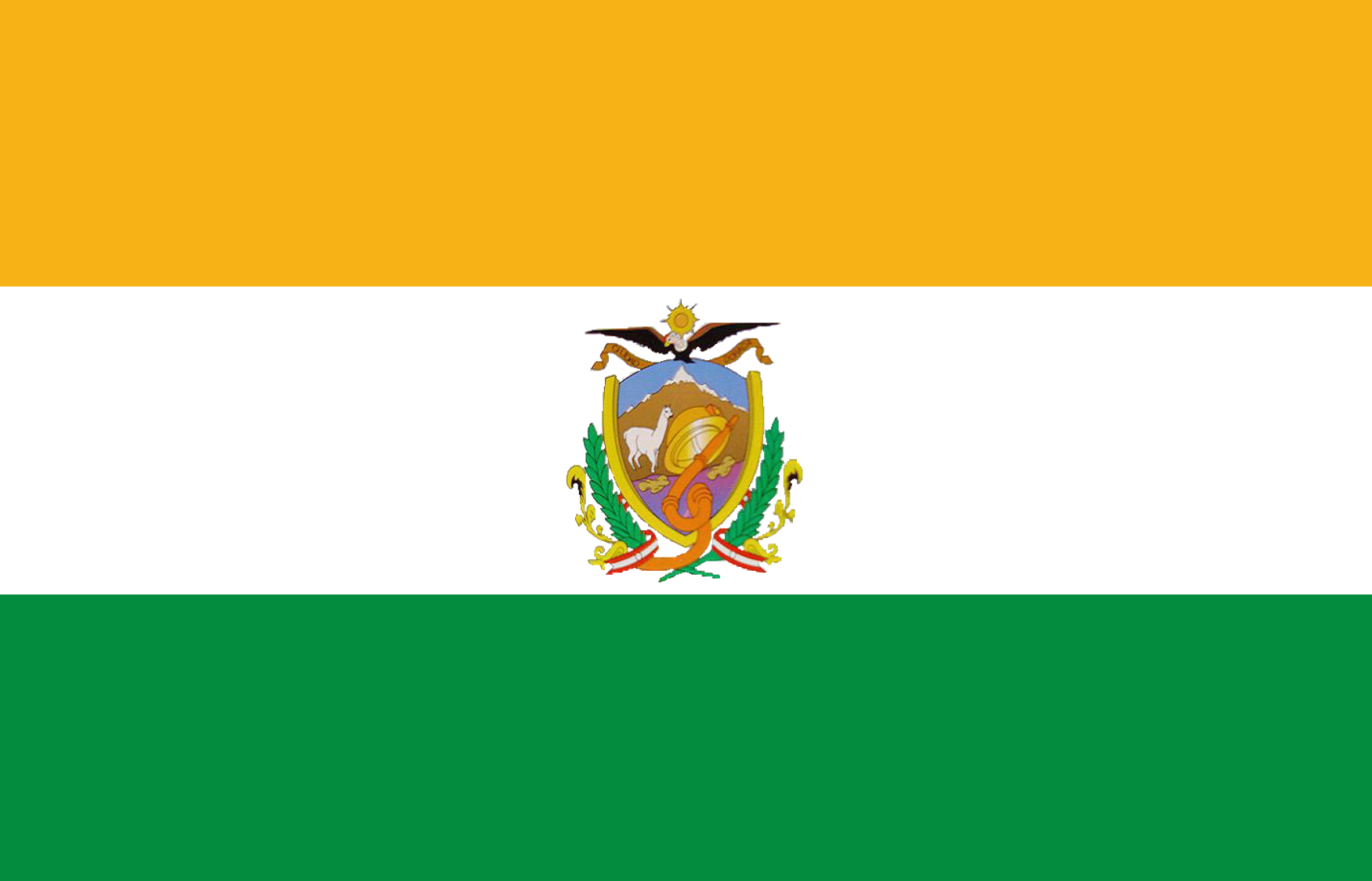
- Flag
- Interactive map of Ananea
- Country: Peru
- Region: Puno
- Province: San Antonio de Putina
- Founded: May 2, 1854
- Capital: Ananea

Government
  - Mayor: Samuel Chambi Sánchez

Area
  - Total: 939.56 km^{2} (362.77 sq mi)
- Elevation: 4,660 m (15,290 ft)

Population (2005 census)
  - Total: 19,132
  - Density: 20.363/km^{2} (52.739/sq mi)
- Time zone: UTC-5 (PET)
- UBIGEO: 211002

Ananea District is one of five districts of the San Antonio de Putina Province in Peru.

== Geography ==
The Apolobamba mountain range traverses the district. One of the highest peaks of the district is Palumani at 5,723 m (18,776 ft) above sea level. Other mountains are listed below:

- Allqamarini
- Ananea
- Chapi
- Chuqichampi
- Ch'uxñaquta
- Jach'a Tira
- Kimsa Tira
- Kunka
- Kuntur Ikiña
- Kuntur Thamaña
- Laramani
- Lawa Tira
- Lisani
- Llawlli
- Mamanini
- Ñuñuwani
- Puka Urqu
- Puma Wachana
- Qachini
- Qala K'umu
- Qaqa Waychu
- Qillwani
- Qurwari
- Rit'ipata
- Rit'i Urmasqa
- Uqi Nasa
- Uyuni
- Yana Uma

== History ==
Ananea District was created on May 2, 1854.

== Ethnic groups ==
The people in the district are mainly indigenous citizens of Quechua descent. Quechua is the language which the majority of the population (57.88%) learnt to speak in childhood, 36.50% of the residents started speaking using the Spanish language (2007 Peru Census).

== Climate ==
Ananea, due to extreme elevation, experiences an alpine tundra climate (Köppen climate classification, ETH), with constant cold temperatures throughout the entire year.

Climate data for Ananea, elevation 4,660 m (15,290 ft), (1991–2020)
Month	Jan	Feb	Mar	Apr	May	Jun	Jul	Aug	Sep	Oct	Nov	Dec	Year
Mean daily maximum °C (°F)	9.9 (49.8)	10.1 (50.2)	10.3 (50.5)	10.7 (51.3)	11.0 (51.8)	10.9 (51.6)	10.5 (50.9)	10.9 (51.6)	10.7 (51.3)	10.8 (51.4)	11.2 (52.2)	10.3 (50.5)	10.6 (51.1)
Daily mean °C (°F)	4.7 (40.5)	4.8 (40.6)	4.6 (40.3)	4.7 (40.5)	4.4 (39.9)	3.7 (38.7)	3.2 (37.8)	3.5 (38.3)	3.8 (38.8)	4.5 (40.1)	4.9 (40.8)	4.8 (40.6)	4.3 (39.7)
Mean daily minimum °C (°F)	−0.6 (30.9)	−0.6 (30.9)	−1.0 (30.2)	−1.4 (29.5)	−2.2 (28.0)	−3.4 (25.9)	−4.0 (24.8)	−3.8 (25.2)	−3.0 (26.6)	−1.9 (28.6)	−1.4 (29.5)	−0.8 (30.6)	−2.0 (28.4)
Average precipitation mm (inches)	126.0 (4.96)	101.7 (4.00)	90.2 (3.55)	43.4 (1.71)	14.3 (0.56)	6.9 (0.27)	6.3 (0.25)	11.9 (0.47)	21.9 (0.86)	45.3 (1.78)	56.7 (2.23)	86.5 (3.41)	611.1 (24.05)
Source: National Meteorology and Hydrology Service of Peru

== Mayors ==
- 2011–2014: Samuel Ramos Quispe.
- 2007–2010: Crispín Amanqui Rodríguez.

== Festivities ==
- July:
  - Our Lady of Mount Carmel.
  - James, son of Zebedee.

== See also ==
- Chullpaqucha
