= Sandia District =

Coordinates: 14.2333°S 69.4333°W

Sandia
- District
- Interactive map of Sandia
- Country: Peru
- Region: Puno
- Province: Sandia
- Capital: Sandia

Government
  - Mayor: Angel Mario Quispe Quispe

Area
  - Total: 580.13 km^{2} (223.99 sq mi)
- Elevation: 2,178 m (7,146 ft)

Population (2005 census)
  - Total: 12,364
  - Density: 21.312/km^{2} (55.199/sq mi)
- Time zone: UTC-5 (PET)
- UBIGEO: 211201

Sandia District is one of ten districts of the province Sandia in Peru.

== Ethnic groups ==
The people in the district are mainly indigenous citizens of Quechua descent. Quechua is the language which the majority of the population (67.34%) learnt to speak in childhood, 31.67% of the residents started speaking using the Spanish language (2007 Peru Census).

== See also ==
- Mawk'allaqta
