= Telexeca =

Coordinates: 20°21′50.91″N 104°10′49.60″W

- Interactive map of Telexeca
- Country: Mexico
- State: Jalisco
- Municipality: Atengo
- Elevation: 1,540 m (5,050 ft)
- Time zone: UTC-6 (Central Standard Time)
  - Summer (DST): UTC-5 (Central Daylight Time)

Telexeca is a rural village in the municipality of Atengo, which is itself in the region of Sierra de Amula. Additionally, the region is it itself in the Mexican state of Jalisco. The location's medium height over sea level is 1,540 meters. Currently, there are probably about three inhabitants in Telexeca. All three inhabitants are apparently neither: adults, illiterate, of indigenous descent, nor speak an indigenous language.

== Climate ==
Climate data for Telexeca
Month	Jan	Feb	Mar	Apr	May	Jun	Jul	Aug	Sep	Oct	Nov	Dec	Year
Mean daily maximum °C (°F)	27.9 (82.2)	29.9 (85.8)	31.4 (88.5)	33.1 (91.6)	34 (93)	31.8 (89.2)	29.8 (85.6)	30.2 (86.4)	30.2 (86.4)	30.5 (86.9)	29.8 (85.6)	28.2 (82.8)	30.6 (87.1)
Mean daily minimum °C (°F)	1.4 (34.5)	2.5 (36.5)	6.5 (43.7)	9.2 (48.6)	12.7 (54.9)	16.3 (61.3)	16 (61)	16.3 (61.3)	16.0 (60.8)	13.8 (56.8)	6.3 (43.3)	3.1 (37.6)	10 (50)
Average precipitation mm (inches)	33 (1.3)	13 (0.5)	5.1 (0.2)	5.1 (0.2)	18 (0.7)	150 (5.8)	210 (8.3)	180 (7)	110 (4.5)	38 (1.5)	10 (0.4)	20 (0.8)	790 (31.2)
Source: Weatherbase
