= Limbani District =

Coordinates: 14.1361°S 70.2604°W

Limbani
- District
- Interactive map of Limbani
- Country: Peru
- Region: Puno
- Province: Sandia
- Founded: December 28, 1908
- Capital: Limbani

Government
  - Mayor: Percy Fermin Soncco Quispe

Area
  - Total: 2,112.34 km^{2} (815.58 sq mi)
- Elevation: 3,320 m (10,890 ft)

Population (2005 census)
  - Total: 4,407
  - Density: 2.086/km^{2} (5.404/sq mi)
- Time zone: UTC-5 (PET)
- UBIGEO: 211203

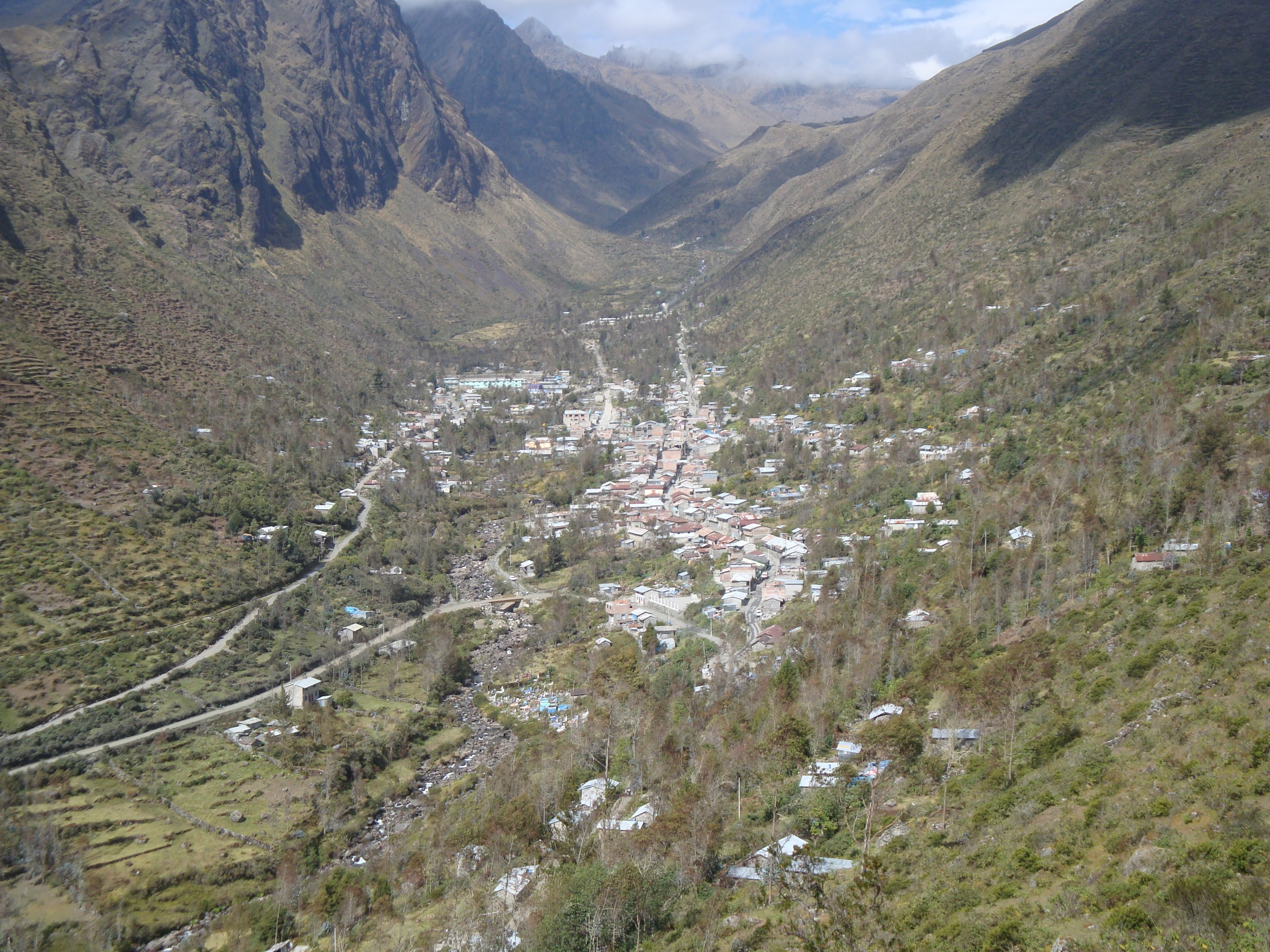
Limbani, Peru

Limbani District is one of ten districts of the province Sandia in Peru.

== Geography ==
Some of the highest mountains of the district are listed below:

- Ankayuq K'uchu
- Ariquma
- Ch'uxñaquta
- K'ark'a Chunta
- Puka Pukayuq
- Q'alawaña
- Surapata Urqu
- Warachani
- Wirta Pata
- Yana Urqu

== Ethnic groups ==
The people in the district are mainly indigenous citizens of Quechua descent. Quechua is the language which the majority of the population (60.58%) learnt to speak in childhood, 38.52% of the residents started speaking using the Spanish language (2007 Peru Census).

== Climate ==
Climate data for Limbani, elevation 3,320 m (10,890 ft), (1981–2010)
Month	Jan	Feb	Mar	Apr	May	Jun	Jul	Aug	Sep	Oct	Nov	Dec	Year
Mean daily maximum °C (°F)	15.4 (59.7)	15.9 (60.6)	16.2 (61.2)	16.6 (61.9)	16.7 (62.1)	16.3 (61.3)	16.4 (61.5)	15.6 (60.1)	15.9 (60.6)	15.8 (60.4)	16.3 (61.3)	15.8 (60.4)	16.1 (60.9)
Mean daily minimum °C (°F)	5.7 (42.3)	5.6 (42.1)	5.8 (42.4)	5.0 (41.0)	3.5 (38.3)	2.1 (35.8)	1.8 (35.2)	3.3 (37.9)	4.2 (39.6)	4.9 (40.8)	5.1 (41.2)	5.7 (42.3)	4.4 (39.9)
Average precipitation mm (inches)	238.0 (9.37)	235.3 (9.26)	165.0 (6.50)	74.0 (2.91)	34.9 (1.37)	24.2 (0.95)	28.6 (1.13)	44.0 (1.73)	64.3 (2.53)	117.3 (4.62)	124.6 (4.91)	210.7 (8.30)	1,360.9 (53.58)
Source: National Meteorology and Hydrology Service of Peru (precipitation 1991−2020)
