= Jalahuana =

Mountain in Peru

- Location within Peru

Highest point
- Elevation: 5,325 m (17,470 ft)
- Coordinates: 14°20′05″S 69°44′13″W

Geography
- Location: Peru
- Parent range: Andes

Jalahuana or Jalahuaña (possibly from Quechua q'ala naked, nude, waña a variety of bitter potatoes used to make white ch'uñu, "naked waña potato") is a 5,325-metre-high (17,470 ft) mountain in the Andes of Peru. It is located in the Puno Region, Carabaya Province, Crucero District, and in the Sandia Province, on the border of the Limbani District and the Patambuco District. Jalahuana lies east of Aricoma Lake between the mountain Aricoma in the northwest and Riticunca in the southeast to south.
