= Quiaca District =

Coordinates: 14.4306°S 69.6324°W

Quiaca
- District
- Interactive map of Quiaca
- Country: Peru
- Region: Puno
- Province: Sandia
- Capital: Quiaca

Government
  - Mayor: Concepcion Mamani Condori

Area
  - Total: 447.9 km^{2} (172.9 sq mi)
- Elevation: 2,950 m (9,680 ft)

Population (2005 census)
  - Total: 2,419
  - Density: 5.401/km^{2} (13.99/sq mi)
- Time zone: UTC-5 (PET)
- UBIGEO: 211206

Quiaca District is one of ten districts of the province Sandia in Peru.

== Geography ==
The Apolobamba mountain range traverses the district. Some of the highest mountains of the districtare listed below:

- Ananea
- Chimpa Qiswarani
- K'ayrani
- Liqiliqini
- Qaqinkurani
- Qucha Kunka
- Quchapata
- Rit'ipata
- Wanakuni
- Wilaquta
- Yana Urqu

== Ethnic groups ==
The people in the district are mainly indigenous citizens of Quechua descent. Quechua is the language which the majority of the population (83.15%) learnt to speak in childhood, 15.21% of the residents started speaking using the Spanish language (2007 Peru Census).
