= Sayt'uqucha (Sandia) =

Lake in Peru

- Location within Peru
- Location: Puno Region, Sandia Province
- Coordinates: 14°29′02″S 69°40′06″W
- Basin countries: Peru

Sayt'uqucha or Sayt'u Qucha (Quechua suyt'u, sayt'u rectangular, qucha lake, lagoon, "rectangular lake", Hispanicized spellings Saytococha) is a lake in Peru. It is situated in the Puno Region, Sandia Province, Cuyocuyo District.
