= Pukara (Sandia) =

Archaeological site in Peru

- Location within Peru

Highest point
- Elevation: 4,200 m (13,800 ft)
- Coordinates: 14°23′05″S 69°37′33″W

Geography
- Location: Peru
- Parent range: Andes

Pukara (Quechua for fortress, Hispanicized spelling Pucara) is a mountain in the Andes of Peru, about 4,200-metre (13,800 ft) high, with an archaeological site on top. It is located in the Puno Region, Sandia Province, Patambuco District, southwest of Patambuco. The pre-Inca funerary site is also known as Trinchera (Spanish for trench). The place was declared a National Cultural Heritage by Resolución Directoral Nacional No. 296/INC-2003 by the National Institute of Culture. It consists of tombs, walls, houses, squares and tunnels.
