= Jajahuaycho =

Mountain in Peru

- Location within Peru

Highest point
- Elevation: 5,200 m (17,100 ft)
- Coordinates: 14°42′10″S 69°18′05″W

Geography
- Location: Peru
- Parent range: Andes, Apolobamba

Jajahuaycho or Ccaccahuaycho (possibly from Aymara for a swift) is a mountain in the Apolobamba mountain range in Peru and the name of a lake near the mountain. The mountain and the lake are located in the Puno Region, Putina Province, Ananea District. The peak reaches about 5,200 metres (17,060 ft) above sea level. It lies northwest of the mountains Palomani and Chocñacota and west of the lake Chocñacota. Parihuani ("the one with flamingos") and Huanacuni ("the one with guanacos") are the names of the northwestern and northeastern peaks of Jajahuaycho.

The lake named Jajahuaycho stretches along the northern slopes of the mountain. It lies at 14°41′26″S 69°17′44″W.
