= Cuyocuyo District =

Coordinates: 14.4829°S 69.8302°W

Cuyocuyo
- District
- Interactive map of Cuyocuyo
- Country: Peru
- Region: Puno
- Province: Sandia
- Founded: May 2, 1854
- Capital: Cuyocuyo

Government
  - Mayor: Zacarias Santamaria Paye

Area
  - Total: 503.91 km^{2} (194.56 sq mi)
- Elevation: 3,450 m (11,320 ft)

Population (2005 census)
  - Total: 8,062
  - Density: 16.00/km^{2} (41.44/sq mi)
- Time zone: UTC-5 (PET)
- UBIGEO: 211202

Cuyocuyo District is one of ten districts of the province Sandia in Peru.

== Geography ==
The Apolobamba mountain range traverses the district. One of the highest elevations of the district is Qurwari at approximately 5,200 m (17,100 ft). Other mountains are listed below:

- Ch'uwaña
- Janq'u Uma
- Kuntur Ikiña
- Kunturini
- Machu Llaqta
- Maran Sarani
- Pirwani
- P'ujru
- Qurwari
- Saywa
- Sura Pata
- Tikani
- Utkhuqaqa
- Wilaquta

== Ethnic groups ==
The people in the district are mainly indigenous citizens of Quechua descent. Quechua is the language which the majority of the population (79.81%) learnt to speak in childhood, 19.79% of the residents started speaking using the Spanish language (2007 Peru Census).

== Climate ==
Climate data for Cuyocuyo, elevation 3,414 m (11,201 ft), (1981–2010)
Month	Jan	Feb	Mar	Apr	May	Jun	Jul	Aug	Sep	Oct	Nov	Dec	Year
Mean daily maximum °C (°F)	13.4 (56.1)	13.9 (57.0)	14.0 (57.2)	14.4 (57.9)	13.9 (57.0)	14.1 (57.4)	13.7 (56.7)	13.9 (57.0)	13.7 (56.7)	13.9 (57.0)	14.2 (57.6)	13.5 (56.3)	13.9 (57.0)
Mean daily minimum °C (°F)	5.8 (42.4)	5.8 (42.4)	5.3 (41.5)	4.3 (39.7)	3.1 (37.6)	2.4 (36.3)	2.4 (36.3)	3.0 (37.4)	3.8 (38.8)	4.7 (40.5)	5.3 (41.5)	5.5 (41.9)	4.3 (39.7)
Average precipitation mm (inches)	132.4 (5.21)	125.9 (4.96)	95.3 (3.75)	47.6 (1.87)	19.9 (0.78)	9.5 (0.37)	13.6 (0.54)	21.4 (0.84)	32.2 (1.27)	54.0 (2.13)	52.8 (2.08)	90.5 (3.56)	695.1 (27.36)
Source: National Meteorology and Hydrology Service of Peru (precipitation 1991−2020)

== See also ==
- Sayt'uqucha
