= San Pedro de Putina Punco District =

Coordinates: 14.1129°S 69.0457°W

San Pedro de Putina Punco
- District
- Location of San Pedro de Putina Puncu in the Sandia Province
- Country: Peru
- Region: Puno
- Province: Sandia
- Founded: May 13, 2005
- Capital: Putina Punco

Government
  - Mayor: Ernesto Yujra Enriquez

Area
  - Total: 5,361.88 km^{2} (2,070.23 sq mi)
- Elevation: 950 m (3,120 ft)

Population (2005 census)
  - Total: 8,939
  - Density: 1.667/km^{2} (4.318/sq mi)
- Time zone: UTC-5 (PET)
- UBIGEO: 211210

San Pedro de Putina Puncu District is one of ten districts of the province Sandia in Peru.
