= Patambuco District =

Coordinates: 14.2704°S 69.8481°W

Patambuco
- District
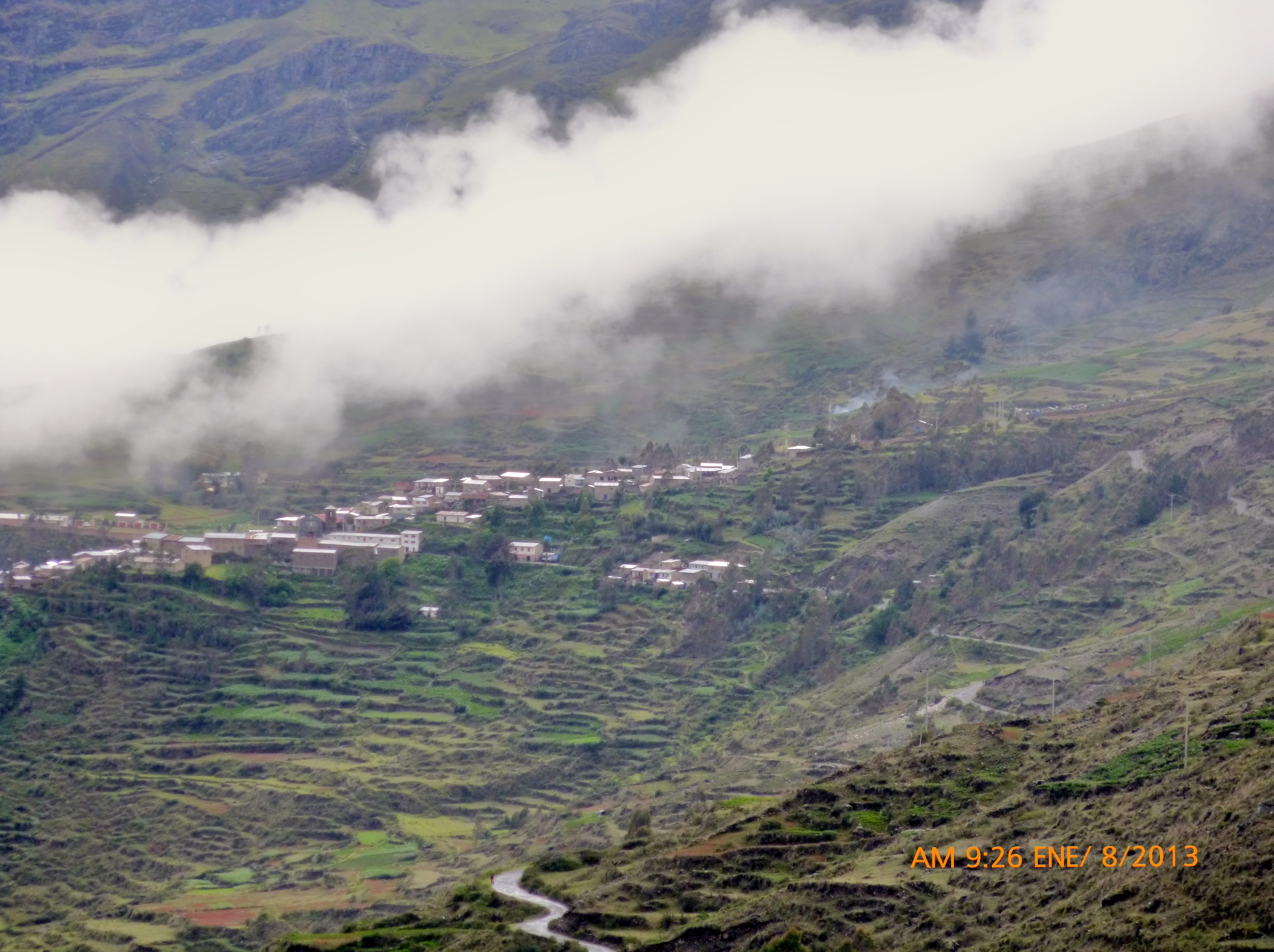
- Patambuco as seen from Kuntur Sinqa
- Interactive map of Patambuco
- Country: Peru
- Region: Puno
- Province: Sandia
- Capital: Patambuco

Government
  - Mayor: Angel Silvestre Ochoa Colque

Area
  - Total: 462.72 km^{2} (178.66 sq mi)
- Elevation: 3,588 m (11,772 ft)

Population (2005 census)
  - Total: 4,833
  - Density: 10.44/km^{2} (27.05/sq mi)
- Time zone: UTC-5 (PET)
- UBIGEO: 211204

Patambuco District is one of ten districts of the Sandia Province in Peru.

== Geography ==
One of the highest elevations of the district is Q'alawaña at 5,325 m (17,470 ft). Other mountains are listed below:

- Ch'usiqani
- Hatun Apachita
- Hatun Pinkilluni
- Huch'uy Apachita
- Huch'uy Pinkilluni
- Janq'u Qala
- Jiwaña
- Kimsa Chata
- Maran Sarani
- Mulli P'unqu
- Pinkilluni
- Pirwani
- Pukara
- Phaqcha Pata
- Qaqa Wasi
- Qayqu Tira
- Qutaña Urqu
- Q'alawaña
- Q'asa
- Rit'i Chaki
- Rit'i Kunka
- Rit'i K'uchu
- Surayuq
- Warachani
- Yana Qaqa

== Ethnic groups ==
The people in the district are mainly indigenous citizens of Quechua descent. Quechua is the language which the majority of the population (89.65%) learnt to speak in childhood, 9.77% of the residents started speaking using the Spanish language (2007 Peru Census).

== See also ==
- Quchak'uchu
- Qulu Qulu
