= Chunta Q'atawi =

Mountain in Peru

- Location within Peru

Highest point
- Elevation: 5,001 m (16,407 ft)
- Coordinates: 14°17′23″S 69°56′37″W

Geography
- Location: Peru
- Parent range: Andes

Chunta Q'atawi (Aymara chunta prolonged, lengthened, q'atawi lime, "prolonged lime (mountain)", Hispanicized spelling Chuntajatahui) is a 5,001-metre-high (16,407 ft) mountain in the Andes of Peru. It is situated in the Puno Region, Carabaya Province, Crucero District.
