= San Juan del Oro District =

Coordinates: 14.2869°S 69.2166°W

San Juan del Oro
- District
- Interactive map of San Juan del Oro
- Country: Peru
- Region: Puno
- Province: Sandia
- Founded: November 7, 1955
- Capital: San Juan del Oro

Government
  - Mayor: Cesar Zegarra Lipa

Area
  - Total: 197.14 km^{2} (76.12 sq mi)
- Elevation: 1,320 m (4,330 ft)

Population (2005 census)
  - Total: 5,624
  - Density: 28.53/km^{2} (73.89/sq mi)
- Time zone: UTC-5 (PET)
- UBIGEO: 211207

San Juan del Oro District is one of ten districts of the province Sandia in Peru.

== Climate ==
Climate data for Tambopata, elevation 1,373 m (4,505 ft), (1991–2020)
Month	Jan	Feb	Mar	Apr	May	Jun	Jul	Aug	Sep	Oct	Nov	Dec	Year
Mean daily maximum °C (°F)	26.8 (80.2)	26.4 (79.5)	26.6 (79.9)	26.2 (79.2)	24.8 (76.6)	24.1 (75.4)	24.2 (75.6)	25.9 (78.6)	27.2 (81.0)	28.0 (82.4)	27.8 (82.0)	27.1 (80.8)	26.3 (79.3)
Mean daily minimum °C (°F)	16.9 (62.4)	16.9 (62.4)	16.9 (62.4)	16.4 (61.5)	15.3 (59.5)	14.5 (58.1)	13.5 (56.3)	13.7 (56.7)	14.5 (58.1)	15.7 (60.3)	16.8 (62.2)	17.1 (62.8)	15.7 (60.2)
Average precipitation mm (inches)	213.8 (8.42)	180.8 (7.12)	154.1 (6.07)	98.0 (3.86)	56.0 (2.20)	31.2 (1.23)	37.2 (1.46)	48.6 (1.91)	58.7 (2.31)	119.8 (4.72)	143.8 (5.66)	193.4 (7.61)	1,335.4 (52.57)
Source: National Meteorology and Hydrology Service of Peru
