= Pinkilluni (Puno) =

Mountain in Peru

- Location within Peru

Highest point
- Elevation: 4,800 m (15,700 ft)
- Coordinates: 14°17′53″S 69°41′33″W

Geography
- Location: Peru
- Parent range: Andes

Pinkilluni (Quechua pinkillu a kind of flute, Aymara -ni a suffix to indicate ownership, "the one with a pinkillu", Hispanicized spelling Pinquillone) is a mountain in the Andes of Peru, about 4,800 metres (15,748 ft) high. It is located in the Puno Region, Sandia Province, Patambuco District. It lies north of the mountain Huch'uy Pinkilluni ("little Pinkilluni", Uchuy Pinquillone) and northeast of Hatun Pinkilluni.
