= Lake Chullpacocha =

Lake in Peru

- Location within Peru
- Location: Puno Region
- Coordinates: 14°44′05″S 69°32′26″W
- Basin countries: Peru

Lake Chullpacocha (possibly from Quechua chullpa an ancient burial tower, qucha lake, "chullpa lake") is a lake in the Andes of Peru. It is located in the Puno Region, Putina Province, Ananea District, south of Ananea.
