= Puma Wachana =

Mountain in Peru

- Location within Peru

Highest point
- Elevation: 5,000 m (16,000 ft)
- Coordinates: 14°40′43″S 69°43′48″W

Geography
- Location: Peru
- Parent range: Andes

Puma Wachana (Quechua puma cougar, puma, wacha birth, to give birth, -na a suffix, "where the cougar is born", Hispanicized spelling Puma Huachana) is a mountain in Peru, about 5,000 metres (16,404 ft) high. It is located in the Puno Region, Putina Province, in the west of the Ananea District.
