= Mawk'allaqta, Sandia =

Archaeological site in Peru

Mawk'allaqta
- Location: Peru, Puno Region, Sandia Province
- Region: Andes

Mawk'allaqta, also Mawk'a Llaqta, (Quechua mawk'a ancient, llaqta place (village, town, city, country, nation), "ancient place", Hispanicized spelling Maukallacta) is an archaeological site in Peru. It is located in the Puno Region, Sandia Province, Sandia District. The site was declared a National Cultural Heritage (Patrimonio Cultural) of Peru by the National Institute of Culture.
