= Qulu Qulu =

Archaeological site in Peru

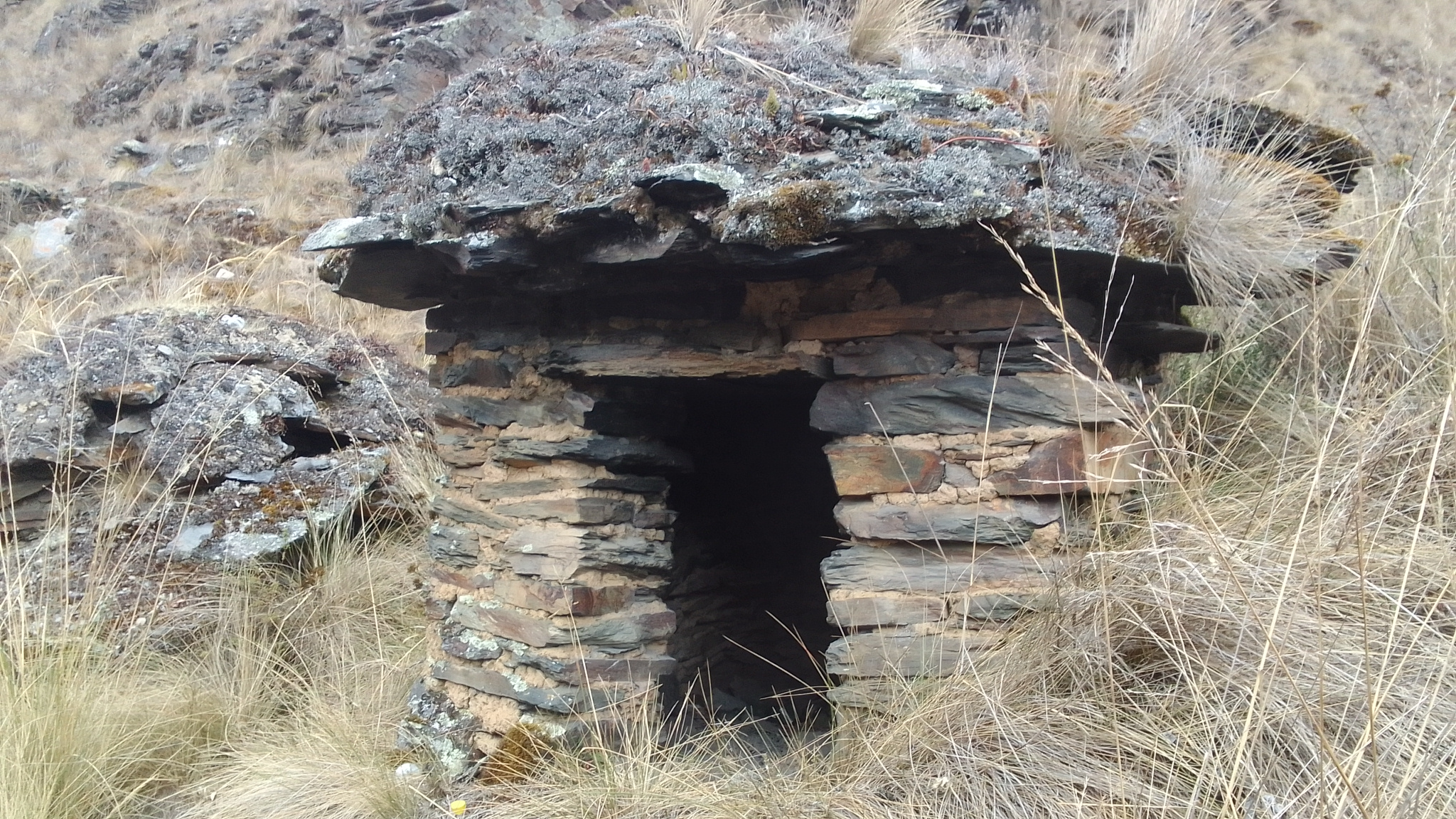

- Location within Peru
- 14.35469°S 69.62357°W
- Location: Peru, Puno Region, Sandia Province
- Region: Andes

Designations
- Designation: National Cultural Heritage (Patrimonio Cultural) of Peru

Qulu Qulu (Aymara qulu hump, little hill, the reduplication signifies there is a group or complex of something, "a complex of humps", Hispanicized spelling Colo Colo) is an archaeological site in Peru. It is located in the Puno Region, Sandia Province, Patambuco District. The site was declared a National Cultural Heritage (Patrimonio Cultural) of Peru by the National Institute of Culture.
