= Quilcapuncu District =

District in San Antonio de Putina Province, Peru

Quilcapuncu Quillqa Punku
- District
- Interactive map of Quilcapuncu
- Coordinates: 14.8941°S 69.7367°W
- Country: Peru
- Region: Puno
- Province: San Antonio de Putina
- Founded: November 26, 1986
- Capital: Quilcapuncu

Government
  - Mayor: Marino Catacora

Area
  - Total: 516.66 km^{2} (199.48 sq mi)
- Elevation: 3,910 m (12,830 ft)

Population (2007 census)
  - Total: 5,131
  - Density: 9.931/km^{2} (25.72/sq mi)
- Time zone: UTC−5 (PET)
- UBIGEO: 211004

Quilcapuncu District is one of five districts of the San Antonio de Putina Province in Peru.

== History ==
Quilcapuncu District was created in November 26, 1986, in Alan García's term.

== Geography ==
One of the highest peaks of the district is Usu at approximately 5,000 m (16,000 ft). Other mountains are listed below:

- Janq'u Qala
- Japu
- Kiswarani
- Kuntur Ikiña
- Kuntur Jaqhi
- Laramani
- Lawani
- Limani
- Lisa
- Mamanini
- Muru Urqu
- Pichaqani
- Pirwa Pirwani
- Pirwani
- Puka Kunka
- Putus Qullu
- Qillqa
- Qillwani
- Qutañani
- Q'illu
- Sapa Wisk'achani
- Silla Kunka
- Sura Pata
- Tira Pünqu
- Waka Tuqtu
- Waraq Qullu
- Wari Warini
- Wat'a
- Wayllani
- Wicha Kunka
- Wila Chaka
- Wila K'ark'a
- Yana Urqu

== Authorities ==
=== Mayors ===
- 2011–2014: Marino Catacora Ticona.
- 2007–2010: Leonardo Lipa Alvarez.

== Festivities ==
- May: Holy Cross
- June: Anthony of Padua.

== See also ==
- Administrative divisions of Peru
