= K'ayrani (Sandia) =

Mountain in Peru

- Location within Peru

Highest point
- Elevation: 4,600 m (15,100 ft)
- Coordinates: 14°30′06″S 69°24′19″W

Geography
- Location: Peru
- Parent range: Andes

K'ayrani (Aymara k'ayra frog, -ni a suffix to indicate ownership, "the one with a frog (or frogs)", also spelled Jairani) is a mountain north of the Apolobamba mountain range in the Andes of Peru, about 4,600-metre (15,092 ft) high. It is located in the Puno Region, Sandia Province, Quiaca District. Near K'ayrani there are various little lakes. The largest of them is Ch'uxñaquta ("green lake", Choccñacota, Chojñecota) in the southwest.
