= Sandia, Peru =

Coordinates: 14°14′S 69°26′W

Sandia
- Village
- Interactive map of Sandia
- Country: Peru
- Region: Puno
- Province: Sandia
- District: Sandia

Government
  - Mayor: Angel Mario Quispe Quispe
- Elevation: 2,178 m (7,146 ft)
- Time zone: UTC-5 (PET)

Sandia is a town in Southern Peru, capital of the province Sandia in the region Puno.
