= Alto Inambari District =

Coordinates: 14.0904°S 69.2432°W

Alto Inambari
- District
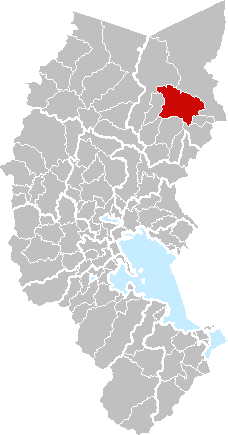
- Location of Alto Inambari in the Sandia province
- Country: Peru
- Region: Puno
- Province: Sandia
- Founded: September 13, 1994
- Capital: Massiapo

Government
  - Mayor: Juan Lipa Calla

Area
  - Total: 1,124.88 km^{2} (434.32 sq mi)
- Elevation: 1,340 m (4,400 ft)

Population (2005 census)
  - Total: 8,841
  - Density: 7.860/km^{2} (20.36/sq mi)
- Time zone: UTC-5 (PET)
- UBIGEO: 211209

Alto Inambari District is one of ten districts of the province Sandia in Peru.

== Ethnic groups ==
The people in the district are mainly indigenous citizens of Quechua descent. Quechua is the language which the majority of the population (63.65%) learnt to speak in childhood, 34.30% of the residents started speaking using the Spanish language (2007 Peru Census).
