= Yanahuaya District =

Coordinates: 14.2566°S 69.1730°W

Yanahuaya
- District
- Interactive map of Yanahuaya
- Country: Peru
- Region: Puno
- Province: Sandia
- Founded: April 23, 1962
- Capital: Yanahuaya

Government
  - Mayor: Ivan Rufino Calderon Bernal

Area
  - Total: 670.61 km^{2} (258.92 sq mi)
- Elevation: 1,550 m (5,090 ft)

Population (2005 census)
  - Total: 3,486
  - Density: 5.198/km^{2} (13.46/sq mi)
- Time zone: UTC-5 (PET)
- UBIGEO: 211208

Yanahuaya District is one of ten districts of the province Sandia in Peru.
