= Lake Veluyoc Cocha =

Lake in Puno, Peru

- Location within Peru
- Location: Peru, Puno Region
- Coordinates: 14°18′36″S 69°49′53″W
- Basin countries: Peru

Lake Veluyoc Cocha (possibly from Quechua wilu dry maize reed, -yuq a suffix to indicate ownership, qucha lake,) is a lake in the Andes of Peru. It is situated in the Puno Region, Carabaya Province, Crucero District. It lies southwest of the mountain Veluyoc Orjo and west of the mountain Aricoma and Lake Aricoma.
