= Wanakuni (Puno) =

Mountain in Peru

- Location within Peru

Highest point
- Elevation: 4,600 m (15,100 ft)
- Coordinates: 14°34′01″S 69°20′18″W

Geography
- Location: Peru
- Parent range: Andes

Wanakuni (Aymara wanaku, wanaqu guanaco, -ni a suffix to indicate ownership, "the one with the guanaco", Hispanicized spelling Huanacune) is a mountain in the northern extensions of the Apolobamba mountain range in Peru, about 4,600 metres (15,092 ft) high. It is situated in the Puno Region, Sandia Province, Quiaca District. Wanakuni lies northeast of Rit'ipata and Chapi.
