= Lake Aricoma =

Lake in Puno, Peru

- Location within Peru
- Location: Peru, Puno Region
- Coordinates: 14°19′35″S 69°48′46″W
- Basin countries: Peru

Lake Aricoma (possibly from Aymara for a variety of tuber (Smallanthus sonchifolius),) is a lake in the Andes of Peru. It is situated in the Puno Region, Carabaya Province, Crucero District. The lake lies west of the mountains Aricoma and Jalahuana, and east of the lake Veluyoc Cocha.
