= Riticunca =

Mountain in Peru

- Location within Peru

Highest point
- Elevation: 5,000 m (16,000 ft)
- Coordinates: 14°21′29″S 69°44′03″W

Geography
- Location: Peru
- Parent range: Andes

Riticunca (possibly from Quechua rit'i snow, kunka throat, "snow throat", also spelled Riticunca) is a mountain in the Andes of Peru, about 5,000 metres (16,404 ft) high. It is located in the Puno Region, Carabaya Province, Crucero District, and in the Sandia Province, Patambuco District, northwest of the mountain Laramani. East of Riticunca there is a group of small lakes, among them Riticocha ("snow lake", Rit'iqucha) and Yanacocha ("black lake", Yanaqucha). The lake Jochajucho is situated in the Ritipata valley southeast of the mountain.
