= Phara =

City in Ancient Greece

Coordinates: 38°38′19″N 20°36′21″E

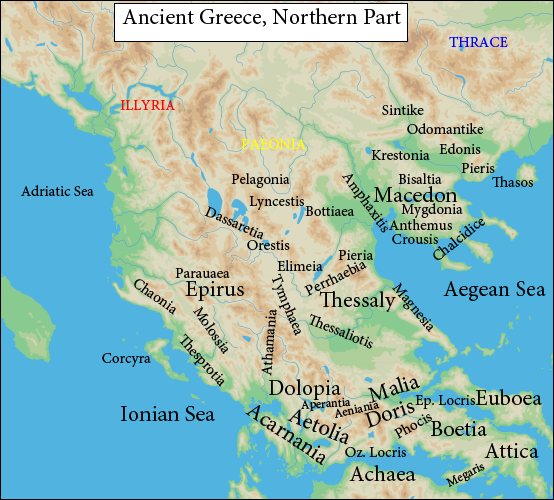
Phara is located in the region of Acarnania.

Phara (Ancient Greek: Φαρά) was an ancient Greek city located in the region of Acarnania.

== History ==
The only ancient source that mentions the city is the Periplus of Pseudo-Scylax, which lists the πὸλις (polis) Φαρά between Leukada and Ithaca. Hansen and Nielsen place it in Leukada and identify the settlement with the current Pyrgi. Others note that Pseudo-Scylax orders Phara after Leukada and if he had wanted to classify it as a Leukadian polis, he would have said the island had two poleis. Thus, Phara could be one of the small islands between Leukada and Ithaca or be located on the coast of Acarnania in the perea of Leukada. If this interpretation of the text of the Periplus of Pseudo-Scylax is accepted, it would have to be classified as an unlocated polis of Acarnania.

== See also ==
- List of cities in ancient Epirus

== Sources ==
- Hansen, Mogens Herman; Nielsen, Thomas Heine (2004). An Inventory of Archaic and Classical Poleis. Oxford and New York: Oxford University Press. ISBN 0198140991.
