= Liqiliqini (Peru) =

Mountain in Peru

- Location within Peru

Highest point
- Elevation: 4,600 m (15,100 ft)
- Coordinates: 14°32′05″S 69°24′24″W

Geography
- Location: Peru
- Parent range: Andes

Liqiliqini (Aymara liqiliqi, liqi liqi Southern lapwing or Andean lapwing, -ni a suffix to indicate ownership, "the one with the Southern lapwing (or Andean lapwing)", also spelled Lecceleccene, Lejelejene) is a mountain in the northern extensions of the Apolobamba mountain range in the Andes of Peru, about 4,600 m (15,100 ft) high. It is located in the Puno Region, Sandia Province, Quiaca District. It lies northeast of a mountain named Wilaquta.
