= Ancayoc Cucho =

Mountain in Peru

- Location within Peru

Highest point
- Elevation: 5,000 m (16,000 ft)
- Coordinates: 14°15′20″S 69°47′04″W

Geography
- Location: Peru, Puno Region
- Parent range: Andes

Ancayoc Cucho (possibly from Quechua anka black-chested buzzard-eagle or eagle, k'uchu corner, inside corner or outward angle, "corner with an eagle") is a mountain in the Andes of Peru, about 5,000 metres (16,404 ft) high. It is located in the Puno Region, Sandia Province, Limbani District.
