= Crucero =

- Interactive map of Crucero
- Coordinates: 40°25′07″S 72°47′17″W
- Region: Los Ríos
- Province: Ranco
- Municipality: Río Bueno
- Commune: Río Bueno

Government
  - Type: Municipal
  - Alcade: Luis Reyes Alvarez (UDI)
- Elevation: 106 m (348 ft)

Population (2002 census)
  - Total: 800
- Time zone: UTC−04:00 (Chilean Standard)
  - Summer (DST): UTC−03:00 (Chilean Daylight)
- Area code: Country + town = 56 + 63

Crucero is a village (Spanish: aldea) located between Bueno and Pilmaiquén River in Río Bueno commune, southern Chile.
