= La Rinconada, Peru =

Town in Puno, Peru

La Rinconada
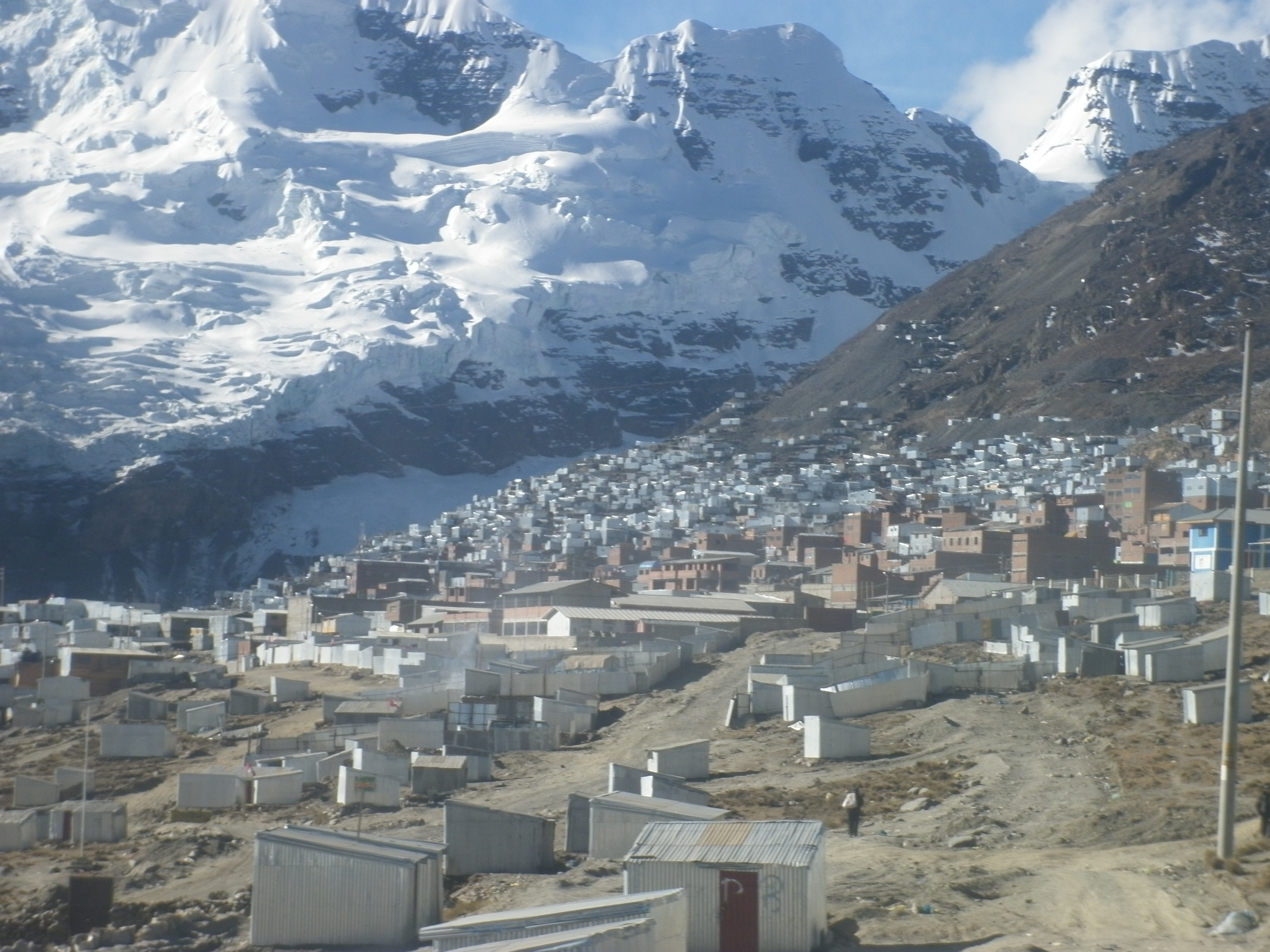

- Flag

- Location within Peru
- Coordinates: 14°37′57″S 69°26′45″W
- Country: Peru
- Region: Puno
- Province: San Antonio de Putina
- District: Ananea
- Elevation: 5,100 m (16,700 ft)

Population (2024)
  - Total: 29,678
- Demonym: Rinconero(a)
- Time zone: UTC-05:00 (PET)
- Postal code: 51

La Rinconada is a town in the Peruvian Andes near a gold mine. At up to 5,100 m (16,700 ft; 3.2 mi) above sea level, it is the highest larger permanent settlement in the world.

Between 2001 and 2009, the population was estimated by National Geographic to have increased to 30,000 people from a small gold prospector camp because the price of gold rose 235% over that period, although this number has not been reflected by the 2007 or 2017 censuses.

The town has gained notoriety for its extreme living conditions that include its high rates of altitude sickness, pollution, poverty, murder, and sex trafficking, and as a result has sometimes been referred to in Spanish as la ciudad sin ley del Perú, which means "the lawless city of Peru".

== Location ==
La Rinconada is a populated center, within the jurisdiction of Ananea District, in San Antonio de Putina Province, Puno Department, Peru. La Rinconada is located in the Janca region, according to the classification of Pulgar Vidal. According to the May 2003 issue of National Geographic magazine, La Rinconada is 5,100 meters above sea level, thus making it the highest-elevated permanent settlement in the world.

== Etymology ==
"La Rinconada" can translate to 'the corner' in Spanish.

== Geography ==
=== Topography ===
The town is in the Ananea District, San Antonio de Putina Province. The town lies at a height of 4,900 m (16,100 ft; 3.0 mi) to 5,100 m (16,700 ft; 3.2 mi) with the center at 5,000 m (16,000 ft; 3.1 mi) above sea level, on the side of Mount Ananea and at the foot of a glacier called Auchita, otherwise known as La Bella Durmiente (The Sleeping Beauty). Some successful miners in La Rinconada have homes in Juliaca, which has municipal services and is 3,825 m (12,549 ft; 2.377 mi) above sea level.

=== Climate ===
High in the Andes, La Rinconada has a tundra climate (ET, according to the Köppen climate classification), with no month having a mean temperature of 10 °C (50 °F) that would permit tree growth in the city. Above the tree line, La Rinconada is unique in its high elevation and population, with the highest city of comparable population (Nagqu) being over 500 m (1,600 ft; 0.31 mi) closer to sea level. Precipitation at La Rinconada is also heavily concentrated in the Southern Hemisphere summer.

Owing to the extreme elevation of the town, climatic conditions more closely resemble those of the west coast of Greenland than somewhere only 14° from the equator. The town has rainy summers and dry winters with a large diurnal variation seeing cool to cold days and freezing night time temperatures throughout the year, with snowfalls common. The average annual temperature in La Rinconada is 1.3 °C (34.3 °F) and the average annual precipitation is 707 mm (27.8 in).

Climate data for La Rinconada
Month	Jan	Feb	Mar	Apr	May	Jun	Jul	Aug	Sep	Oct	Nov	Dec	Year
Mean daily maximum °C (°F)	8.3 (46.9)	7.7 (45.9)	8.0 (46.4)	8.6 (47.5)	8.5 (47.3)	8.2 (46.8)	8.2 (46.8)	9.6 (49.3)	9.6 (49.3)	11.0 (51.8)	10.3 (50.5)	8.7 (47.7)	8.9 (48.0)
Daily mean °C (°F)	2.6 (36.7)	2.5 (36.5)	2.4 (36.3)	1.7 (35.1)	0.5 (32.9)	−1.7 (28.9)	−1.5 (29.3)	−0.4 (31.3)	1.3 (34.3)	2.5 (36.5)	2.4 (36.3)	2.7 (36.9)	1.3 (34.3)
Mean daily minimum °C (°F)	−3.1 (26.4)	−2.6 (27.3)	−3.2 (26.2)	−5.1 (22.8)	−7.5 (18.5)	−11.6 (11.1)	−11.2 (11.8)	−10.3 (13.5)	−7.0 (19.4)	−5.9 (21.4)	−5.5 (22.1)	−3.3 (26.1)	−6.4 (20.6)
Average precipitation mm (inches)	135 (5.3)	113 (4.4)	106 (4.2)	50 (2.0)	19 (0.7)	7 (0.3)	6 (0.2)	15 (0.6)	34 (1.3)	51 (2.0)	67 (2.6)	104 (4.1)	707 (27.7)
Source: Climate-data.org

== Population ==
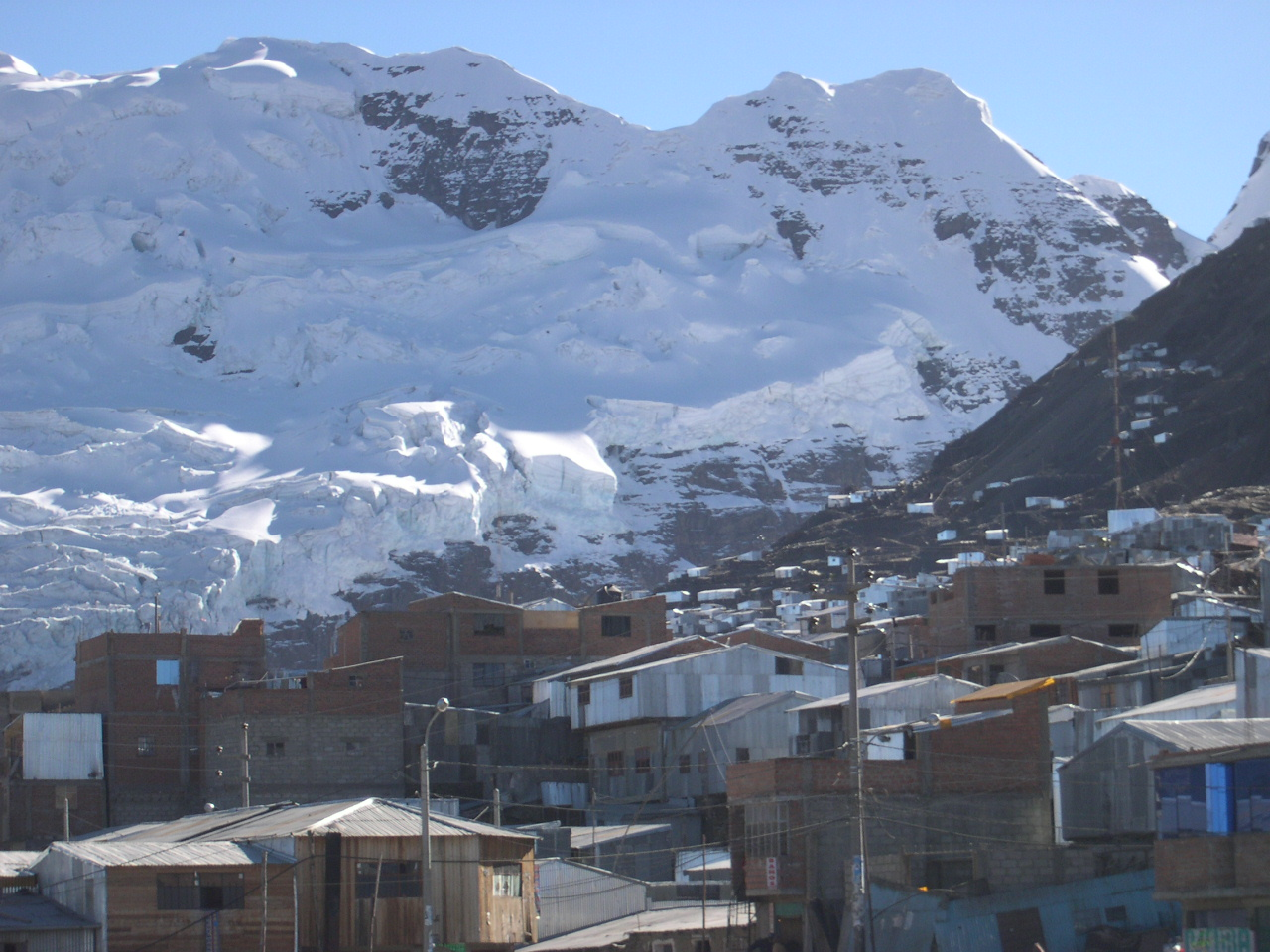
Houses of La Rinconada.

According to a report by National Geographic, the 235% increase in the price of gold between 2001 and 2009 swelled the local population, which reached 30,000 inhabitants in 2009. However, these numbers could be overestimated, since the 2007 National Census indicated the population of the Ananea District (which, to a large extent, is found in the La Rinconada settlement) was 20,572 people (16,907 classified as urban), and the 2017 National Census recorded 12,615 people (11,307 classified as urban). By comparison, the population of the Ananea District in 1981 was 2,707 people.

== Economy ==
La Rinconada's economy is mainly based on the extraction of gold, both legally and illegally, from nearby gold mines, mainly through artisanal mining.

After extraction, the gold is refined from small vendors to large companies like Metalor Technologies, which is one of the world's largest suppliers of precious metals. In March 2018, "Metalor accepted more than 40 kilos of gold (worth about $1.7 million) from a company outside La Rinconada that customs officials said in a report later that year that they could not find at the listed address." Metalor came under legal scrutiny by both the Peruvian and U.S. government for its involvement in illegal mining, exploitative labor practices, smuggling of gold, and drug gangs. Metalor supplies gold to major international companies including Apple and Samsung.

The only company with a governmental license to mine in La Rinconada is called Corporación Ananea, thus many miners work at the gold mine owned by Corporación Ananea. Under the cachorreo system, they work for 30 days without payment and for one day they are allowed to work for themselves. At this day of the month, the miners are allowed to take with them as much ore as they can carry on their shoulders. However, a miner stated "The problem is, though, that on the crucial day the men are usually sent to areas where there's nothing to find." Whether the ore contains any gold or not is a matter of luck. Pocketing of nuggets or promising chunks of rich ore is tolerated. This system sometimes ends with miners not being compensated for their work. While women are banned from working directly in the mines, pallaqueras, women who work on the outside of the mines, sift through what has been discarded hoping to find something of value. Due to the extreme working conditions and wageless hours, NGOs have described it as "modern day slavery".

In the Puno province, where La Rinconada is located, nearly 68% of the population lives below the poverty line. An article states that in addition to the extreme altitude's climate and oxygen impacts, residents live a "harsh reality marked by the lack of basic services, pollution and crime", citing that the settlement lacks clean water, sewage systems, and proper waste management, and noting that electricity only recently arrived in the 2000s, and that access to it still remains limited.

Inca Manco Cápac International Airport is the nearest commercial airport; it is located in Juliaca.

== Crime ==
The town has been an epicenter of many mining conflicts and murders. For this reason, it has sometimes been referred to in Spanish as "ciudad sin ley del Perú", meaning "lawless city of Peru". An article states that "many women, including minors, are victims of sexual exploitation in the region." Another article states that "in this region, gunshots [...] have become a constant occurrence. Although gold reigns here, it is an area plagued by poverty, crime, alcoholism and prostitution. The mortality rate is at alarming levels and life expectancy is low." Reuters reported that in 2019 in La Rinconada, "authorities reported they rescued at least 68 victims of human trafficking from slum nightclubs in the area. In April 2019, seven miners were found in a tunnel beneath the mountain with bullets in their heads." The Peruvian police estimates indicate that there are between 100 and 300 bars that operate as illegal brothels and that around 4,500 Peruvian, Bolivian and Colombian women arrived in La Rinconada under various forms of deception.

== Environmental and health issues ==
The town lacks plumbing and sanitation systems, and pollution from plastics and other types of trash is common due to a lack of government services.

Hypoxia is a significant health problem due to the low air pressure at such high altitude. Researchers estimate that at least 25% of residents have hypoxia.

There is also significant contamination by mercury of the drinking water and nearby glacier due to the mining practices. Local miners refine the ore by grinding and treating it with mercury and pressing the mass through a cloth to filter it. The resulting amalgam is heated to remove the mercury. There is only one small clinic located within the town. Environmentalists local to the region have been testing the rivers surrounding the mine. The area below the river had a very acidic pH of 4.5, whereas the Pataqueña river, upstream from the mine, had a pH of 8 – indicating pure, clean water. Richard Arpita Uchiri, a miner in La Rinconada for more than 10 years, stated that "the rain in La Rinconada is acidic with mercury." A local farmer stated in 2022 that, "The mine settled in 2006 and by 2009 our alpacas were starting to get sick. I used to have 80 alpacas and 56 sheep. Today I am left with 10 alpacas and 10 sheep." River communities downstream from the Coata river that flows from Rinconada to Lake Titicaca have been impacted by heavy metals significantly, impacting the river basin which includes the town Carata and Juliaca. The article states "Tests conducted on members of the local Carata community in 2018 by Peru's ministry of health showed that more than 83.5 percent had traces of heavy metal in their bodies." Another local farmer stated that "15 kilometres of the shore is polluted with trash, dead dogs, dead cows," and that some residents have developed diseases. As a result of heavy metal polluted waters, much of Coata's residents have left, as the soil has become salinated and infertile, making it impossible for crop growth and raising livestock.

The air is also contaminated with particles from mining. Dr. Nelson Hugo Gadea Vargas, chief medical officer for La Rinconada and nearby La Ananea stated that "[Miners] would enter the mine with a wet cloth that of course wasn't a good filter, and many of them in the end died of silicosis. When I used to carry out post mortems around 50–60 percent of the bodies had silicosis," which is a lung disease caused by inhalation of silica dust.
