= Lake Jochajucho =

Lake in Peru

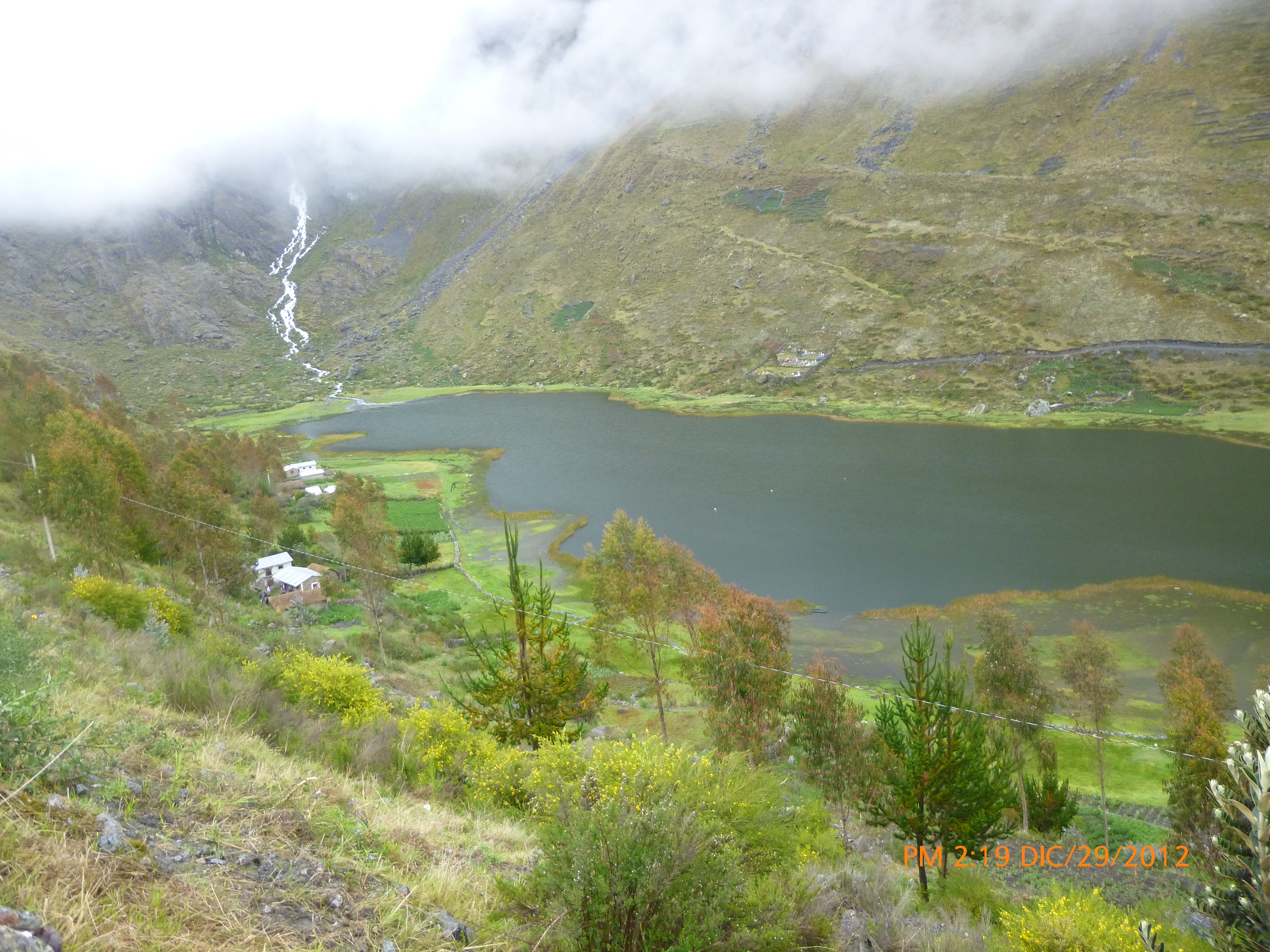

- Location within Peru
- Location: Peru; Puno Region
- Coordinates: 14°22′39″S 69°41′21″W

Lake Jochajucho (possibly from Quechua qucha lake, k'uchu corner, inside corner or outward angle) is a lake in Peru located in the Puno Region, Sandia Province, Patambuco District. Lake Jochajucho lies west of Patambuco, north-west of the village of Punayllu and north-east of the mountain Pacchapata.
