= Sandia province =

Coordinates: 14.248245°S 69.431019°W

Sandia
- Province
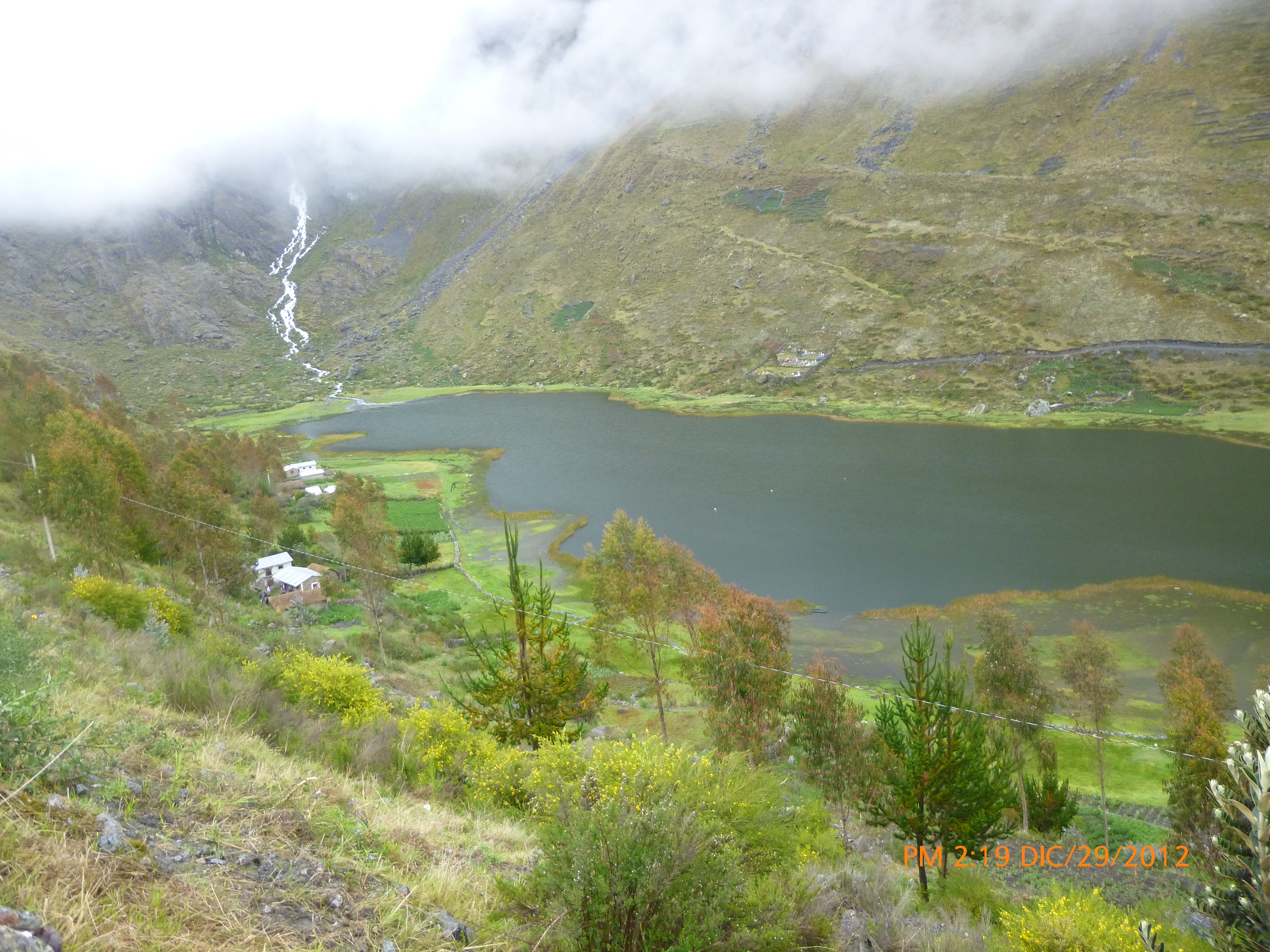
- The lake Quchak'uchu in the Parambuco District

- Coat of arms

- Location of Sandia in the Puno Region
- Country: Peru
- Region: Puno
- Capital: Sandia

Government
  - Mayor: Angel Mario Quispe Quispe

Area
  - Total: 11,862.41 km^{2} (4,580.10 sq mi)
- Elevation: 2,178 m (7,146 ft)

Population
  - Total: 65,431
  - Density: 5.5158/km^{2} (14.286/sq mi)
- UBIGEO: 2112
- Website: www.munisandia.gob.pe

Sandia is a province of the Puno Region in Peru. The capital of the province is the city of Sandia.

== Geography ==
The Apolobamba mountain range traverses the province. Some of the highest mountains of the province are listed below:

- Achu Achu
- Ankayuq K'uchu
- Ariquma
- Chimpa Kiswarani
- Chuqichampi
- Ch'uxñaquta
- Hatun Pinkilluni
- Hatun Wayq'u
- Huch'uy Pinkilluni
- Janq'u Qala
- Janq'u Uma
- Kimsa Chata
- Kuntur Ikiña
- Kunturini
- K'ark'a Chunta
- K'ayrani
- Laramani
- Liqiliqini
- Machu Llaqta
- Pinkilluni
- Puka Pukayuq
- Pukara
- Qala Qala
- Qaqa Wasi
- Qaqinkurani
- Qayqu Tira
- Qurwari
- Q'alawaña
- Rit'i Chaki
- Rit'i K'uchu
- Rit'ikunka
- Rit'ipata
- Saywani
- Suk'a Suk'a
- Surapata
- Surapata Urqu
- Utkhuqaqa
- Wanakuni
- Warachani
- Wila Saltu
- Wirta Pata
- Yana Urqu

== Political division ==
The province measures 11,862.41 square kilometres (4,580.10 sq mi) and is divided into ten districts:

District	Mayor	Capital	Ubigeo
Alto Inambari	Juan Lipa Calla	Massiapo	211209
Cuyocuyo	Zacarias Santamaria Paye	Cuyocuyo	211202
Limbani	Percy Fermin Soncco Quispe	Limbani	211203
Patambuco	Angel Silvestre Ochoa Colque	Patambuco	211204
Phara	Alfredo Paredes Meza	Phara	211205
Quiaca	Concepcion Mamani Condori	Quiaca	211206
San Juan del Oro	Cesar Zegarra Lipa	San Juan del Oro	211207
San Pedro de Putina Punco	Ernesto Yujra Enriquez	Putina Punco	211210
Sandia	Angel Mario Quispe Quispe	Sandia	211201
Yanahuaya	Ivan Rufino Calderon Bernal	Yanahuaya	211208

== Ethnic groups ==
The people in the province are mainly indigenous citizens of Aymara and Quechua descent. Quechua is the language which the majority of the population (53.86%) learnt to speak in childhood, 35.51% of the residents started speaking using the Spanish language and 10.49% using Aymara (2007 Peru Census).

== See also ==
- Mawk'allaqta
- Quchak'uchu
- Qulu Qulu
