= Jorhuari =

Mountain in Peru

- Location within Peru

Highest point
- Elevation: 5,200 m (17,100 ft)
- Coordinates: 14°35′26″S 69°29′00″W

Geography
- Location: Peru
- Parent range: Andes, Apolobamba

Jorhuari or Ccorhuari (possibly from Aymara for mold) is a mountain in the Apolobamba mountain range in the Andes of Peru, about 5,200 metres (17,060 ft) high. It is located in the Puno Region, Putina Province, Ananea District, and in the Sandia Province, Cuyocuyo District. It lies southwest of the mountain Vilacota.
