= Vilacota (Sandia) =

Mountain in Peru

- Location within Peru

Highest point
- Elevation: 5,179 m (16,991 ft)
- Coordinates: 14°34′56″S 69°25′45″W

Geography
- Location: Peru, Puno Region
- Parent range: Andes, Apolobamba

Vilacota (possibly from Aymara wila red, blood, quta lake, "red lake") is a 5,179-metre-high (16,991 ft) mountain in the Apolobamba mountain range in the Andes of Peru. It is located in the Puno Region, Sandia Province, in the districts Cuyocuyo and Quiaca. Vilacota is situated northwest of the mountain Ananea and northeast of Jorhuari.
