= Aricoma =

Mountain in Peru

- Location within Peru

Highest point
- Elevation: 5,350 m (17,550 ft)
- Coordinates: 14°18′43″S 69°47′00″W

Geography
- Location: Peru
- Parent range: Andes

Aricoma (possibly from in the Aymara spelling Ariquma for a variety of tuber (Smallanthus sonchifolius),) is a mountain in the Andes of Peru, about 5,350 metres (17,552 ft) high. It is located in the Puno Region, Carabaya Province, Crucero District, and in the Sandia Province, Limbani District. The mountain lies east of Aricoma Lake and northwest of Jalahuana.
