= LGBTQ slang =

Slang used mostly among LGBTQ people

LGBTQ slang, LGBTQ speak or queer slang are English slang lexicon used predominantly among the LGBTQ community in order to identify themselves quickly and secretly. It has been used in various languages since the early 20th century.

LGBTQ slang has played an integral part in LGBTQ culture for decades. Slang language initially emerged as a way for queer people to communicate with one another while avoiding detection by mainstream society. Queer people have always existed, but historically, they have had to be discreet about their identities, particularly in places and times when being LGBTQ was illegal and/or socially condemned.

LGBTQ slang is used as a way to signal one's identity and build solidarity among the community. When queer people use these certain words and phrases, they demonstrate to others that they are part of the LGBTQ community and share a common experience. This connection can create a sense of belonging for those historically rejected and isolated people.

LGBTQ slang is also used for reclaiming language and deconstructing oppressive norms. Queer slang often includes playful references to sexual acts, which can serve as an assertion of sexual agency and a rejection of shame.

== History and context ==
Because of sodomy laws and the criminalization of homosexuality, LGBTQ slang has served as an argot or cant, a secret way for the LGBTQ community to communicate with each other publicly without revealing their identities to others. Since the advent of queer studies in universities, LGBTQ slang has become a subject of academic research among linguistic anthropology scholars.

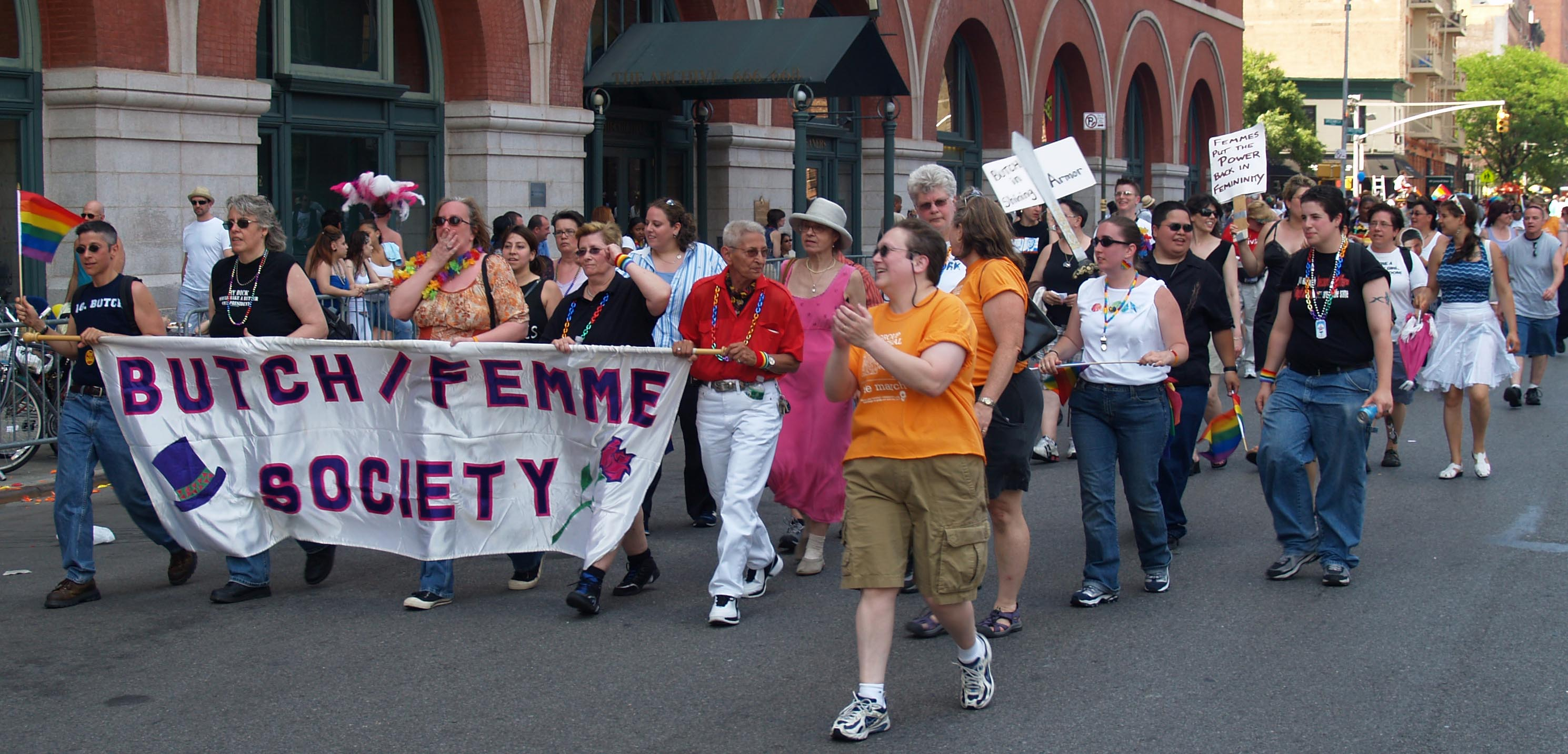
The Butch and Femme Society

During the first seven decades of the 20th century, a specific language called Polari was developed by gay men and lesbians in urban areas of the United Kingdom within established LGBTQ communities. Polari was featured on the BBC radio programme Round the Horne in 1964, exposing the wider public to the secret language. Much of contemporary British gay slang was founded from Polari and still utilizes many of its words. The 1964 legislative report Homosexuality and Citizenship in Florida contains an extensive appendix documenting and defining the homosexual slang in the United States at that time. SCRUFF launched a gay-slang dictionary app in 2014, which includes commonly used slang in the United States from the gay community. Specialized dictionaries that record LGBTQ slang have been found to revolve heavily around sexual matters.

Slang is ephemeral; terms used in one generation may move out of usage in another. For example, in the 1960s and 1970s, the terms "cottage" (chiefly British) and "tearoom" (chiefly American) were used to denote public toilets used for sex. By 1999, this terminology had fallen out of use to the point of being greatly unrecognizable by members of the LGBTQ community at large.

Many terms that originated as gay slang have become part of the popular lexicon. The word drag was first used by William Dorsey Swann, a freed African American slave. Swann referred to himself as the "queen of drag" in the 1880s and 1890s. Drag was later popularized by Hubert Selby Jr. in his book Last Exit to Brooklyn. Drag has been traced back by the Oxford English Dictionary (OED) to the late 19th century. Conversely, words such as "banjee", while well-established in a subset of gay society, have never made the transition to popular use. Conversations between gay men have been found to use more slang and fewer commonly known terms about sexual behavior than conversations between straight men.

In the Philippines, many LGBTQ people speak with Swardspeak, or "gay lingo", which is a more extensive form of dialect. Other argots are spoken in southern Africa (Gayle language and IsiNgqumo) and Indonesia (Bahasa Binan). In a country like Thailand, LGBTQ slang has always been present due to their religious, behavioral, and social norms. Before the term LGBTQ was introduced, the Thai community would use the terms Kathoey and Tom. The term Kathoey was used to describe transgender women who dress, act, or partake in surgery to become female, and the term Tom, as well as "handsome girls", in Thai was used to describe women who liked women. Homosexuality and transgender people have always existed throughout history, which lead to the use of slang and secrecy since their identities did not align with heterosexual norms.

== General slang terms ==
- 100-footer – an obviously gay or lesbian person (as if visible from 100 feet away) (US)
- Achillean or MLM (man-loving-man) – an umbrella term for attractions and relationships between men, regardless of their sexual or romantic orientation, sometimes including non-binary androphiles. Sometimes known as Vincian, referencing the sexuality of Leonardo da Vinci, or Uranian
- baths – bathhouses frequented by gay men for sexual encounters (US)
- beach bitch – a gay man who frequents beaches and resorts for sexual encounters (US)
- beard – a person used as a date, romantic partner, or spouse to conceal one's sexual orientation
- beat – an area frequented by gay men, where sexual acts occur (Australia)
- bent – gay, as opposed to straight (UK)
- bender – someone who has homosexual intercourse (UK)
- binding – a technique in which individuals wear tight clothing, bandages, or compression garments, known as binders, to hide and flatten their breasts
- bottom – a receptive partner in intercourse; also used as a verb for the state of receiving sexual stimulation
  - power bottom – someone who dominantly or energetically plays the receptive role in intercourse
- bussy – portmanteau of "boy pussy"; a male anus, in the context of anal sex. Also used to refer to a trans man's vulva
- butch queen – in ball culture, a gay male who presents as a gay male; that is, neither as a trans individual nor a heteronormative male. This mostly refers to someone who looks the part of what most would identify as "gay"
- butchy femme – a gender expression between femme and futch
- camp, campy – exaggerated and amusing, in a way that is typically associated with gay men or femininity
- clone – a San Francisco or New York Greenwich Village denizen with exaggerated macho behavior and appearance (US)
- closeted – keeping one's sexuality or gender identity a secret from others
- cocksucker – a person who practices fellatio, usually a gay male
- come out (of the closet) – to admit or publicly acknowledge oneself as non-heterosexual/non-cisgender
- cottaging – having or seeking anonymous gay sex in a public toilet, or "cottage" (UK)
- cruising – seeking a casual gay sex encounter (historically from ancient Rome)
- down-low – homosexual or bisexual activity, kept secret, by men who have sex with men (US)
- en femme, en homme – the act of wearing clothes stereotypically of the opposite sex
- femboy – a male who presents in a traditionally feminine manner
- femme – a feminine homosexual
- folx – a shorter alternative to folks
- futch – a gender expression between femme and butch, or a feminine butch
- Game of Flats – an 18th-century English term for sex between women
- gaydar – the supposed ability to detect someone's sexual orientation (from gay + radar). Corresponding terms include lesdar, bidar, transdar, and queerdar
- gaymer – an LGBTQ person who plays video games (from gay + gamer)
- gaysian – a gay Asian person
- girlfag – a woman that mostly or exclusively associates with gay/bisexual men. May also mean a woman attracted to gay/bisexual men, also may refer to some gay men or non-binary people
- fag hag – a heterosexual woman who mostly or only associates with gay/bisexual men
- fag stag – a heterosexual man who mostly or only associates with gay/bisexual men
- fruit fly – person of any gender/sexuality that heavily associates with any LGBTQ-aligned person or community. A fruit fly may also refer to a gay man without any connotations of association
- gold star – a homosexual who has never had heterosexual sexual intercourse
- gouinage (Brazil) – non-penetrative sex. Named after gouine, similar to side
- g0y – a man attracted to men who does not identify as gay or bisexual and is not willing to do anal intercourse
- guydyke or lesboy – a man/boy attracted to lesbian/bisexual women, also may be used to refer to a non-binary person
- heteroflexible – to be mostly heterosexual
- homoflexible – to be mostly gay
- molly – In 18th century England, the term "molly" was used for male homosexuals, implying effeminacy. See Molly house
- outsider – being "neither/nor" when it comes to normative taboos and self-centered communities
- platinum star – (see 'gold star' above) a gay man who was born by a C-section procedure and who has never had sex with a woman. Originating from a joke in Will and Grace but has taken on non-comedic connotations
- poz – HIV-positive person (US)
- queer – originally a slur against homosexuals, transgender people, and anyone who does not fit society's standards of gender and sexuality; later reclaimed and used as umbrella term for sexual and gender minorities
- sapphic or WLW (woman-loving-woman) – used to encompass attractions and relationships between women, regardless of their sexual or romantic orientation, sometimes including non-binary gynephiles
- scissoring – used to refer to lesbian intercourse, though is often derogatory
- side – a homosexual male who does not enjoy anal penetration (giving or receiving), but will engage in other forms of same-sex activity (fellatio, frottage, handjobs, etc.)
- slay – especially in ball culture to dress or be fashionable and flawless
- swish – effeminate or effeminacy (US)
- switch – a person who enjoys both topping and bottoming, or being dominant and submissive, and may alternate between the two in sexual situations, adapting to their partner. Synonymous with vers
- tomgirl – the equivalent of a tomboy, but for boys with feminine traits
- top – the dominant or inserting sexual partner, usually in a homosexual relation or activity
  - service top – a submissive top, someone who applies sensation or control to a bottom, but does so at the bottom's explicit instructions
- tongzhi (同志, "comrade", lit. "same will, same purpose") – a term used to describe members of LGBTQ communities in some Chinese languages
- trade – a straight-passing male partner, commonly used by gay men or trans women (derived from Polari) (US)
  - also used as slang to indicate the action of "trading" pictures of penises, commonly used on social media
- vers – short for "versatile," a person who enjoys both topping and bottoming, or being dominant and submissive, and may alternate between the two in sexual situations, adapting to their partner

== Terms describing gay men ==
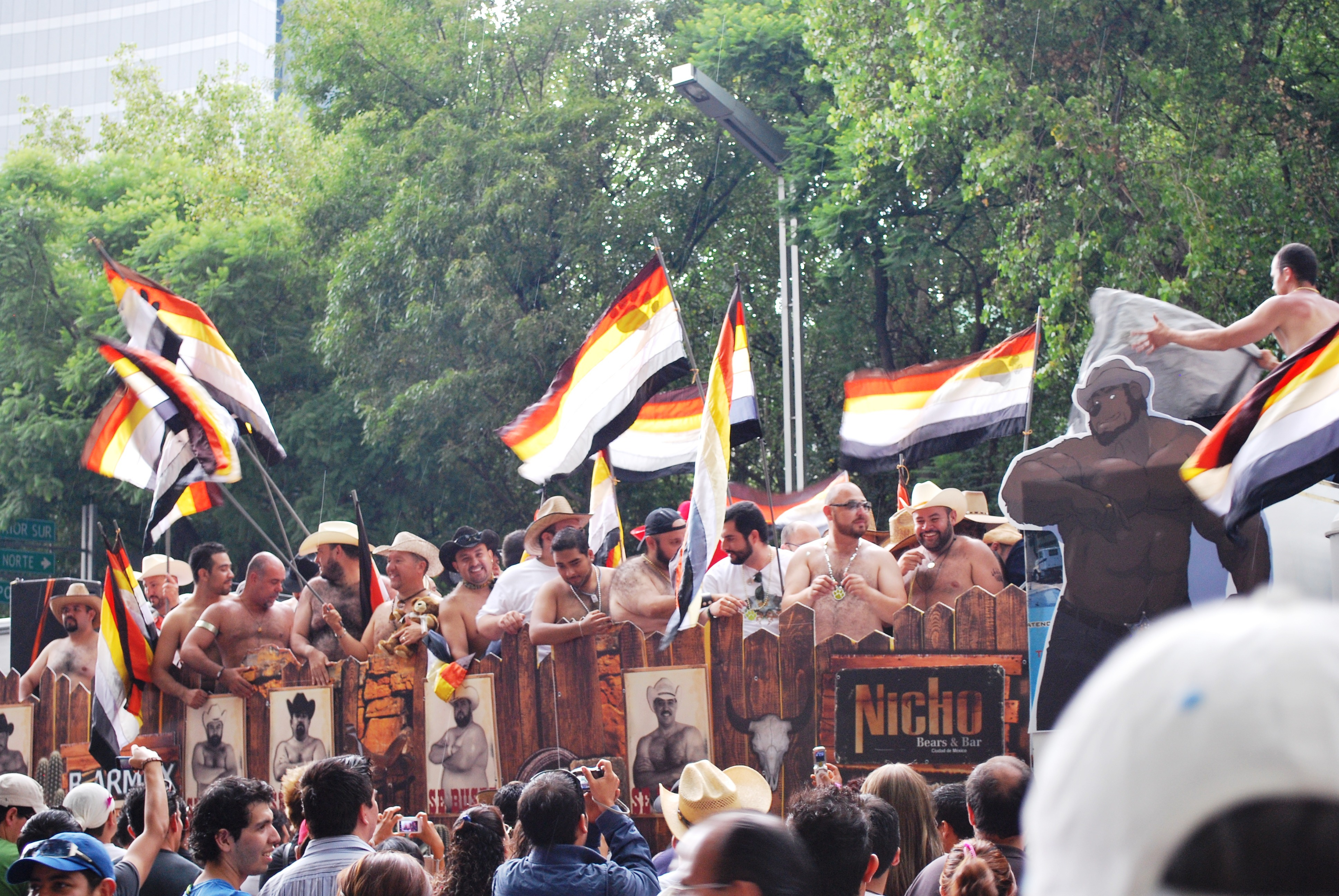
Bears at the 2009 Marcha Gay in Mexico City

- artiste – a gay man who excels at fellatio
- auntie – an older, often effeminate and gossipy gay man
- bathsheba – a gay man who frequents gay bathhouses
- bull queer – a gay man who exclusively tops in intercourse
- butch – a hypermasculine man
- chicken – a youthful gay man
- chubby chaser – a man who seeks overweight males
- daddy – a typically older gay man
- flit
- flower – a typically effeminate gay man
- friend of Dorothy – a gay person. Historically used as a shibboleth to identify other LGBTQ people. Likely a reference to Judy Garland, who portrayed Dorothy in The Wizard of Oz (1939) and had a large gay fan-base
- light in the loafers / light in the pants / light in the fedora
- punk – a smaller, younger gay man who, in prison settings, is forced into a submissive role and used for the older inmate's sexual pleasure
- queen – a flamboyant or effeminate gay man. Alternatively, short for drag queen
  - bean queen (also taco queen or Salsa queen), gay man attracted to Hispanic men
  - brownie queen – obsolete slang for gay man interested in anal sex (used by men who disliked anal sex)
  - chicken queen – an older gay man interested in younger or younger appearing men
  - grey queen – a gay person who works in financial services; grey flannel suits
  - potato queen – a gay Asian man attracted mainly to white men
  - rice queen – a gay man attracted mainly to East Asian men
- sticky rice - a gay Asian man attracted exclusively to other Asian men
- twink − a youthful, flamboyant gay man with a slim physique

=== Slurs against gay men ===
- anal assassin (UK) or "anal astronaut"
- arse bandit or ass bandit
- backgammon player (late 18th century Britain)
- batty boy – a slur for gay or effeminate man (Jamaica and United Kingdom)
- bent, bentshot or bender
- bixa/bicha (Brazil)
- brownie king / brown piper
- bufter, bufty (mainly Scottish) or booty buffer
- bum boy / bum chum, also bum robber
- butt pirate, butt boy, butt rider, butt pilot, or butt rustler
- chi chi man (Jamaica and the Caribbean)
- cockstruction worker – a gay, bi or queer man who works in construction industry
- faggot / fag – slur against gay men. First recorded in a Portland, Oregon publication in 1914
- fairy – a slur, common in the 1920s and 1930s, reclaimed by gay men in the 1960s
- faygele (lit. 'little bird') – a Yiddish word used as a pejorative term for a gay man (see Faggot#Etymology).
- finocchio (from Italy, meaning fennel)
- flamer
- fruit (also fruit loop, fruit packer, butt fruit) – a slur against gay men; originally a stereotype of gay men as "softer" and "smelling good"
- fudge packer
- homo – shortening of homosexual, it is sometimes derogatory, though also used in a reclaimed sense by some LGBTQ people
- homo thug
- maricón or marica (in Spanish)
- nancy boy
- nelly / nellie – an effeminate gay man
- pansy
- poof/poofta/poofter (Commonwealth)
- sod (from sodomy)
- uphill gardener
- viado or veado – a gay male or an effeminate man (lit., a corrupted form of "deer", derived from desviado, meaning deviant) (Brazil)

== Terms describing lesbians ==
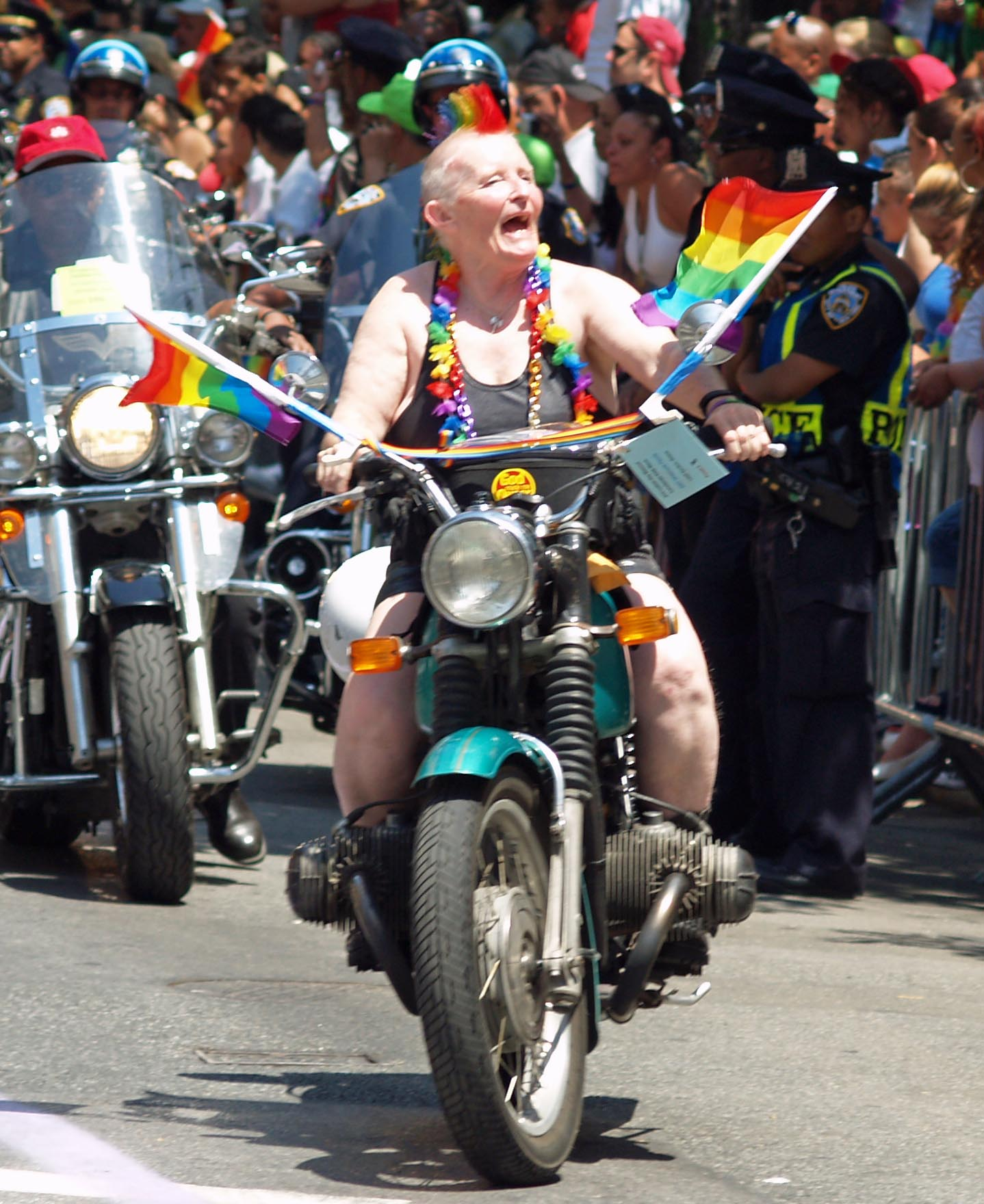
A member of the Dykes on Bikes motorcycle club

- baby butch – a young, boyish lesbian
- baby dyke – a young or recently out lesbian
- bambi lesbian – a lesbian who prefers cuddles, hugs, kisses, and other affectionate and sensual non-sexual acts over sexual acts
- bean flicker – likening the clitoris to a bean
- bluff – butch fluff
- boi – a boyish lesbian (UK)
- boydyke – a lesbian with male presentation
- bull dyke – a masculine lesbian, as opposed to a baby butch or dinky dyke (UK (somewhat archaic), US)
- butch – a masculine lesbian
  - long-haired butch (LHB) – a butch with long hair
- carpet muncher (or "rug muncher")
- dyke ("bull dyke", "bull dagger", alternatively "bulldagger", "bulldicker"), from 1920s black American slang. A slur reclaimed by women who are attracted to women in the 1950s
  - diesel dyke
  - drag dyke
- dykon – portmanteau of dyke + icon. A celebrity woman who is seen as an icon by lesbians; may or may not be a lesbian herself
- fluff – femme
- gouine (in French)
- hasbian / has-bian – a woman who previously identified as lesbian but now identifies as heterosexual or bisexual
- kiki – a term used primarily from the 1940s until the 1960s to indicate a lesbian who was not butch or femme and did not have a preference for either butch or femme partners
- kitty puncher / pussy puncher – with both "kitty" and "pussy" referring to a woman's vulva/vagina, and "puncher" as a variation on various derogatory terms for gay men, such as "donut puncher"
- four-year lesbian – see lesbian until graduation
- lesbian until graduation (LUG) – a young woman who is assumed to be temporarily experimenting with same-sex behavior, but will ultimately adopt a heterosexual identity
- lipstick lesbian – a lesbian/bisexual woman who displays historically feminine attributes such as wearing make-up, dresses, and high heels
- muff-diver – a lesbian
- pillow princess or pillow queen – a lesbian who likes to receive sexual stimulation, rather than giving it (to bottom)
- sapatão (Brazil) or fufa (Portugal)
- soft butch – an androgynous lesbian, in between femme and butch
- stem, stemme – someone whose gender expression falls somewhere between a stud and a femme
- stone butch – a very masculine lesbian, or a butch lesbian who does not receive touch during intercourse, only giving (US)
- stud – a Black butch

== Terms describing bisexual or pansexual people ==
- AC/DC – reference to "swinging both ways" (US)
- ambisextrous – euphemism for bisexual, derived from ambidextrous
- bicon – portmanteau of bisexual + icon. Used to refer to a bisexual celebrity
- byke – a bisexual dyke
- equal-opportunity lover – informal term for bisexual
- Gillette Blade – a 1950s era term for bisexual women, whose sexuality "cuts both ways"
- Horatian – in Lord Byron's circle at Cambridge, a code word for "bisexual", more specifically bisexual men
- mapero – A Peruvian slang that originated in the Indigenous Amazonian communities, and is used by cisgender men and some men who have sex with men to refer to themselves.
- unicorn – a bisexual, usually a woman, who desires multiple partners and is willing to join an existing couple and sexually satisfy both members of the couple. So-named because bisexuals willing to enter such an arrangement are considered rare or non-existent, while couples seeking such a partner ("unicorn hunters") are common

== Terms describing androgynous or intersex people ==
- futanari (ふたなり, "to be of two kinds"; seldom: 二形, 双形, lit. "dual form") – Japanese word for hermaphroditism, which is also used in a broader sense for androgyny. The term is also heavily associated with a genre of hentai defined by sexualization of characters simultaneously possessing breasts, a penis and a vulva, and has gained a negative connotation for the sexual connotations
- hermie – an androgynous or intersex person, though the term is often considered a slur
- altersex – a term describing people who alter their sex, such as through hormone replacement therapy or gender-affirming surgery, who were not born intersex. This term is especially used in the case of people who do not describe their sex as male or female due to their medical transition, without appropriating intersex terminology. Considered derogatory if used to deny the validity of someone's medical transition to male or female
- Salmacian – named after Salmacis, standing for someone who acquires, or wishes to acquire, mixed genitalia

== Terms describing transgender and non-binary people ==
- baby trans – a trans person who recently came out of the closet. The term is a noun
- boymoder – a transgender woman or girl who socially presents in a masculine gender role, typically in places where transgender individuals are discriminated against, or due to not being out as transgender. The equivalent for a transgender man is "girlmoder"
- cisn't – similar to trans*, an umbrella term for non-cisgender people
- Copenhagen capon – a transsexual; someone who has undergone sex reassignment surgery. The term alludes to Christine Jorgensen, a trans woman who underwent sex reassignment surgery in Copenhagen in the 1950s. A capon is a neutered rooster
- diamoric – a term for attractions and relationships involving at least one non-binary individual
- egg – a transgender person who has not yet realized they are trans; used by transgender people when aspects of one's personality or behavior remind them of gender-related aspects of themselves before they realized they were trans. As such, the realization that one is trans is referred to as one's "egg cracking". This is also used less often to refer to someone who is questioning their gender but later expresses themselves to be cisgender. Statements of this kind either refer to someone's past self, before they would describe themselves as transgender, or to someone believed to be trans, but not open, regardless of whether they say they are at the time.
- enbian or NBLNB (also NLN) – a term for attraction and relationship between non-binary people
- enby – a non-binary person. Derived from a phonetic spelling of the abbreviation NB.
- girlmoder – a transgender man who socially presents in a feminine gender role, typically in places where transgender individuals are discriminated against, or due to not being out as transgender. The equivalent for a transgender woman is "boymoder"
- lady boy – English translation of kathoey, similar or equivalent to transgender woman, but may refer to feminine gay men or intersex people
- M2B – male to butch, alluding male-to-female (MtF, also called M2F)
- repressor – a person who is fighting the wish to change their gender expression
- sapatrans or sapatrava (portmanteau of sapatão + trans) – a term used in Brazil for trans lesbians and lesbian travestis
- t-girl – a trans woman (short for "trans girl"). It is sometimes derogatory due to its association with transgender pornography. The trans man equivalent is t-boy.
- t-boy / t-guy – a trans man (short for "trans boy" or "trans guy") The trans women equivalent is t-girl.
- tranarchist – a transgender anarchist
- transbian (portmanteau of trans + lesbian) – a transgender lesbian. See also Trans woman § Sexuality.
- transfag – a transgender gay man
- tryke (portmanteau of trans + dyke) — a transgender lesbian

=== Slurs against transgender and non-binary people ===
- shemale or she-male – a trans woman with male genitalia and possibly female secondary sex characteristics. Primarily a term used in pornography and often derogatory
- hon – a non-passing transgender woman. This term is primarily used by trans women in online communities (mostly 4chan). It is derogatory
- tranny – slur for transgender people
- trap — slur for someone whose perceived gender is opposite their anatomical sex, particularly a trans woman or feminine boy. Implies that others who are attracted to them (typically heterosexual men) are maliciously deceived (i.e. "trapped") regarding their "real" gender. It is considered derogatory and dehumanizing
- troon (portmanteau of "trans" and "goon") — Originally a term for members of the Something Awful forum ("goons") who are transgender. Used as a slur for trans women, connoting violent or sinister ulterior motives for transitioning
- cuntboy or pussyboy/dickgirl – a female-to-male (FtM) and male-to-female (MtF) transgender/transsexual person, respectively, who has not had genital surgery. It is often used in a derogatory or pornographic context
- pooner – a derogatory term originating from 4chan describing trans men who do not pass well as male

== Terms related to transgender and non-binary people ==
- clock – to recognize someone as being transgender
- deadname – as a noun, a transgender person's birth name. As a verb, to refer to someone by their deadname. The etymologically identical term necronym is also sometimes used with the same meaning
- girldick – a transfeminine person's penis, especially one changed by hormone use. Also known as gick, girlcock, or gock
- malefail – to be gendered as feminine when trying to present in a masculine gender role
- packing – the act of wearing padding or a phallic object to present the appearance of a penis
- tuck - any attempt to hide the appearance of a penis bulge
- passing – to be perceived as a gender one is attempting to pass as, usually in relation to trans people
- skoliosexual – to describe attraction to non-binary people
- stealth – passing to the extent that most people cannot tell that you are trans
- TERF – acronym for "trans-exclusionary radical feminist"; a feminist whose advocacy excludes or opposes the rights of trans people. It also, more infrequently, used to refer to someone hostile to transgender people
- TME or TMA/TMC – transmisogyny-exempt or transmisogyny-affected/confined, ascribing those who are, or are not, a target of transmisogyny, the intersection of transphobia and misogyny
- transgenderism – an anti-trans term used against transgender people by saying that being transgender is an ideology or a mental disorder rather than an identity. In the past (the mid to late 20th century), the term was used non-derogatorily to refer to being transgender, though this meaning has become obsolete

== Terms describing cisgender or heterosexual people ==
- breeder – a heterosexual person, especially one with children
- cisbian (portmanteau of cis + lesbian) – a cisgender lesbian
- cishet – someone who is cisgender and heterosexual and/or heteroromantic
- cisqueer – someone who is cisgender and queer, such as cis lesbians, cis gay men, and cis bisexuals
- chaser – someone attracted to transgender people who value them for their trans status alone, rather than being attracted to them as a person
- fag hag – a heterosexual woman who specifically associates with gay men
- fag stag – heterosexual man who enjoys company of gay men

== Terms describing asexual or aromantic people ==
- ace – short for asexual
- asexy – asexual + sexy
- aro – short for aromantic
- aroace, aro-ace, aro/ace – both aromantic and asexual
- ace of spades – an aromantic asexual
- ace of hearts – a romantic asexual
- SAM – split attraction model – a model that sexual and romantic orientation can be split, often used within the aromantic and asexual community
- squish – a non-romantic or platonic version of crush
- queerplatonic relationship – committed intimate relationships which are not romantic nor (necessarily) sexual in nature
- zucchini – queerplatonic partner

== LGBTQ subgroups ==
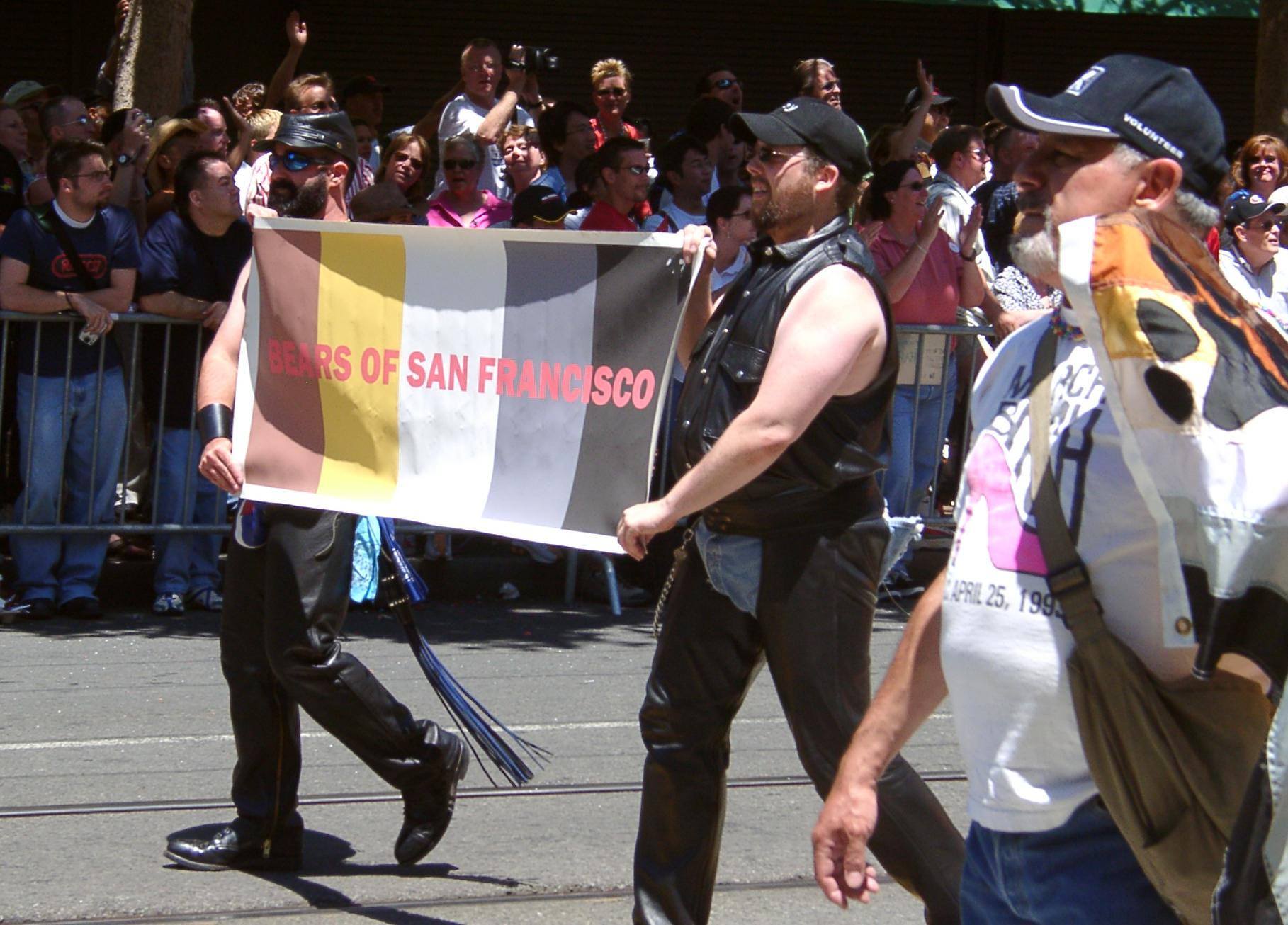
Bears marching in San Francisco's pride parade in 2004

The following slang terms have been used to represent various types of people within the LGBTQ community:

- bear – a larger and often hairier man. The bear subgroup is among the oldest and largest of the LGBTQ community. Pride.com states "Bears are on the heavier side, either muscular, beefy, or chunky. They wouldn't dream of shaving their body hair (which comes in abundance) and they usually have a full beard to match." Attitude magazine describes bears as "typically older" with a big build, a belly, and lots of hair. There are many bear 'subtypes', including the black bear (Black or African American men), the brown bear (Hispanic men), the grizzly bear ("dominant bears of extreme stature or hairiness"), the koala bear (Australian men), the panda bear (men of Asian descent), and the polar bear, which represents an older bear with white hair
  - cub – a younger bear. Pride.com describes cubs as "baby bears" or "large, hairy guys in their teens and 20s who are on their way to becoming a bear"
  - bear chaser – a man who pursues bears
  - otter – a man who is slender and hairy
  - wolf – Pride.com says, "Similar to an otter, a wolf has some hair and is in between a twink and a bear. However, there are some key differences between wolves and otters. Wolves typically have a lean, muscular build and are sexually aggressive." Attitude says wolves are "typically older and masculine" with a "muscular/athletic build"
- bull – Here Media says a bull is a "hunky, muscular" bodybuilder who weighs 200 pounds or more. The website says, "These men are big, strong and have muscles you didn't even know existed." Attitude says bulls have a "super-muscular build" with any hair style, and can be any age
- chicken – a young twink. Attitude says chickens are "hairless and young" with a slim or skinny build
- chickenhawk – a typically older man who seeks younger men. From chickenhawk, a designation for several birds which are thought to hunt chickens
- pig – someone who is "more focused on sex than anything else, often into kinkier and somewhat seedier sexual practices", according to Pride.com
- silver fox – an older man with gray hair
- twink – a young or young-looking gay man, with little body hair and a slender build
- twunk – a twink with well-developed physique (from twink + hunk)

== See also ==
- Anti-LGBTQ rhetoric
- Gender transposition
- Handkerchief code
- LGBTQ linguistics
- Terminology of homosexuality
