= Trade (gay slang) =

Casual partner of a gay man

Trade is a gay slang term which traditionally refers to the casual sex partner of a gay man. The partner is typically poor and heterosexual, engaging in sex work with a wealthier gay man. More modern usage has centered on any casual sexual encounter between men, and as an adjective to refer to any male considered masculine and sexually appealing.

In the term's historical usage, rough trade is a variant describing partners with characteristics stereotypical of extreme masculinity. This may include physical strength, roughness, and calloused hands. These men are usually laborers in physically demanding occupations, such as factory work, construction, and farming.

== Historical usage ==
Trade originally referred to casual sex partners regardless of sexuality, as many gay and bisexual men were closeted. The term later evolved to often imply a form of sex work, where the trade is a heterosexual and economically deprived man, partnering with a wealthier gay man for economic benefit. This may be through direct cash payments, or subtler means like gifts and tuition. Examples of this include wealthy Englishmen finding partners among deprived Cockneys in 1930s London.

These gay men may interpret the outward heterosexuality of trades differently. Some may assume that their partners are indeed straight, out of desiring having a sexual relationship with a straight man; while others may regard trades as actually closeted gay men, in an attempt to rationalise their own sexuality by pretending that they too are "doing it for the money" only.

In Victorian and Edwardian eras, guardsmen of the British army – the Coldstream Guards in particular – have also had a reputation as sexual partners to wealthier partners, despite themselves also being long regarded as coming from relatively elite backgrounds. This has led to their figuring in plays by playwrights such as Georges Feydeau and Ferenc Molnár as partners to adulterous society ladies, as well as to their performing as partners of men. The novelist J. R. Ackerley wrote in his memoir My Father and Myself that he considered his guardsman father to have been the lover of an aristocrat for a long period of time before pursuing a wife and family, economically bettered in the end by the support he had received from his male partner.

=== Rough trade ===
Rough trade is a variant term, describing trades who fall within a stereotype of extreme masculinity. These men may be physically strong, vulgar, rough, tough, have calloused hands, and are typically laborers in truckdriving, factory work, construction, farming, and other physically demanding careers. They are sought out by gay men with elevated conceptions of masculinity. Those who rely on such sex work for their livelihoods may therefore intentionally exaggerate these characteristics to increase their appeal. Most gay men, however, avoid these rough trades due to their danger, as they frequently commit violence and sometimes murder out of homophobia.

The writer James Pope-Hennessy was murdered in 1974 by men he become acquaintanced to via rough trade. Rumours of rough trade involvement also circulated about the 1975 murder of film director Pier Paolo Pasolini, the 1976 death of actor Sal Mineo, and the 2005 murder of designer Rudolph Moshammer.

Accusations of rough trade have been used as a form of victim blaming. Notably, the murder of Matthew Shepard, which sparked hate crime legislation in 2009, was described by Camille Paglia as trade-related. Even within the gay press, journalists have sometimes avoided covering violent incidents, fearing that it would generate accusations that the victim was pursuing rough trade.

== Modern usage ==
In more modern usage, the term 'trade' has evolved to describe any casual sexual encounter between men, and as an adjective to refer to any male considered straight presenting but is sexually attracted to other men.

== See also ==
- Down-low (sexual slang)
- Situational sexual behavior
- Men who have sex with men
