= Chickenhawk =

Chickenhawk may refer to:

- Chickenhawk (bird), a common name for three species of bird
  - Cooper's hawk
  - Sharp-shinned hawk
  - Red-tailed hawk
- Chickenhawk (politics), a person who supports war yet actively avoided military service when of age
- Chickenhawk (gay slang), older males who prefer younger or younger-looking males
  - Chicken Hawk: Men Who Love Boys, a 1994 documentary about NAMBLA
- Chickenhawk (book), by Robert Mason
- Henery Hawk, an animated character from the American Looney Tunes series
- The Chicken Hawk, a 1951 Mexican comedy western film starring Pedro Infante
