= Latent homosexuality =

Non-consciously experienced attraction toward members of the same sex

Latent homosexuality is an erotic attraction toward members of the same sex that is not consciously experienced or expressed in overt action. This may mean a hidden inclination or potential for interest in homosexual relationships, which is either suppressed or not recognized, and which has not yet been explored, or may never be explored.

The term was originally proposed by Sigmund Freud. Some argue that latent homosexuality is a potentially iatrogenic effect (that is, it is not present until suggested by a therapist). Others argue that the term latent is not truly applicable in the case of homosexual urges, since they are often not in the unconscious or unexpressed category, but rather exist in the conscious mind and are repressed on a conscious level.

== Links to homophobia ==
A theory that homophobia is a result of latent homosexuality was put forth in the late 20th century. A 1996 study from the University of Georgia by Henry Adams, Lester Wright Jr., and Bethany Lohr was conducted concerning this theory. The research was done on 64 heterosexual men, 35 of whom exhibited homophobic traits and 29 who did not. They were assigned to groups on the basis of their scores on the Index of Homophobia (W.W. Hudson & W.A. Ricketts, 1980). The groups did not differ in aggression.

Three tests were conducted using penile plethysmography. While there was no difference in response when the men were exposed to heterosexual and lesbian pornography, there was a major difference in response when the men were exposed to male homosexual pornography.

The researchers reported that 24% of the non-homophobic men showed some degree of tumescence in response to the male homosexual video, compared to 54% of the subjects who scored high on the homophobia scale. In addition, 66% of the non-homophobic group showed no significant increases in tumescence after this video, but only 20% of the homophobic men failed to display any arousal. Additionally, when the participants rated their degree of sexual arousal later, the homophobic men significantly underestimated their degree of arousal by the male homosexual video.

The results of this study indicate that individuals who score in the homophobic range and admit negative affect toward homosexuality demonstrate significant sexual arousal to male homosexual erotic stimuli.

These results evidence homophobia as a threat to an individual's own homosexual impulses causing repression, denial, or reaction formation (or all three; West, 1977).

== In fiction ==
In Kingsley Amis' 1966 book The Anti-Death League, the main character is introduced while resisting treatment for repressed homosexuality – which a doctor believes that he has – despite the man being openly homosexual.

Latent homosexual themes were a common theme of science fiction films of the 1950s.

In the 1999 film American Beauty, the character Colonel Fitts (Chris Cooper) is depicted as being a latent homosexual. Throughout the film, Fitts makes several statements that are narrow-minded and homophobic, and it disturbs the colonel that his son Ricky might be homosexual. However, toward the end of the film, it is revealed that Fitts has sexual feelings toward men when he approaches his neighbor Lester Burnham (Kevin Spacey) and kisses him, but Lester rejects Col. Fitts, and this greatly humiliates him.

Latent homosexuality was used a recurring joke on the television series Frasier and Arrested Development. Arrested Development – Psychiatrist Tobias Fünke (played by David Cross), who diagnoses patients as 'homosexual', is comically oblivious to his own signs of latent homosexuality.

== See also ==
- Bi-curious – Person who is attracted to experiencing bisexuality
- Closeted – LGBTQ people who have not disclosed their sexual orientation or gender identity
- Coming out – Process of revealing one's sexual orientation or other attributes
- Denial – Assertion that a statement is false
- G0y – Men who are attracted to men but don't identify as gay or bisexual
- Gay-for-pay – Gay sex work performed by heterosexual people
- Heteroflexible – Mostly heterosexual orientation with some homosexual attraction
- Kinsey scale – Scale for measuring sexual orientation
- Outing – Disclosing an LGBTQ person's identity without their consent
- Prehomosexual – Field of sexual orientation research
- Psychological repression – Unconscious defense mechanism
- Same-sex attraction – Attraction between people of the same sex or gender

== Sources ==
- Weinstein, Netta; Ryan, William S.; Dehaan, Cody R.; Przybylski, Andrew K.; Legate, Nicole; Ryan, Richard M. (2012). "Parental autonomy support and discrepancies between implicit and explicit sexual identities: Dynamics of self-acceptance and defense". Journal of Personality and Social Psychology. 102 (4): 815–32. doi:10.1037/a0026854. PMID 22288529.
