= Mapero =

Peruvian LGBTQ slang

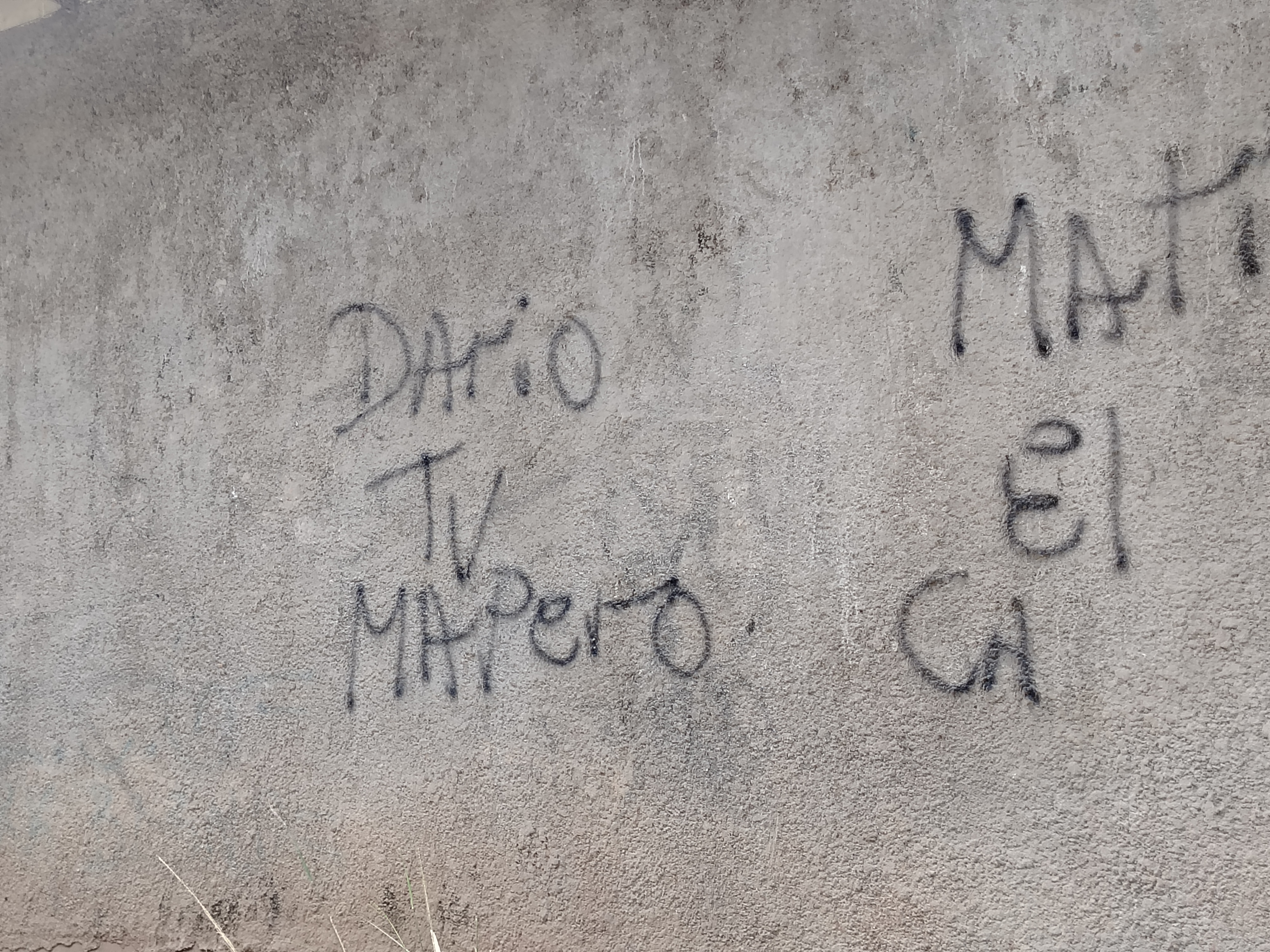
Graffiti made by a mapero in Iquitos

Mapero is a term in Peruvian LGBTQ slang that originated in the Indigenous Amazonian communities, and is used by cisgender men and some men who have sex with men (MSM) to refer to themselves. The term refers to "active" cisgender men who maintain sexual and romantic relationships with gay men, transvestites, and transgender women. Within the Amazonian socioculture, maperos are still considered heterosexual, and are generally expected to eventually marry and have children. Their counterpart is the chivo, an openly effeminate homosexual man who is often the primary partner or lover of a mapero.

== Context ==
=== Historical background ===
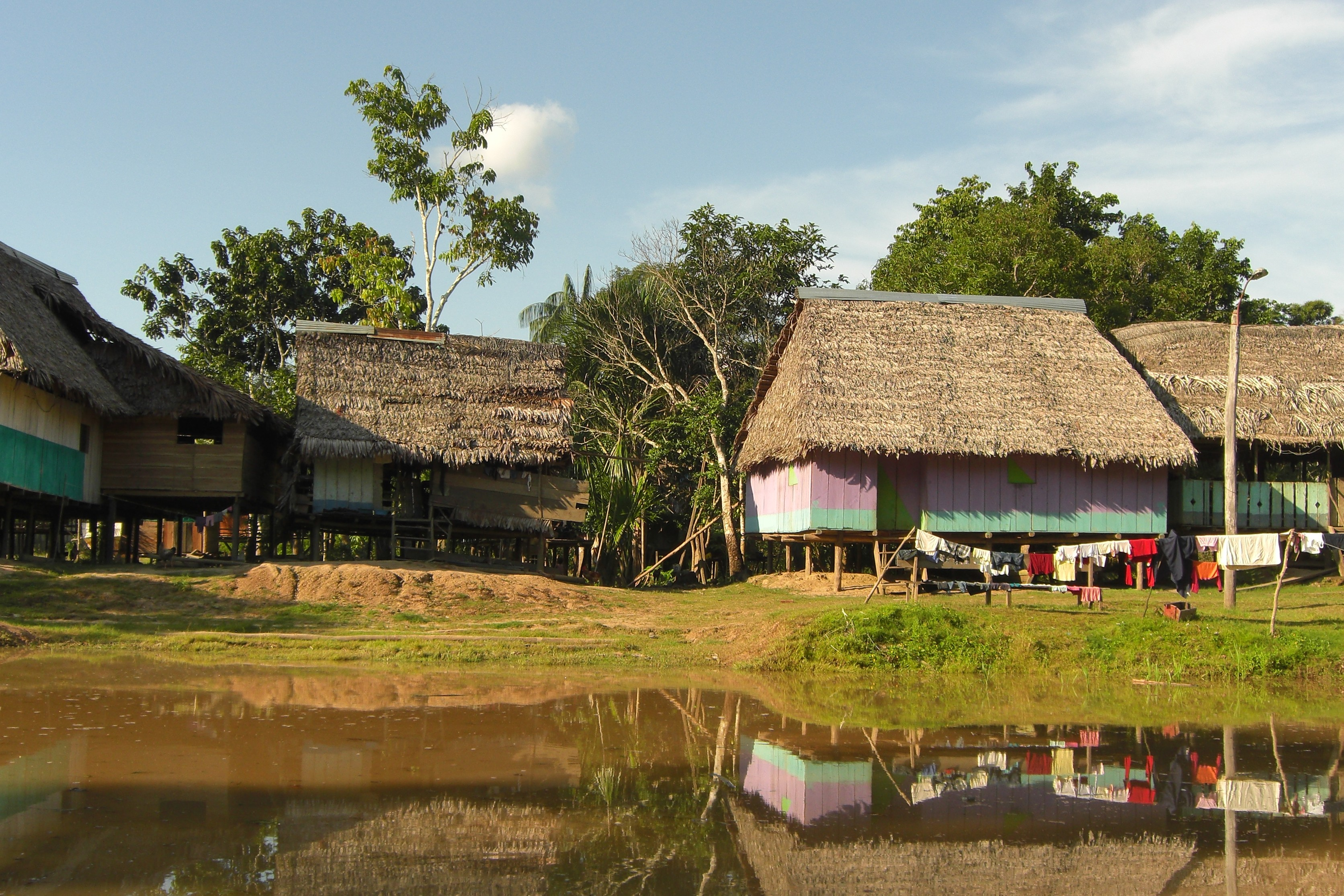
The maperos originated in the Amazonian communities in Loreto

Some indigenous communities in the Peruvian Amazon allowed boys to engage in sexual relations with young or older adult men. This way of losing one's virginity was part of a ritual that marked the transition from boyhood to manhood. The man who had sex with the boy belonged to a different Indigenous community and identified himself as gay. However, the boys who experienced their sexual debut with a gay man did not regard themselves as gay. Groups of young men experiencing this transition were known as maperos or maperetes.

The National Center for Biotechnology Information (NCBI) of the United States recorded the testimony of a young indigenous man regarding his sexual identity:

Of course they are not [the maperos] gay; they are men who like to have sex with both women and gay men. Besides, we do not like having sex with gay men; we like having sex with heterosexual men."

The NCBI also notes that levels of acceptance of homosexuality and the ritual of sexual initiation practices vary according to geographic region and Indigenous community, with communities near the Ecuadorian border showing little or no acceptance of maperos.

In the Amazonian communities, the distinction between passive and active homosexual men is still maintained, while the term "gay" is more related to femininity. In more recent years, the passive/active distinction has been partly replaced by the concept of moderno which combines the ideals of virile masculinity traditionally associated with heterosexual men with a form of homoeroticism that differs from the image of the effeminate gay man:

This [moderno] is understood as living in "modernity", hence the name. While the category "modernx" is usually associated with both active and passive sexual roles, in Loreto we find that the term explains more than a sexual role and becomes a way of naming oneself and recognizing oneself within the community.

=== Social aspects ===
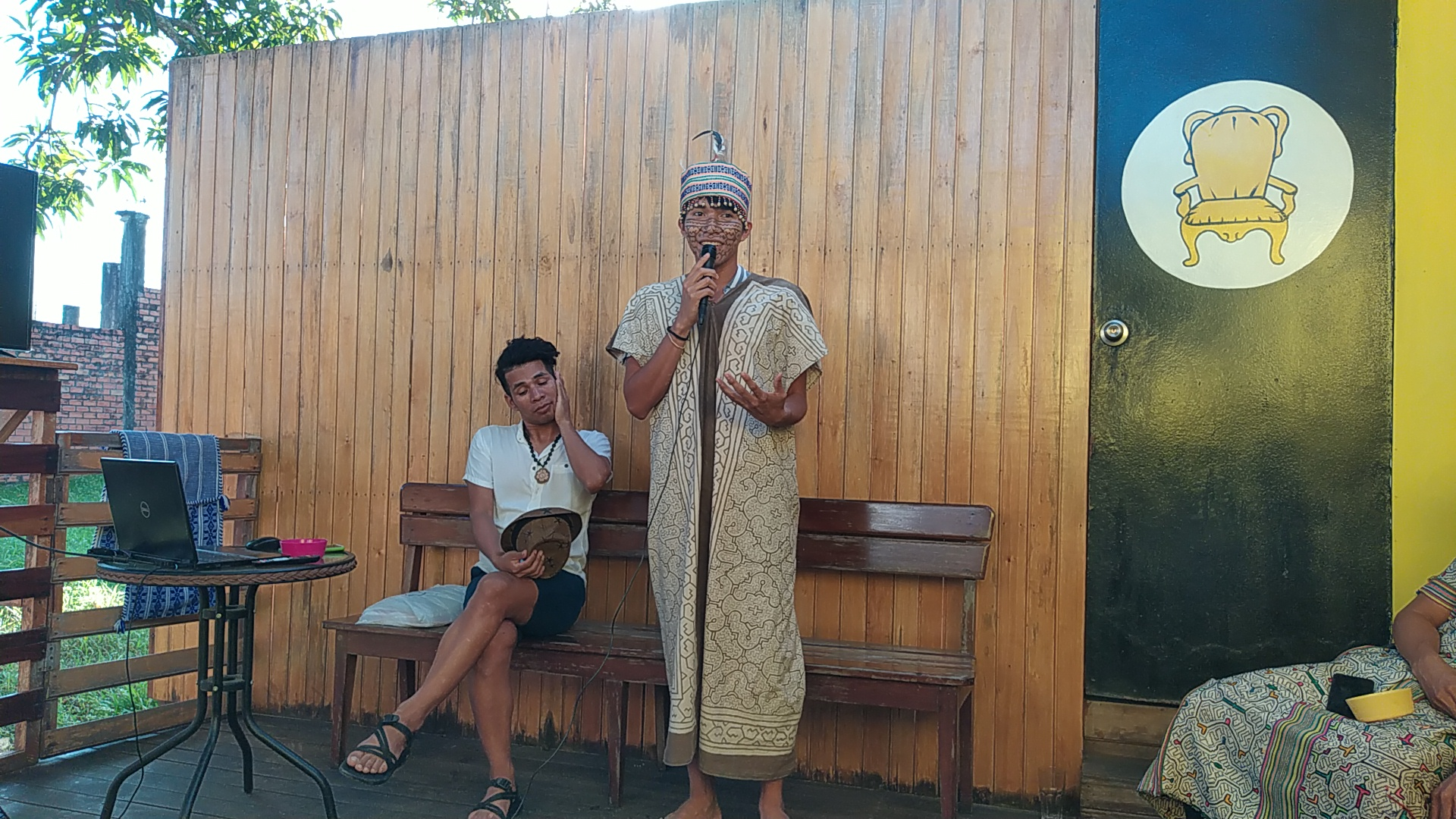
Queer members of the Shipibo-Konibo ethnic group in Pucallpa, the moderno is wearing a more westernized clothing

The mapero does not identify as gay because he associates that term with the passive sexual role. Instead, he tends to identify with his own interpretation of "moderno", although his primary romantic and sexual partners are often gay men, transvestites, and transgender women, as maperismo categorizes all of these gender identities as feminine.

Within the mapero culture, fidelity is valued more highly than sexual exclusivity. Men who identify as maperos often maintain a dual identity, having both a heterosexual wife or official female partner and homosexual lovers. Maperos also occupy a relatively high position within local non-heterosexual hierarchies, largely because of the value placed on their masculine and physically attractive appearance.

Some LGBT sections criticize the concept of the mapero, arguing that relationships between maperos and transvestites can be exploitative and discriminatory:

A common practice among travestites is to [financially] support the mapero man or 'husband'. This involves working and using their resources to provide him with gifts and/or money in order to keep him close and 'faithful' to them.

A derivative of mapero is mapacho, a word that was used as the title of a film (es) that tells the story of a relationship between a motorcycle-taxi driver and a transgender hairdresser.

The counterpart of a mapero is the chivo, a non-heterosexual man who is openly effeminate. Because they choose not to conceal their sexuality or gender expression, chivos are often targets of homophobic violence.

== Notable maperos ==
The LGBT journalist and activist Beto Ortiz has described himself as a mapero.

== Health concerns ==
Because many maperos do not regard themselves as part of the LGBT community, they are less likely to participate in prevention campaigns such as those focused on HIV/AIDS. As a result, they are considered a particularly vulnerable group with regard to sexually transmitted infections.
