= GUG =

Gug or GUG may refer to:

- Avianca Guatemala, a defunct Guatemalan airline
- Gay until graduation
- Girls Under Glass, a German musical group
- Guarani language
- Gugulethu, a township in the Western Cape, South Africa
- Madeleine Gug (1913–1971), French film editor
- Valine, encoded by codon GUG
- Gugs, creatures in H. P. Lovecraft's novella The Dream-Quest of Unknown Kadath
