= Gold star (LGBTQ slang) =

Slang for a type of lesbian or gay man

In LGBTQ slang, a "gold star lesbian" is a lesbian who has never had sex with a man, and a "gold star gay" is a gay man who has never had sex with a woman. The terms can be used jokingly, be sincerely held identities, or be stereotypes within the LGBTQ community. When used sincerely, the terms have been criticised as exclusionary towards bisexuality, transgender people, and other experiences of gender and sexuality, and as stigmatising survivors of sexual violence.

The related term "gold star asexual" refers not to past sexual experience, but to an asexual person whose asexuality cannot be attributed to trauma, disability or other external factors.

== History ==
The earliest known written documentation of the term comes from the 1995 book Revolutionary Laughter: A World of Women Comics, which quotes a stand-up act by lesbian comedian Carol Steinel, who said, "I'm not, in fact, a gold star lesbian — that's a lesbian who’s never slept with a man. No, I know it's shocking, but it's true — I did, once, accidentally sleep with a man. For a year." The term was later used by Howard Stern to describe Melissa Etheridge on The Howard Stern Show in 1998, and on The L Word in 2006.

== Gold star gay and lesbian ==
The term gold star lesbian can position women who have never had sex with men as "more authentic", as they are not "contaminated" by men, according to Lucy Jones in Dyke/Girl (2012). It can be used as a humorous rejection of heterosexuality. In Cosmopolitan, Marianne Eloise wrote that the term can be a source of pride or comfort to some lesbians, including those with traumatic experiences of masculinity, but that it has cissexist implications. It can also be derogatory towards bisexual women.

Shelby and Dolan, in Lesbian Women and Sexual Health (2014), reported that gold star lesbian can be used by lesbians to stigmatise other women who have past or present sexual relationships with men. The social psychologist Petra Boynton, in an opinion column for The Daily Telegraph, said it is a "toxic label" that excludes bisexual women, diversity within sexuality and gender, victims of sexual violence and other life experiences. Boynton said it can also be used as "a slur against lesbians". Elizabeth Pearce, in her PhD thesis documented people identifying as femme lesbians who were met dismissively by other lesbians, whether through lack of a "gold star" or disbelief that they were a "gold star lesbian".

John Paul Brammer, in his memoir ¡Hola Papi! How to Come Out in a Walmart Parking Lot and Other Life Lessons (2021), described gold star gay as a "prolific" phrase in gay circles, and associated it with a "performative disgust" for women's genitalia or bodies that can "reduce women". Brammer rejected the term for treating a part of his past—his high school relationship with a girlfriend—as "disposable".

In Feminist Studies, Nan Alamilla Boyd analysed lesbian history as "the history of an idea rather than a group of people", and considered the concept "gold star lesbian" (or "lifelong lesbian") to hold "a lot of ideological weight". Boyd commented that the homophile movement predates the identity "lesbian", but that the idea of a lifelong lesbian later became useful to particular communities. In a PhD thesis, Caroline Lippy said that "gold star lesbian" is a "community stereotype" reflective of communication or empathy barriers between some lesbians: a "gold star lesbian" may be unable to provide empathy or advice to a lesbian with wider sexual experiences.

== Gold star asexual ==
The term gold star asexual, coined in 2010 by a blogger, refers to an asexual person who is able-bodied, sociable and in all other ways considered "normal". It is a hypothetical ideal of a person whose asexuality will not be dismissed, as it could not be attributed to trauma or other factors. The term is a response to prejudice that being allosexual is better than being asexual. Unlike other gold star terms, it does not indicate anything about past sexual activity.

== Silver star gay and lesbian ==
The term silver star lesbian refers to a lesbian who has had sex with one man in the past, and then no more.

== Example usages ==
Andy Cohen has identified with the term gold star gay; in his memoir Superficial (2016), he recounts a story about his attitude towards a threesome with a heterosexual couple in light of his pride for being a "gold star gay". In an article by the BBC, the BBC described the lesbian pornographic actor Lily Cade as a "gold star lesbian", in connection with her refusal to have sex with transgender women. In "Emergency Contact" (2017), a season 9 Will & Grace episode, the term platinum star gay is jokingly used by a character to indicate that he is not only a "gold star gay", but was born via Caesarean section. The term has, nonetheless, become controversial.

According to women quoted in Cosmopolitan, the term gold star lesbian had declined in popularity by 2021, but reflected a still-existing concept.

== See also ==
- Biphobia
