= Biphobia =

Aversion to bisexual people

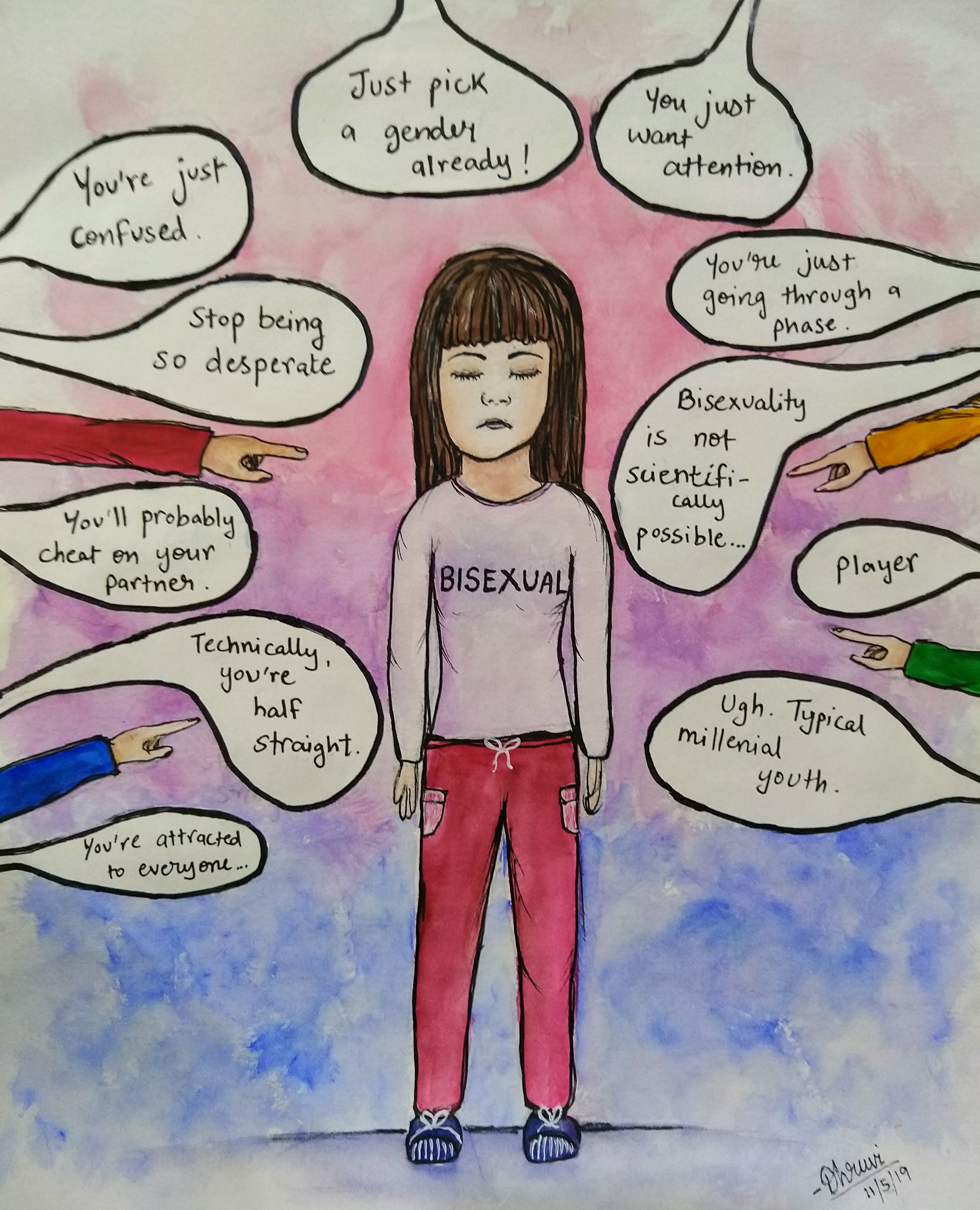
An illustration of examples of various stigma against bisexuals

Biphobia or monosexism is aversion toward bisexual people or bisexuality as a sexual orientation. Biphobic prejudice commonly presents as denial that bisexuality is a genuine sexual orientation, negative stereotypes about people who are bisexual (such as the beliefs that they are promiscuous or dishonest), or bisexual erasure.

The hatred of bisexual women is referred to as bimisogyny or less commonly bisexism.

== Etymology and usage ==
Biphobia is a portmanteau patterned on the term homophobia. It derives from the Latin prefix bi- (meaning "two, double") and the root -phobia (from the Greek: φόβος, phóbos, "fear") found in homophobia. Along with transphobia and homophobia, it is one of a family of terms used to describe intolerance and discrimination against LGBTQ people. The adjectival form biphobic describes things or qualities related to biphobia, and the less-common noun biphobe is a label for people thought to harbor biphobia.

The term biphobia was first introduced in 1992 by researcher Kathleen Bennett to mean "prejudice against bisexuality" and "the denigration of bisexuality as a life-choice." It has subsequently been defined as "any portrayal or discourse denigrating or criticizing men or women on the sole ground of their belonging to this [bisexual] socio-sexual identity, or refusing them the right to claim it."

== Forms ==
=== Denial and erasure ===
Biphobia can lead people to deny that bisexuality is real, asserting that people who identify as bisexual are not genuinely bisexual, or that the phenomenon is far less common than they claim. One form of this denial is based on the heterosexist view that heterosexuality is the only true or natural sexual orientation. Thus anything that deviates from that is instead either a psychological pathology or an example of anti-social behavior.

Another form of denial stems from binary views of sexuality: that people are assumed monosexual, i.e. homosexual (gay/lesbian) or heterosexual (straight). Throughout the 1980s, modern research on sexuality was dominated by the idea that heterosexuality and homosexuality were the only legitimate orientations, dismissing bisexuality as "secondary homosexuality". In that model, bisexuals are presumed to be either closeted lesbian/gay people wishing to appear heterosexual, or individuals (of "either" orientation) experimenting with sexuality outside of their "normal" interest. Maxims such as "people are either gay, straight, or lying" embody this dichotomous view of sexual orientation.

Some people accept the theoretical existence of bisexuality but define it narrowly, as being only the equal sexual attraction towards both men and women. Thus the many bisexual individuals with unequal attractions are instead categorized as either homosexual or heterosexual. Others acknowledge the existence of bisexuality in women, but deny that men can be bisexual.

Some denial asserts that bisexual behavior or identity is merely a social trend – as exemplified by "bisexual chic" or gender bending – and not an intrinsic personality trait. Same-gender sexual activity is dismissed as merely a substitute for sex with members of the opposite sex, or as a more accessible source of sexual gratification. Situational homosexuality in sex-segregated environments is presented as an example of this behavior.

Biphobia is common from the heterosexual community, but is frequently exhibited by gay and lesbian people as well, usually with the notion that bisexuals are able to escape oppression from heterosexuals by conforming to social expectations of opposite-gender sex and romance. This leaves some that identify as bisexual to be perceived as "not enough of either" or "not real". An Australian study conducted by Roffee and Waling in 2016 established that bisexual people faced microaggressions, bullying, and other anti-social behaviors from people within the lesbian and gay community.

Bisexual erasure (also referred to as bisexual invisibility) is a phenomenon that tends to omit, falsify, or re-explain evidence of bisexuality in history, academia, the news media, and other primary sources, sometimes to the point of denying that bisexuality exists.

Kenji Yoshino (2000) writes that there are three concepts that cause invisibility within bisexuality: "The three invisibilities can be seen as nested within each other; the first affects straights, gays, and bisexuals; the second affects only gays and bisexuals; and the third affects only bisexuals." Forms of social standards and expectations, religion, and integrating the same-sex attraction aspect of bisexuality with homosexuality contribute to invisibility.

==== Allegations that bisexual men are homophobic ====
One cause of biphobia in the gay male community is that there is an identity political tradition to assume that acceptance of male homosexuality is linked to the belief that men's sexuality is specialized. This causes many members of the gay male community to assume that the very idea that men can be bisexual is homophobic to gay men. A number of bisexual men feel that such attitudes force them to keep their bisexuality in the closet and that it is even more oppressive than traditional heteronormativity. These men argue that the gay male community has something to learn about respect for the individual from the lesbian community, in which there is not a strong tradition to assume links between notions about the origins of sexual preferences and the acceptance thereof. These views are also supported by some gay men who do not like anal sex (sides, as opposed to both tops and bottoms) and report that they feel bullied by other gay men's assumption that their dislike for anal sex is "homophobic" and want more respect for the individuality in which a gay man who does not hate himself may simply not like anal sex and instead prefer other sex acts such as mutual fellatio and mutual male masturbation.

==== Claims of bisexuals adapting to heteronormativity ====
Some forms of prejudice against bisexuals are claims that bisexuality is an attempt in persecuted homosexuals to adapt to heteronormative societies by adopting a bisexual identity. Such claims are criticized by bisexuals and researchers studying the situation of bisexuals for falsely assuming that same-sex relationships would somehow escape persecution in heteronormative cultures by simply identifying as bisexual instead of homosexual. These researchers cite that all countries with laws against sex between people of the same sex give the same punishment regardless of what sexual orientation the people found guilty identify as, that any countries where same-sex marriage is illegal never allow marriages between people of the same sex no matter if they identify as bisexual instead of homosexual, and that laws against "gay" male blood donors invariably prohibit any man who had sex with other men from donating blood no matter if he identifies as homosexual or as bisexual. The conclusion made by these researchers is that since there is no societal benefit in identifying as bisexual instead of identifying as homosexual, the claim that bisexuals are homosexuals trying to adapt to a heteronormative society is simply false and biphobic and causes bisexuals to suffer a two-way discrimination from both LGBTQ society and heteronormative society that is worse than the one-way discrimination from heteronormative society that is faced by homosexuals. It is also argued that such two-way discrimination causes many bisexuals to hide their bisexuality to an even greater extent than homosexuals hide their sexuality, leading to underestimations of the prevalence of bisexuality especially in men for whom such assumptions of "really being completely gay" are the most rampant.

In the book Bi: Notes for a Bisexual Revolution, Shiri Eisner (2013) mentions Miguel Obradors-Campos' argument that bisexual individuals endure stigma by heterosexuals as well as gay and lesbian individuals. Eisner (2013) also writes, "some forms of biphobic stigma frequently observed in gay and lesbian communities: that bisexuals are privileged, that bisexuals will ultimately choose heterosexual relationships and lifestyles, that bisexual women are reinforcing patriarchy, that bisexuality is not a political identity, that bisexual women carry HIV to lesbian communities, and so on."

=== Negative stereotypes ===
Many stereotypes about people who identify as bisexual stem from denial or bisexual erasure. Because their orientation is not recognized as valid, they are stereotyped as confused, indecisive, insecure, experimenting, or "just going through a phase".

The association of bisexuality with promiscuity stems from a variety of negative stereotypes targeting bisexuals as mentally or socially unstable people for whom sexual relations only with men, only with women, or only with one person at a time is not enough. These stereotypes may result from cultural assumptions that "men and women are so different that desire for one is an entirely different beast from desire for the other" ("a defining feature of heterosexism"), and that "verbalizing a sexual desire inevitably leads to attempts to satisfy that desire."

As a result, bisexuals may bear a social stigma from accusations of cheating on or betraying their partners, leading a double life, being "on the down-low", and spreading sexually transmitted diseases such as HIV/AIDS. This presumed behavior is further generalized as dishonesty, secrecy, and deception. Bisexuals can be characterized as being "slutty", "easy", indiscriminate, and nymphomaniacs. Furthermore, they are strongly associated with polyamory, swinging, and polygamy, the last being an established heterosexual tradition sanctioned by some religions and legal in several countries. This is despite the fact that bisexual people are as capable of monogamy or serial monogamy as homosexuals or heterosexuals.

==== Tensions with pansexuals ====
Bisexuals frequently struggle with myths and misconceptions about the definition of bisexuality, such as the idea that bisexuality conforms to the gender binary (thereby excluding attraction to nonbinary individuals), or excludes attraction to trans people in general. This sometimes creates tension between bisexuals and pansexuals, as pansexuals often see themselves as being more inclusive to a wider array of genders. A 2022 study by the Journal of Bisexuality suggested that the majority of women who identify as pansexual or queer defined bisexuality as limited to attraction to cisgender men and women and critiqued bisexuality as reinforcing the traditional gender binary. However, bisexual women defined bisexuality as attraction to two or more, or "similar or dissimilar" genders, described bisexuality as inclusive of attractions to all genders, and reported negative psychological outcomes as a result of the debate around bisexual gender inclusivity.

A 2017 study published in the Journal of Bisexuality found that when bisexuals and pansexuals described gender and defined bisexuality, "there were no differences in how pansexual and bisexual people ... discussed sex or gender", and that the findings "do not support the stereotype that bisexual people endorse a binary view of gender while pansexual people do not."

Definitions of bisexuality are historically transcendent of sex and gender, with authors such as Janet Bode, who published View From Another Closet: Exploring Bisexuality in Women in 1976, noting, "Being bisexual does not mean they have sexual relations with both sexes but that they are capable of meaningful and intimate involvement with a person regardless of gender."

This sentiment was echoed throughout the early bisexual community and touched on by bisexual activist Lani Ka'ahumanu, who wrote in the 1987 article The Bisexual Community: Are We Visible Yet?, "I am bisexual because I am drawn to particular people regardless of gender. It doesn’t make me wishy-washy, confused, untrustworthy, or more sexually liberated. It makes me a bisexual."

Opposition to the pansexual label as distinct or separate from bisexuality, in particular due to ahistorical and biphobic implications, is also touched upon by Ka'ahumanu in the 25th anniversary edition of Bi Any Other Name: Bisexual People Speak Out.

== Effects ==
The mental and sexual health effects of biphobia on bisexual people are numerous. One study showed that bisexuals are often trapped in between the binaries of heterosexuality and homosexuality, creating a form of invalidation around their sexual identity. This often leads to recognized indicators of mental health issues such as low self-esteem and self-worth. These indicators and pressures to "choose" a sexual identity can, in many cases, lead to depression as they may feel they live in a culture that does not recognize their existence.

While doing research on women at high risk of HIV infection, one study, from the Journal of Bisexuality, concluded that bisexual women in the high-risk cohort studied were more likely to engage in various high-risk behaviors and were at a higher risk of contracting HIV and other sexually transmitted diseases. These behaviors have been attributed to the unlikeliness of bisexuals discussing their sexuality and proper protection with health professionals for fear of judgement or discrimination, causing them to become undereducated on the issue(s). In the book, Bi: Notes for a Bisexual Revolution, Shiri Eisner (2013) discusses the suicidality statistics amongst bisexual identifying individuals as compared to heterosexuals, gays, and lesbians. Eisner (2013) referred to a Canadian study that found bisexual women had higher rates of suicidality as compared to heterosexual and lesbian women; the study also found that bisexual men also had increased rates of suicidality as compared to heterosexual and gay men.

Bisexual-identified people may face disparities in harsher degrees than their gay and lesbian peers. In the U.S. in particular, for example, they may face:

- Lower success rates for refugee applications; may also be the case in Canada and Australia
- Higher levels of intimate partner violence
- Higher likelihood of youth risk behavior amongst high school students
- Higher likelihood of anxiety and mood disorders amongst bisexual women and men who report having sex with both sexes
- Higher likelihood of living on less than $30,000 a year
- Lower levels of reporting feeling "very accepted" in the workplace
- Lower likelihood of being out to the important people in their lives
- "Bisexuals report higher rates of hypertension, poor or fair physical health, smoking, and risky drinking than heterosexuals or lesbians/gays"
- "Bisexual women in relationships with monosexual partners have an increased rate of domestic violence compared to women in other demographic categories"
- "Many, if not most, bisexual people do not come out to their healthcare providers. This means they are getting incomplete information (for example, about safer sex practices)"
- "Bisexual women were more likely to be current smokers and acute drinkers"
- Higher risk of self harm, and suicidal ideation or attempts
- Feeling shame or discomfort with their sexual orientation or not feeling ready to be "out" to loved ones

== Intersectional perspectives ==
=== Intersections with feminism ===
Feminist positions on bisexuality range greatly, from acceptance of bisexuality as a feminist issue to rejection of bisexuality as a reactionary and anti-feminist backlash to lesbian feminism.

A bisexual woman filed a lawsuit against the lesbian feminist magazine Common Lives/Lesbian Lives, alleging discrimination against bisexuals when her submission was not published.

A widely studied example of lesbian-bisexual conflict within feminism was the Northampton Pride March during the years between 1989 and 1993, where many feminists involved debated over whether bisexuals should be included and whether or not bisexuality was compatible with feminism. Common lesbian-feminist critiques leveled at bisexuality were that bisexuality was anti-feminist, that bisexuality was a form of false consciousness, and that bisexual women who pursue relationships with men were "deluded and desperate". However, tensions between bisexual feminists and lesbian feminists have eased since the 1990s, as bisexual women have become more accepted within the feminist community.

Nevertheless, some lesbian feminists such as Julie Bindel are still critical of bisexuality. Bindel has described female bisexuality as a "fashionable trend" being promoted due to "sexual hedonism" and broached the question of whether bisexuality even exists. She has also made tongue-in-cheek comparisons of bisexuals to cat fanciers and devil worshippers.

Lesbian feminist Sheila Jeffreys writes in The Lesbian Heresy (1993) that while many feminists are comfortable working alongside gay men, they are uncomfortable interacting with bisexual men. Jeffreys states that while gay men are unlikely to sexually harass women, bisexual men are just as likely to be bothersome to women as heterosexual men.

Donna Haraway was the inspiration and genesis for cyberfeminism with her 1985 essay "A Cyborg Manifesto: Science, Technology, and Socialist-Feminism in the Late Twentieth Century" which was reprinted in Simians, Cyborgs and Women: The Reinvention of Nature (1991). Haraway's essay states that the cyborg "has no truck with bisexuality, pre-oedipal symbiosis, unalienated labor, or other seductions to organic wholeness through a final appropriation of all powers of the parts into a higher unity."

=== Intersections with gender ===
==== Men ====
Studies indicate that preferences against dating bisexual men are stronger than against bisexual women, even amongst bisexual women.

=== Intersections with race ===
While the general bisexual population as a whole faces biphobia, this oppression is also aggravated by other factors such as race. In a study conducted by Grady L. Garner Jr. titled Managing Heterosexism and Biphobia: A Revealing Black Bisexual Male Perspective, the author interviews 14 self-identified black bisexual men to examine how they cope with heterosexism and biphobia in order to formulate coping strategies. Data from the interviews revealed that 33% of the participants reported heterosexism and biphobia experiences, while 67% did not. He explains that the internalization of negative sociocultural messages, reactions, and attitudes can be incredibly distressing as bisexual black males attempted to translate or transform these negative experiences into positive bisexual identity sustaining ones.

== See also ==
- Gold star gay – Slang for a type of lesbian or gay man
- International Day Against Homophobia, Transphobia and Biphobia
- List of phobias § Cultural prejudices and discrimination
- Victimization of bisexual women
