= G0y =

Men who are attracted to men but don't identify as gay or bisexual

Flag
- Brazilian g0y flag
- Flag name: Brazilian g0y flag

G0y, also spelled as gØy or g-zero-y (pronounced "goy" or "g-zero-y"; the second character is the digit zero, not the letter o), is a subculture that appeared in the 2000s in the United States and has since spread to Brazil. The g0y self-identify as men who are attracted to men, but not as homosexual or bisexual. In such relationships, men consider hugging, kissing on lips, caressing, anilingus, frotting, French kissing, handjobs, and fellatio as acceptable. They do not participate in anal sex, seeing it as gay or even violent and dangerous, some of which identify as side (US) or gouine (Brazil).

The g0y movement is inspired by the practices of Ancient Greece. Its adherents do not fight to be included in the LGBTQ civil movements. According to this same philosophy, g0ys do not like to be compared to members of the LGBTQ civil movements, because they do not practice penetration with other men.

In Brazil, members of the g0y subculture are often described as discretos fora do meio (English: discreet outsiders).

== See also ==
- Bicurious
- Bromance
- Closeted
- Heteroflexibility
- Homoeroticism
- Latent homosexuality
