= Situational offender =

Term in criminology

In criminology, the term situational offender is used in several meanings, their common denominator being nontypical character of the offense in question for the person according to some criteria.

Following the classical study of Martin R. Haskell and Lewis Yablonsky Criminology - Crime and Criminality (1974), a situational offender, as opposed to a career criminal, is a person who committed a crime under certain circumstances, but normally is not inclined to commit crimes and is unlikely to repeat the offense.

In sex crimes, a situational sex offender is one whose offense is associated with situational sexual behavior, i.e., sexual behavior different from the person's usual habits. This term is in an opposition to the preferential offender, whose offense is associated with the person's preferential behavior. For example, a preferential child molester is exclusively involved with children, whereas the situational ones are normally engaged in sexual behavior within their peer group.
