= Bisexual chic =

Cultural approach to bisexuality

Bisexual chic is a phrase used to describe the public acknowledgment of bisexuality or increased public interest or acceptance of bisexuality. Another usage describes a faddish attention towards bisexuality. Bisexual chic is often accompanied by celebrities publicly revealing their bisexuality.

== Origin of term ==
In the United States, the 1920s was a decade of social experimentation, particularly with sex. This was heavily influenced by the writings of Sigmund Freud, who theorized that people would behave in any manner to satisfy sexual desire. With the well-publicized image of sexual acts as a part of lesbian relationships, sexual experimentation was widespread. Large cities that provided a nightlife were immensely popular, and women began to seek out sexual adventure. Bisexuality became chic, particularly in America's first gay neighborhoods.

The phrase itself came into wide usage in the 1970s, on the tail end of the hippie movement, which extolled free love. During the glam rock and disco era, there was a media-generated fascination with bisexuality in the club scene and among musicians such as Elton John, David Bowie and Patti Smith; in fact, in 1980, Time magazine referred to Bowie's persona Ziggy Stardust as "the orange-haired founder of bisexual chic." At the same time, bisexual groups formed in several large US cities, heralding the birth of the modern bisexual civil rights and liberation movements.

The phrase can be used to imply someone is only pretending to be bisexual because it's fashionable at the moment. Alternatively, it can be used to assert that someone is free of taboos, experimental, in touch with both masculine and feminine aspects of themselves, and therefore potentially a better lover or even a better person.

== Emergence ==
Though the terminology is attributed to the 1970s, a bisexual trend occurred in the 1920s. In Vice Versa: Bisexuality and the Eroticism of Everyday Life, Marjorie Garber argues that "the twenties has been linked to the popularization of Freud (or "Freudianism"), the advent of World War I, and a general predilection for the daring and unconventional: bobbed hair, short skirts, the rejection of Prohibition and Victorian strictures." Examples of this include drag balls, and the success of artists such as Ernest Hemingway, D. H. Lawrence, Virginia Woolf, and Marlene Dietrich. Looking back from the 1970s, writer Elaine Showalter accused Woolf and the Bloomsbury Group of a form of bisexual chic when she criticized Woolf's recommendation of an androgynous stance rather than "feminist engagement" as being a "form of repression" and an indulging in "the fashion of bisexuality."

== From 1970s onwards ==
After a strain of social movements centred on LGBT rights like the Stonewall riots in 1969, from the 1970s onwards, awareness of bisexuality was on the rise and non-conforming sexual behaviors were seen as acts of social defiance. In 1972, the hit musical film Cabaret featured a love triangle with a man and woman fighting for the same (male) lover. The author who inspired it, Christopher Isherwood, was among the first openly homosexual celebrities. Other prominent cultural representations of the 1970s include The Rocky Horror Picture Show and Sunday Bloody Sunday. In the 1990s, under the influence of the contemporary hipster subculture, which symbolized the resistance against mainstream lifestyles and encouraged unconventionalities, more and more people started to speculate about their own identity as well as sexuality.

The phenomenon of bisexual chic can also be attributed to the growing number of celebrities disclosing their bisexual identity. For example, in 1995, the lead vocalist of punk rock band Green Day, Billie Joe Armstrong, came out as bisexual in an interview with The Advocate. In the media, Madonna's music videos for "Justify My Love" and "Erotica" and her book Sex featured same-sex eroticism. Openly bisexual comedian Sandra Bernhard was featured as a bisexual on the popular television sitcom Roseanne amidst the trend. To illustrate the trend, Roseanne later found herself kissed by another woman and was "consoled" by Bernhard's character, bringing bisexuality to Middle America. The 1992 film Basic Instinct featured a glamorous bisexual murderess played by Sharon Stone. Mainstream singer Janet Jackson recorded a cover version of Rod Stewart's "Tonight's the Night (Gonna Be Alright)" in which she sings to a woman with whom she is about to engage in a ménage à trois, saying, "This is just between me … and you … and you …".

In the 21st century, bisexuality (or manifestations thereof) was shown or alluded to in the films Kissing Jessica Stein, Y tu mamá también, Mulholland Drive, Alexander, Kinsey, and Brokeback Mountain, in the television series The O.C. in the US and Torchwood in the UK, and in Lady Gaga's music videos for "LoveGame" and "Telephone". When in the 2003 MTV Video Music Awards, Madonna kissed Britney Spears and then Christina Aguilera, many news and tabloid outsources referred to it as "lesbian chic". The 2008 hit song "I Kissed a Girl" by Katy Perry had bi-curious lyrics. According to surveys by the CDC in the US, a larger number of female college and high school students in America are experimenting with other women than ever before and report being encouraged to do so by pop culture for the first time.

== Criticism ==
Despite bisexual chic bringing about greater visibility and acceptance of bisexuality, it has been criticised for being "trendy" rather than genuinely advocating bisexual equality. The idea of bisexuality being chic is also detrimental to the bisexual movement in that "faux bisexuality" misrepresents bisexual people by suggesting that their sexuality is only a form of art, not a real sexual orientation.

== See also ==
- Biphobia
- Bisexual erasure
- Lesbian until graduation
- Sexual identity
- Sexual orientation

== Related reading ==
- Beemyn, Brett and Erich Steinman. Bisexual Men in Culture and Society (Binghamton, NY: Haworth Press, 2001).
- "The New Bisexuals." Time, May 13, 1974.
- Geoffrey K. Pullum, "Bixexual chic: the facts", September 6, 2004 (Language Log)
- Reichert, Tom, Kevin R. Maly & Susan C. Zavoina. “Designed for (Male) Pleasure: The Myth of Lesbian Chic in Mainstream Advertising." Meta Carstarphen and Susan C. Zavoina (eds.), Sexual Rhetoric: Media Perspectives on Sexuality, Gender, and Identity (Westport, CT: Greenwood Press, 1999).
- Risman, Barbara and Pepper Schwartz. "After the Sexual Revolution: Gender Politics in Teen Dating," Contexts (Berkeley: U California Press, 2002).
