= Victimization of bisexual women =

Bisexuality describes an individual who feels romantic and/or sexual attraction towards more than one gender. Victimization is any damage or harm inflicted by one individual onto another. In the United States, bisexual women are more prone to various types of victimization. They tend to experience rape, stalking, and partner-perpetrated contact sexual violence at significantly higher rates than heterosexual women. Bisexual women of color reported these forms of violence at much higher rates than white bisexual women, lesbians of all races, and heterosexual women in general.

Bisexual women, as a whole, face increased rates of sexual abuse, physical abuse, and emotional abuse in their childhood compared to heterosexual identifying women. Bisexual women of color encounter these forms of victimization at an even higher volume than white bisexuals, lesbians, and heterosexuals. The bisexual community reports a higher rate of physical health problems along with mental health struggles and substance abuse.

== Demographics and outcomes ==
=== Bisexual people in general ===
In the United States, an estimated 1.8% of the general population identifies as bisexual, with even higher rates among younger generations (4.9%). The term bisexual describes various attractions, sexual, and relational behaviors directed towards individuals of more than one gender. Individuals who identify as bisexual may also use other additional terms to describe their sexual orientation such as, pansexual or queer. More specialized terms, such as omnisexual, polysexual, ambisexual, heteroflexible, or homoflexible may also be used to describe one's sexual orientation.

==== Stressors and stereotypes within the broader LGBTQ+ community ====
Statistically, bisexuals report more negative mental health outcomes when compared to straight, lesbian, and gay individuals. These outcomes include anxiety, depression, life stressors, an unsupportive family, higher reports of childhood trauma, less societal support, and more significant financial stress. The differing issues between bisexual and heterosexual individuals can be attributed to minority stress. Minority stress can be defined as the stress burden that sexual minority individuals experience due to heterosexism. All sexual minorities are at an increased risk for victimization; however, bisexual individuals are at an even higher risk due to bisexual-specific stressors. These stressors include anti-bisexual attitudes within the broader Lesbian, Gay, Bisexual, Transgender, Queer (LGBTQ+) community.

Anti-bisexual stereotypes within the LGBTQ+ community contribute to more significant identity confusion and negative associations towards bisexual individuals. Bisexuality is commonly associated with stigmatizing stereotypes. These stereotypes include increased promiscuity, untrustworthiness, and the belief that bisexuality is a fake or unstable identity. These stereotypes enforce negative attitudes towards bisexual individuals within the LGBTQ+ community and broader society, ultimately increasing the likelihood of bisexual victimization. Decreased connection to the LGBTQ+ community contributes to the adverse mental health outcomes in this population, which is due to the protective effect that community connection is known to have against minority stress for sexual minority individuals. Another bisexual specific stressor is monosexism, which can be defined as the belief that individuals can only be attracted to one gender. This negativity surrounding bisexuals can contribute to bi-erasure, which is when the existence of bisexuality is denied.

=== Bisexual women ===
Out of all sub-groups within the LGBTQ+ community, bisexual women make up the largest demographic of sexual minority individuals in the United States. Overall, 5.5% of women identify as bisexual, with this number reaching 9.8% in female high school students.

==== Mental health issues and substance abuse ====
Bisexual adults, when compared to heterosexual adults, face a much higher rate of depression. They struggle with suicidal ideation, suicidal tendencies, and self-injurious behavior at much higher rates than heterosexuals, gay men, and lesbians. Bisexuals report having thoughts of suicide at three times the rate of heterosexuals. Bisexual individuals are at a higher risk of facing substance abuse, drinking and smoking at higher rates than heterosexuals. Bisexual women, in particular, use drugs, abuse alcohol, drink heavily, and face problems involving alcohol at a higher rate than lesbians and heterosexual women.

The increased rates of victimizing circumstances seen among bisexuals as a whole can be heavily viewed among bisexual women. In particular, 58.7% of bisexual-identified women report mood disorders, with 57.8% reporting anxiety disorders. As teenagers, bisexual women are found to have higher rates of emotional stress than heterosexual women. They are two times as likely to develop an eating disorder than lesbian-identifying women. When compared to heterosexual women, closeted bisexual women struggle with suicidal ideation at higher rates. Among the different forms of victimization bisexuals face, sexual victimization is most often linked to poor mental health. This poor mental health can be viewed in the development of PTSD symptomatology and increased suicidality. Higher rates of victimization in combination with the daily load of minority stress (i.e., daily experiences of discrimination) contributes to higher rates of posttraumatic stress disorder (PTSD) among bisexual individuals.

==== Physical health statistics ====
Bisexual individuals, as a whole, are more frequently diagnosed with asthma and high cholesterol than heterosexuals. Bisexual women are more often diagnosed as obese, are more likely to have heart disease, and are diagnosed with cancer more often than heterosexual women. They are less likely to have frequent gynecological appointments, meaning that they are less often screened for breast cancer or tested for Human Papilloma Virus (HPV).

Bisexual women report health physical health issues after being physically abused, stalked, or sexually abused. They report frequent headaches, chronic pain, insomnia, hearing problems, and struggle with memory, concentration, and decision making.

== Levels of victimization ==
=== Physical violence ===
Several types of victimization are higher among bisexual individuals than gay and lesbian individuals, including threats, physical assault, and physical assault involving a weapon. Similarly, bisexual women experience higher victimization rates within interpersonal relationships, termed interpersonal trauma (IPT), compared to straight and lesbian women. 2.7 million bisexual women reported facing physical abuse from a partner at least once in their lifetime, with 2.3 million experiencing extreme physical abuse. Out of these reports, 53.9% were pushed, slapped, or shoved, and 47.7% reported severe physical abuse. Bisexual women of color face this violence at a much higher rate than white bisexuals. 79.1% Hispanic, 69.4% non-Hispanic Black, and 68.3% non-Hispanic White bisexual women reported contact sexual violence, physical violence, and/or stalking in their lifetimes. Bisexual women reported the youngest age range in which they first experienced this violence, with that age being younger than 18 years old.

=== Sexual violence ===
Bisexual individuals experience higher sexual violence rates, including rape and childhood sexual abuse. Bisexual women also experience higher rates of rape (45.2%), contact sexual violence (79.3%), sexual coercion (47.2%), unwanted sexual contact (72.0%), and public sexual harassment (58.1%) compared to both lesbian and heterosexual-identified women. 2 in 4 bisexual women report being raped in their lives. Bisexual women of color report being raped at high percentages. This includes 47.8% of Hispanic women and 51.4% of a combination of unspecified races that reported being raped. In addition to experiencing a higher frequency of sexual violence, bisexual women tend to report more extreme sexual violence forms than lesbian-identified women.

==== Childhood sexual violence ====
Bisexual women, in particular, experience childhood sexual abuse at rates 5.3 times higher than heterosexual women. Further, the age of onset for childhood sexual abuse is younger among bisexual women compared to bisexual men. 2.8 million bisexual women experienced their first case of sexual abuse before they were 18 years old, 1.2 million reporting their first attack at age 10 or younger.

=== Emotional and psychological violence ===
Bisexual women face higher rates of coercive control (i.e., threats, withholding funds, and isolation) from an intimate partner (69.7%) when compared to lesbians (60.6%) and heterosexuals (45.1%). 44% of bisexual women faced expressive aggression, defined as insults and humiliation, while 36.3% lesbians and 28.8% of heterosexuals did. Bisexual women reported higher rates of stalking than lesbians or heterosexuals. 54.2% of bisexual women reported being stalked at some point in their lives, with 35.0% of lesbian women and 30.2% heterosexual women reporting the same. Overall, the majority of bisexual women reported having majority male stalkers (80%), with few reporting both male and female perpetrators (13.5%).

== Crime statistics ==
According to the Federal Bureau of Investigation's 2019 hate crime statistics report, of the 8,812 single-bias incidents reported,1,429 were targeted based on their sexual orientation. Among the 1,429 targeted, 1.9% incidents were specifically anti-bisexual. 61.8% were reported to be anti-gay and 10% were anti-lesbian, while only 1.3% were anti-heterosexual. A hate crime, which is one of many forms of victimization, intentionally singles out a victim based on real or perceived identities.

== See also ==
- Sapphobia
