= Heteroflexibility =

Mostly heterosexual orientation with some homosexual attraction

Heteroflexibility is a form of sexual orientation or situational sexual behavior characterized by minimal homosexual attraction in an otherwise primarily heterosexual orientation, which may or may not distinguish it from bisexuality. It has been characterized as "mostly straight". Although sometimes equated with bi-curiosity to describe a broad continuum of sexual orientation between heterosexuality and bisexuality, other authors distinguish heteroflexibility as lacking the "wish to experiment with ... sexuality" implied by the bi-curious label.

The corresponding situation in which homosexual attraction predominates has also been described, termed homoflexibility.

Heteroflexible pride flag

== Prevalence ==
National surveys in Canada and the United States as of 2012 show that three to four percent of male teenagers, when given the choice to select a term that best describes their sexual feelings, desires, and behaviors, opt for "mostly" or "predominantly" heterosexual. With "100% heterosexual" being the largest assumed identity, "mostly-heterosexual" was the first runner up in self-identification. Of the 160 men interviewed for a study in 2008 and 2009, nearly one in eight reported same-sex attractions, fantasies, and crushes. The majority had these feelings since high school; a few others developed them more recently. And in a national sample of young men whose average age was 22, the "mostly straight" proportion increased when they completed the same survey six years later. An even higher percentage of post-high-school young-adult men in the U.S. and in a handful of other countries (including New Zealand and Norway) make the same choice.

An analytical review article looking at the experiences and meanings of same-sex sexual encounters among men and women who identify as heterosexual found that a large portion of same-sex encounters occur among those who identify as heterosexual. The prevalence of same-sex sexuality among heterosexually identifying men and women is not universal. 13.6% of women and 4.6% of men reported attraction to members of the same sex, while 12.6% of women and 2.8% of men have at some point had a same-sex sexual encounter. Findings from the National Survey of Family Growth data from 2011 to 2015 revealed another insight into how much same-sex attraction and behavior can be accounted for by heterosexually identifying people. They found that 61.9% of women and 59% of men with currently reported same-sex attractions identified as heterosexual. Similarly, 65.2% of women and 43.4% of men who have engaged in same-sex sexual encounters identify as heterosexual.

== Research and views ==
As of 2010, most studies of heteroflexibility have focused on young men and women, especially white women in the college environment. Research suggesting the influence of prenatal androgen exposure on female sexual identity places heteroflexibility on a continuum with bisexuality and lesbianism. Other studies have focused on social origins for the behavior, such as the shifting media presentation of bisexuality or the "socialization of the male interloper fantasy" in which a man is invited into a lesbian relationship as a third partner.

Unlike "bisexual until graduation" and similar pejoratives, heteroflexibility is typically considered to have a positive connotation, and is often a self-applied label, although the use of the term as a pop-culture slur has been attested.

Social scientists Hoy and London point out that some men who have sex with men (MSM) nevertheless identify as heterosexual. They may feel that occasional sex with men is a result of female unavailability, or that their same-sex attraction is infrequent enough to not affect their identity. They may claim that while they feel romantically, physically, and emotionally attracted to women, their attraction to men is purely sexual, lacking any emotional attraction. A heteroflexible management strategy for these men is to interpret their sexual practices with women to be more important than their sexual encounters with men; they may also see themselves as masculine while associating a same-sex-attracted identity with femininity. Some of the men and women who experience same-sex encounters while identifying as heterosexual do so to avoid the negative social consequences that come with identifying as a member of the LGBTQ community.

There may be a difference between sexes as to why one may have same-sex sexual encounters while identifying as heterosexual. Some men who have sex with other men that identify as heterosexual may describe themselves as hypersexual and are primarily focused on having sex, with less regard for who they are having sex with. Some men may find that having sex with men is more accessible and less complicated than having sex with women. Conversely, in studies of young heterosexual women at college parties, particularly where women kiss each other, it has been seen that their reasons for this are external, such as the male attention, shock value, and alcohol.

There is some research on why people may identify as heterosexual despite having same-sex encounters. Most people in this category may reject any other label than heterosexual. This may be the same reason they avoid being labeled as bisexual. Some people recognize that they do not represent exclusive heterosexuality and will instead use other descriptors of heterosexuality. These descriptors may help explain for some that their heterosexuality is elastic and that having same-sex sexual encounters would not make one not heterosexual. Some of these people, particularly men, will use these descriptors to enforce heteronormativity. Such descriptors may enforce homophobia and misogyny. Other descriptors enforce a dichotomy of masculinity and femininity, where they are masculine. For many, the idea that someone could identify as heterosexual yet have same-sex encounters is confusing. It cannot be neatly categorized in the same way other sexualities can. Some people believe they can identify as heterosexual because there is no emotion or attraction in same-sex sexual encounters, although not everyone agrees.

== In the media ==
Most media representation of heteroflexibility is focused on heterosexual women experimenting with their sexuality. Typically, these representations are for male viewers, almost exclusively involving women. The women may clarify they are not lesbians. More often, these relationships are viewed from a view of heterosexuality. In an analysis of two magazines over 40 years, Cleo and Cosmopolitan, there was a change in how these magazines represent lesbianism. From 1983 to 1993, the magazines had noticeably changed to a more celebratory representation of lesbianism. Between 1993 and 2003, this representation became focused on the eroticism of same-sex attraction. Between 2003 and 2013, the focus moved from eroticism to sexless and playful. These magazines have increased their representation of female same-sex attraction while increasingly viewing it from a heterosexual view, where female same-sex attraction is not about sex but little more than a sexless flirtation by heterosexuals or a performance by heterosexuals to get the attention of males.

Representation of heteroflexibility in media is often used to show that the piece is LGBT-inclusive while keeping the narrative's focus on heterosexuality. A popular plot twist is that a heterosexual female character is willing to engage in same-sex intimacy, just for a kiss or a night. This plot twist and similar plot lines featuring heteroflexibility mainly involve women. The media franchise, Buffy the Vampire Slayer, has a heteroflexible storyline in its comic book where the main character, Buffy, has a relationship with a female soldier. After the female soldier declares her love to Buffy, they eventually have a night together. Despite this, Buffy ends the relationship almost immediately. Buffy was written in the comics to be an open-minded heterosexual woman, that intimacy with other women happens, but can never be anything more. In Crazy Ex-Girlfriend, the protagonist Rebecca's actions are primarily motivated by an obsessive attachment to her ex-boyfriend Josh, although she occasionally hints at attraction to women, and at one point, she describes herself as a 1.8 on the Kinsey scale. Media has also included representation of heteroflexibility in male characters as well, for example Bob Belcher of the animated series Bob's Burgers, who described himself as "mostly straight" in the episode "Turkey in a Can" and expressed fleeting interest in other men in other episodes of the show.
