= Chicken (gay slang) =

Slang for a young-appearing gay man

Chicken is used, usually by gay men referring to other gay men, to mean a young gay man or young-appearing gay man.

Author Bruce Rodgers defines the term as "1. any boy under the age of consent, heterosexual, fair of face, and unfamiliar with homosexuality ("So many chickens were flapping around that I thought we were touring Colonel Sanders' plantation”) 2. juvenile, youthful, young-looking." Others have defined it as a young man who engages in sex for money or favors.

In the subculture of the gay community who used handkerchiefs or bandanas as a code, people who identify as "chicken" wear a Kewpie doll in their left back pocket. Those who are interested in young men—referred to as chickenhawks—are denoted in the hanky code as wearing one on the right.

David Henry Sterry, a former prostitute turned actor and director, titled his 2002 memoir, Chicken: Self-Portrait of a Young Man for Rent. Author Philip Herbst traces its origin to the 19th century, where it was used to describe the youngest sailors on a ship, who were often used for sexual purposes.

== See also ==
- Twink
- Polari, British language of gay slang
- The Chickens and the Bulls
