= Situational sexual behavior =

Sexual behavior that differs from what a person normally exhibits

Situational sexual behavior is a type of sexual behavior that differs from behavior that the person normally exhibits, due to a social environment that in some way permits, encourages, or compels the behavior in question. This can include situations where a person's preferred sexual behavior may not be possible, so rather than refraining from sexual activity completely, they may engage in substitute sexual behaviors.

== Overview ==
One example of situation-specific sexual behavior would be a person who self-identifies as heterosexual, but will sexually interact with a member of the same sex when lacking other opportunities, such as among soldiers, among prison inmates, among college students, or in similar single-sex communities and institutions. Likewise, a person who self-identifies as gay or lesbian (either at the time, or later) may sexually interact with a member of the opposite sex if a same-sex relationship seems unfeasible.

Some people change their sexual behavior depending on the situation or at different points in their life. For example, some men and women in a university may engage in bisexual activities, but only in that environment. Experimentation of this sort is more common among adolescents and young adults, both male and female. Some colloquialisms for this trend include "heteroflexible", "BUG" (Bisexual Until Graduation), or "LUG" (Lesbian Until Graduation).

In prison, heterosexual-identified men who have sex with men view their homosexual acts as being "situation specific" and may not consider themselves bisexual. These men often describe how they imagine being with a woman while taking part in sexual activity with a male inmate. During masturbation, they picture past sexual experiences with women. They take part in homosexual activity due to having no "heterosexual outlets".

In some cultures, sexual relationships with women were unobtainable for many men, because women were sequestered and strictly forbidden from engaging in extramarital sex. This may have resulted in higher numbers of men, especially unmarried men, engaging in homosexual behavior. Examples of this include pederasty in ancient Greece and bacha bazi in Afghanistan.

Recent Western surveys have found that about 87% of women and 93% of men identify themselves as "completely heterosexual". An analysis of 67 studies found that the lifetime prevalence of sex between men (regardless of orientation) was 3–5% for East Asia, 6–12% for South and South East Asia, 6-15% for Eastern Europe, and 6–20% for Latin America. The World Health Organization estimates a worldwide prevalence of men who have sex with men between 3 and 16%.

== See also ==
- Homosexual panic
- Prison sexuality
- Sex tourism
- Situational offender
- Sociosexuality
- Gay chicken
