= Chicken Hawk: Men Who Love Boys =

- Directed by: Adi Sideman
- Written by: Adi Sideman; Nadav Harel
- Produced by: Adi Sideman
- Narrated by: Barbara Adler; Mimi Turner
- Cinematography: Nadav Harel
- Edited by: Nadav Harel
- Distributed by: Stranger than Fiction
- Release date: July 8, 1994
- Running time: 55 minutes
- Country: United States
- Language: English

Chicken Hawk: Men Who Love Boys (also known as simply Chickenhawk) is a 1994 American documentary film produced, written, and directed by Adi Sideman, who founded YouNow in 2011. The film profiles members of the pedophile/pederasty organization North American Man/Boy Love Association (NAMBLA) who discuss sexual relationships between men and boys below the age of consent.

The film is an exposé of the group's controversial beliefs and its members' clandestine lifestyles. Sideman's evenhanded approach provides the audience with an insight into the group members' psyches. It has drawn attention for its unique approach: letting its subjects, the NAMBLA members, incriminate themselves in a public forum. Since its release, the film has been screened for the FBI, university criminology departments, and other law enforcement agencies.

On September 21, 2012, Sideman attended a screening of Chicken Hawk in Philadelphia, where he did a Q&A after the movie. During the Q&A, he claims he went to the home of a professor of English at Boston University that was supposedly "a leader of NAMBLA" and a "leader of the gay movement". After admitting to the professor that he was molested by a man when he was a child, the professor told Sideman to leave. He was not included in the final cut of the film, and the professor continued to work at the university.

The term "chickenhawk" is used in gay slang to refer to an older man who chases after younger males.

== Synopsis ==
The documentary describes the organization and recounts its history by way of outspoken NAMBLA members Leland Stevenson, Renato Corazza, Peter Melzer, and Chuck Dodson, who expound upon and offer justifications for their feelings toward boys.

Early in the film, a cadre of NAMBLA members attends the 1993 March on Washington for Lesbian, Gay and Bi Equal Rights and Liberation to argue for inclusion in the gay rights movement, a demand which is initially met with disapproval from parade-goers.

In other scenes, photographs from the NAMBLA Bulletin are shown depicting shirtless or otherwise sexually positioned boys, as well as drawings of winged boys without clothes; Stevenson recounts a sexual encounter in which he received oral sex from a boy as nothing less than a "religious experience"; an unremarkable interaction occurs between Stevenson and a boy, after which Stevenson expresses his certainty that the boy was "flirting" with him; a schoolteacher admits to recently losing his job due to his membership in NAMBLA; several threatening messages are left on another member's answering machine.

Poet and free speech advocate Allen Ginsberg, NAMBLA's most famous member and defender, appears in the documentary and reads a "graphic ode to youth".

== Release and reception ==
The film was released to critical acclaim. The premiere at the New York Underground Film Festival was met with fanfare and covered by national news organizations as well as shock jocks like Howard Stern.

The film was well-received by the anti-NAMBLA groups "Straight Kids USA" and "National Traditionalist Caucus," both of which were represented in the film. Tom McDonough, from Straight Kids USA, stated, "We feel everybody should see this movie because it exposes NAMBLA for all the evil they are", and Don Rosenberg of the National Traditionalist Caucus said, "We thought the movie was very fair. I think Adi did a very good job of letting Leyland Stevenson (the film's central character) and his cohorts hang themselves."

According to New York Newsday's reviewer, "It would have been too easy to become strident, had he [Sideman] set out to make an agitprop piece about the evils of pedophilia. So he lets NAMBLA bury itself. And the organization obliges."

Since its release, the film has been screened for psychology, sociology, and criminology departments throughout the US and for the FBI.

The film's distributor, Stranger than Fiction, was run by Todd Phillips, who founded the New York Underground Film Festival and later went on to produce The Hangover films, Due Date, and Joker.

== See also ==
- Age-of-consent reform
