= Lesbian until graduation =

LGBT slang term

The LGBT slang terms lesbian until graduation (LUG), gay until graduation (GUG), and bisexual until graduation (BUG) are used to describe primarily women of high school or college age who are assumed to be experimenting with or adopting a temporary lesbian or bisexual identity, but who will ultimately adopt a heterosexual identity.

== Usage ==
In a 1999 article in the Seattle Weekly, A. Davis related her experimentation with same-sex relationships, and how as a result, she experienced hostility from lesbian friends who pressured her to identify as a bisexual, including one friend who urged her to do so as a political statement, despite the fact that Davis identifies as a heterosexual who merely experimented with women for a brief period. Davis said that women who experienced same-sex relationships are more attuned to LGBTQ issues, and more likely to oppose discrimination. She also said that if the same degree of acceptance were extended to men who experimented with homosexuality, it would promote greater acceptance of the LGBTQ community.

== See also ==
- Biphobia
- Class S (genre)
- Mixed-orientation marriage
- Questioning
