= Chickenhawk (gay slang) =

Older gay man who prefers younger males for partners

A chickenhawk or chicken hawk is slang used in American and British gay culture to denote older males who prefer younger males for partners, who may less often be called "chickens", i.e., the prey of the chickenhawk. Other variations include chicken queen and chicken plucker.

It is sometimes used as a disparaging vulgarity within the LGBTQ community, or seen as a slur against people in that community. The label can be applied to a man who seeks partners with the look of someone young, regardless of their target's age.

"Chickenhawk" also indicates a man who uses underage boys for his sexual pleasure. The usage was publicized by members of the controversial group NAMBLA in the 1994 documentary film Chicken Hawk: Men Who Love Boys, although Time magazine reported it in this sense in 1975.

The use and significance of this term have been the subject of academic discussions and popular reports.

== See also ==
- Age disparity in sexual relationships
- Cougar (slang)
- Troll (gay slang)
- Chicken (gay slang)
