= Heterosexuality =

Attraction between people of the opposite sex or gender

A heterosexuality symbol

Heterosexuality is romantic attraction, sexual attraction, or sexual behavior between people of the opposite sex or gender. As a sexual orientation, heterosexuality is "an enduring pattern of emotional, romantic, and/or sexual attractions" to people of the opposite sex. It "also refers to a person's sense of identity based on those attractions, related behaviors, and membership in a community of others who share those attractions." Someone who is heterosexual is commonly referred to as straight.

Along with bisexuality and homosexuality, heterosexuality is one of the three main categories of sexual orientation within the heterosexual–homosexual continuum. Across cultures, most people are heterosexual, and heterosexual activity is by far the most common type of sexual activity. Heterosexuality has mostly been viewed as the normative and most socially dominant form of sexual orientation.

Scientists do not know the exact cause of sexual orientation, but they theorize that it is caused by a complex interplay of genetic, hormonal, and environmental influences, and do not view it as a choice. Although no single theory on the cause of sexual orientation has yet gained widespread support, scientists favor biologically based theories. There is considerably more evidence supporting nonsocial, biological causes of sexual orientation than social ones, especially for males.

The term heterosexual or heterosexuality is usually applied to humans, but heterosexual behavior is observed in all other mammals and in other animals, as it is necessary for sexual reproduction.

== Terminology ==
Hetero- comes from the Greek word ἕτερος [héteros], meaning "other party" or "another", used in science as a prefix meaning "different"; and the Latin word for sex (that is, characteristic sex or sexual differentiation).

The current use of the term heterosexual has its roots in the broader 19th century tradition of personality taxonomy. The term heterosexual was coined alongside the word homosexual by Karl Maria Kertbeny in 1869. The terms were not in current use during the late nineteenth century, but were reintroduced by Richard von Krafft-Ebing and Albert Moll around 1890. The noun came into wider use from the early 1920s, but did not enter common use until the 1960s. The colloquial shortening "hetero" is attested from 1933. The abstract noun "heterosexuality" is first recorded in 1900. The word "heterosexual" was listed in Merriam-Webster's New International Dictionary in 1923 as a medical term for "morbid sexual passion for one of the opposite sex"; however, in 1934 in their Second Edition Unabridged it is defined as a "manifestation of sexual passion for one of the opposite sex; normal sexuality".

Hyponyms of heterosexual include heteroflexible.

The word can be informally shortened to "hetero". The term straight originated as a mid-20th century gay slang term for heterosexuals, ultimately coming from the phrase "to go straight" (as in "straight and narrow"), or stop engaging in homosexual sex. One of the first uses of the word in this way was in 1941 by author G. W. Henry. Henry's book concerned conversations with homosexual males and used this term in connection with people who are identified as ex-gays. It is now simply a colloquial term for "heterosexual", having changed in primary meaning over time. Some object to usage of the term straight because it implies that non-heterosexual people are crooked.

== Demographics ==
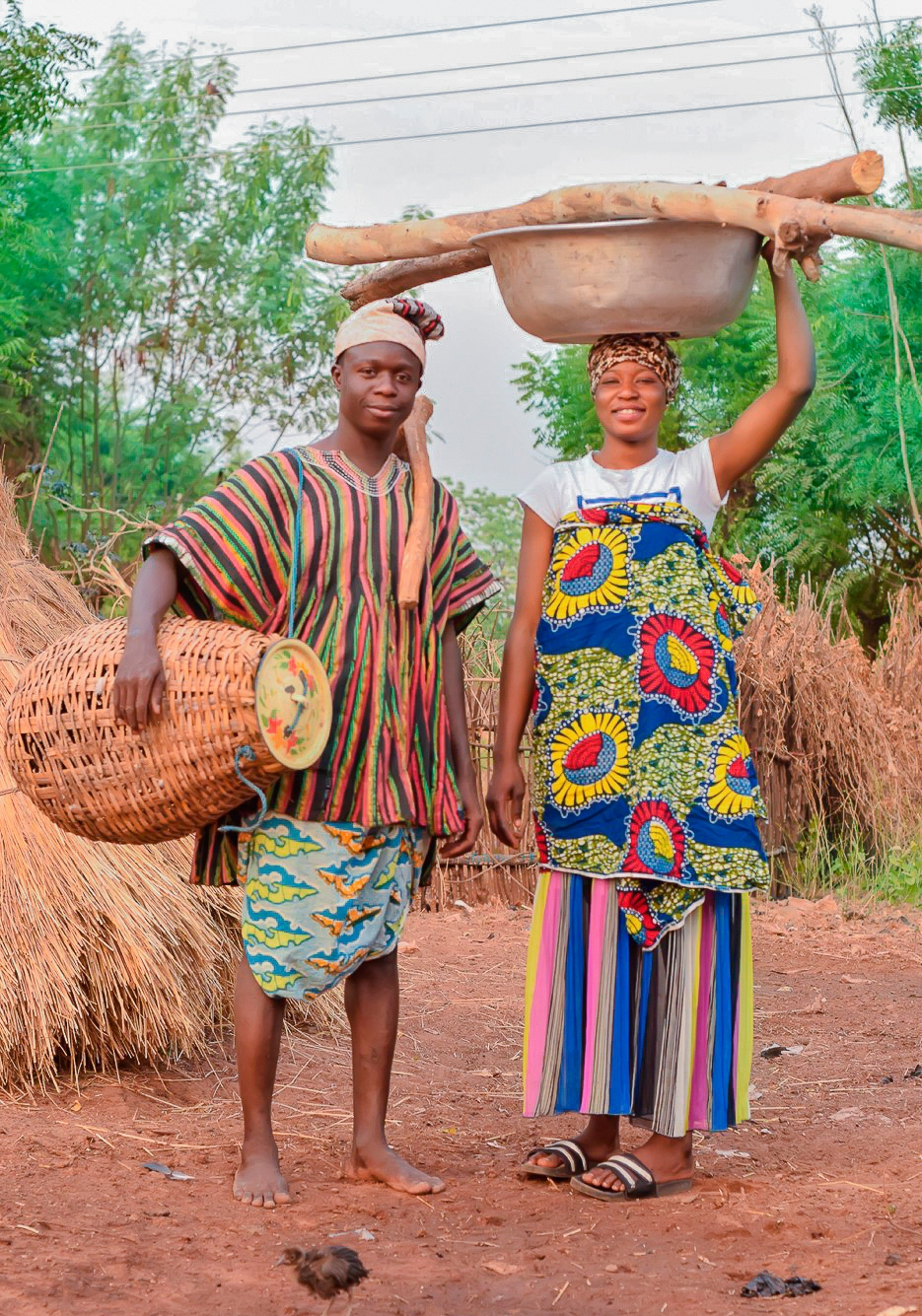
A straight couple

In their 2016 literature review, Bailey et al. stated that they "expect that in all cultures the vast majority of individuals are sexually predisposed exclusively to the other sex (i.e., heterosexual)" and that there is no persuasive evidence that the demographics of sexual orientation have varied much across time or place. Heterosexual activity between only one male and one female is by far the most common type of sociosexual activity.

According to several major studies, 89% to 98% of people have had only heterosexual contact within their lifetime; but this percentage falls to 79–84% when either or both same-sex attraction and behavior are reported.

A 1992 study reported that 93.9% of males in Britain have only had heterosexual experience, while in France the number was reported at 95.9%. According to a 2008 poll, 85% of Britons have only opposite-sex sexual contact while 94% of Britons identify themselves as heterosexual. Similarly, a survey by the UK Office for National Statistics (ONS) in 2010 found that 95% of Britons identified as heterosexual, 1.5% of Britons identified themselves as homosexual or bisexual, and the last 3.5% gave more vague answers such as "don't know", "other", or did not respond to the question. In the United States, according to a Williams Institute report in April 2011, 96% or approximately 250 million of the adult population are heterosexual.

An October 2012 Gallup poll provided unprecedented demographic information about those who identify as heterosexual, arriving at the conclusion that 96.6%, with a margin of error of ±1%, of all U.S. adults identify as heterosexual. The Gallup results show:

Age/Gender	Heterosexual	Non-heterosexual	Don't know/Refused
18–29	90.1%	6.4%	3.5%
30–49	93.6%	3.2%	3.2%
50–64	93.1%	2.6%	4.3%
65+	91.5%	1.9%	6.5%
18–29, Women	88.0%	8.3%	3.8%
18–29, Men	92.1%	4.6%	3.3%

In a 2015 YouGov survey of 1,000 adults of the United States, 89% of the sample identified as heterosexual, 4% as homosexual (2% as homosexual male and 2% as homosexual female) and 4% as bisexual (of either sex).

Bailey et al., in their 2016 review, stated that in recent Western surveys, about 93% of men and 87% of women identify as completely heterosexual, and about 4% of men and 10% of women as mostly heterosexual.

== Academic study ==
=== Biological and environmental ===
No simple and singular determinant for sexual orientation has been conclusively demonstrated, but scientists believe that a combination of genetic, hormonal, and environmental factors determine sexual orientation. They favor biological theories for explaining the causes of sexual orientation, as there is considerably more evidence supporting nonsocial, biological causes than social ones, especially for males.

Factors related to the development of a heterosexual orientation include genes, prenatal hormones, and brain structure, and their interaction with the environment.

==== Prenatal hormones ====
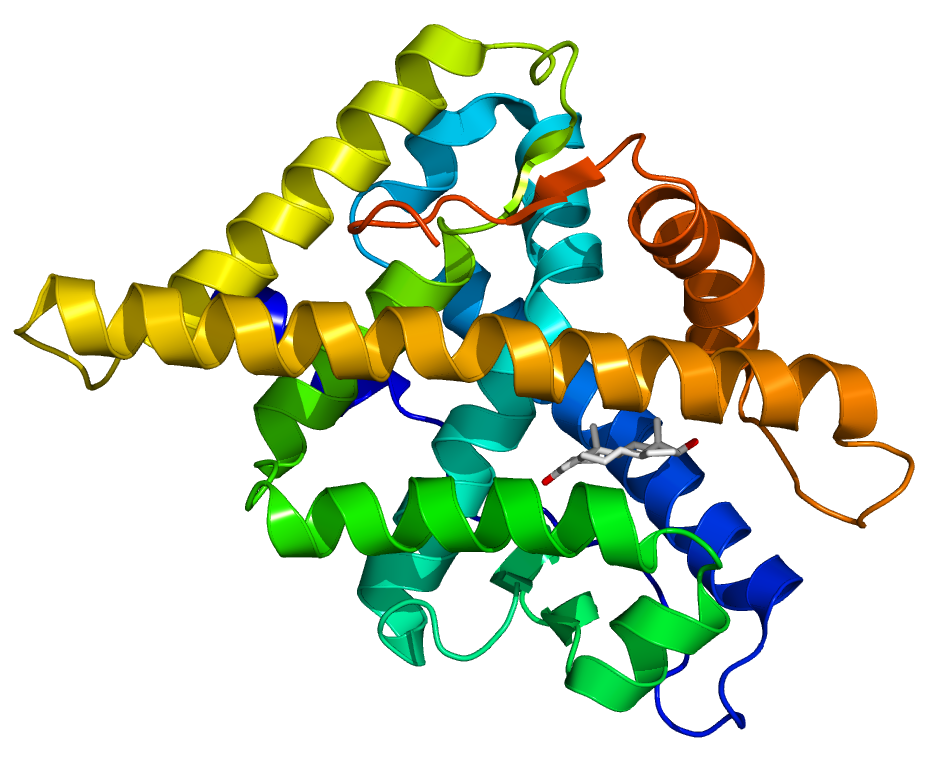
Structure of the androgen receptor (rainbow cartoon) complexed with testosterone (white sticks).

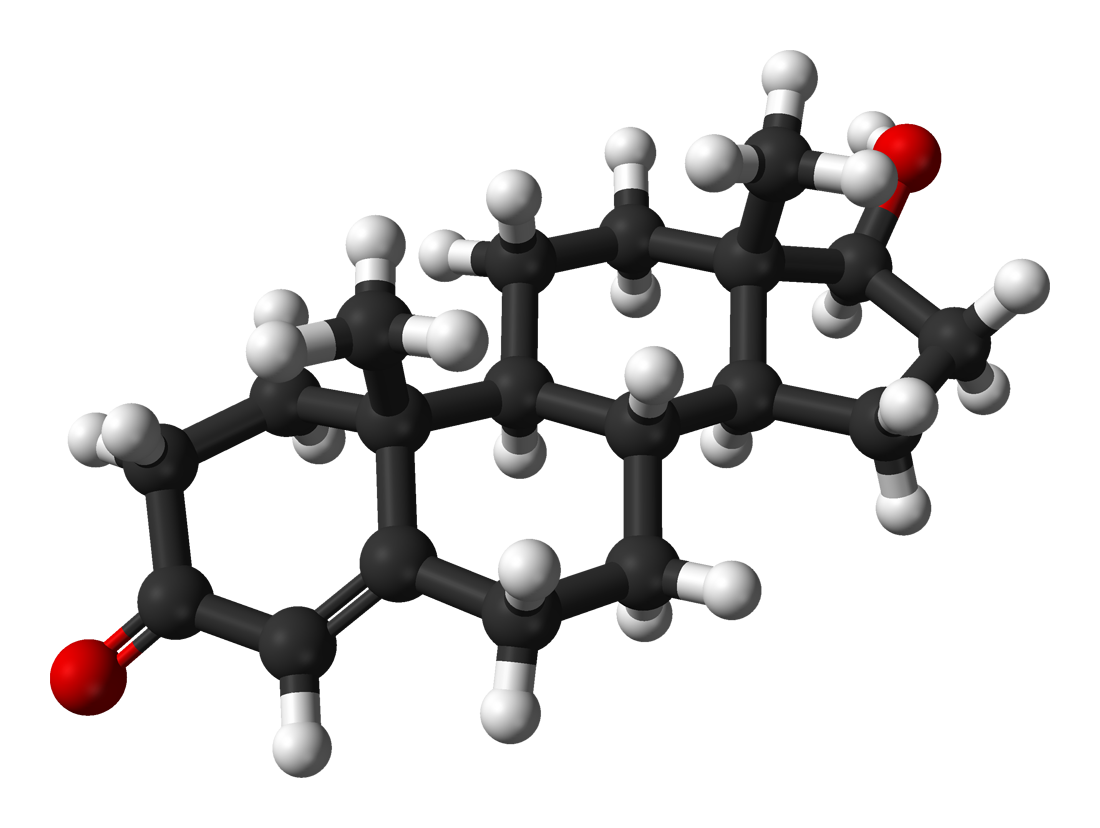
Testosterone contributes to the masculinization of the brain

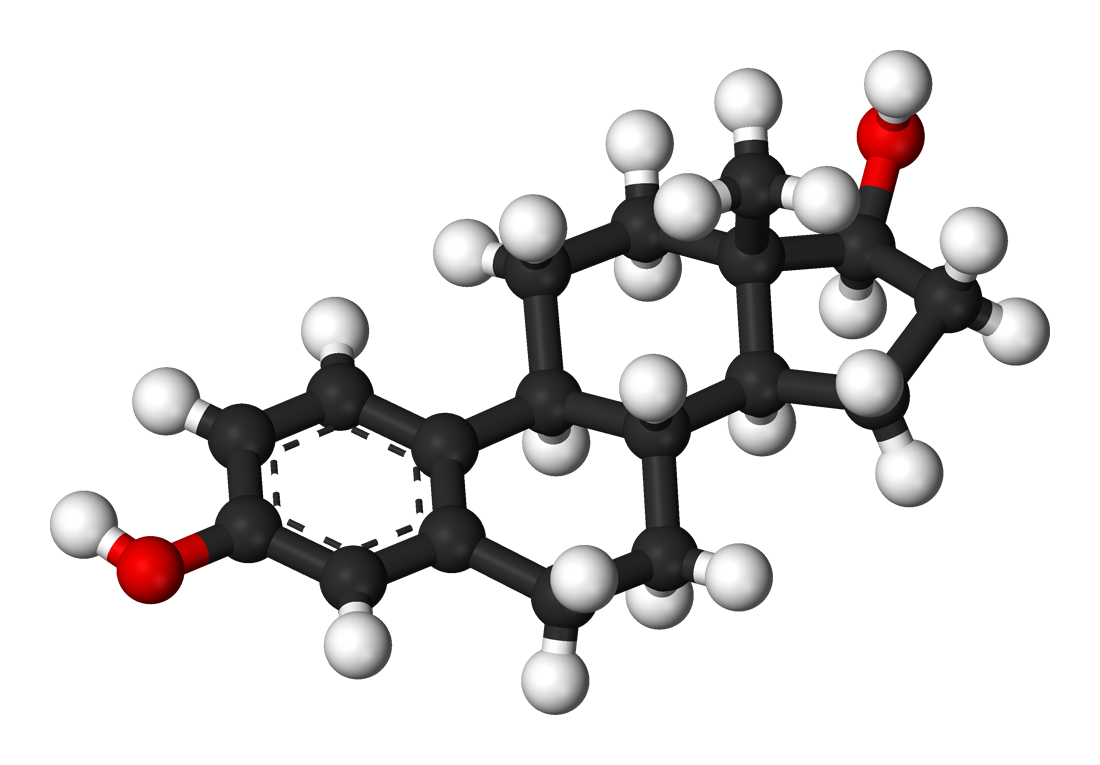
Estradiol also stimulates the androgen receptors.

The neurobiology of the masculinization of the brain is fairly well understood. Estradiol and testosterone, which is catalyzed by the enzyme 5α-reductase into dihydrotestosterone, act upon androgen receptors in the brain to masculinize it. If there are few androgen receptors (people with androgen insensitivity syndrome) or too much androgen (females with congenital adrenal hyperplasia), there can be physical and psychological effects. It has been suggested that both male and female heterosexuality are the results of this process. In these studies heterosexuality in females is linked to a lower amount of masculinization than is found in lesbian females, though when dealing with male heterosexuality there are results supporting both higher and lower degrees of masculinization than homosexual males.

==== Animals and reproduction ====
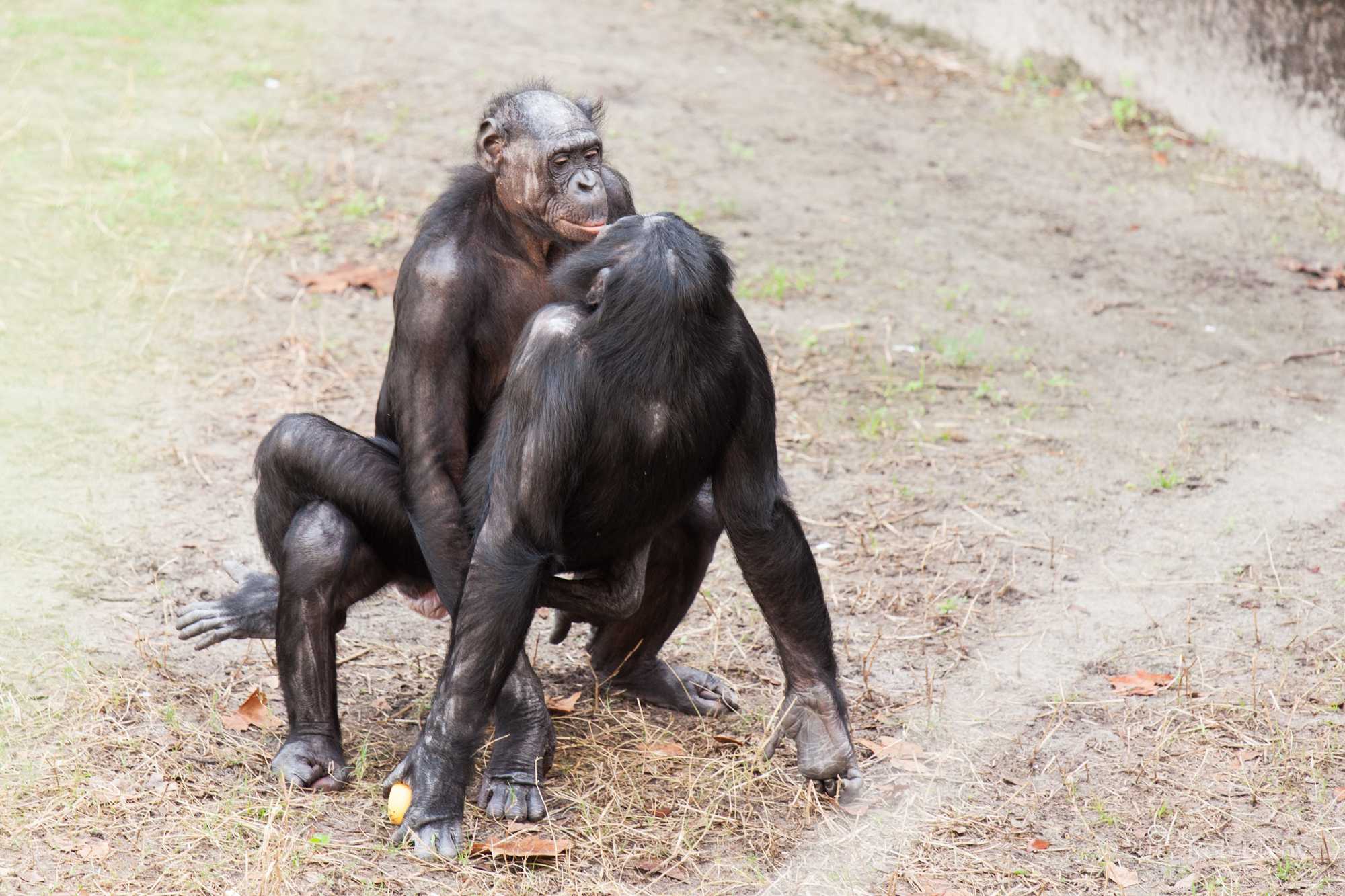
Bonobos mating, Jacksonville Zoo and Gardens.

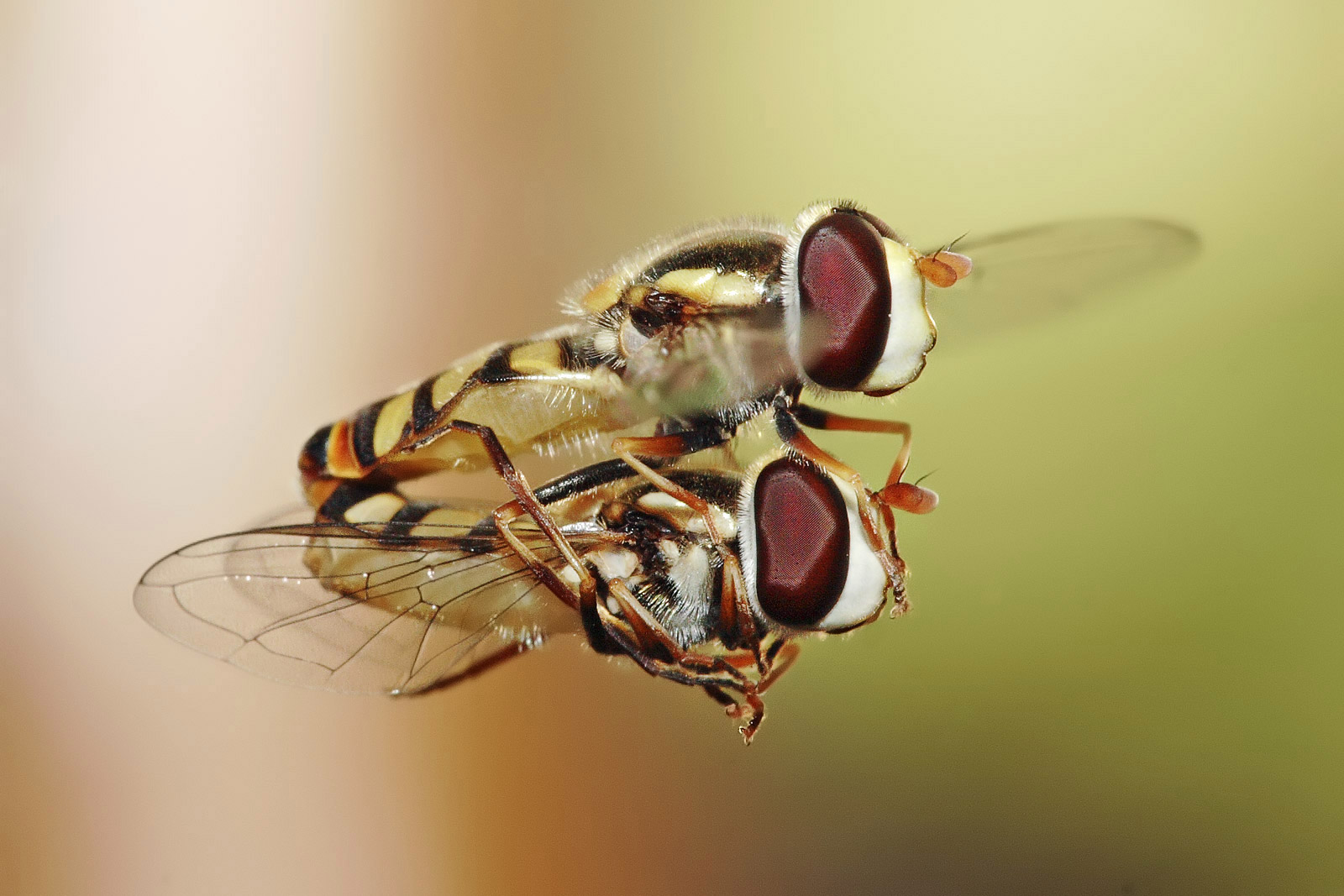
Hoverflies mating in midair flight.

Sexual reproduction in the animal world is facilitated through opposite-sex sexual activity, although there are also animals that reproduce asexually, including protozoa and lower invertebrates.

Reproductive sex does not require a heterosexual orientation, since sexual orientation typically refers to a long-term enduring pattern of sexual and emotional attraction leading often to long-term social bonding, while reproduction requires as little as a single act of copulation to fertilize the ovum by sperm.

=== Sexual fluidity ===
Often, sexual orientation and sexual orientation identity are not distinguished, which can impact accurately assessing sexual identity and whether or not sexual orientation is able to change; sexual orientation identity can change throughout an individual's life, and may or may not align with biological sex, sexual behavior or actual sexual orientation. Sexual orientation is stable and unlikely to change for the vast majority of people, but some research indicates that some people may experience change in their sexual orientation, and this is more likely for women than for men. The American Psychological Association distinguishes between sexual orientation (an innate attraction) and sexual orientation identity (which may change at any point in a person's life).

A 2012 study found that 2% of a sample of 2,560 adult participants reported a change of sexual orientation identity after a 10-year period. For men, a change occurred in 0.78% of those who had identified as heterosexual, 9.52% of homosexuals, and 47% of bisexuals. For women, a change occurred in 1.36% of heterosexuals, 63.6% of lesbians, and 64.7% of bisexuals.

Heteroflexibility is a form of sexual orientation or situational sexual behavior characterized by minimal homosexual activity in an otherwise primarily heterosexual orientation that is considered to distinguish it from bisexuality. It has been characterized as "mostly straight".

=== Identity vs behavior ===
Some researchers observe that behavior and identity sometimes do not match: for instance, some women identify as simultaneously heterosexual and bisexual. Self-identified straight women may have sex with women or self-identified straight men may have sex with men.

=== Sexual orientation change efforts ===
Sexual orientation change efforts are methods that aim to change sexual orientation, used to try to convert homosexual and bisexual people to heterosexuality. Scientists and mental health professionals generally do not believe that sexual orientation is a choice. There are no studies of adequate scientific rigor that conclude that sexual orientation change efforts are effective.

== Society and culture ==
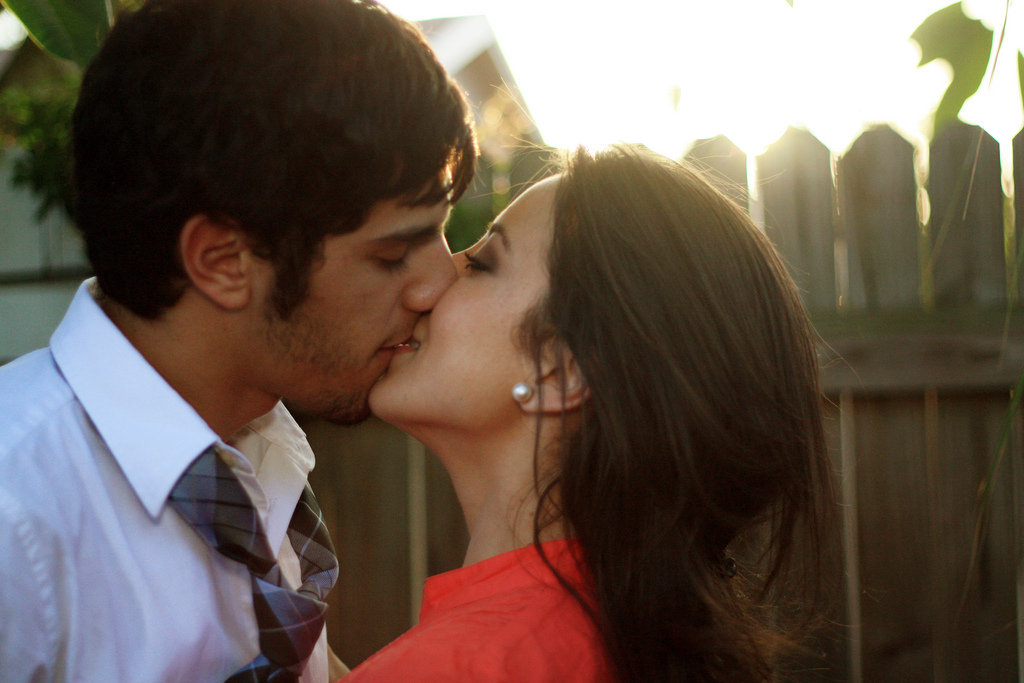
An intimate heterosexual couple

A heterosexual couple, a man and woman in an intimate relationship, form the core of a nuclear family. Many societies throughout history have insisted that a marriage take place before the couple settle down, but enforcement of this rule or compliance with it has varied considerably.

=== Symbolism ===
Heterosexual symbolism dates back to the earliest artifacts of humanity, with gender symbols, ritual fertility carvings, and primitive art. This was later expressed in the symbolism of fertility rites and polytheistic worship, which often included images of human reproductive organs, such as lingam in Hinduism. Modern symbols of heterosexuality in societies derived from European traditions still reference symbols used in these ancient beliefs. One such image is a combination of the symbol for Mars, the Roman god of war, as the definitive male symbol of masculinity, and Venus, the Roman goddess of love and beauty, as the definitive female symbol of femininity. The unicode character for this combined symbol is ⚤ (U+26A4).

=== Historical views ===
There was no need to coin a term such as heterosexual until terms emerged with which it could be compared and contrasted. Jonathan Ned Katz dates the definition of heterosexuality, as it is used today, to the late 19th century. According to Katz, in the Victorian era, sex was seen as a means to achieve reproduction, and relations between the sexes were not believed to be overtly sexual. The body was thought of as a tool for procreation – "Human energy, thought of as a closed and severely limited system, was to be used in producing children and in work, not wasted in libidinous pleasures."

Katz argues that modern ideas of sexuality and eroticism began to develop in America and Germany in the later 19th century. The changing economy and the "transformation of the family from producer to consumer" resulted in shifting values. The Victorian work ethic had changed, pleasure became more highly valued and this allowed ideas of human sexuality to change. Consumer culture had created a market for the erotic, pleasure became commoditized. At the same time medical doctors began to acquire more power and influence. They developed the medical model of "normal love", in which healthy men and women enjoyed sex as part of a "new ideal of male-female relationships that included.. an essential, necessary, normal eroticism." This model also had a counterpart, "the Victorian Sex Pervert", anyone who failed to meet the norm. The basic oppositeness of the sexes was the basis for normal, healthy sexual attraction. "The attention paid the sexual abnormal created a need to name the sexual normal, the better to distinguish the average him and her from the deviant it." The creation of the term heterosexual consolidated the social existence of the pre-existing heterosexual experience and created a sense of ensured and validated normalcy within it.

=== Religious views ===
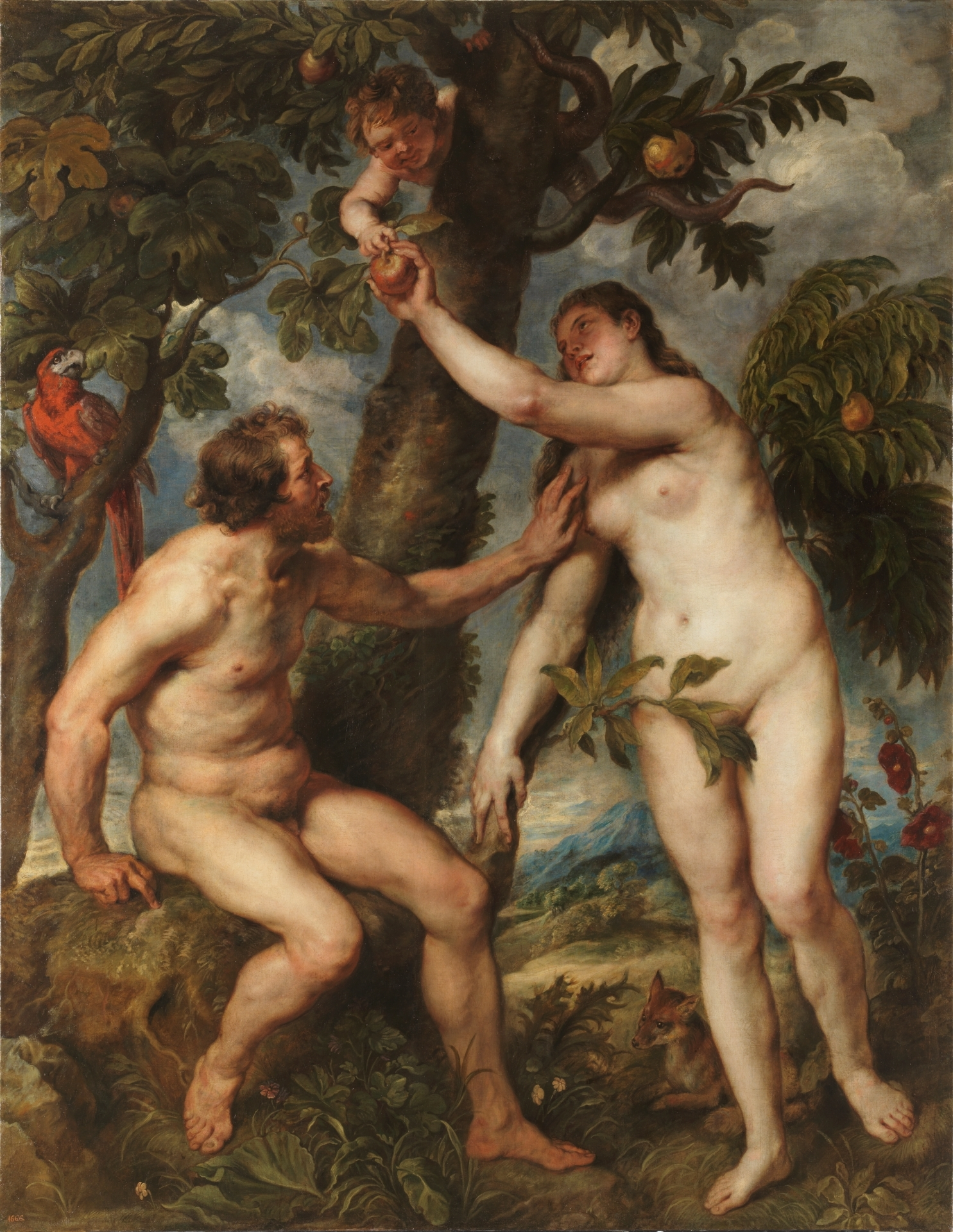
According to the creation myth of the Abrahamic religions, Adam and Eve are the first human couple and the ancestors of all humanity.

The Judeo-Christian tradition has several scriptures related to heterosexuality. The Book of Genesis states that God created women because "It is not good that the man should be alone; I will make him an help meet for him", and that "Therefore shall a man leave his father and his mother, and shall cleave unto his wife: and they shall be one flesh"

For the most part, religious traditions in the world reserve marriage to heterosexual unions, but there are exceptions including certain Buddhist and Hindu traditions, Unitarian Universalists, Metropolitan Community Church, some Anglican dioceses, and some Quaker, United Church of Canada, and Reform and Conservative Jewish congregations.

Almost all religions believe that sex between a man and a woman within marriage is allowed, but there are a few that believe that it is a sin, such as The Shakers, The Harmony Society, and The Ephrata Cloister. These religions tend to view all sexual relations as sinful, and promote celibacy. Some religions require celibacy for certain roles, such as Catholic priests; however, the Catholic Church also views heterosexual marriage as sacred and necessary.

=== Heteronormativity and heterosexism ===
This image is often used on Straight Pride T-shirts

Heteronormativity denotes or relates to a world view that promotes heterosexuality as the normal or preferred sexual orientation for people to have. It can assign strict gender roles to males and females. The term was popularized by Michael Warner in 1991. Feminist Adrienne Rich argues that compulsory heterosexuality, a continual and repeating reassertion of heterosexual norms, is a facet of heterosexism. Compulsory heterosexuality is the idea that female heterosexuality is both assumed and enforced by a patriarchal society. Heterosexuality is then viewed as the natural inclination or obligation by both sexes. Consequently, anyone who differs from the normalcy of heterosexuality is deemed deviant or abhorrent.

Heterosexism is a form of bias or discrimination in favor of opposite-sex sexuality and relationships. It may include an assumption that everyone is heterosexual and may involve various kinds of discrimination against gays, lesbians, bisexuals, asexuals, heteroflexible people, or transgender or non-binary individuals.

Straight pride is a slogan that arose in the late 1980s and early 1990s and has been used primarily by social conservative groups as a political stance and strategy. The term is described as a response to gay pride adopted by various LGBTQ groups in the early 1970s or to the accommodations provided to gay pride initiatives.

== See also ==
- Heterosociality
- Human reproduction
- Cisgender heterosexuality and queer identities
- Gynogenesis
