= Gay lingo =

Gay lingo may refer to several languages spoken by gay communities:

- Swardspeak or Beki language, a cant slang used by gay communities in the Philippines
- Polari, cant slang used in Britain
- Bahasa Binan, an argot spoken by gay communities in Indonesia
- Gayle language, an Afrikaans-based argot spoken by gay communities in South Africa
- IsiNgqumo, an argot based on the Bantu languages spoken by gay communities in South Africa
- Kaliarda, an argot spoken by the gay communities in Greece
- LGBT slang
- Lubunca, an argot used in Turkey
- Lóxoro in Peru

== See also ==
- Lavender linguistics
- Cant
