= Lubunca =

Turkish cant and slang

Lubunca, Labunca or Lubunyaca is a secret Turkish cant and slang used by sex workers and the LGBTQ community in Turkey. The term originated from the root lubni, which is the Romani word for "prostitute".

== Background ==
Lubunca is derived from Romani slang. It also contains words from other languages, including Greek, Arabic, Armenian and French.

Lubunca is an argot of approximately four hundred words and was spoken by the köçeks and tellaks between the 17th and 18th centuries. It was later adopted and developed by transvestites. It is believed that it was developed to avoid persecution while secretly communicating in public areas. It has been in use since the late Ottoman era .

== Examples ==
In Lubunca, manti means 'pleasant' or 'beautiful'. Balamoz describes old males. Madilik means 'evil' and gullüm means 'fun'.

== See also ==
- LGBT slang
- Polari
- Gayle
- Swardspeak
- IsiNgqumo
- Hijra Farsi
- Kaliarda
- Pajubá
- Bahasa Binan
