= Lóxoro =

Lóxoro or húngaro is an argot derived from Spanish and used by a number of trans people, the gay community, and sex workers in Peru. The language uses cryptolalisation to make the language unrecognisable and secret.

== History ==
The language is said to have emerged during the 1960s or 1970s. Its first appearance in the public domain was with the Peruvian comedian Fernando Armas' gay character Fulvio Carmelo.

Lóxoro's usage became better known after the 2012 short Peruvian film Loxoro, written and directed by Claudia Llosa.

== Examples ==
mamá becomes mácuti.

hola becomes hósorolásara/hosolasa.

peches are small gifts to incentivise relationships.

== See also ==
- Gayle language, an Afrikaans-based gay argot
- Lavender linguistics
- Polari, cant slang used in Britain
