= Lavender Languages and Linguistics Conference =

Linguistics conference

Lavender Languages & Linguistics Conference
- Status: Active
- Founded: 1993
- Founders: William Leap

The Lavender Languages and Linguistics Conference is an international conference for LGBT linguistics and other related queer language research and discourse studies. It provides a place for emerging queer linguistics scholarship. The conference is the longest continually running LGBT studies conference in the US.

In 2017 the conference expanded to a Summer Institute with 10 days of class discussion, research opportunities and informal conversations exploring topics of current interest in language and sexuality studies, queer linguistics, and various lavender language themes.

== History ==
The Lavender Languages and Linguistics Conference was founded in 1993 by William Leap to coincide with the March on Washington for Lesbian, Gay and Bi Equal Rights and Liberation. At the time, research on these topics was considered marginal within linguistics, and the conference was a key place for researchers to come together to discuss issues in the field. By the 20th conference, there were over 80 presentations and 150 attendees. The conference was host yearly at American University in Washington, DC until 2017 when the conference began to move each year.

A meta-synthesis of conference abstracts by Paul Baker and published in Milani's chapter in The Oxford Handbook of Language and Society found early work presented at the conference focused on the existence of "gay language" such as Polari and "lesbian language". In line with the trajectory of the field, more recent work has focused on how various linguistic features index different identities.

The Journal of Language and Sexuality (though not officially linked to LavLang) is closely affiliated with the conference. It was an established venue to publish queer linguistics research.

== Conferences ==
Number	Year	Date	Host University	City	Country	Website	Notes
1st	1993	April	American University	Washington, D.C.	United States		
2nd	1994		American University	Washington, D.C.	United States		
3rd	1995		American University	Washington, D.C.	United States		
4th	1996	September	American University	Washington, D.C.	United States		Keynote speakers: Ellen Lewin, Charles Nero, Deborah Tannen, Riki Ann Wilchins
5th	1997		American University	Washington, D.C.	United States		
6th	1998		American University	Washington, D.C.	United States		
7th	1999		American University	Washington, D.C.	United States		
8th	2000		American University	Washington, D.C.	United States		
9th	2002	February	American University	Washington, D.C.	United States		
11th	2003		American University	Washington, D.C.	United States		
12th	2004		American University	Washington, D.C.	United States		
13th	2005		American University	Washington, D.C.	United States		
14th	2006		American University	Washington, D.C.	United States		
15th	2008		American University	Washington, D.C.	United States		
16th	2009	February	American University	Washington, D.C.	United States		Plenaries: Aren Aizura and Mary Weismantel
17th	2010	April	American University	Washington, D.C.	United States		Plenaries/Special Presentations: Gibran Guido, Ellen Lewin, Andrew Tucker
18th	2011	February	American University	Washington, D.C.	United States		Plenaries: Scott Kiesling, Carlos Decena, Sharif Mowlabocus
19th	2012	February	American University	Washington, D.C.	United States		Special Events: Reporting and Writing Queer Temporalities (Panel discussion); Voices from a Chorus(featuring Paula Bresnan Gibson); 1 Girl, 5 Gays and LGBTQ Discourses in School Settings (featuring Philip Tetro); A Reading from “The Bar Notebook” (featuring Bonnie Morris)
20th	2013	February	American University	Washington, D.C.	United States		Special Events: Master Class with Tom Boellstorff; 20th Annual Conference Reception with AU Pride
21st	2014	February	American University	Washington, D.C.	United States		Special Events: Critical Discourse Analysis Workshop with David Peterson; Premier of Reinterpreting Bukovac (A Documentary Film); “American Orientation: Interpellation of the Gay Male Subject in Literary Narratives in Taiwan” with Ta-Wei Chi
22nd	2015	February	American University	Washington, D.C.	United States		Plenary: Rusty Barrett
23nd	2016	February	American University	Washington, D.C.	United States		
24th	2017	April	University of Nottingham	Nottingham	United Kingdom		Keynote speakers: Dr Helen Sauntson, York St John University (UK) and Professor Paul Baker, Lancaster University (UK).
25th	2018	April	Rhode Island College	Providence, Rhode Island	United States		Keynote speakers: Mie Hiramoto (National University of Singapore) Margot Weiss (Wesleyan University) and Lal Zimman (University of California, Santa Barbara).
26th	2019	May	University of Gothenburg	Gothenburg	Sweden		Keynote Speakers: Erika Alm, University of Gothenburg, Sweden Mons Bissenbakker, University of Copenhagen, Denmark, Rodrigo Borba, Federal University of Rio de Janeiro, Brazil, Holly Cashman, University of New Hampshire, USA, Thabo Msibi, University of KwaZulu-Natal, South Africa
27th	2021	May	California Institute of Integral Studies	San Francisco	United States		Keynote speakers: Jack Halberstam, Columbia University and Elizabeth Freeman, University of California at Davis Originally planned to be hosted in 2020 in San Francisco at California Institute of Integral Studies, the conference was postpoponed due to the COVID-19 pandemic and eventually moved to an online format in 2021.
28th	2022	May	University of Catania	Catania	Italy	[5]	Keynote speakers: J Calder, Adriana Di Stefano, Busi Makoni, Pietro Maturi, Tommaso M. Milani, Eva Nossem
29th	2023	March	Boise State University	Boise	United States		Keynote speakers: Nikki Lane, Luhui Whitebear, and a Plenary Roundtable "Lavender Languages Past, Present, and Future"
30th	2024	August	University of Brighton	Brighton	England		Keynote Speakers: William Leap, Jenny Davis, Veronika Koller
31st	2025	August	Manchester Metropolitan University	Manchester	England		Keynote Speakers: Heiko Motschenbacher, Federica Formato, Lucy Jones, Kat Gupta, Alon Lischinsky
32nd	2026	September	The University of Edinburgh	Edinburgh	Scotland		Keynote Speakers: Erez Levon, Nikki Lane, Stamatina Katsiveli, Kevin Guyan, Eddy Ungless

== Lavender Languages Summer Institute ==
The Lavender Language Institute, a summer program that Leap founded at Florida Atlantic University in 2017, offers training in queer linguistics to undergraduates, grad students, and others interested in language and sexuality studies.

Number	Year	Date	Host University	City	State	Notes
1st	2018	June	Florida Atlantic University	Boca Raton	Florida	
2nd	2019	June	Florida Atlantic University	Boca Raton	Florida	
3rd	2021	June	Florida Atlantic University			Originally planned to be hosted in 2020 in person at Florida Atlantic University the conference was postponed due to the COVID-19 pandemic and eventually moved to an online format in 2021.
4th	2022	June	Florida Atlantic University			
5th	2023	June	Florida Atlantic University			
6th	2024	June	California Institute of Integral Studies			
8th	2026	June	California Institute of Integral Studies			
