= Troll (gay slang) =

Gay slang term for men who cruise for sex

Troll and trolling are slang terms used almost exclusively among gay men to characterize gay, bisexual and questioning or bi-curious men who cruise or "wander about looking" for sex or potential sex partners or experiences "in a notably wanton manner and with lessened standards of what one will accept in a partner." The term can be used positively or negatively depending on the speaker, usage and intent and can describe the person or the activity. Although often referring to "an unattractive older gay man" and although troll as a slur "is primarily a visual, not a behavioral" judgment, the phrases can be used for anyone who is trolling, regardless of the putative troll's age or perceived attractiveness.

== Pejorative use ==
As a verb, "to troll" is not necessarily pejorative, with "trolling for sex" merely a synonym of cruising.

The same is not true of "troll" as a noun describing a person, usually an elderly or unattractive gay male (a "troll") aggressively seeking younger partners ("twinks" or "chickens"). This usage carries all of the negative connotations associated with "dirty old man" outside the gay community; editorialists in the gay press also occasionally cite this usage as evidence that a gay community which values youth and physical attraction is marginalising its elderly.

== Origin and historical usage ==
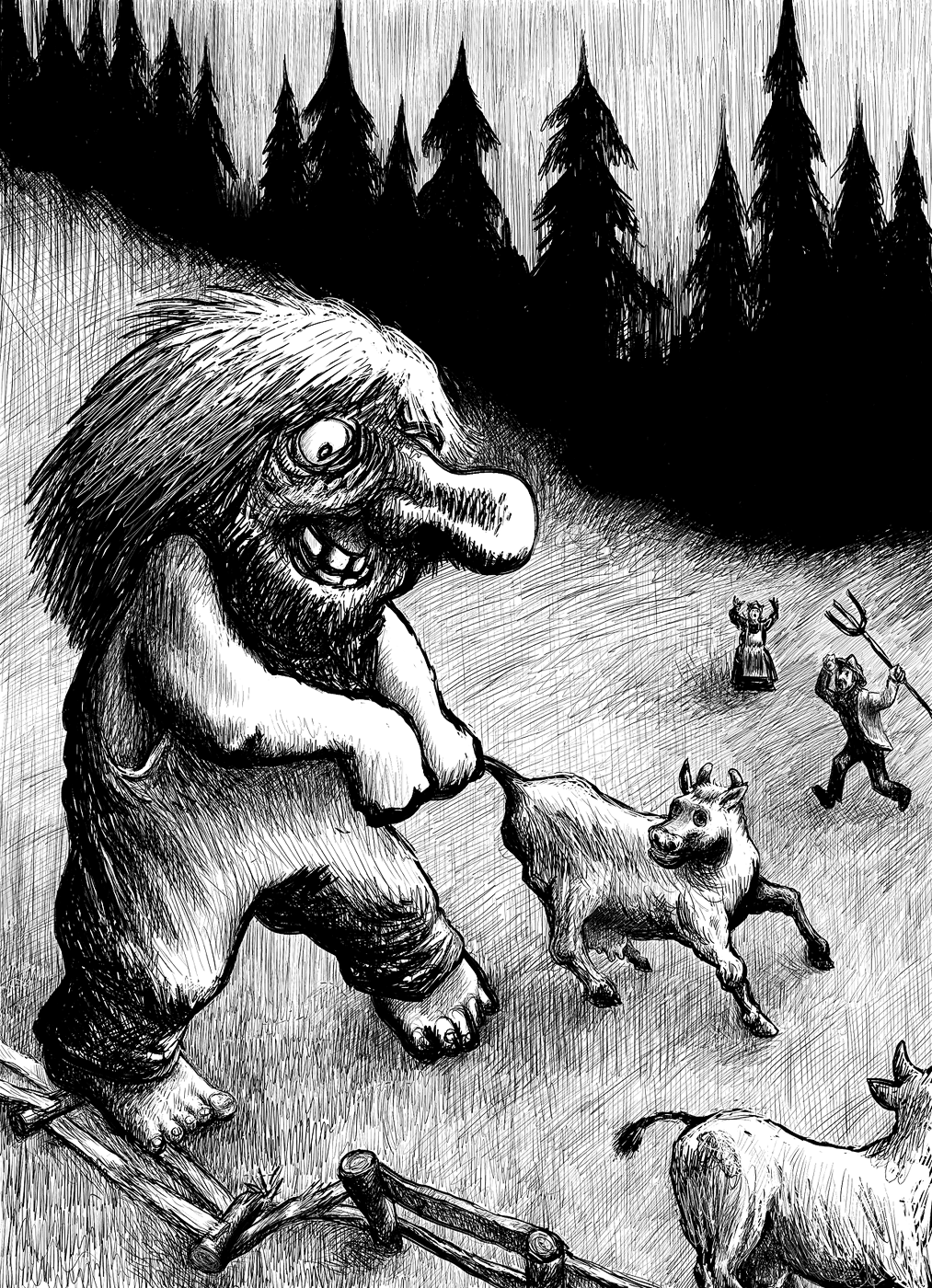
A troll is a fearsome member of a race of creatures from Norse mythology that have achieved international recognition and become stock characters in popular culture.

Troll as gay slang is amongst the lexicon of the cant Polari used in the gay subculture in Britain which has become more mainstream with transcontinental travel and online communication. There is still debate about how Polari originated but its origins can be traced back to at least the 19th century.

The term troll may have become equated with cruising because a troll is a "creature of Scandinavian folklore depicted as a devilish imp who lives in dark places and 'patrols' in an endless search." "The word trolla in Swedish means ‘to charm or bewitch’."

The linguist Paul Baker says, "As a Polari word, troll can mean ‘to walk effeminately’, or ‘to walk, seeking sex’." Trolling can be used almost interchangeably with cruising.

The word "troll" has remained unfamiliar even to many gay men in Britain, who have never heard, used, or needed to use the term. Regular customers in the same gay bar might have different takes on the usage – one simply referring to cruising, another referring to a negative version of a troll as a someone who "will have your skin crawling in seconds with his lascivious looks and raunchy repartee," another meaning older gays who prefer to troll for younger men.

Variations on troll exist. Paul Baker asserts that trolley-dolly may be "derived perhaps from a combination of lalies and troll. A trolley-dolly (contemporary gay slang) is a gay flight attendant".

"Trolling" is also a term used for generations among fishermen in boats, to describe the way they let a line with a hook and bait on the "fishing line" follow along behind the boat moving slowly, hoping that this slow baiting of the fish will result in a catch. In Gay sub-cultural slang usage would often be coded to seem as though the speaker was talking about "fishing behavior'" but the "gay slang" usage decodes the message to mean "cruising for sex" and luring the potential contacts [catch]. The homosexual "cruising" could be called "trolling" to mean moving along slowly and letting potential contacts ["catches"] have opportunity to "take the bait" i.e. connect for sex. It does also carry the implicit meaning of being a behavior done by older less desirable men seeking sex in public places, but younger people may use the term either to describe serious sexual hunting, or to make light of it, and by using the term "trolling" to put a humorous light on what is considered to be a somewhat socially questionable behavior.

== Etiquette ==
Depending on the culture the men are in, the setting, time of day (or evening), how comfortable they are about their sexuality and their intentions will all affect the trolling experience. Some men are still coming out or even a virgin to same-sex experiences; some societies punish gays with prison, public humiliation and even death. So having the appearance of just walking through the area or using a restroom comes in handy until those there for sexual fulfillment can let their guard down as it becomes obvious everyone is there with like-minded goals. For regular areas or “troll haunts” that are frequented by a recurring group of trolls there is a general rule that "as in most gay male settings, the young, the muscular, and the unfamiliar are more sought."

A troll's intention will also influence actions and outcomes ranging from casual sex in a more private area to exhibitionism like masturbating to group sex, fulfilling a sexual fantasy or even the voyeuristic thrill of watching someone else have public sex. Some are looking to: perform fellatio either directly or through a glory hole, receive it, or switch roles; perform or receive anal sex; participate in group sex or a BDSM experience even including gang bangs; or simply to watch others perform sex acts.

A regular public bathroom at a college, public library, shopping mall, train station or even a public park could be a higher risk trolling venue while more private venues like nightclubs, bars, offices and even churches add to the sexual excitement for some escalating the experience with more taboo environments. For some potentially getting caught is almost better than the sex itself.

== Legal concerns ==
Public sex is often illegal, but enforcement varies from lax and rarely enforced to the aggressive pursuit of entrapment, even at disproportionate financial expense to the police force. Victims of other crimes, such as mugging or assault/gay bashing, during cruising also see varying support from police in different regions, from supportive to dismissive and insulting. Cases of police brutality against gay men found cruising cause further distrust of law enforcement in the gay community, although it is used on the Internet often.

== See also ==
- Age disparity in sexual relationships
- Cottaging
- Dogging (sexual slang)
- Gay bathhouse
- Gay beat
- Cruising for sex
- Polari
