= Kaliarda =

Greek gay argot

Kaliardà (Greek: Καλιαρντά) is a cant developed by LGBT speakers of Modern Greek in Greece.

== Usage ==
Kaliardà came up first in the beginning of the 20th century in Athens and other urban centers of Greece in order to create a secret language for marginalized LGBT people. According to poet George La Nonce, the language was used as a code to recognize each other and to exclude others, for example in cruising spaces like parks or public toilets. The heights of the use of the language were from the 1940s until the end of the dictatorship in Greece in 1974. With the rise of more visibility and less repression of the LGBT community, Kaliardà has been used less and less.

Elias Petropoulos self-published the first dictionary of Kaliardà in 1971, Kaliardá: An Etymological Dictionary of Greek Homosexual Slang. Petropoulos was arrested and spent 8 months in prison because of the publication of this dictionary during the military dictatorship.

Trans filmmaker Paola Revenioti made a documentary film about the language in 2018.

== Description ==
Kaliardà has a dictionary with more than 3000 words. Many words were not invented, but adapted from other languages like Romani, Dortica (a Para-Romani secret language of Greek Roma people) and Turkish, but also Italian, French and English. Words in Kaliardà can be alloys of two or three different languages. The language also plays with foreign affixoids added to Modern Greek words. Onomatopoeias are common in Kaliardà.

According to Petropoulos, the name Kaliardà derives from French gaillard ("strong", "sprightly", "lively"). Gordon M. Messing claims it comes from a Romani word for gypsy.

== Examples ==
- Αβέλω - I want, give, desire
- Άβελε αποκατέ - Come here
- Αβέλω αχαλιά - I am on a diet
- Αβέλω κοντροσόλ - I kiss
- Αβέλω νάψες - I talk
- Αβέλω ροντοσόλ - I kiss
- Αβέλω τούφες - I lie down, I sleep
- Αβέλω μπιεσμάν - to lay hands on someone
- Αβέλει το μουτζό της - She is menstruating
- Αποκατέ - from there
- Ατζινάβωτος - to become senile
- Βακουλή - church
- Βουέλω τζα - to go away, to send away
- Βουτρά - boobs
- γαργαρότεκνο - sailor
- Γκουνιότα - lesbian
- Γκούρμπαντος - charming man
- Γουγούμης - dog
- Δικέλω - I see
- Επιτάφος - gay accompanied by well-dressed teens
- Ηράκλω - womanizer
- Θεά - delicious food
- Θεόλατσος - handsome
- Θεοκάλιαντος - ugly
- Ισάντες - you
- Ιμάντες - we (incongruous pronoun, singular: emantes)
- Καγκελοκερικεντέ - lighter
- Κάδροω - ugly
- Καλιαρντός - ugly, bad
- Καπί - spoon
- Καραμουτζού - whore
- Καλιάρντω - very ugly
- Κατσικές - left-wing (opposite: sheep = right-wing)
- Κέντα - fire
- Κουελοσφαλάω - to lie down, to sleep
- Κουλό - chic
- Κοντροσολάρω - to kiss
- Κουραβάλω - to actively associate
- Κουραβέλτα - intercourse
- Λάγκα - water
- Λατσαβέλω - to welcome
- Λατσός - nice, good
- Λατσολίθαρο - diamond
- Λούγκρα - very bad
- Λούμπα - homosexual
- Λυσσαγμάν - dog
- Μαντάμ γκου - lesbian
- Μη μπενά - Don't talk
- Μολ - water, wet
- Μουσαντό - lie
- Μούτζα - woman
- Μουτζό - vulva
- Μπαρό - disease
- Μπάρα - big penis
- Μπαροτάτη - very fat
- Μπενάβω - to speak
- Μπενάβω ανθυγιεινά - badmouthing
- Μπερντές - money (synonym: ντουλά)
- Μπουάβω - speak
- Με-σικ - with courtesy, elegantly (pronounced as one word)*
- Νάκα - no, not
- Νισετέ - garment
- Νταλκαρέτεκνο - permanent lover
- Ντέζι - desire
- Ντίκος - Here! Look!
- Ντουλά - money
- Ντουπ - sword, beating
- Πισέλω - lying down, lying asleep
- Πούλη - anus
- Πομπίνο-φραπέ - cunnilingus (from French "pon-pon" and "frapper")
- Προβατές - right-wing
- Ροσολιμαντέ - lick (from rossolo), limp
- Σαρμέλλα - penis
- Σερμέλα - penis (synonyms: φακιροπίπιζα, τουτού)
- Σιβιτζιλού - lesbian
- Σιβίτζω - lesbian
- Σιδεροπυρούω - lighter
- Σολντά - soldier
- Σουκρο - sweet sugar
- Σουσέλ - pedophilia
- Τανάκα - without, not!
- Τζασλός - crazy, mad, madman
- Τζάσε - Go away!
- Τζάζω - go away, leave, fly
- Τζάω - to understand
- Τζιβιτζιλού - lesbian
- Τζινάβω - go
- Τζους - without
- Τζους - wash
- Τζούσ-λέσι - car
- Τζους καλιαρντό γκουγκού - Go away, evil ghost!
- Τουρκόζουμο - coffee
- Τιντέλης - food
- Τρόκι - dog
- Τσόλι - male prostitute
- Υψομετρού - country gay. (synonyms: βλαχοντάνα, γιδοτεκνοσυντήρητη)
- Φακιροπίπιζα - penis
- Φίφα - small penis
- Φλοκάρω - to ejaculate
- Φλόκια ρομανόφ - Russian salad
- Χαλέματα - eat
- Χαλώ - fire
- Χορχόρα - fire
- Χορχοροτεκνό - fireman
- Ψαμοσκελού - cock (from ψαμός = fishing + strands)

== See also ==
- Polari
- Lubunca
- LGBT rights in Greece
- LGBT slang
- Swardspeak
- Terminology of homosexuality
