= Lesbian language =

Lesbian language can refer to:

- Aeolic Greek, a dialect of Greek used on the island of Lesbos
- a subset of LGBTQ linguistics
