= Paola Revenioti =

Greek LGBTQ activist and visual artist (1958–2026)

Paola Revenioti (Greek: Πάολα Ρεβενιώτη; 29 June 1958 – 9 July 2026) was a Greek LGBTQ activist, visual artist, publisher and filmmaker. A pioneering figure in the Greek LGBTQ movement, she was the first openly transgender woman to run for political office in Greece. Over five decades, she worked as a sex worker, published the ground-breaking magazine Kraximo, organised some of the first Pride events in Athens, and created a body of documentary films focusing on Greece's queer community.

== Early life ==
Revenioti was born on 29 June 1958 in Piraeus, the port city of Athens, and grew up in the nearby suburb of Keratsini. Her father was a factory worker and her mother a hairdresser. Seeking to escape a family environment that regarded her homosexuality as shameful, she enrolled in the Navy School for Boys at the age of 13.

During her time at the school, she engaged in first political activities by writing slogans on wall of her school after the fall of the Greek junta. She also had her first sexual experiences at school, which she later recalled as "tender and loving". On one occasion, while out cruising in central Athens, she met an army reservist who became violent. When Revenioti called for help, the police intervened but arrested her instead. She was subsequently held for eight days and discharged from school at the age of 15 for "acts unbecoming military office". As she was leaving the school, fellow cadets threw her into the sea.

Following her expulsion, Revenioti moved to Athens and began living as a woman, taking the name Paola. She found work as a wallpaper fitter's assistant and a door-to-door saleswoman, but faced significant transphobia, including harassment and threats from landlords. To survive and express her identity, she turned to sex work on Syngrou Avenue in Athens in 1976, describing it as "the only way to feel like yourself, and also to have some control".

== Activism ==
In the late 1970s and early 1980s, state repression against homosexuals was severe, and police raids were frequent. Revenioti was arrested numerous times and began filing official complaints against police abuse. She became involved with the Greek Movement for Homosexual Liberation (AKOE). She lived in the anarchist and dissident neighbourhood of Exarcheia.

In 1981, Revenioti began self-publishing Kraximo (Κράξιμο), a magazine she described as a publication of "revolutionary homosexual expression". The title is a Kaliarda term for publicly mocking and outing a gay person. The magazine, which ran from 1981 to 1993 with 14 issues, featured semi-nude photographs of young men, poetry, and articles on gay and trans rights, workers' rights, and radical politics. It was notable for its anarchist and trans-inclusive perspective. Revenioti funded the magazine through her sex work, often printing the first issues on pink paper she acquired from clients. The magazine also hosted articles by intellectuals like philosopher Félix Guattari and poet Dinos Christianopoulos. Several articles in the magazine got her into legal problems; she had to pay a fine for publishing a poem by Jean Cocteau. VICE Greece called it one of the most radical publications of its time.

In 1990, Revenioti became the first Greek trans woman to run for political office, standing as a candidate for the Alternative Ecologists party. Her name was also discussed as a potential candidate for the Ecologist Greens in 1996, but the nomination did not proceed due to bad reactions within the party.

In 1992, Revenioti was a principal organiser of the first Athens Pride events on Strefi Hill. She became secretary-general of the Solidarity Association of Greek Transsexuals and Transvestites (SATTE) in 2003.

In her later years, Revenioti focused on documentary filmmaking, working with a collective called "Paola Team Documentaries". In 2015, she released Kaliarda, a documentary about the Kaliarda slang used by the Greek gay subculture from the 1940s until the fall of the junta. In 2021, she co-directed Oleanders about the lives of three trans women sex workers in Athens.

In the 2010s, she joined the left-wing MeRA25 party, led by Yanis Varoufakis. She stood as a candidate in the 2019 and 2023 Greek parliamentary elections, as well as in the 2024 European Parliament election.

Revenioti also had a solo art exhibition in Athens in 2013, curated by Andreas Angelidakis, and later exhibited in London. Her photography focused on the intimate lives of her clients, friends and lovers, blending erotic photography with political themes.

== Personal life and death ==
Revenioti had an adopted son. She spoke of him with pride, stating that he had chosen her as a mother knowing everything about her, and that she was "jumping out of joy" at the prospect of becoming a grandmother.

Revenioti died at Sismanogleio General Hospital in Athens, on 9 July 2026, after a months-long battle with cancer. She was 68. Her death was announced by her friend, journalist Danai Maragoudaki, who paid tribute to her as a figure who helped others "breathe more freely".
