= Rotvælsk =

Secret language spoken in Denmark

- Rotvælsk
- Region: Denmark
- Extinct: ca. 1900
- Language family: unclassified

Language codes
- ISO 639-3: None (mis)
- Glottolog: None

Rotvælsk was a secret language (also known as a cant or cryptolect) that was spoken in Denmark from early modern times until the turn of the 20th century. Rotvælsk was also known under several other names. It is now extinct. Rotvælsk was used by a social group known as Natmændsfolk who did simple craftsmanship, demeaning and unclean work or panhandled to survive. Both the social group and the language changed through the centuries, but remained associated with crime, loose morals, poverty and low social status in the eyes of the surrounding population. The social group and their language have often been confused with Romani people and the Romani language, though they do not seem to have had a different ethnic origin than most Danes at that time.

The language consisted of borrowed and/or distorted words that took the place of Danish words, while keeping the syntax of the speakers' Danish dialect.

The language was probably used for secret communication in the presence of outsiders and to strengthen ingroup solidarity.

== See also ==
Rotvælsk should not be confused with:

- German Rotwelsch
- Norwegian Rodi/Rotvælsk
