= Swardspeak =

Queer argot in the Philippines

- Bekinese
- Native to: Philippines
- Native speakers: Filipino gay community
- Language family: Creole: Taglish and Englog; Swardspeak
- Writing system: Latin

Language codes
- ISO 639-2: cpe
- ISO 639-3: –

Swardspeak (also known as salitang bakla (lit. 'gay speak') or "gay lingo") or Bekinese, is an argot or cant slang derived from Taglish (Tagalog-English code-switching) and used by a number of LGBT people in the Philippines.

== Description ==
Swardspeak uses elements from Tagalog, English, Spanish, and some from Japanese, as well as celebrities' names and trademark brands, giving them new meanings in different contexts. It is largely localized within gay communities, making use of words derived from the local languages, including Cebuano, Hiligaynon, Kapampangan, Pangasinan, Waray and Bicolano.

== Usage ==
A defining trait of swardspeak slang is that it more often than not immediately identifies the speaker as homosexual, making it easy for people of that orientation to recognize each other. This creates an exclusive group among its speakers and helps them resist cultural assimilation. More recently, even non-members of the gay community have been known to use this way of speaking, e.g. heterosexual members of industries with a significant amount of gay workers such as the fashion and film industries.

Swardspeak as a language is constantly changing, with old phrases becoming obsolete and new phrases frequently entering everyday usage, reflecting changes in their culture and also maintaining exclusivity. The dynamic nature of the language refuses to cement itself in a single culture and allows for more freedom of expression among its speakers. Words and phrases can be created to react to popular trends and create alternatives to a strictly defined lifestyle. By these characteristics, swardspeak creates a dissident group without any ties to geographical, linguistic, or cultural restrictions, allowing its speakers to shape the language as they see fit, with relation to current times. In this way, the language is not only "mobile" and part of a larger community, but also open to more specific or local meanings and interpretations.

== Origin ==
The word "swardspeak", according to José Javier Reyes, was coined by columnist and film critic Nestor Torre in the 1970s. Reyes himself wrote a book on the subject entitled Swardspeak: A Preliminary Study. "Sward" is an outdated slang for 'gay male' in the Philippines. The origin of the individual words and phrases, however, has existed longer and come from a variety of sources.

== Conventions ==
Swardspeak is a form of slang (and therefore highly dynamic, as opposed to colloquialisms) that is built upon preexisting languages. It deliberately transforms or creates words that resemble words from other languages, particularly English, Japanese, Chinese, Spanish, Portuguese, French, and German. It is colorful, witty, and humorous, with vocabularies derived from popular culture and regional variations. It is unintelligible to people not familiar with the Filipino gay culture or who do not know the rules of usage. There is no standardized set of rules, but some of the more common conventions are shown below:

- Replacing the first letter/syllable of words with the letter "J"/"Sh" or the syllables "Jo-"/"Sho-" or "Ju-"/"Shu-".

Swardspeak	Original word	Language of origin
Jowa (variant diminutive: Jowabelle/Jowabels)	Asawa (spouse, usually female)	Tagalog, Cebuano, Hiligaynon
Jomba	Tabâ (fat)	Tagalog
Gora (variant diminutive: Gorabelle/Gorabels)	to go (to a place)	English
Shupatembang, Shupated, Jupiter	Kapatíd (sibling)	Tagalog
Shunga	Tangá (idiot)	Tagalog, Cebuano, Hiligaynon
Julalay	Alalay (assistant)	Tagalog

- Replacing the first letter/syllable of words with "Ky-" or "Ny-".

Swardspeak	Original word	Language of origin
Kyota	Batà (child)	Tagalog
Nyorts	Shorts	English
Nyormville	FarmVille	English
Kyoho	Mabahò (stinking)	Tagalog

- Replacing the end syllable of words with "-ash", "-is", "-iz", "-ish", "-itch", "-ech", "-ush", or "-oosh" as a diminutive or augmentative suffix.

Swardspeak	Original word	Language of origin
Jotis (a very small amount)	Jutay (a small amount)	Cebuano, Hiligaynon
Jubis (very fat)	obese	English
Taroosh (very bitchy)	Taray (bitchy)	Tagalog
Baboosh (goodbye)	Babay/Bye-bye	Philippine English
Itech (this)	Itó (this)	Tagalog
Sinetch (who)	Sinó (who)	Tagalog
Anech (what, usually exclamatory)	Anó (what)	Tagalog

- Replacing "a", "o", or "u" sounds with "or", "er", or "ur", especially directly before or after the consonant "l".

Swardspeak	Original word	Language of origin
Haller/Heller	Hello	English
Kalurkey	Kaloka (insanely [entertaining], maddening, crazy)	Tagalog (from Spanish loca)
Gander	Gandá (beautiful)	Tagalog
Walley	Walâ (nothing, none), often used to mean a lack of the desired response (e.g. to an unfunny joke)	Tagalog

- Inverting the letter order of a word, similar to Tagalog syllable switching slang. It is predominantly used in Cebuano swardspeak.

Swardspeak	Original word	Language of origin
Ilij (no, not)	Dili (no, not)	Cebuano
Bayu (lover, boyfriend)	Uyab (lover)	Cebuano
Nial (bad, unpleasant)	Lain (bad, unpleasant)	Cebuano, Hiligaynon

- Word play, puns, malapropisms, code-switching, onomatopoeic words that resemble preexisting words, and deliberately incorrect Anglicization of words.

Swardspeak	Original word(s)	Language of origin
Crayola (to cry, to be sad)	Cry	English
Antibiotic (obnoxious, unpleasant)	Antipátika (obnoxious, unpleasant)	Tagalog (from Spanish antipática)
Liberty (free)	Libre (free)	Tagalog (from Spanish libre)
Career/Karír ('to take seriously', in the sense of "they turned it into their career", used as a verb, e.g. karirin, "to career", kinareer)	Career	English
Fillet O'Fish (to be attracted to someone)	Feel (to sympathize)	English
Kapé / Capuccino / Coffeemate (to be realistic)	'Wake up and smell the coffee.' (a humorous corruption of 'Wake up and smell the roses')	Philippine English
Thundercats (old, or the elderly, particularly old gay men)	Matandâ (old)	Tagalog
Chiminey Cricket (housemaid)	Deliberate corruption of Jiminy Cricket, Chimáy (Tagalog slang for housemaid)	Tagalog
Warla (war, fight, quarrel)	War	English
Nota (penis)	Description as musical note	Tagalog
Pocahontas (prostitute)	Pokpok (slang for 'prostitute')	Tagalog
Pagoda Cold Wave Lotion (tired, exhausted)	A locally available brand of cold wave lotion for setting permanent waves, and pagód (tired, exhausted)	Tagalog
Mudra (mother, also used to refer to female friends with children)	Madre (mother)	Spanish, Portuguese
Pudra (father, also used to refer to male friends with children)	Padre (father)	Spanish, Portuguese
Hammer (prostitute)	Pokpok (slang for 'prostitute), pukpók (onomatopoeic Tagalog word 'to pound', 'to hammer')	Tagalog, English
Biyuti/Beyooti (beautiful, pretty)	Beauty, word play of Cebuano bayot ('gay')	English, Cebuano
Silahis (bisexual male, often flamboyant)	Silahis ([sun]beam, ray)	Tagalog
Boyband (fat kid)	A pun on Tagalog baboy ('pig')	Tagalog, English
G.I. Joe (A foreign lover, particularly American)	Acronym for 'Gentleman Idiot', with the implication being that the foreigner does not know their partner is a cross-dressing male	English
Opposition Party (a social occasion with a lot of expected problems)	Pun on political opposition	English
Egyptian Airlines (jeepney)	jeepney, jeep (or dyip in Tagalog)	English
Geisha (he is gay)	gay siyá	English, Tagalog

- References to popular culture, usually celebrities or TV shows. They can be selected to replace a word in reference to the things they were famous for, simply because parts of the words rhyme, or both.

Swardspeak	Original word or concept	Derived from
Julie Andrew (to be caught cheating)	Hulì (Tagalog, 'to be caught')	'Julie' rhymes with 'hulì', and references British actress Julie Andrews
Gelli de Belén (jealous)	Jealous	Gelli de Belen
Winnie Cordero (to win, have won)	Win	Winnie Cordero
Luz Valdez (to lose, have lost)	Lose	Luz Valdez
Toy Story (toy, or any other kind of plaything)	toy	Toy Story
Julanis Morissette (raining)	ulán (Tagalog, 'rain')	Alanis Morissette
Jinit Jackson (hot weather)	init (Tagalog, 'hot')	Janet Jackson
Tommy Lee Jones / Tom Jones (hungry)	Tom-guts (Tagalog syllable switching slang for gutóm, 'hungry')	Tommy Lee Jones, Tom Jones
Stress Drilon (stress)	stress	Ces Drilon
Haggardo Versoza (haggard)	haggard (exhausted, tired)	Gardo Versoza
X-Men (formerly appearing to be heterosexual, coming out, especially turning from hypermasculine to effeminate)	'Ex-man'	X-Men
Fayatollah Kumenis (thin)	Payát (Tagalog, 'thin')	Ayatollah Khomeini
Barbra Streisand (to be rejected bluntly, blocked)	Bará (Tagalog, 'to block', including verbally)	Barbra Streisand
Muriah Carrey (cheap)	Mura (Tagalog, 'cheap')	Mariah Carey
Lupita Kashiwahara (cruel)	Lupít (Tagalog, 'cruel')	Lupita Aquino-Kashiwahara, a Filipina film and television director, and sister of assassinated Senator Benigno Aquino Jr.)
Carmi Martin (karma)	Karma	Carmi Martin
Rita Gómez (irritating, annoying)	Nakaka-iritá (Tagalog and Spanish, 'irritating')	Rita Gómez
Mahalia Jackson (expensive)	Mahál (Tagalog 'expensive', 'precious', 'dear')	Mahalia Jackson
Anaconda (traitor, to betray)	Ahas (Tagalog slang, 'to betray', literally 'snake')	Anaconda (film)
Badinger Z (homosexual)	Badíng (Tagalog derogatory slang, 'homosexual')	Mazinger Z (anime)
Taxina Hong Kingston (to wait for a taxicab)	Taxi	Maxine Hong Kingston
Noël Coward (No)	No	Noël Coward
Oprah Winfrey (promise)	Promise	Oprah Winfrey
Sharon Cuneta (yes, sure)	Sure	Sharon Cuneta
Mag-Sharon (To Sharon)	Take home leftovers from parties. Derived from the lines "Balutin mo ako sa liwanag ng iyong pagmamahal" ("Wrap me in the light of your love") from Cuneta's single, Bituing Walang Ningning.	Sharon Cuneta
Jesus Christ Superstar	Resurrection	Jesus Christ Superstar
Optimus Prime (a fashion makeover, to change into more fashionable clothing)	Transformation	Optimus Prime
Churchill (high society)	Sosyál	Winston Churchill

- Borrowed words from other languages, particularly long disused Spanish words in the Philippines (which has feminine forms of words preferred in swardspeak that is absent in most Filipino languages), English, and Japanese.

Swardspeak	Definition	Origin
Dramá (also the adjective 'dramatic')	Melodrama, exaggeration, drama [queen]	English
Carry/Keri	To carry [oneself well], manageable	English
Siete Pecados	Nosy, gossipmonger	Spanish, 'seven sins'; also two different rock formations in the Philippines
Puñeta (also spelt punyeta)	General profanity, roughly equivalent to 'fuck'	Spanish slang, with varying degrees of perceived obscenity. Literally, 'in a fist'.
Chiquito	Small	Spanish, 'small'
Coño (also spelt konyo)	High society, especially [affluent] socialites who speak Taglish exclusively	Spanish slang, 'vagina'
Otoko	Manly man	Japanese, 男 (otoko)
Berru	Beer	Japanese, ビール (bīru)
Watashi	Me, I	Japanese, 私 (watashi)

== Examples ==
- Translation of the traditional Filipino nursery rhyme Ako ay May Lobo (I have a balloon) into swardspeak.

Original version
Ako ay may lobo

Lumipád sa langit
Di ko na nakità
Pumutók na palá
Sayang lang ang pera,
Pinambilí ng lobo
Sa pagkain sana,
Nabusóg pa ako.

Translation into swardspeak
Aketch ai may lobing

Flylalou sa heaven
Witchels ko na nasightness
Jumutók lang pala
Sayang lang ang anda
Pinang buysung ng lobing
Kung lafangertz sana
Nabusóg pa aketch

Approximate English translation
I had a balloon

It flew up to the sky
I couldn't see it anymore
[Didn't know] it had popped
Money was just a waste
Buying the balloon
Had I bought food instead
At least I would have been full

- Translation of the traditional Filipino nursery rhyme Bahay Kubò (Nipa hut) into swardspeak.

Original version
Bahay kubò, kahit muntî

Ang halaman doón,
Ay sari-sarì
Singkamás, at talóng,
Sigarilyas at manî
Sitaw, bataw, patani
Kundól, patola, upo’t kalabasa
At saka meron pa
Labanós, mustasa
Sibuyas, kamatis, bawang at luya
Sa paligid-ligid
Ay puno ng lingá

Translation into swardspeak
Valer kuberch, kahit jutey

Ang julamantrax denchi,
Ay anek-anek.
Nyongkamas at nutring,
Nyogarilyas at kipay.
Nyipay, nyotaw, jutani.
Kundol, fyotola, kyupot jolabastrax
At mega join-join pa
Jobanos, nyustasa,
Nyubuyak, nyomatis, nyowang at luyax
And around the keme
Ay fulnes ng linga.

Approximate English translation
Nipa hut, though it be small

The plants it houses
Are sundry and all
Jicama and eggplant,
Winged bean and peanut
String bean, hyacinth bean, lima bean.
Wax gourd, luffa,
long gourd and squash,
And then there is also white radish, mustard greens,
Onion, tomato,
Garlic, and ginger
And all around
Are sesame seeds.

== See also ==
- Tagalog profanity
- Bahasa Binan, a similar dialect in Indonesia
- Gayle language, an Afrikaans-based gay argot
- IsiNgqumo, a South African gay argot based on the Bantu languages
- Lavender linguistics
- LGBT culture in the Philippines
- LGBT slang
- Manila sound, a musical genre from the Philippines often characterized by the use of swardspeak
- Polari, cant slang used in Britain

== Bibliography ==
- DV Hart, H Hart. Visayan Swardspeak: The language of a gay community in the Philippines - Crossroads, 1990
- Manalansan, Martin F. IV. “’Performing’ the Filipino Gay Experiences in America: Linguistic Strategies in a Transnational Context.” Beyond the Lavender Lexicon: Authenticity, Imagination and Appropriation in Lesbian and Gay Language. Ed. William L Leap. New York: Gordon and Breach, 1997. 249–266
- Manalansan, Martin F. IV. “Global Divas: Filipino Gay Men in the Diaspora”, Duke University Press Books, November 19, 2003. ISBN 978-0-8223-3217-6
