= Agbirigba =

Argot

- Created by: a persecuted section of the Ogbakiri community
- Users: ≈ 30 (2010)
- Purpose: Cant
- Sources: a modification of the Ogbakiri dialect of Ikwere

Language codes
- ISO 639-3: None (mis)
- Glottolog: agbi1234

Agbirigba is a cant (or argot) based on the Ogbakiri dialect of the Nigerian language Ikwerre of Port Harcourt. There are about thirty speakers, from a persecuted section of the community.

Agbirigba is unintelligible to other speakers of Ikwerre, but the rule for its derivation is simple: the consonant t is added before every CV syllable (or, more accurately, every CV mora). Some speakers add an epenthetic vowel to break up the resulting consonant cluster.

== Derivation ==
The addition of the t results in consonant clusters that do not occur in Ikwerre or other local languages. Some speakers pronounce Agbirigba with the resulting clusters. For speakers to break them up with vowels, the vowels are all high (one of the four vowels /i ɪ u ʊ/), and match the subsequent vowel in ATR, backness, nasality and tone.

An NCV sequence becomes NtCV. For example, m̀fù 'horn' becomes ǹtfù or ǹtùfù.

There are some complications to this: if the following vowel is /a/, with no ATR quality for the epenthetic vowel to match, then the epenthetic vowel will be /i/ or /u/ depending on, apparently, whether the following consonant is coronal or velar, and if the tone of the following syllable (whether CV or CVV) is complex (rising or falling), then the first element of that tone will move to the epenthetic vowel.

Examples

- ńkétʃí vò ré ídʒí "Nkechi bought a yam"

becomes:

- ńtkéttʃí tvò tré ítdʒí

or

- ńtíkétítʃí tùvò tíré ítídʒí

Here all the vowels are ATR, so the epenthetic vowels are /i/ or /u/ depending on whether the following vowel is front (/e/ or /i/) or back (/o/ or /u/). There is no t before the word-initial syllabic nasal in Nkechi or word-initial vowel in iji, as neither is a CV syllable.

- ŋ́gɔ́zɪ́ wṹ lêm "Ngozi died"

becomes:

- ńtgɔ́tzɪ́ twṹ tlêm

or

- ńtʊ́gɔ́tɪ́zɪ́ tṹwṹ tílèm

Here we have some RTR and nasal vowels. With the high–low tone on lêm, the high element shifts to the epenthetic vowel for tílèm.
