= William Leap =

American linguist

William (Bill) Leap
- Known for: Lavender Languages and Linguistics
- Title: Professor Emeritus
- Awards: Ruth Benedict Prize (monograph 1996; edited volume 2004, 2009) Association for Queer Anthropology Distinguished Achievement Award (2023)

Academic background
- Education: Florida State University Southern Methodist University

William Leap is an emeritus professor of anthropology at American University (Washington, DC) and an affiliate professor in the Women's, Gender and Sexuality Studies Program at Florida Atlantic University (Boca Raton, FL). He works in the overlapping fields of language and sexuality studies and queer linguistics, and queer historical linguistics.

William Leap earned his bachelor's degree from Florida State University in 1967 and his Ph.D. from Southern Methodist University in 1970. His dissertation advisor was George Trager.

== Contributions ==
Leap has been openly gay since he began teaching at American University in Washington, D.C., in 1970. Leap is a leading academic in Lavender linguistics and has been a recipient of the American Anthropological Association Ruth Benedict Award for publishing in Gay and Lesbian anthropology in 1996, 2003, and 2009. He founded the annual Lavender Languages & Linguistics conference in 1993 to coincide with the March on Washington for Lesbian, Gay and Bi Equal Rights and Liberation. The conference continues to meet annually, and provides a focal point for international discussion of lgbtq-related language issues worldwide. The Lavender Language Institute, a summer program that Leap founded at Florida Atlantic University in 2017, offers training in queer linguistics to undergraduates, grad students, and others interested in language and sexuality studies.

In 2012, Leap launched The Journal of Language and Sexuality with Heiko Motschenbacher. He has been a member of the American Anthropological Association's AIDS task force and co-chaired the AAA's Commission on Gay, Lesbian Bisexual, Trans and Queer Issues in Anthropology (1993–1998). He has done research among Native Americans of the Southwest U.S., South Africans, and Gay men in Washington, DC. He was one of the first researchers to study American Indian varieties of English (including American Indian Pidgin English) in the same way that others had studied Black English, and he has been prominent in Indian language revitalization projects. In November 2023, Leap was recognized by the Association for Queer Anthropology with its Distinguished Achievement Award.

== Lavender Languages and Linguistics Conference ==
Lavender Languages and Linguistics conference is an international conference for LGBT linguistics and other related queer language research and discourse studies. The conference was founded in 1993 by Leap to coincide with the March on Washington for Lesbian, Gay and Bi Equal Rights and Liberation. At the time, research on these topics was considered marginal within linguistics, and the conference was a key place for researchers to come together to discuss issues in the field. By the 20th conference, there were over 80 presentations and 150 attendees. The conference was host yearly at American University in Washington, DC until 2017 when the conference began to move each year. It provides a place for emerging queer linguistics scholarship, and it is the conference is the longest continually running LGBT studies conference in the US.

A meta-synthesis of conference abstracts by Paul Baker and published in Milani's chapter in The Oxford Handbook of Language and Society found early work presented at the conference focused on the existence of "gay language" such as Polari and "lesbian language". In line with the trajectory of the field, more recent work has focused on how various linguistic features index different identities.

The Journal of Language and Sexuality (though not officially linked to LavLang) is closely affiliated with the conference. It was established venue to publish queer linguistics research.

Number	Year	Date	Host University	City	Country	Website	Notes
1st	1993	April	American University	Washington, D.C.	United States		
2nd	1994		American University	Washington, D.C.	United States		
3rd	1995		American University	Washington, D.C.	United States		
4th	1996	September	American University	Washington, D.C.	United States		Keynote speakers: Ellen Lewin, Charles Nero, Deborah Tannen, Riki Ann Wilchins
5th	1997		American University	Washington, D.C.	United States		
6th	1998		American University	Washington, D.C.	United States		
7th	1999		American University	Washington, D.C.	United States		
8th	2000		American University	Washington, D.C.	United States		
9th	2002	February	American University	Washington, D.C.	United States		
11th	2003		American University	Washington, D.C.	United States		
12th	2004		American University	Washington, D.C.	United States		
13th	2005		American University	Washington, D.C.	United States		
14th	2006		American University	Washington, D.C.	United States		
15th	2008		American University	Washington, D.C.	United States		
16th	2009	February	American University	Washington, D.C.	United States		Plenaries: Aren Aizura and Mary Weismantel
17th	2010	April	American University	Washington, D.C.	United States		Plenaries/Special Presentations: Gibran Guido, Ellen Lewin, Andrew Tucker
18th	2011	February	American University	Washington, D.C.	United States		Plenaries: Scott Kiesling, Carlos Decena, Sharif Mowlabocus
19th	2012	February	American University	Washington, D.C.	United States		Special Events: Reporting and Writing Queer Temporalities (Panel discussion); Voices from a Chorus(featuring Paula Bresnan Gibson); 1 Girl, 5 Gays and LGBTQ Discourses in School Settings (featuring Philip Tetro); A Reading from “The Bar Notebook” (featuring Bonnie Morris)
20th	2013	February	American University	Washington, D.C.	United States		Special Events: Master Class with Tom Boellstorff; 20th Annual Conference Reception with AU Pride
21st	2014	February	American University	Washington, D.C.	United States		Special Events: Critical Discourse Analysis Workshop with David Peterson; Premier of Reinterpreting Bukovac (A Documentary Film); “American Orientation: Interpellation of the Gay Male Subject in Literary Narratives in Taiwan” with Ta-Wei Chi
22nd	2015	February	American University	Washington, D.C.	United States		Plenary: Rusty Barrett
23nd	2016	February	American University	Washington, D.C.	United States		
24th	2017	April	University of Nottingham	Nottingham	United Kingdom	[1]	Keynote speakers: Dr Helen Sauntson, York St John University (UK) and Professor Paul Baker, Lancaster University (UK).
25th	2018	April	Rhode Island College	Providence, Rhode Island	United States	[2]	Keynote speakers: Mie Hiramoto (National University of Singapore) Margot Weiss (Wesleyan University) and Lal Zimman (University of California, Santa Barbara).
26th	2019	May	University of Gothenburg	Gothenburg	Sweden	[3]	Keynote Speakers: Erika Alm, University of Gothenburg, Sweden Mons Bissenbakker, University of Copenhagen, Denmark, Rodrigo Borba, Federal University of Rio de Janeiro, Brazil, Holly Cashman, University of New Hampshire, USA, Thabo Msibi, University of KwaZulu-Natal, South Africa
27th	2021	May	California Institute of Integral Studies	San Francisco	United States	[4]	Keynote speakers: Jack Halberstam, Columbia University and Elizabeth Freeman, University of California at Davis Originally planned to be hosted in 2020 in San Francisco at California Institute of Integral Studies, the conference was postpoponed due to the COVID-19 pandemic and eventually moved to an online format in 2021.
28th	2022	May	University of Catania	Catania	Italy	[5]	Keynote speakers: J Calder, Adriana Di Stefano, Busi Makoni, Pietro Maturi, Tommaso M. Milani, Eva Nossem

== Lavender Languages Summer Institute ==
In 2017 the Lavender Languages Conference expanded to a Summer Institute, a summer program that Leap founded Florida Atlantic University. The institute offers 10 days of class discussion, research opportunities and informal conversations exploring topics of current interest in language and sexuality studies, queer linguistics, and various lavender language themes. The program focuses on training undergraduates, grad students, and others interested in language and sexuality studies.

Number	Year	Date	Host University	City	State	Notes
1st	2018	June	Florida Atlantic University	Boca Raton	Florida	
2nd	2019	June	Florida Atlantic University	Boca Raton	Florida	
3rd	2021	June	Florida Atlantic University	Virtual		Originally planned to be hosted in 2020 in person at Florida Atlantic University the conference was postponed due to the COVID-19 pandemic and eventually moved to an online format in 2021.
4th	2022	June	Florida Atlantic University	Virtual		
6th	2024	June	California Institute of Integral Studies	Virtual		
7th	2025	June	California Institute of Integral Studies	Virtual		
8th	2026	June	California Institute of Integral Studies	Virtual		

== Selected publications ==
- 2020 Language Before Stonewall London: Palgrave.
- 2020 Language, sexuality, history. in The Oxford Handbook of Language and Sexuality. Kira Hall and Rusty Barrett. New York: Oxford University Press.
- 2016 Language, sexuality, heteroglossia and intersectionality. in The Routledge Handbook of Linguistic Anthropology. Nancy Bonvillain,. 177–190. New York: Routledge.
- 2015 Queer linguistics as critical discourse analysis. in The Handbook of Discourse Analysis. Deborah Tannen, Heidi E. Hamilton and Deborah Schiffrin. 661–680.
- 2012 Queer linguistics, sexuality and discourse analysis. in The Routledge Handbook of Discourse Analysis James Paul Gee and Michael Haniford eds. 558–571. New York: Routledge.
- 2011 Language, gay pornography and audience reception. Journal of Homosexuality 58(6–7);932-952).
- 2010 Homophobia as moral geography. Gender and Language 4(2):187-220.
- 2009 Introducing Sociolinguistics, (2nd ed.) (Raj Mesthre, Joan Swann, Anna Deumert, and William Leap). Edinburgh: University of Edinburgh Press. (First edition, 2000)
- 2009 (co-edited with Ellen Lewin) Out in Public: Lesbian and Gay Anthropology in a Globalizing World. Malden MA: Wiley-Blackwell.
- 2008 Queering gay men's English. in Gender and Language Research Methodologies. Kate Harrington, Lia Lotosseliti, Helen Sauntson and Jane Sunderland. 283–296. Basingstoke: Palgrave.
- 2007 (with Liz Morrish) Sex talk: Language, desire, identity and beyond. in Language, Sexualities, and Desires: Cross-Cultural Perspectives. Helen Sauntson and Sakis Kyratzsis. 17–40. London: Palgrave Press.
- 2007 Queering the disaster: A Presidential session. (with Ellen Lewin and Natasha Wilson). North American Dialogues, 10(2):11-14.
- 2005 "Finding the Centre: Claiming gay space in Cape Town, South Africa." in Performing Queer: Shaping Sexualities 1992–2004. Mikki van Zyl and Melissa Steyn, eds. pp. 235–266. Cape Town: Kwela Press.
- 2004 "Marriage," "Family" and Same-Sex Marriage: Are We Addressing the Right Questions? Anthropology Newsletter, 45(6): 6.
- 2004 (co-edited with Tom Boellstorff) Speaking in Queer Tongues: Globalization and Gay Language. Urbana: University of Illinois Press.
- 2003 Language and gendered modernity. in The Handbook of Language and Gender. Janet Holmes and Miriam Meyerhoff, eds. pp. 401–422. London: Blackwell
- 2002 (co-edited with Ellen Lewin) Out in Theory: The Emergence of Lesbian and Gay Anthropology. Urbana: University of Illinois Press.
- 1998 (editor) Public Sex/Gay Space New York City: Columbia University Press.
- 1996 (co-edited with Ellen Lewin) Out in the Field: Lesbian and Gay Reflections. Urbana: University of Illinois Press.
- 1996 Word's Out: Gay Men's English. Minneapolis: University of Minnesota Press. (Now in second printing). A sociolinguistic discussion of gay English, including coded terms.
- 1996 Representation, subjectivity and ethics in urban gay ethnography (with Alan Hersker). City and Society, 12: 142–147.
- 1995 Review essay: Liminal gender categories: Third Sex, Third Gender. [Gilbert Herdt, ed]. American Anthropologist, 87 (3): 589–590.
