= Anti-society =

Separate community

An anti-society is a society or organization that is created in opposition to the larger society it exists within. Sometimes these societies actively agitate for reform, but sometimes they simply exist as an alternative for those who are discarded or marginalized by society.

Reformist anti-societies are often better known, as they aim to alter the mainstream. Examples include temperance societies, abolitionist societies, and anti-war movements, among others.

Alternative anti-societies do not aim to alter the mainstream, and may actively avoid the spread of their norms or ideas. This avoidance may include the creation of anti-languages to impede understanding and establish a shared vernacular that meets the needs of their alternative social structure. Anti-languages differ from slang and jargon in that they are used solely among ostracised or rebellious social groups including prisoners, criminals, homosexuals, and teenagers.

== Reformist Anti-Societies ==
Social movements as they exist today largely did not appear prior to the eighteenth century. In the late eighteenth century and early nineteenth century, organizations calling for reform started to be established. These early reform societies were often associated with the Second Great Awakening and pushed evangelical political agendas such as missionary efforts or the reduction of activities like dueling and gambling. In the 1820s, the scope of these missions expanded beyond evangelical goals and the societies fractured into groups focused on more granular purposes, "everything from anti-swearing and anti-Masonry to anti-Indian removal and anti-slavery." Societies advocating for temperance, also sometimes referred to as anti-intemperance societies, grew out of this as well. Generally, as societies comprising movements advocating for reform, they opposed the state of American politics and culture that they lived in.

Criticism of social reform organizations sometimes took the shape of facetious organizations parodying them as over-active or excessively nosy. These, too, were anti-societies in that they opposed the effort to reform American culture, though they appeared more often as jokes than societies with actual meetings or members. "Anti-society" were jokes often accompanied by real social and physical violence, though this violence was only rarely carried out in a centralized manner.

== Alternative Anti-Societies ==
By their nature, alternative anti-societies can be difficult to identify, and harder to study, as they often avoid transmitting their culture to non-members. However, they have been observed among marginalized groups throughout history whose activities may be criminalized or disapproved of by the larger society.
