= Gender pronoun transposition =

LGBTQ linguistic phenomenon of switching pronouns

Gender pronoun transposition or pronoun switching is the substitution of a gendered personal pronoun for another gendered form, especially in the LGBTQ community. When used by gay and queer men, this would entail using the pronoun she instead of he, also known as she-ing. Some lesbians and queer women use he/him pronouns in a similar fashion.

Often used in the British slang Polari, as well as other forms of LGBTQ language around the world, she-ing has been evidenced across the centuries, both as a way to disguise the subject of one's discussions in public and as a form of endearment. It is often associated with camp and drag culture. She-ing has also been noted in Israel, Russia, Peru, the Philippines, Brazil, and South Africa. Objects can also be referred to as she.

== See also ==
- LGBTQ slang
- Polari
- Epicenity
- Rolling pronouns
