= Hijra Farsi =

Argot of the Hijra people

- Koti Farsi
- Native to: India, Pakistan
- Native speakers: unknown (2017)
- Language family: Indo-European: Indo-Iranian; Indo-Aryan; Hijra Farsi

Language codes
- ISO 639-3: None (mis)
- Glottolog: None

Hijra Farsi is a secret language spoken by South-Asian Hijra and Kothi (also Koti) communities. Hijras are a marginalized transgender community that live in sequestered groups in many cities of India and Pakistan. The language, also known as Koti Farsi, is spoken by the Hijra community throughout Pakistan and North India. Despite what its name suggests, the language is based on local languages rather than Farsi. The sentence structure is similar to local languages, but noticeable distinctions exist. Hijra Farsi is mainly spoken by Muslim Hijras; Hindu Hijras speak the Gupti language and its regional dialects.

Even though the language is not actually based on Persian (Farsi), the hijras consider the language to be related to the language of the Mughal Empire, which they associate with the origin of Hijra identity. Hijra Farsi is most similar to local languages, but is not intelligible to speakers of local languages due to distinctive intonation and a large amount of distinctive vocabulary.

== History ==
Hijra Farsi has no documented history, but linguist and anthropologist Kira Hall has found indications of its existence from the early 1800s. Hijras enjoyed a high status during the Mughal empire, whose court and prestige language was Persian, which may be the reason why the language is named after 'Farsi' despite its dissimilarity with Persian. With the fall of the Mughal empire and start of British colonial rule, eunuchs were pushed into a more marginalized position. Colonial laws criminalized their choice of dress, as well as the public dancing they regularly engaged in. The crackdown caused hijras to become protective of their language, which then evolved into a survival tool.

That the language is still in use may have to do with the fact that the community continues to be persecuted in independent India. "Seventy-four percent of the Hijra community has suffered violence and harassment,” says Simran Shaikh, who works with Alliance India, an NGO that works on AIDS prevention.

== Community-building tool ==
Hijra Farsi began and has continued as a learned, as opposed to a mother, tongue. The language is introduced to newcomers when they enter the hijra community, together with the group’s alternative family structure, cultural norms, and other traditions. Having a language that creates a sense of a community is a necessity for hijras, who typically give up a great deal when they join the community. Hijras see the language as something that is truly theirs, and speak about it with pride.

== Examples ==
The following examples are adapted from Awan & Sheeraz (2011), who researched Hijra Farsi in the communities within Dera Ghazi Khan and Rawalpindi. Note that the transcriptions are taken directly from the text, which does not specify a distinction between retroflex and dental plosives, nor does it consistently mark a distinction between /ɐ/ and /a/. They do, however, mention that /ɽ/ is a very common sound used in Hijra Farsi, especially compared to its frequency in other languages in contact.

=== Nouns ===
English	Gender	Hijra Farsi (sg)	Hijra Farsi (pl)	Punjabi	Saraiki/Sindhi
face	M	khombaɽ	khomaɽ	monh	munhk
nose	M	nakɽa	nakɽey	nak	nak
eye	F	chamɽri	chamɽian	akh	akh
tummy	M	dhhambɽa	dhamɽey	tidh	dhidh
tummy	F	dambɽi	dambɽian	tidh	dhidh
moustache	M	choochkey	choochkey	muchh	muchh
pubic	M	reskey	reskey	chuan	bood
tooth	M	nejma	nejme	dand	dand
skin	F	chamki	chamkian	chum	chum
breast	M	chhalka	chhalkey	than	thanɽ
Neovagina (sic)	F	chapti	chaptian	n/a	n/a
penis	M	leekaɽ	leekaɽ	laoɽa	lun
hips	F	vatal	vatal	bund	chut
vagina	F	seepo	seepo	phudi	budi

This refers to the grammatical gender of the noun in Hijra Farsi

Many of these words are completely dissimilar to any of the locally spoken languages, but the pluralization strategies remain identical, i.e. nouns ending in what is transcribed here as -i are made plural by adding -an (/-i/ becomes /-ijã/), and nouns ending in -a replace the ending with plural suffix -e (/-a/ becomes /-e/).

=== Verbs ===
Awan & Sheeraz also give examples of verbs:

English	Hijra Farsi	Punjabi	Saraiki
to go	vogna	janɽa, anɽa	wanjanɽ, avanɽ
to understand	chamna	samajhna	samjhanɽ
to die	lugiɽna	marna	maranɽ

These verbs are given with the -na infinitival suffix, but that is only representative of the Rawalpindi variety: Awan and Sheeraz report that -anɽ endings are found specifically in the Dera Ghazi Khan variety, attributing it to the fact that Saraiki is more widely spoken there. Another such example is given with the feminine singular habitual form of the verb meaning "to do/make": whereas in Rawalpindi kerdi is used, demonstrating greater influence from Punjabi kardi, Dera Ghazi Khan Hijra Farsi uses krendi, which resembles the Saraiki kareyndi.

=== Function words ===
In addition to content words, Hijra Farsi demonstrates innovation (i.e. divergence from related languages) in some function words. Namely, in Lucknow, Nagar (2008) found the pronouns humsio ("I", 1st person), tumsio ("you", 2nd person), and ojo ("he/she", 3rd person), and the augmentative adiyal ("very"). The number of these pronouns is unclear in Nagar's thesis. In Rawalpindi and Dera Ghazi Khan, Awan and Sheeraz found hamala to be the 1st person pronoun, with tamala as the 2nd person.

In addition to pronouns, there is innovation in demonstratives: unlike surrounding languages, there is no proximal/distal distinction, and unlike surrounding languages, there is a gender distinction: insa for masculine and insi for feminine, both using productive plural morphology such that masculine "these" will be inse and feminine "these" will be insian (as transcribed by Awan & Sheeraz).

=== Numbers ===
Hijra Farsi's counting system, used specifically for counting money, uses lexemes unique to the cant:

Number	Hijra Farsi
10	dasola
50	adhi vadvi/adhi vadmi
100	vadvi/vadmi
500	panj vadvi/panj vadmi
1000	katka
100000 or 10000	nira patt*

Awan & Sheeraz list this number as one hundred thousand, and Kundalia lists it as ten thousand.
