= Cant =

Linguistic term for jargon of a group

A cant is the jargon or language of a group, often employed to exclude or mislead people outside the group. It may also be called a cryptolect, argot, pseudo-language, anti-language or secret language. Each term differs slightly in meaning; their uses are inconsistent.

== Etymology ==
There are two main schools of thought on the origin of the word cant:

- In linguistics, the derivation is normally seen to be from the Irish word caint (older spelling cainnt), "speech, talk", or Scottish Gaelic cainnt. It is seen to have derived amongst the itinerant groups of people in Ireland and Scotland, who hailed from both Irish/Scottish Gaelic and English-speaking backgrounds, ultimately developing as various creole languages. However, the various types of cant (Scottish/Irish) are mutually unintelligible. The Irish creole variant is termed "the cant". Its speakers from the Irish Traveller community know it as Gammon, while the linguistic community identifies it as shelta.
- Outside Gaelic circles, the derivation is typically seen to be from Latin cantāre, 'to sing', via Norman French canter. Within this derivation, the history of the word is seen to have referred to the chanting of friars initially, used disparagingly some time between the 12th and 15th centuries. Gradually, the term was applied to the singsong of beggars and eventually a criminal jargon.

== Argot ==
An argot (English: /ˈɑːrɡoʊ/, /-ɡət/; from French argot [aʁɡo] 'slang') is a language used by various groups to prevent outsiders from understanding their conversations. The term argot is also used to refer to the informal specialized vocabulary from a particular field of study, occupation, or hobby, in which sense it overlaps with jargon.

In his 1862 novel Les Misérables, Victor Hugo refers to that argot as both "the language of the dark" and "the language of misery".

The earliest known record of the term argot in this context was in a 1628 document. The word was probably derived from the contemporary name les argotiers, given to a group of thieves at that time.

Under the strictest definition, an argot is a proper language with its own grammatical system. Such complete secret languages are rare because the speakers usually have some public language in common, on which the argot is largely based. Such argots are lexically divergent forms of a particular language, with a part of its vocabulary replaced by words unknown to the larger public; argot used in this sense is synonymous with cant. For example, argot in this sense is used for systems such as verlan and louchébem, which retain French syntax and apply transformations only to individual words (and often only to a certain subset of words, such as nouns, or semantic content words). Such systems are examples of argots à clef, or "coded argots".

Specific words can go from argot into everyday speech or the other way. For example, modern French loufoque 'crazy', 'goofy', now common usage, originated in the louchébem transformation of Fr. fou 'crazy'.

In the field of medicine, physicians have been said to have their own spoken argot, cant, or slang, which incorporates commonly understood abbreviations and acronyms, frequently used technical colloquialisms, and many everyday professional slang words (that may or may not be institutionally or geographically localized). While many of these colloquialisms may prove impenetrable to most lay people, few seem to be specifically designed to conceal meaning from patients (perhaps because standard medical terminology would usually suffice anyway).

== Anti-language ==
The concept of the anti-language was first defined and studied by the linguist Michael Halliday, who used the term to describe the lingua franca of an anti-society. An anti-society is a small, separate community intentionally created within a larger society as an alternative to or resistance of it. For example, Adam Podgórecki studied one anti-society composed of Polish prisoners; Bhaktiprasad Mallik of Sanskrit College studied another composed of criminals in Calcutta.

These societies develop anti-languages as a means to prevent outsiders from understanding their communication and as a manner of establishing a subculture that meets the needs of their alternative social structure. Anti-languages differ from slang and jargon in that they are used solely among ostracized social groups, including prisoners, criminals, homosexuals, and teenagers. Anti-languages use the same basic vocabulary and grammar as their native language in an unorthodox fashion. For example, anti-languages borrow words from other languages, create unconventional compounds, or utilize new suffixes for existing words. Anti-languages may also change words using metathesis, reversal of sounds or letters (e.g., apple to elppa), or substituting their consonants. Therefore, anti-languages are distinct and unique and are not simply dialects of existing languages.

In his essay "Anti-Language", Halliday synthesized the research of Thomas Harman, Adam Podgórecki, and Bhaktiprasad Mallik to explore anti-languages and the connection between verbal communication and the maintenance of a social structure. For this reason, the study of anti-languages is both a study of sociology and linguistics. Halliday's findings can be compiled as a list of nine criteria that a language must meet to be considered an anti-language:

- An anti-society is a society set up within another society as a conscious alternative to it.
- Like the early records of the languages of exotic cultures, the information usually comes to us as word lists.
- The simplest form taken by an anti-language is that of new words from old: it is a language relexicalised.
- The principle is that of same grammar, different vocabulary.
- Effective communication depends on exchanging meanings that are inaccessible to the layperson.
- The anti-language is not just an optional extra; it is the fundamental element in the existence of the "second life" phenomenon.
- The most important vehicle of reality-maintenance is conversation. All who employ this same form of communication are reality-maintaining others.
- The anti-language is a vehicle of resocialisation.
- There is continuity between language and anti-language.

Examples of anti-languages include Cockney rhyming slang, CB slang, verlan, the grypsera of Polish prisons, thieves' cant, Polari, and Bangime.

=== In popular culture ===
Anti-languages are sometimes created by authors and used by characters in novels. These anti-languages do not have complete lexicons, cannot be observed in use for linguistic description, and therefore cannot be studied in the same way a language spoken by an existing anti-society would. However, they are still used in the study of anti-languages. Roger Fowler's "Anti-Languages in Fiction" analyzes Anthony Burgess's A Clockwork Orange and William S. Burroughs' Naked Lunch to redefine the nature of the anti-language and to describe its ideological purpose.

A Clockwork Orange is a popular example of a novel where the main character is a teenage boy who speaks an anti-language called Nadsat. This language is often referred to as an argot, but it has been argued that it is an anti-language because of the social structure it maintains through the social class of the droogs.

== Regional usage of term ==
In parts of Connacht, in Ireland, cant mainly refers to an auction, typically on fair day ("Cantmen and Cantwomen, some from as far away as Dublin, would converge on Mohill on a Fair Day, ... set up their stalls ... and immediately start auctioning off their merchandise") and secondly means talk ("very entertaining conversation was often described as 'great cant'" or "crosstalk").

In Scotland, two unrelated creole languages are termed cant. Scottish Cant (a mixed language, primarily Scots and Romani with Scottish Gaelic influences) is spoken by lowland Roma groups. Highland Traveller's Cant (or Beurla Reagaird) is a Gaelic-based cant of the Indigenous Highland Traveller population. The cants are mutually unintelligible.

In June 2009, it was reported that inmates in one English prison were using "Elizabethan cant" as a means of communication that guards would not understand, although the words used are not part of the canon of recognised cant.

The word has also been used as a suffix to coin names for modern-day jargons such as "medicant", a term used to refer to the type of language employed by members of the medical profession that is largely unintelligible to lay people.

== Examples ==
- Adurgari, from Afghanistan
- Agbirigba, from Nigeria
- Äynu, from China
- Back slang, from London, United Kingdom
- Bahasa G, from Indonesia
- Banjački, from Serbia
- Barallete, from Galicia, Spain
- Bargoens, from the Netherlands
- Bron from León and Asturias, Spain
- Beurla Reagaird, a Gaelic-based cant used by Highland Traveller community in Scotland
- Boontling from California
- Botanical Latin
- Caló (Chicano), from the US/Mexican border
- Cockney Rhyming Slang, from London, United Kingdom
- Engsh, from Kenya
- Fala dos arxinas, from Galicia, Spain
- Fenya from Russia
- Gacería, from Spain
- Gayle language, from South African gay culture
- Gender transposition
- Germanía, from Spain
- Grypsera, from Poland
- Guene, a secret language employed by enslaved people and their descendants in Curaçao and Bonaire.
- Gumuțeasca, from Romania
- Gyaru-moji, from Japan
- Hijra Farsi, from South Asia, used by the hijra and kothi subcultures (traditional indigenous approximate analogues to LGBT subcultures)
- IsiNgqumo, from South Africa and Zimbabwe
- Iyaric, from Jamaica, used by adherents of Rastafari
- Javanais, from France
- Jejemon, from the Philippines
- Joual, from Quebec French
- Kaliarda, from Greek, used by LGBT community.
- Klezmer-loshn, from Eastern Europe
- Korean ginseng-harvesters' cant, from Korea
- Leet (or 1337 speak), from internet culture
- Louchébem, from France
- Lóxoro, from Peru
- Lubunca, from Turkey, used by LGBT community.
- Lunfardo, from Argentina and Uruguay
- Martian language, to replace Chinese characters
- Meshterski, from Bulgaria
- Miguxês, from the emo, hipster subcultures of young netizens in Brazil
- Minderico, a sociolect or a secret language traditionally spoken by tailors and traders in Minde, Portugal.
- Nadsat, a fictional argot
- Nihali, from India
- Nyōbō kotoba, from Japan
- Padonkaffsky jargon (or Olbanian) from Runet, Russia
- Phasa Lu, from Thailand, used by LGBTQ community
- Pig Latin
- Pitkernese
- Podaná, from Greece
- Pajubá, from Brazil a dialect of the gay subculture that uses African or African-sounding words as slang, heavily borrowed from the Afro-Brazilian religions
- Polari, a general term for a diverse but unrelated group of dialects used by actors, circus and fairground showmen, gay subculture, criminal underworld (criminals, prostitutes).
- Rotvælsk, from Denmark
- Rotwelsch, from Germany
- Šatrovački, from the former Yugoslavia
- Scottish Cant, a variant of Scots and Romani used by the Lowland Romani people in Scotland, United Kingdom
- Shelta, from the Irish Travellers community in Ireland
- Sheng from Kenya
- Spasell, from Italy
- Swardspeak (or Bekimon, or Bekinese), from the Philippines
- Thieves' cant (or peddler's French, or St Giles' Greek), from the United Kingdom
- Tōgo, from Japan (a back slang)
- Totoiana, from Romania
- Tsotsitaal, from South Africa
- Tutnese, from the United States
- Verlan, from France
- Xíriga, from Asturias, Spain
- Zargari, from Iran

=== Thieves' cant ===
The thieves' cant was a feature of popular pamphlets and plays, particularly between 1590 and 1615, but continued to feature in literature through the 18th century. There are questions about how genuinely the literature reflected vernacular use in the criminal underworld. A thief in 1839 claimed that the cant he had seen in print was nothing like the cant then used by "gypsies, thieves, and beggars." He also said that each of these used distinct vocabularies, which overlapped, the gypsies having a cant word for everything, and the beggars using a lower style than the thieves.

== See also ==
- Code word (figure of speech)
- Code talker
- Costermonger
- Doublespeak
- Gibberish (language game)
- Jargon
- Lazăr Șăineanu, a Romanian who studied such languages
- Microculture
- Obfuscation
- Patois
- Rhyming slang
- Shibboleth

By ISO 639-3 code
Enter an ISO code to find the corresponding language article.
