= Police abuse =

Police abuse may refer to:

- Police misconduct — improper or unlawful behaviour by law enforcement officers.
- Police brutality — the use of excessive force by law enforcement officers.
- Police corruption — when a law enforcement officer abuses their power or authority for personal gain
