= LGBTQ linguistics =

Study of language used by LGBTQ people

LGBTQ linguistics is the study of language as used by members of LGBTQ communities. Related or synonymous terms include lavender linguistics, advanced by William Leap in the 1990s, which "encompass[es] a wide range of everyday language practices" in LGBTQ communities, and queer linguistics, which refers to the linguistic analysis concerning the effect of heteronormativity on expressing sexual identity through language. The former term derives from the longtime association of the color lavender with LGBTQ communities. "Language", in this context, may refer to any aspect of spoken or written linguistic practices, including speech patterns and pronunciation, use of certain vocabulary, and, in a few cases, an elaborate alternative lexicon such as Polari.

== History ==
Early studies in the field of LGBTQ linguistics were dominated by the concept of distinct "lavender lexicons" such as that recorded by Gershon Legman in 1941. In 1995, William Leap, whose work incorporates LGBTQ culture studies, cultural theory, and linguistics, called for scholarship to move toward a fuller and more nuanced study of LGBTQ language use, especially through the foundation of the Lavender Languages and Linguistics Conference. Anna Livia and Kira Hall have noted that while research in the 1960s and 1970s on the difference between men's and women's speech made the implicit assumption that gender was the relevant way to divide the social space, there is still considerable room for linguistic research based on sexual orientation, rather than gender.

== Accents of English ==
=== Gay men ===
Linguistics research, particularly within North American English, has revealed a number of phonetically salient features used by many gay men, some of which adhere to stereotypes. Studies have repeatedly confirmed that male American English speakers are recognized as gay by their speech at rates above chance. Relevant features include what is popularly known as a gay lisp: in fact, the articulation of /s/ and /z/ with a higher frequency and longer duration than average speakers. Also, gay men may tend to lower the TRAP and DRESS front vowels, especially in "fun" or casual social situations. Many gay speech characteristics match those that other speakers use when trying to speak especially clearly or carefully, including (over-)enunciating and widening the vowel spaces in the mouth. The notion that some gay male speech entirely imitates women's speech is inaccurate, though certain vocal qualities are certainly shared between the two speech styles. Research has also shown unique speech of gay men in other languages, such as Puerto Rican Spanish and Flemish Dutch.

=== Lesbians ===
Speech scientist Benjamin Munson confirmed such features among lesbians as the use of lower pitch and more direct communication styles found in previous studies, plus more backed variants of back vowels, but he noted too that differences between lesbians and straight women are "even more subtle" than differences between gay and straight men. In one English-language experiment, listeners were unable to identify female speakers as either lesbian or straight based solely on voice. At the same time, lesbian speech studies have long been neglected, making introductory research difficult. Another study showed that speakers' self-assessed "familiarity with queer culture" had a statistically significant correlation with phonetic variation like lower median pitch and faster rate of speech, though mostly for straight women, somewhat for bisexual women, and not at all for lesbians. The study's author theorized that the straight women, aware of the study's purpose, may have been attempting to express their affinity with lesbians by adopting their stereotype of a lower pitch. Another experiment found that listeners indeed were able to accurately judge female speakers on a scale from "least" to "most likely to be a lesbian" (the slight lesbian and bisexual differences approaching statistical significance), perceiving the straight women as significantly more feminine, bisexual speakers as only slightly more, and lesbians as correlated with lower median pitch, wider pitch range, lower second formant, and more use of creaky voice. However, no direct correlations between these phonetic variables and sexual orientation were found, perhaps with listeners identifying other features that were not tested.

Linguist Robin Queen argues that analyses have been too simplistic and that a uniquely lesbian language is constructed through the combination of sometimes-conflicting stylistic tropes: stereotypical women's language (e.g. hypercorrect grammar), stereotypical nonstandard forms associated with the (male) working class (e.g. contractions), stereotypical gay male lexical items, and stereotypical lesbian language (e.g. flat intonation, cursing). Sometimes lesbians deliberately avoid stereotypical female speech, according to Queen, in order to distance themselves from "normative" heterosexual female speech patterns. Because femininity is a marked style, adopting it is more noticeable than avoiding it, which may add to the lack of socially salient styles for lesbians in contrast with socially identifiable stereotypically gay male speech. However, lesbians may have more slang than gay males, with one article listing nearly eighty common lesbian slang words for sexual acts and organs.

== Transgender linguistics ==
Linguistic research on the language of transgender communities has explored the gendered phonetic aspects of the voice, specific gendered lexical items (pronouns, identity labels, terms of address), as well as specific discursive practices within trans communities (pronoun introductions, coming out stories, linguistic activism). A trans linguistic framework has been developed and advocated for by linguist Lal Zimman. This framework not only seeks to research the linguistic features and practices of transgender people, but to foreground the knowledge and experiences of trans communities and researchers.

=== Phonetics ===
Phonetics research has shown that the physical voices of trans men (and transmasculine) and trans women (and transfeminine) individuals are often but not always affected by social and medical transition, including through voice training, laryngoplasties, feminizing hormones, masculinizing hormones, or other drugs, all of which can alter sociolinguistic characteristics. A 2006 study noted that, after undergoing five oral resonance sessions targeted at lip spreading and forward tongue carriage, ten transfeminine individuals demonstrated a general increase in the formant frequency values F1, F2, and F3 as well as the fundamental frequency value F0, meaning an overall higher vocal pitch, thus more closely approximating the desired vocal frequency of cisgender women. Lal Zimman's 2012 doctorate dissertation followed fifteen transmasculine individuals from the San Francisco Bay Area in a long-term study focused on formant and fundamental frequency, for one to two years after the start of masculinizing hormone replacement therapy (HRT), concluding that all ten underwent a drop in fundamental frequency in the early stages of HRT but that social factors also affected many of the changes in voice and mannerisms.

=== Lexicon and pronouns ===
Some research has focused on language change over time in the terminology used to talk about transgender people and communities. In the early twentieth century, the work of German sexologist Magnus Hirschfeld introduced two terms that were popularly used for transgender people throughout the Twentieth Century: transsexual and transvestite. In the 1990s, the term transgender became more widely used to refer to people who do not identify with the gender they were assigned at birth. Histories of the word transgender often attribute the coining of the term to Virginia Prince, an activist from Southern California, but note the term's rise in popularity with its use in Leslie Feinberg's book, Transgender Liberation: A Movement Whose Time has Come. In the decades following the move to "transgender" as the most widely used community label, terminology used to refer to gender diverse communities has continued to expand, especially given the rapid pace of language shift in online trans communities.

Research on the lexicon of transgender people shows that they often use creative tactics to avoid specific physical or gender-specific characteristics of genital terms, including using certain words for specific genitalia. They also use certain pronouns as singular they or neopronouns and use different morphology in cases where the morphology is traditionally linked to grammatical gender, e.g. in Spanish and Portuguese.

=== Discursive practices ===
Discursive practices that are relevant to transgender communities are also major topics of research within trans linguistics. Research on inclusive language reforms and linguistic activism has addressed ways that transgender communities have advocated for language change that recognizes the range of gender diversity. Some changes that trans advocates promote include using inclusive gender labels (e.g., 'hello everyone' as opposed to 'hello ladies and gentlemen' or 'students' as opposed to 'boys and girls') and respecting the linguistic choices of transgender people. Related to research on advocating for inclusive forms is research that explores the process of discursive self determination for transgender people, what Zimman calls "linguistic self-identification".

Other discursive practices that have been studied in trans communities are coming out stories, pronoun introductions, relationship to medical discourses, discourses of the voice and masculinity, and media representations of trans identities.

== Non-binary people ==
Non-binary people may perform gender in a unique way through language. While a majority of research on nonbinary people has focused on lexical issues, there is growing research on phonetic features of nonbinary voices as well as discursive and language ideological issues related to nonbinary language.

=== Pronouns ===
They may reject being referred to by gendered pronouns like English he or she, and use they, it, or neopronouns which are not gendered or which indicate a nonbinary gender. English examples of neopronouns go back to the 1800s with thon and e; newer pronouns include ey, em, xe, and ve. Nonbinary people may also use different words for traditionally gender-expressing relationships (e.g. partner instead of boyfriend).

The English singular they has several functions. Besides referencing to an unspecific person as in "the ideal student never forgets their homework", it is also used for specific people as in "Jayden forgot their homework". Singular they can vary in meaning, indicating either someone whose pronouns the speaker or writer does not know, or someone who is known to use they as their pronoun.

Non-binary–inclusive language includes terms besides pronouns, and depending on the language, other aspects of the language such as suffixes are also used differently. In Romance languages like French and Spanish, for example, affixes of nouns, adjectives and participles with gender agreement are changed, as well as pronouns and articles. Depending on the language and sociolinguistic factors, there are different approaches to undo the grammatical binary when speaking about people. For Spanish, the morphemes -x and -e are used, and can be seen in terms like Latinx and pronouns like elle, while in French, non-binary pronouns include iel (singular; plural: iels). Some Portuguese speakers use the pronoun elu. Research shows a wide variety of different forms used to avoid the binary. Kris Knisely states that using a comprehensible non-binary inclusive form has advantages in foreign language education.

For more gender neutral forms in different languages, see Gender neutrality in languages with gendered third-person pronouns.

=== Phonetics ===
Building off work in trans linguistics that has explored the social construction of gender through different phonetic features, some sociophonetic work has looked at the voices of nonbinary people specifically. Gratton (2016) looked at (ING) production and how nonbinary participants used variations of the feature to index nonbinary identities. Additionally, Rechsteiner and Sneller found that nonbinary speakers produce (ING) at rates unlike either male or female speakers; however, nonbinary speakers used (ING) at rates similar to other nonbinary speakers, suggesting the presence of a distinct nonbinary linguistic community.

== Slang ==
Specialized dictionaries that record gay and lesbian slang tend to revolve heavily around sexual matters, which may reflect the publications' methodological assumptions about the hyper-sexuality of conversations among LGBTQ people.

One study showed gay pornographic imagery to men and asked them to discuss the imagery, finding that conversations between gay men used more slang and fewer commonly-known terms about sexual behavior than conversations where both participants were heterosexual males or where the pair consisted of one heterosexual and one homosexual male. Methodological issues of this study may include that the findings reflect homophobia among the heterosexual participants.

Studies have also been done into whether words used within the gay community are understood by heterosexuals. A study of Deaf American Sign Language users showed that all the gay male participants understood the sign for a bathhouse and that 83% of lesbians knew the sign. This compared to zero heterosexual men and only one out of eleven heterosexual women knowing the sign.

=== "Dyke" ===
One prominent example of LGBTQ slang is the rising reappropriation among lesbians of the word "dyke". Though still in many contexts considered pejorative, "dyke" has become a symbol for increasing acceptance of the lesbian movement and identity. Lesbians themselves use it to further solidarity and unity among their community. Examples include dyke marches (female-exclusive pride parades), "dykes with tykes" (describing lesbian motherhood), Dykes to Watch Out For (a comic strip that ran for 25 years), and Dykes on Bikes (a motorcycle group that traditionally leads the San Francisco Pride parade). Like other minorities, lesbians are slowly reclaiming a word that was once used to hurt them in the past. This even had legal repercussions, in that the "Dykes on Bikes" group was formally known as the "Women's Motorcycle Contingent" since they were refused the right to register under their preferred name by the United States Patent and Trademark Office, until 2006 when they finally were able to trademark the name, having persuaded the Office that "dyke" was not an offensive word.

=== "Faggot" ===
Faggot, often shortened to fag, is a usually pejorative term used chiefly in North America primarily to refer to a gay man or boy. Some gay men have reclaimed the term as a neutral or positive term of self-description. Alongside its use to refer to gay men in particular, it may also be used as a pejorative term for a "repellent male" or to refer to women who are lesbian. Its use has spread from the United States to varying extents elsewhere in the English-speaking world through mass culture, including film, music, and the Internet.

== Spanish slang ==
LGBTQ+ Latines make up a significant portion of the LGBTQ+ population in the US, reportedly making up 21% of the US population in 2019. Through the blend of Latin American languages, dialects, and cultural influences alongside US queer culture, queer Latines have cultivated their own vernacular of queer expression as a form of community and resilience. Academic research on Latine queer slang and linguistics examines how these linguistics differ regionally. The regional differences which separate different Latine cultures in the US are a reflection of migration paths taken from different Latin American countries into the US.

=== Cuban gay slang in Miami ===
Author Susana Peña describes the use of Cuban Spanish gay slang in Miami as a practice that illustrates the speaker as both Spanish-speaking and Cuban or Caribbean and gay. The term "perra" is one of the most used Cuban gay slang expressions, directly translated to "female dog" in English. Within the Cuban gay community the term is used to describe praise, most frequently within the drag setting. Peña explains how this term has traveled from the gay scene in Cuba to the Cuban gay scene in Miami, highlighting the linguistic migration that occurs alongside physical migration. Additionally, Cuban gay men in Miami reveal that slang expressions with Cuban roots are more relatable than those used in English speaking gay scenes. Other prominent Cuban gay slang terms include "mariquita" which is used to describe effeminate gay men, and "cantar 'La Bayamesa'" which refers to self acceptance of ones sexuality, similar to the English phrase "coming out".

=== Latina lesbian slang in the Midwest ===
Scholar Taralee Morgan conducted a study among Latina lesbians in the Midwest, noting that lesbian/Latine slang and speech is contingent on its use of feminine and masculine connotations. Though this community breaks from traditional machista values, the gendering of terms that is found in the Spanish language has crossed over into lesbian Latine vernacular. Although numerous indigenous languages persist throughout Latin America, the colonial imposition of Spanish remains an important linguistic feature of Latin America and its diasporas. In Morgan's study lesbian Spanish speakers were asked to list common slang terms used in their Spanish speaking circles. These words included "bucha, buchona, butcha, bollera, tortillera, marimacho/a, macho/a, papi, femenina, and hombruna". It is interesting to note that though these terms have gendered endings, many of them are used to describe both feminine and masculine presenting lesbians, underscoring gender fluidity in Latine queer linguistics.

=== Spanglish and code-switching ===
La Fountain-Stokes argues Spanglish's "messiness", the fact that there are no grammatical rights or wrongs, embodies queer transgression, distinguishing Latine from English slang. Spanglish and code-switching are central for Latine queer communities in the US. Switching between languages in Spanglish parallels challenges within the queer community to adhere to strict sexuality and gender categories. Spanglish's lack of rules allows for queer Latines to freely express their intersectional identities with smaller fears of judgment or exclusion. The use of Spanish and Spanglish among Latine queer communities fosters a sense of culture as well as the rejection of white queer linguistics.

=== Language as a form of resistance ===
Much of mainstream culture views queer language and terms as "cool", silencing the fact that much of queer slang and linguistics was created by Black and Latine queer communities as a form of survival. Differences in region, country of origin, and queer cultural expression create a range of slang used by queer Latine individuals to feel seen among one another in a world where others exclude them. Latine scholars reflect on the safe communities and environments built in places of constant change and transformation like the US-Mexico border. Researcher Edgard Alexis Amaro Martínez connects this to the duality of community and a constant need for survival that is found in urban hubs among queer Latine communities. This community building birthed new ideas, new forms of expression, and new vocabulary through slang.

=== The effects of machismo ===
Traditional toxic masculinity prevails in the Latine community due to a society that operates through patriarchal norms and expectations. Scholars connect Latine queer slang to machismo present in Latine cultures, illustrating how certain terms challenge traditional gender structures. Thus, Spanglish and Spanish slang among the queer community serves as a form of expression, but also breaks cultural and political norms that are deeply rooted for Latines.

== Theories ==
Traditionally it was believed that one's way of speaking is a result of one's identity, but the postmodernist approach reversed this theory to suggest that the way we talk is a part of identity formation, specifically suggesting that gender identity is variable and not fixed. In the early 20th century sexuality-related theories about language were common (for example, Freud and his theories of psychoanalysis), using a quite different basis from that used by modern studies on this topic. One of these early views was that homosexuality was a pathology. In the 1980s, however the LGBTQ community was increasingly viewed as an oppressed minority group, and scholars began to investigate the possibility of characterizing gay language use in a different way, influenced in part by studies of African-American Vernacular English. There was a shift in beliefs from language being a result of identity to language being employed to reflect a shared social identity and even to create sexual or gender identities.

=== Language use as performance ===
Shared ways of speaking can be used to create a single, cohesive identity that in turn help organize political struggle. Sexuality is one form of social identity, discursively constructed and represented. This shared identity can in some cases be strengthened through shared forms of language use and used for political organizing. Language can be used to negotiate relations and contradictions of gender and sexual identities, and can index identity in various ways, even if there is no specific gay or lesbian code of speaking.

Gay men and lesbians may, through the use of language, form speech communities. A speech community is a community that shares linguistic traits and tends to have community boundaries that coincide with social units. Membership in speech communities is often assumed based on stereotypes about the community as defined by non-linguistic factors. Speakers may resist culturally dominant language and oppose cultural authority by maintaining their own varieties of speech.

Gender performativity relates to speech in that people may consciously or unconsciously modify their speech styles to conform with their gender role, which men often pick speech styles that reflect the culturally defined standards of masculinity. Gay men may be associated with "femininity" in their speech styles because others perceive that their speech performance does not conform with their gender.

For example, in the west, parodies of gay styles employ resources that are heard as hyper-feminine, supporting that gay speech is feminine. However, because many speech varieties associated with 'masculinity' are learned and not biological, certain gay men may be using a wider variety of speech than a stereotypical 'masculine' male.

These stylistic innovations are made possible by the iterability of speech, and are used to index elements of identity that often do not conform with the gender binary. Conversely, lesbian women already have a wider variety of speech available, yet refrain from using a distinctive style of speech. Masculinity, and speech associated with a heterosexual male, is constrained by cultural expectations for men to avoid 'abjection' (as further elaborated in Gender Trouble); power differences amongst the genders may lead to speakers adopting different speech styles that conform with their identities, or expected gender performances (e.g. adolescent males often use the term 'fag' to police one another, which challenges their sexual orientation through gender performance, and reinforces the avoidance of the 'abject' or femininity). 'Masculine' speech is associated with non-feminine sounding speech and because some gay men may not wish to identify with straight masculine speech in some contexts, they may access other speech styles to convey their identity (because the possibilities have two options, 'masculine' or 'feminine,' to be not-'masculine' is often associated with 'feminine'). The boundary between 'masculine' and 'feminine' is maintained by cultural norms and societal orders, that do not permit masculinity to include femininity, the abject.

Language use can also mimic culturally dominant forms or stereotypes. Performing identity can only work as long as the indexes used are conventional and socially recognized, which is why stereotypes are sometimes adopted. Community members can establish their affiliation with the group through shared ways of speaking, acting, and thinking. Such discourses may in turn reproduce or modify social relationships. Sometimes, however, such a code may fall out of use when it becomes widely known and therefore no longer exclusive, as occurred with Polari after it was used on the BBC.

In a particular example of how this process of language community formation happens in a specific LGBTQ community, transgender people and transvestites may use vocabulary that includes members and excludes non-members to establish social identity and solidarity and to exclude outsiders. As these social groups are particularly likely to be viewed negatively by outsiders, the use of a private language can serve to keep membership in the group a secret to outsiders while allowing group members to recognize their own.

Some members of a community may use stylistic and pragmatic devices to index and exaggerate orientations and identities, but others may deliberately avoid stereotypical speech. Gender is frequently indexed indirectly, through traits that are associated with certain gender identities. In this way, for example, speaking forcefully is associated with masculinity but also with confidence and authority. Similarly, LGBTQ speech has a relationship with the speaker's community of practice. Speakers may have a shared interest, and respond to a mutual situation, and through communicating regularly they may develop certain speech norms. The innovative speech norms that LGBTQ people may use within their communities of practice can be spread through institutions like schools where person of many classes, races, and genders come together. These particular speech traits may be spread through the adoption of use by people with association to LGBTQ identities.

=== Goals of distinctive language use among gay men ===
People often are members of multiple communities, and which community they want to be most closely associated with may vary. For some gay men, the primary self-categorization is their identity as gay men. To achieve recognition as such, gay men may recognize and imitate forms of language that reflect the social identity of gay men, or which are stereotypically considered to be characteristic to gay men. For example, the use of female pronouns dissociates gay men from heterosexual norms and designates them in opposition to heterosexual masculinity. The reason for using female pronouns and the frequency of use may vary, however. For example, they may be used only in jest, or may be used more seriously to stabilize a group of gay men and bond its members together.

=== Goals of distinctive language use among lesbians and heterosexual women ===
The development of gay identity may differ for men and women. For many women, regardless of orientation, female identity is more important than sexual identity. Where gay men feel a need to assert themselves against male heterosexual norms, lesbians may be more concerned about sexism than about lesbian identity.

Most studies of lesbian speech patterns focus on conversational patterns, as in Coates and Jordan (1997) and Morrish and Saunton (2007). Women draw on a variety of discourses, particularly feminist discourses, to establish themselves as not submissive to heteropatriarchy by using cooperative all-female talk, which is marked by less distinct turns and a more collaborative conversational environment. Often the conversational bond between women overrides their sexual identities. However, the content of lesbian discourse can separate those who use it from heteronormativity and the values of dominant cultures. Collaborative discourse involves resisting dominant gender norms through more subtle creation of solidarity, and not necessarily resisting "gender-typical" linguistic behavior.

An example of a distinctive way of speaking for a female community is that of female bikers. Dykes on Bikes, a mostly lesbian group, and Ladies of Harley, a mostly heterosexual group, have demonstrated shared experiences. Though the two cultures differ, both have a focus on female bonding and motorcycles and have a shared female biker language. Their shared language helps to establish their shared identity in a largely male-dominated domain and to mark boundaries between them and traditional femininity.

=== Changing styles of speech ===
Changing speech styles can indicate which identity individuals want to put forward as primary at a given time. Code-switching is often used to describe the switching of languages or language styles, within a sentence or conversation. Raciolinguistic scholars discuss code switching in terms of race, but as discussed, language also forms gender & sex through systemic designs that influence social concepts. Choices of slang use among gay men depend on the audience and context, and shift depending on situational needs such as the need to demonstrate or conceal gay identity in a particular environment. Likewise, lesbians may foreground lesbian identity in some contexts but not in others. Podesva discusses an example of code-switching where a gay lawyer is being interviewed about anti-gay discrimination on the radio, so he balances the need to sound recognizably gay and the need to sound recognizably educated, since "gay speech" tends to be associated with frivolity and lack of education.

"Exploratory switching" can be used to determine whether an interlocutor shares the speaker's identity. For example, a gay man might use certain key words and mannerisms generally known by the community as a test to see whether they are recognized by the interlocutor. This allows the gay man to establish solidarity with a community member previously unknown to him without having to disclose his orientation to a heterosexual and potentially hostile person. However, inconsistency of language use between different sub-groups of the LGBTQ community, along with the existence of non-members who may be familiar with a gay mode of speech, can make such exploratory switching unreliable.

People may also use code-switching to comment on society or for entertainment. Black drag performers often use stereotypical "female white English" to disrupt societal assumptions about gender and ethnicity and to express criticisms of these assumptions. Imitations do not necessarily represent actual language use of a group, but rather the generally recognized stereotypical speech of that group. In the language of drag performers, language play is also marked by juxtaposition of contradictory aspects such as very proper language mixed with obscenities, adding to the queens' and kings' deliberate disruption of cultural and linguistic norms.

=== Issues with studying speech patterns in relation to sexuality and sexual identity ===
Don Kulick argues that the search for a link between sexual identity categories and language is misplaced, since studies have failed to show that the language gay men and lesbians use is unique. Kulick argues that though some researchers may be politically motivated to imagine an LGBTQ community that is a unified whole and identifiable through linguistic means, this speech community does not necessarily exist as such. Kulick points out that the LGBTQ community is not homogeneous, nor is its language use. Features of "gay speech" are not used consistently by gay individuals, nor are they consistently absent from the speech of all heterosexual individuals. Further, Kulick takes issue with frequently circular definitions of queer speech. He argues that speech patterns cannot be labelled LGBTQ language simply because they are used by LGBTQ people.

Studies of a speech community that presuppose the existence of that community may reproduce stereotypes that fail to accurately depict the social reality of variance among subgroups within a community and overlapping identities for individuals. Furthermore, studies of gay male language use often look at middle class European Americans who are out as gay to the exclusion of other subgroups of the LGBTQ community, and hence may draw misleading conclusions about the community as a whole.

Rusty Barrett suggests that the idea of the homogeneous speech community could perhaps be more accurately replaced by one of a queer community based on community spirit or a queer cultural system, since language use varies so greatly. Kulick proposes, instead of studying speech communities that he concludes "do not and cannot exist" because of methodological problems, researchers should study "language and desire" through examining repression in the context of linguistics, considering both what is said and what is not or cannot be said. Kulick addresses the need for consideration of the role of sexuality in sexual identity, unlike some lavender linguists who neglect sexuality in favor of linguistic features that might be more likely than sexuality to legitimize gay identity.

== Issues with over-generalizations about sexual identities and linguistic styles ==
=== Inaccuracy of metonymic models ===
George Lakoff explained the inaccuracy of metonymic models, through which people jump to conclusions without sufficient elaboration, giving rise to prototype effects, in his book Women, Fire, and Dangerous Things. First of all, we commonly consider typical examples as the better examples of a category. For instance, in the category of fruits, apples and oranges are typical examples. It is common practice that we engage in reasoning by making inferences from typical to non-typical examples. As a matter of fact, an enormous amount of our knowledge about categories of things is organized in terms of typical cases. We constantly draw inferences on the basis of that kind of knowledge. Second, salient examples, which are familiar and memorable, are unconsciously used in our understanding of things. For instance, if one's best friend is a vegetarian and they do not know any others well, they will tend to generalize from their best friend to other vegetarians. This is what Tversky and Kahneman referred to as the "conjunction fallacy". To understand this notion via probability theory, think of two mutually unrelated events. The theory assumes that the likelihood of the co-occurrence of the two events is lower than that of the occurrence of either, ignoring the fact that the two events are actually unrelated to one another. To understand this with regards to lavender linguistics, just because two individuals are both self-identified bisexual males does not necessarily mean that they must engage in the same linguistic patterns and social styles. The failure to capture this asymmetry between prototypical and non-prototypical cases results in ineffective study of lavender linguistics. Typical and salient examples are just two kinds of metonymic models. Others include social stereotypes, ideal cases, paragons, generators, and submodels.

=== Presence of overlaps ===
A significant multitude of scholastic studies have shown that the linguistic styles of LGBTQ and straight people are not mutually exclusive. Munson et al. (2006), for instance, examined the gradient nature of perceived sexual orientation by having 40 listeners rate 44 talkers' sexual orientation on a five-point equally appearing interval scale. The 44 talkers included equal number of LGBTQ and straight people. When averaged across the 40 listeners, ratings for individual talkers showed some overlap between LGBTQ and straight people. For example, the two men who were tied with the most-gay average ratings included one self-identified straight man, and one self-identified gay man. While there are group level differences between LGBTQ and straight people in the gay soundness of their voices, overlap does exist, providing a serious challenge to a simple model in which speech differences were the inevitable consequence of sexual orientation. The fact that there is no clean cut between the linguistic patterns of LGBTQ and straight people suggests that too many generalizations in the study of language and gender can be dangerous.

=== Multiplicity of social identity ===
Contemporary sociolinguistic studies suggest that styles are learned, rather than assigned at the time of birth. With that said, identities emerge in a time series of social practice, through the combined effects of structure and agency. Because social identities are not static, the speech community model, which was traditionally employed as a sociolinguistic framework in the study of language and gender, is not as reliable as the community of practice model, the new framework emerged from practice theory. Also, because social identities are not static, speech styles are actively subject to change, such that one's speech styles have different social meanings across time. Similarly, it is possible for an individual to engage in multiple identity practices simultaneously, and move from one identity to another unconsciously and automatically, and thus the term polyphonous identity. Podesva (2004) is a paper that studies recordings of a gay medical student, whom he called "Heath", as he moved through different situations in the course of his everyday life. The fact that Heath's pronunciation of the voiceless alveolar stop, /t/, varies when he deals with different groups of people suggest not only some of gay people's speech features, but also the multiplicity of a person's social identity. Furthermore, Podesva also examined the relationship between the California Vowel Shift (CVS) and the gay identity, again by investigating intra-speaker patterns in a single individual, Regan, as opposed to inter-speaker variation, and found that Regan, who is a self-identified gay Asian American, realized CVS differently depending on the context, whether it be a "boys' night out", "dinner with friend", or "meeting with supervisor". This cross-situational patterns are critical in the sense that an individual's speech styles can change not only across time, but also across space, depending on which social identity the individual is attempting to engage in under a given situation. Overgeneralizations of social identity, however, overlook this intra-speaker variability.

=== Examples of non-Western sexual identities and their language use ===
According to many language scholars, it is misleading to assume that all sex and gender roles are the same as those that are salient within Western society or that the linguistic styles associated with given groups will be like the styles associated with similarly identified Western groups.

==== Bakla ====
Baklas are homosexual Filipino men, but the concept of bakla identity does not map cleanly to Western male homosexuality. With baklas, as with other non-Western sexual minority groups, sexual identity is very closely related to gender identity. Baklas often assume female attributes and dress like women. They also use female terms for themselves and occasionally for their body parts, and are sometimes referred to and refer to themselves as not being "real men".

Although they have contact with other gay cultures through technology, bakla culture remains fairly distinct. They have their own rapidly shifting linguistic code called Swardspeak, which is influenced by Spanish and English loan words. This code mostly consists of lexical items, but also includes sound changes such as [p] to [f]. Some baklas who move to the United States continue to use this code, but others abandon it, regarding it as a Filipino custom that is out of place abroad and replacing it with aspects of American gay culture.

==== Hijras ====
Hijras are Indians who refer to themselves as neither man nor woman. Some describe hijras as a "third sex". Their identity is distinct from a Western gay or transgender identity, though many hijras have male sexual partners. There is a distinctive mode of speech often attributed to hijras, but it is stereotypical, and frequently derogatory. It is often the standard for Hijras to adopt feminine mannerisms, feminine gender agreement when addressing the self or other Hijaras, and pronouns, depending on context and their interlocutors, to create solidarity or distance. They also use stereotypically male elements of speech, such as vulgarity. Hijras often refer to themselves as masculine in the past tense and females in the present. Their combined use of masculine and feminine speech styles can be seen as reflecting their ambiguous sexual identities and challenging dominant sexuality and gender ideologies. Thus, hijras use grammar as a form of resistance against gender roles.

== See also ==
- Arnold Zwicky
- Bahasa Binan
- Binnen-I, a convention for gender-neutral language in German
- Feminist language reform
- Gayle language
- Gay male speech
- Gender-neutral language
- Gender neutrality in languages with grammatical gender
- Gender-specific and gender-neutral pronouns
  - Singular they, English
  - Ri (pronoun), Esperanto
  - Elle (Spanish pronoun)
  - Hen (pronoun), Swedish
  - Iel (pronoun), French
  - Elu (Portuguese pronoun)
  - Pronoun game
- He never married
- LGBTQ culture
- LGBT linguistic profiling
- LGBTQ slang
- LGBTQ stereotypes
- IsiNgqumo
- Pajubá
- Queer theory
- Sexual identity
- Sociolinguistics
