= Bahasa Binan =

Argot spoken by homosexual communities in Indonesia

Bahasa Binan (or bahasa Béncong) is a distinctive Indonesian speech variety originating from the gay community. It has several regular patterns of word formation and is documented in both writing and speech.

One pattern of word formation modifies standard Indonesian roots (normally composed of two syllables) to have e as the first vowel and ong closing the second syllable—hence providing regular assonance with the standard Indonesian word bencong [ˈbɛntʃɔŋ], a male homosexual, trans woman, or male crossdresser.

Another word formation pattern adds -in- infixes to other Indonesian roots. The best example is the word binan itself, formed with the word banci, 'male transvestite', to which the -in- infix has been added and from which the second syllable -ci has been dropped. Bahasa Binan also uses a range of standard Indonesian words with altered meaning. The standard word for 'cat', kucing, is used in Bahasa Binan to denote a male sex worker. Another word with wide currency in Bahasa Binan, but actually typical of standard Indonesian informal word formation, is waria from wanita ('woman') + pria ('man'), meaning 'transvestite'.

== See also ==
- Ablaut
- Affix
- Gayle
- IsiNgqumo
- Morpheme
- Polari
- id:Betty Bencong Slebor (Indonesian Wikipedia)
- id:Joko Wiryanto Suwito (Indonesian Wikipedia)

== Bibliography ==
- Boellstorff, Tom (2007). A coincidence of desires: anthropology, queer studies, Indonesia. Duke University Press. ISBN 0-8223-3991-9
- Boellstorf, Tom (2005). The gay archipelago: sexuality and nation in Indonesia. Princeton University Press.
- Boellstorff, Tom (2004). "Gay language and Indonesia: registering belonging" (PDF). Journal of Linguistic Anthropology. 14 (2): 248–268. doi:10.1525/jlin.2004.14.2.248. S2CID 145251816. Archived from the original (PDF) on 2007-02-18.
- Boellstorff, Tom (2004). "Playing Back the Nation: Waria, Indonesian Transvestites". Cultural Anthropology. 19 (2): 159–195. doi:10.1525/can.2004.19.2.159. S2CID 54753840.
- Boellstorff, Tom (2003). '"Authentic, of course!": gay language in Indonesia and cultures of belonging'. Chapter 7, pages 181–201 in William Leap, Tom Boellstorff (eds). Speaking in queer tongues: globalization and gay language. University of Illinois Press. ISBN 0-252-07142-5
- Offord, Baden and Leon Cantrell (2001). "Homosexual Rights as Human Rights in Indonesia". Pages 233–252 in Gerard Sullivan and Peter A. Jackson (eds). Gay and lesbian Asia: culture, identity, community. Haworth Press. ISBN 1-56023-146-7
- (in Indonesian) TYO (2005). "Bahasa 'Binan' dan Trendi". Lampung Post 23 January.
