= Pajubá =

Brazilian cryptolect

Pajubá (Portuguese pronunciation: [paʒuˈba]), or Bajubá, is a Brazilian cryptolect which inserts numerous words and expressions from West African languages into the Portuguese language. It is spoken by practitioners of Afro-Brazilian religions, such as Candomblé and Umbanda, and by the Brazilian LGBT community. Its source languages include Umbundu, Kimbundo, Kikongo, Egbá, Ewe, Fon and Yoruba. It also includes words borrowed from Spanish, French, and English, as well as words of Portuguese origin with altered meanings.

It is also often described as "the speaking in the language of the saints" or "rolling the tongue", much used by the "saint people" (priests of African religions) when one wants to say something so that other people cannot understand.

In the travesti (Brazilian transvestite) community, Pajubá is usually accompanied by exaggeratedly "queer" body language, part of an aesthetic called fexação (lit. "closing", roughly analogous to "flaming" in English) intended to subvert societal expectations to conceal or downplay one's LGBTQ identity.

== Etymology ==
In both the candomblé and the LGBTQ community, the word pajubá or bajubá means "gossip", "news", or "update", referring to other related groups or events occurring (both good things and bad things) in those circles.

== History ==
Pajubá began to be used by the LGBTQ community during the period of the military government of Brazil (1964–85) as a means of facing police repression and mislead what people could gather from what they heard. The argot was created spontaneously in regions with the strongest African presence in Brazil, such as Umbanda and Candomblé "terreiros" (religious locations), and the dialect contains many Africanisms. The dialect was later adopted as a code between travestis and later between all LGBTQ communities and sympathizers.

Diálogo das Bonecas, the first Pajubá dictionary, was conceived and launched in Brazil in 1992. Over time, and following its impact on the national cultural scene, transvestite and transgender artists such as MC Xuxu, Linn da Quebrada, Jup do Bairro, Majur and Mulher Pepita, among others, included the cryptolect in their songs.

In November 2018, a question mentioning Pajubá was included in the Exame Nacional do Ensino Médio, the national standardized high school exam.

== Examples ==
Below are some examples of Pajubá.

- Adé - gay man
- Adéfuntó - closeted gay man
- Alibã - police
- Amapô - woman
- Aqué/acué - money
- Bofe - boy
- Cacura - gay man 40 years of age or more
- Caminhoneira - homosexual woman with a masculine appearance (similar to "butch")
- Desaquendar - to untuck
- Destruidora - person who is doing something very well
- Equê - lie, deception
- Fazer a Alice - to be a dreamer/visionary
- Fazer a egípcia - to maintain a neutral facial expression/feign disinterest
- Gongar - to throw shade/to read
- Indaca/Endaca - mouth
- Neca - penis
- Ocó - man
- Oni - water
- Picumã - hair; wig
- Ravi - killer, dangerous
- Xoxar - to mock
- Xaum - meeting
