= Polari =

Form of slang

- Palare, Parlary, Palarie, Palari
- Region: United Kingdom
- Native speakers: None
- Language family: English-based slang and other Indo-European influences

Language codes
- ISO 639-3: pld
- Glottolog: pola1249

Polari (from Italian parlare 'to talk') is a form of slang or cant historically used primarily in the United Kingdom among the gay subculture, as well as some actors, circus and fairground performers, professional wrestlers, merchant navy sailors, criminals, and prostitutes.

There is some debate about its origins, but it can be traced to at least the 19th century and possibly as early as the 16th century. Polari has a long-standing connection with Punch and Judy street puppeteers, who traditionally used it to converse.

== Terminology ==
Alternative spellings include Parlare, Parlary, Palare, Palarie and Palari. The term comes from Italian parlare 'to talk'.

== Description ==
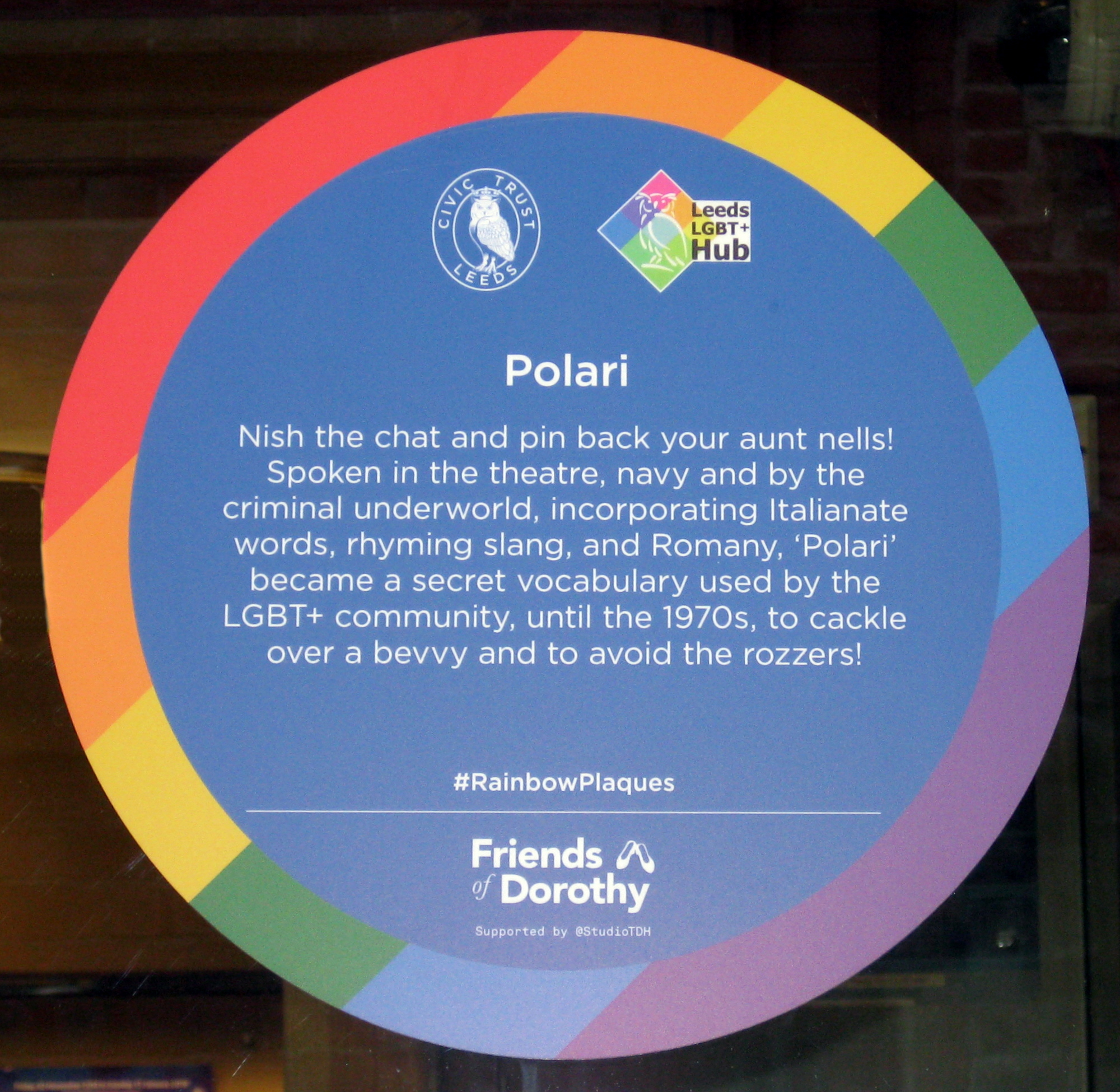
Rainbow Plaque on Leeds City Varieties theatre

Polari is primarily a mixture of Sailors' Slang (from Sabir or Mediterranean Lingua Franca) and thieves' cant (which incorporated Romani and Shelta), and 1960s drug subculture slang. It was constantly evolving, with a small core lexicon of about 20 words, including: bona (good), ajax (nearby), eek (face), cod (bad, in the sense of tacky or vile), naff (bad, in the sense of drab or dull, though borrowed into mainstream British English with a meaning more like that of cod), lattie (room, house, flat), nanti (not, no), omi (man), palone (woman), riah (hair), zhoosh or tjuz (smarten up, stylise), TBH ('to be had', sexually accessible), trade (sex) and vada (see).

There were once two distinct forms of Polari in London: an East End version which stressed Cockney rhyming slang and a West End version which stressed theatrical and classical influences. There was some interchange between the two.

When used by homosexual men, Polari also involves inverting gendered personal pronouns and names, typically switching them from male forms to female forms. For example, he may become she (known as she-ing), and the name Paul may become Pauline.

== Usage ==
From the 19th century on, Polari was used in London fish markets, theatres, fairgrounds, and circuses, hence the many borrowings from Romani. As many homosexual men worked in theatrical entertainment, it was also used among the gay subculture to disguise homosexuals from hostile outsiders and undercover policemen. It was also used extensively in the British Merchant Navy, where many gay men worked as waiters, stewards, and entertainers.

According to Oxford English Dictionary associate editor Peter Gilliver, little written evidence of Polari exists before the 1890s. The dictionary's entry for rozzer (policeman) includes a quote from P. H. Emerson's 1893 book Signor Lippo – Burnt Cork Artiste: "If the rozzers was to see him in bona clobber they'd take him for a gun." ("If the police were to see him finely dressed, they would know that he is a thief.")

The almost identical Parlyaree has been spoken in fairgrounds since at least the 17th century and is still used by show travellers in England and Scotland. As theatrical booths, circus acts, and menageries were once common parts of European fairs, it is likely that the roots of Polari/Parlyaree lie in the period before both theatre and circus became independent of fairgrounds. The Parlyaree spoken on fairgrounds tends to borrow much more from Romani, as well as other languages and cants spoken by travelling people, such as thieves' cant and back slang.

Henry Mayhew gave an account of Polari as part of an interview with a Punch and Judy showman in the 1850s. The discussion he recorded references Punch's arrival in England, crediting these early shows to an Italian performer called Porcini (John Payne Collier's account calls him Porchini, a literal rendering of the Italian pronunciation). Mayhew provides the following:

Punch Talk

"Bona Parle" means language; name of patter. "Yeute munjare" – no food. "Yeute lente" – no bed. "Yeute bivare" – no drink. I've "yeute munjare", and "yeute bivare", and, what's worse, "yeute lente". This is better than the costers' talk, because that ain't no slang and all, and this is a broken Italian, and much higher than the costers' lingo. We know what o'clock it is, besides.

Additional accounts of particular words relate to puppet performance:

- "'Slumarys' – figures, frame, scenes, properties.
- "'Slum' – call, or unknown tongue" ("unknown" is a reference to the "swazzle", a voice modifier used by Punch performers).

=== Decline ===
Polari had begun to fall into disuse among the gay subculture by the late 1960s. The popularity of the BBC radio comedy Round the Horne, with its camp gay characters Julian and Sandy, ensured that some of the Polari terms they used became public knowledge. The need for a secret means of communication in the subculture also declined with the partial decriminalisation of adult homosexual acts in England and Wales under the Sexual Offences Act 1967; in the 1970s, the gay liberation movement began to view Polari as old-fashioned and perpetuating harmful camp stereotypes.

=== Mainstream usage ===
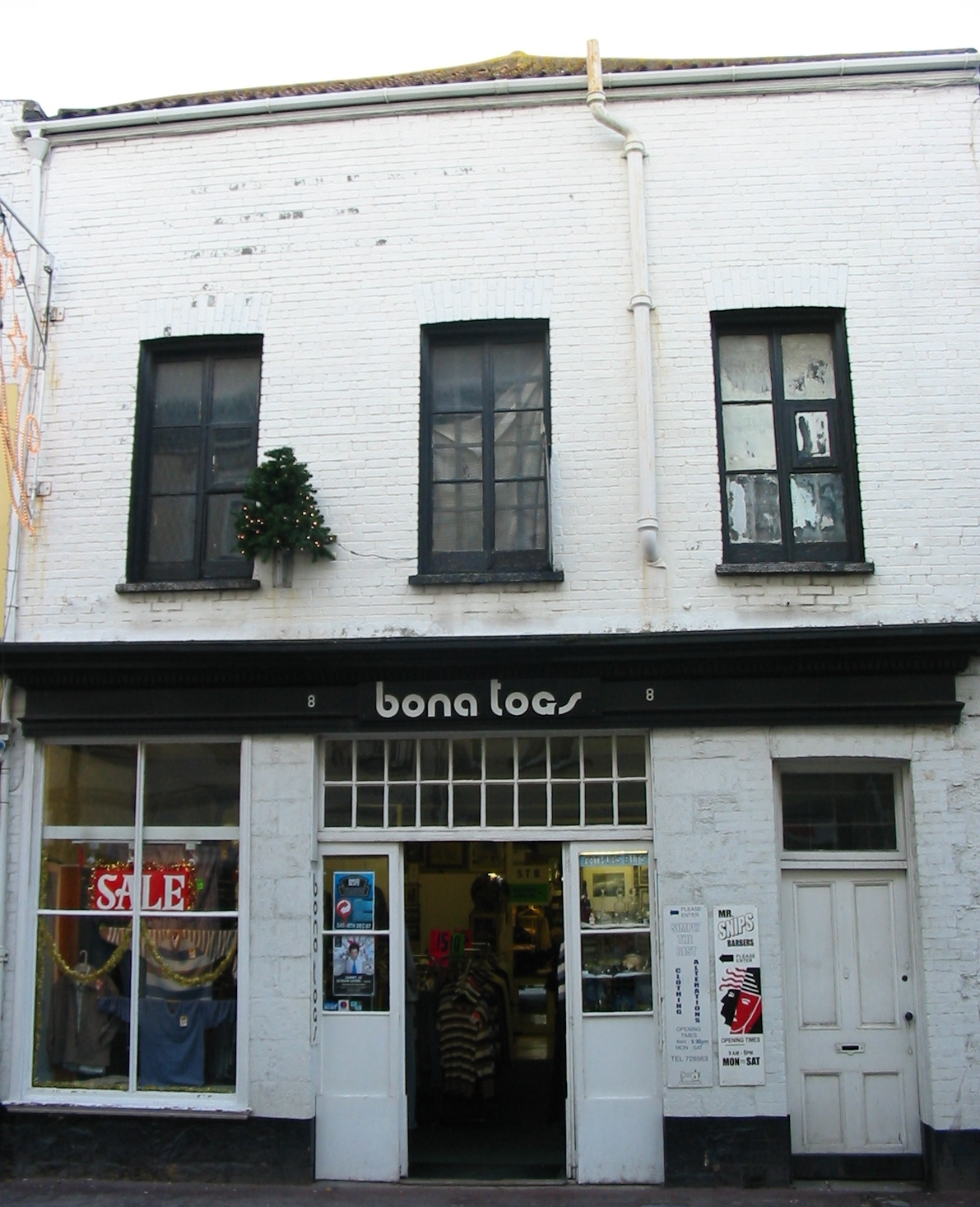
Bona Togs, a St Helier shop named in Polari

A number of words from Polari have entered mainstream slang. The list below includes words in general use with the meanings listed: acdc, barney, blag, butch, camp, khazi, cottaging, hoofer, mince, scarper, tod, [rough] trade.

The Polari word naff, meaning inferior or tacky, has an uncertain etymology. Michael Quinion says it is probably from the 16th-century Italian word gnaffa, meaning "a despicable person". There are a number of false etymologies, many based on backronyms—"Not Available For Fucking", "Normal As Fuck", etc. The phrase "naff off" was used euphemistically in place of "fuck off" along with the intensifier "naffing" in Keith Waterhouse's Billy Liar (1959). Usage of "naff" increased in the 1970s when the television sitcom Porridge employed it as an alternative to expletives which were not broadcastable at the time. Princess Anne allegedly told a reporter to "naff off" at the Badminton horse trials in April 1982. However, the photographers who were present have since stated that this was a censored version of what she actually said.

"Zhoosh" (/ʒʊʃ, ʒuːʃ/; alternatively spelled "zhuzh," "jeuje," and a number of other variety spellings), meaning to smarten up, style or improve something, became commonplace in the mid-2000s, having been used in the 2003 United States TV series Queer Eye for the Straight Guy and What Not to Wear. "Jush", an alternative spelling of the word, was popularised by drag queen Jasmine Masters after her appearance on the seventh series of RuPaul's Drag Race in 2015.

=== Legacy and revival ===
Since the late 20th and early 21st century, there has been a renewed interest in Polari, especially as a part of LGBTQ+ heritage. Gay's the Word has held workshops in Polari, the Sisters of Perpetual Indulgence have translated (partially relexified) the King James Bible into Polari, and Madame Jo Jo's nightclub in Soho taught its staff to speak Polari.

Now as reefing fakements offered unto idols, we know that we all have knowledge. Knowledge puffeth up, but charity edifieth.

— Bible into Polari 1 Corinthians 8:1 (Polari in italics)

Linguist Paul Baker attributes increased interest in Polari primarily to the growing body of academic work on the subject. Author George Reiner explains that "the revival of a language like Polari offers the possibility of an alternate queer linguistic space" at a time when closing LGBTQ+ venues and dating apps have reduced queer social spaces.

In 2007, writer and activist Paul Burston launched Polari Literary Salon in London to platform LGBTQ+ writers. He launched the Polari First Book Prize in 2011. This was followed by the Polari Prize for LGBTQ+ writers at all stages of their career in 2019 and the Polari Children's & YA Prize in 2022. Other organisations have also taken names inspired by Polari, such as Polari Magazine, Vada Magazine, and VADA LGBTQ Community Theatre Company.

In 2012 and 2013, Manchester artists Jez Dolan and Joe Richardson presented a performance-based tour and exhibition titled Polari Mission, which explored LGBTQ+ history and language use in the UK. This was presented at The John Rylands Library and Contact Theatre. In 2015, Dolan also translated sections of the 1957 Wolfenden Report into Polari for a commission from the UK Parliament. Dolan and Richardson also worked with Paul Baker to produce a 500-word dictionary of Polari as an app.

In December 2016, to launch LGBT+ History Month 2017 and celebrate the 50th anniversary of the 1967 Sexual Offences Act, poet Adam Lowe performed his Polari poem "Vada That" in Parliament's Speaker's House with accompaniment by musician Nikki Franklin. In 2017, a service at Westcott House, Cambridge was conducted in Polari. Trainee priests held the service to commemorate LGBT History Month; following media attention, Chris Chivers, the principal, expressed his regret.

In 2019, Reaktion Books published Paul Baker's third book on Polari, Fabulosa!: The Story of Polari, Britain's Secret Gay Language. His first two books on the subject (Polari: Fantabulosa: A Dictionary of Polari and Gay Slang and Polari: The Lost Language of Gay Men) were published in 2002 and 2003, respectively.

== In popular culture ==
- Polari (spelt "Polare") was popularised on the 1960s BBC radio show Round the Horne. The camp gay Polari-speaking characters Julian and Sandy were played by Hugh Paddick and Kenneth Williams.
- In the Doctor Who serial Carnival of Monsters (1973), Vorg, a showman, attempts to converse with the Doctor in Polari.
- Ralph Filthy, a theatrical agent played by Nigel Planer in the BBC TV series Filthy Rich & Catflap, regularly used Polari.
- In 1990, Morrissey released the single "Piccadilly Palare" containing a number of lyrics in Polari and exploring a subculture in which Polari was used. "Piccadilly Palare" later appeared on his compilation album Bona Drag, whose title is also taken from Polari.
- In Doom Patrol, Danny the Street often speaks Polari.
- In his 1995 novel Behind Closed Doors, Coronation Street creator Tony Warren depicts his characters using Polari on the gay scene of 1950s Manchester.
- In the 1998 film Velvet Goldmine, two characters speak Polari in a London nightclub. The scene has English subtitles in the American release of the film.
- In 2015, Brian Fairbairn and Karl Eccleston made a short film, Putting on the Dish, which features a conversation entirely in Polari.
- The song Girl Loves Me from David Bowie's 2016 album Blackstar features lyrics in both Polari and the fictional language Nadsat from the novel A Clockwork Orange.
- In 2018, George Reiner and Penny Burkett published cruising for lavs, written mostly in Polari.
- In 2019, the first opera in Polari, The Sins of the Cities of the Plain (based on the book of the same title), premiered at Espacio Turina in Seville, Spain. The libretto was written in Polari by librettist and playwright Fabrizio Funari and the music is by Germán Alonso.
- The same year, the English-language localisation of the Japanese video game Dragon Quest Builders 2 included a character called Jules, who spoke in Polari with non-standard capitalisation.
- In the 2020 film Roald & Beatrix: The Tail of the Curious Mouse, a young Roald Dahl runs away from home and meets "a silver-tongued, Polari-speaking eccentric who may be a figment of the boy's imagination" played by Bill Bailey.
- In 2023, Peepal Tree Press published Adam Lowe's debut poetry collection Patterflash, which features a number of Polari poems. The title is translated in the book's glossary as "Gossip, chat, ostentatious or pretentious speech; the lyrics pouring out of my gob".
- In the fourth episode of Funny Woman (2024), characters discuss BBC Radio using Polari in Round the Horne and visit a comedy club where gay and entertainment-industry characters converse in Polari.
- British singer Olly Alexander released his debut album Polari on 7 February 2025.

== Glossary ==
Numbers:

Number	Definition	Italian numbers
medza, medzer	half	mezza
una, oney	one	uno
dooey	two	due
tray	three	tre
quarter	four	quattro
chinker	five	cinque
say	six	sei
say oney, setter	seven	sette
say dooey, otter	eight	otto
say tray, nobber	nine	nove
daiture	ten	dieci
long dedger, lepta	eleven	undici
kenza	twelve	dodici
chenter	one hundred	cento

Some words or phrases that may derive from Polari (this is an incomplete list):

Word	Definition
acdc, bibi	bisexual
ajax	nearby (shortened form of "adjacent to")
alamo!	they're attractive! (via acronym "LMO" meaning "Lick Me Out!")
arva	to have sex (from Italian chiavare, to screw)
aunt nell	listen!
aunt nells	ears
aunt nelly fakes	earrings
barney	a fight
bat, batts, bates	shoes
bevvy	drink (diminutive of "beverage")
billy doo	love letter
bitch	effeminate or passive gay man
bijou	small/little (from French, jewel)
bitaine	whore (French putain)
blag	sexually pick up
bold	homosexual
bona	good
bona nochy	goodnight (from Italian – buona notte)
butch	masculine; masculine lesbian
buvare	a drink; something drinkable (from Italian – bere or old-fashioned Italian – bevere or Lingua Franca bevire)
cackle	talk/gossip
camp	effeminate (possibly from Italian campare or campeggiare "emphasise, make stand out") (possibly from the phrase "camp follower" those itinerants who followed behind the men in uniform/highly decorative dress)
capello, capella, capelli, kapella	hat (from Italian – cappello)
carsey, karsey, khazi	house or a toilet
cartes	penis (from Italian – cazzo)
cats	trousers
charper	to search or to look (from Italian acchiappare, to catch)
charpering omi	policeman
charver	sexual intercourse
chicken	young man
clevie	vagina
clobber	clothes
cod	bad
corybungus	backside, posterior
cottage	a public lavatory used for sexual encounters (public lavatories in British parks and elsewhere were often built in the style of a Tudor cottage)
cottaging	seeking or obtaining sexual encounters in public lavatories
cove	taxi
dhobi / dhobie / dohbie	wash (from Hindi, dohb)
Dilly boy	a male prostitute, from Piccadilly boy
Dilly, the	Piccadilly circus, a place where cruising went on
dinari	money (Latin 'denarii' was the 'd' of the pre decimal penny. This word is cognate with the Spanish word 'dinero' also meaning money)
dish	buttocks
dolly	pretty, nice, pleasant, (from Irish dóighiúil/Scottish Gaelic dòigheil, handsome, pronounced 'doil')
dona	woman (perhaps from Italian donna or Lingua Franca dona)
ecaf	face (backslang)
eek/eke	face (abbreviation of ecaf)
ends	hair
esong, sedon	nose (backslang)
fambles	hands
fantabulosa	fabulous/wonderful
farting crackers	trousers
feele / feely / filly	child/young (from the Italian figlio, for son)
feele omi / feely omi	young man
flowery	lodgings, accommodations
fogus	tobacco
fortuni	gorgeous, beautiful
fruit	gay man
funt	pound £ (Yiddish)
fungus	old man/beard
gelt	money (Yiddish)
bag	money
hoofer	dancer
HP (homy palone)	gay man, especially an effeminate one
irish	wig (from Cockney rhyming slang, "Irish jig")
jarry	food, also mangarie (from Italian mangiare or Lingua Franca mangiaria)
jubes	breasts
kaffies	trousers
lacoddy, lucoddy	body
lallies / lylies	legs, sometimes also knees (as in "get down on yer lallies")
lallie tappers	feet
latty / lattie	room, house or flat
lau	lay or place upon
lavs	words (Romani: lav word or Irish: labhairt to speak)
lills	hands
lilly	police (Lilly Law)
lyles	legs (prob. from "Lisle stockings")
luppers	fingers (from Yiddish lapa – paw)
mangarie	food, also jarry (from Italian mangiare or Lingua Franca mangiaria)
manky	worthless, dirty (from Italian mancare – "to be lacking")
martinis	hands
measures	money
medzered	divided
meese	plain, ugly (from Yiddish mieskeit, in turn from Hebrew מָאוּס repulsive, loathsome, despicable, abominable)
meshigener	nutty, crazy, mental (from Yiddish 'meshugge', in turn from Hebrew מְשֻׁגָּע crazy)
meshigener carsey	church
metzas	money (from Italian mezzi, "means, wherewithal")
mince	walk affectedly
mollying	involved in the act of sex
mogue	deceive
munge	darkness
naff	awful, dull, hetero
nana / nanna	awful
nanti	not, no, none (from Italian, niente)
national handbag	dole, welfare, government financial assistance
nishta	nothing from Yiddish nishto נישטא meaning nothing
ogle	look admiringly
ogles	eyes
oglefakes	glasses
omi	man (from Romance)
onk	nose (from "conk")
orbs	eyes
orderly daughters	police
oven	mouth (nanti pots in the oven = no teeth in the mouth)
palare / polari pipe	telephone ("talk pipe")
palliass	back
park, parker	give
plate	feet (Cockney rhyming slang "plates of meat"); to fellate
palone	woman (Italian paglione – "straw mattress"; cf. old Cant hay-bag – "woman"); also spelled "polony" in Graham Greene's 1938 novel Brighton Rock
palone-omi	lesbian
pots	teeth
quongs	testicles
reef	touch
remould	sex change
rozzer	policeman
riah / riha	hair (backslang)
riah zhoosher	hairdresser
rough trade	a working class or blue collar sex partner or potential sex partner; a tough, thuggish or potentially violent sex partner
scarper	to run off (from Italian scappare, to escape or run away or from rhyming slang "scapa flow", to go)
scharda	shame (from German schade, "a shame" or "a pity")
schlumph	drink
schmutter	apparel from Yiddish shmatte שמאטע meaning rag
schooner	bottle
scotch	leg (scotch egg=leg)
screech	mouth, speak
screeve	write (either from Irish scríobh/Scottish Gaelic sgrìobh, Scots scrieve to write or italian 'scrivere' meaning to write)
sharpy	policeman (from – charpering omi)
sharpy polone	policewoman
shush	steal (from client)
shush bag	hold-all
shyker / shyckle	wig (mutation of the Yiddish sheitel)
slap	makeup
so	homosexual (e.g. "Is he 'so'?")
stimps	legs
stimpcovers	stockings, hosiery
strides	trousers
strillers	piano
switch	wig
TBH (to be had)	prospective sexual conquest
thews	thighs
tober	road (a Shelta word, Irish bóthar); temporary site for a circus, carnival
todd (Sloan) or tod	from Cockney rhyming slang "alone"
tootsie trade	sex between two passive or feminine homosexuals (as in: 'I don't do tootsie trade')
trade	sex, sex-partner, potential sex-partner
troll	to walk about (esp. looking for trade)
vada / varder	to see (from Italian dialect vardare = guardare – look at)
vera (lynn)	gin
vogue	cigarette (from Lingua Franca fogus – "fire, smoke")
vogueress	female smoker
wallop	dance
willets	breasts
yeute	no, none
yews	(from French "yeux") eyes
zhoosh	style, improve, clothes(cf. Romani zhouzho – "clean, neat")
zhooshy	showy

=== Usage examples ===
Omies and palones of the jury, vada well at the eek of the poor ome who stands before you, his lallies trembling. – taken from "Bona Law", one of the Julian and Sandy sketches from Round The Horne, written by Barry Took and Marty Feldman

Translation: "Men and women of the jury, look well at the face of the poor man who stands before you, his legs trembling."

So bona to vada...oh you! Your lovely eek and your lovely riah. – taken from "Piccadilly Palare", a song by Morrissey

Translation: "So good to see...oh you! Your lovely face and your lovely hair."

As feely ommes...we would zhoosh our riah, powder our eeks, climb into our bona new drag, don our batts and troll off to some bona bijou bar. In the bar we would stand around with our sisters, vada the bona cartes on the butch omme ajax who, if we fluttered our ogle riahs at him sweetly, might just troll over to offer a light for the unlit vogue clenched between our teeth. – taken from Parallel Lives, the memoirs of renowned gay journalist Peter Burton

Translation: "As young men...we would style our hair, powder our faces, climb into our great new clothes, don our shoes and wander/walk off to some great little bar. In the bar we would stand around with our gay companions, look at the great genitals on the butch man nearby who, if we fluttered our eyelashes at him sweetly, might just wander/walk over to offer a light for the unlit cigarette clenched between our teeth."

In the Are You Being Served? episode "The Old Order Changes", Captain Peacock asks Mr Humphries to get "some strides for the omi with the naff riah" (i.e., trousers for the fellow with the unstylish hair).

== See also ==
- African-American Vernacular English (sometimes called Ebonics)
- Bahasa Binan
- Boontling
- Caló (Chicano)
- Carny, a word in North American fairground cant
- Gayle language
- Gay slang
- Grypsera
- IsiNgqumo
- Lavender linguistics
- Lunfardo and Vesre
- Mediterranean Lingua Franca
- Pajubá
- Julian and Sandy
- Rotwelsch
- Shelta
- Swardspeak, argot used by LGBT people in the Philippines
- Verlan
- Lubunca

== Bibliography ==
- Baker, Paul (2002). Fantabulosa: A Dictionary of Polari and Gay Slang. London: Continuum. ISBN 0-8264-5961-7.
- Baker, Paul (2003). Polari: The Lost Language of Gay Men. London: Routledge. ISBN 978-1-134-50635-4.
- Baker, Paul (2019). Fabulosa!: The Story of Polari, Britain's Secret Gay Language. London: Reaktion Books. ISBN 978-1-78914-168-9.
- Elmes, Simon; Rosen, Michael (2002). Word of Mouth. Oxford: Oxford University Press. ISBN 0-19-866263-7.
