= Gayle language =

South African gay slang

Gayle
- Gail
- Region: South Africa: mainly in Johannesburg, Pretoria, Cape Town, Durban, Bloemfontein, and Port Elizabeth
- Native speakers: None; L2 speakers: 20,000
- Language family: based on varying mixtures of English and Afrikaans, with similarity to Polari

Language codes
- ISO 639-3: gic
- Glottolog: gail1235

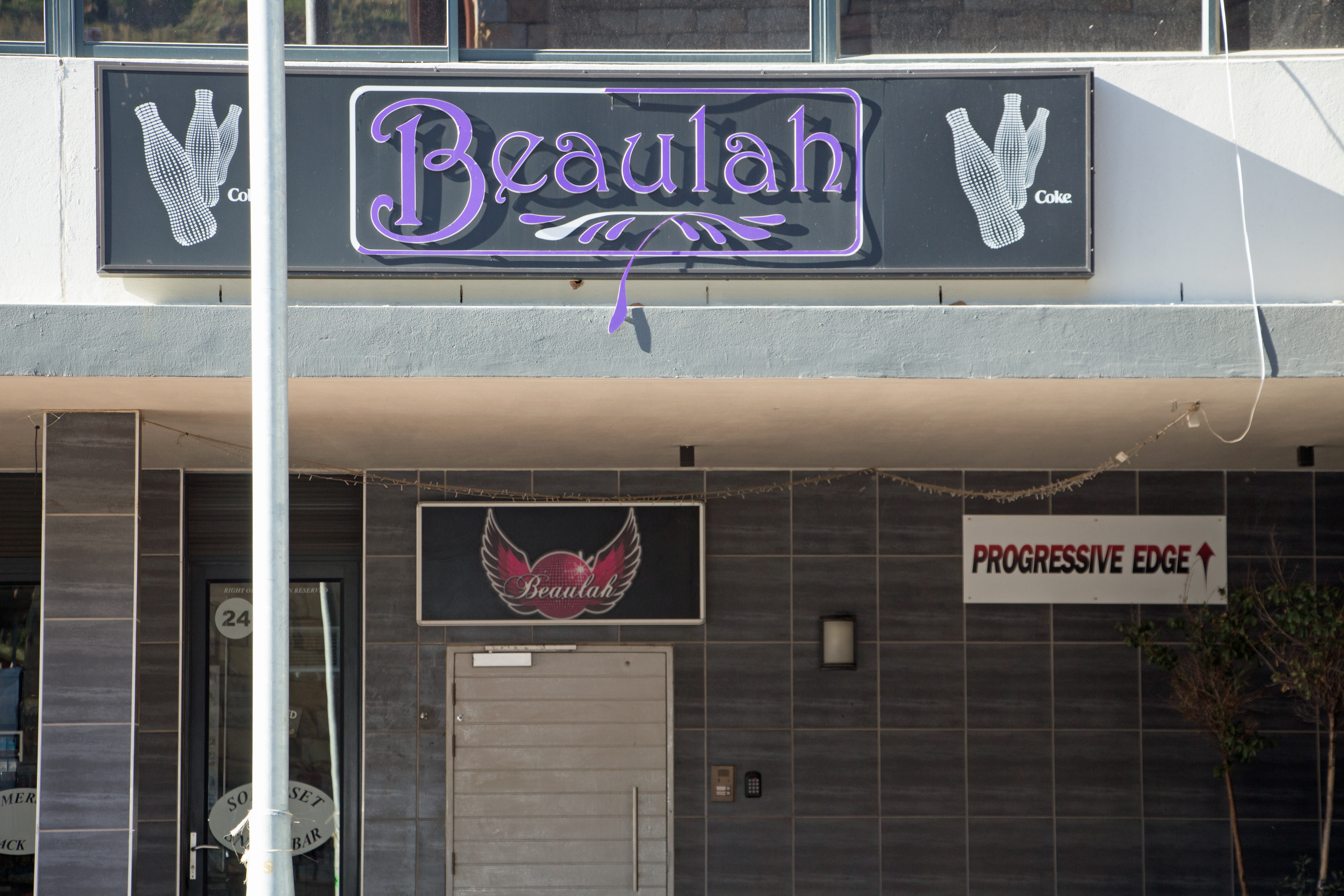
Beaulah Bar in De Waterkant, Cape Town, takes its name from the Gayle word for "beautiful".

Gayle, or Gail, is an English- and Afrikaans-based gay argot or slang used primarily by English and Afrikaans-speaking homosexual men in urban communities of South Africa, and is similar in some respects to Polari in the United Kingdom, from which some lexical items have been borrowed. The equivalent language used by gay South African men who speak Bantu languages is called IsiNgqumo, and is based on a Nguni lexicon.

Gayle originally manifested as moffietaal (Afrikaans: literally, 'homosexual language') in the drag culture of the Cape Coloured community in the 1950s. It permeated into white homosexual circles in the 1960s and became part of mainstream white gay culture.

Besides a few core words borrowed from Polari (such as the word varda meaning 'to see', itself a borrowing from Lingua Franca), most of Gayle's words are alliterative formations using women's names, such as Beulah for 'beauty', Priscilla, meaning 'police', and Hilda for 'hideous'. Men, especially other homosexual men, are often referred to by female pronouns in some circles, as is the custom among many homosexual countercultures throughout the world.

Gayle arose for the same reason that most antilanguages develop, to ensure in-group preference in diverse societies. However it also fulfilled other functions such as to "camp up" conversation, and provide entertainment in a subculture where verbal wit and repartee are highly valued.

A comprehensive study of Gayle was undertaken by linguist Ken Cage in 2002, and his Master's Thesis was published as "Gayle, the language of Kinks and Queens" (2003: Jacana Media). This book, although out of print now, was the first attempt to publish a history of Gayle, as well as a basic dictionary of the argot.

More recently, Gayle has experienced a resurgence and increased popularity following the Showmax series Beaulah: Queens Van die Kaap, a 2024 reality TV show that documents the lives and talents of prominent and upcoming drag queens from the Cape Town drag scene. Gayle has also seen some vitality on TikTok.

== Commonly used terms ==
Gayle term	English translation
Abigail	abortion
Ada	bum, buttocks
Adele	a gay person with a reputation for vindictiveness, dangerous
Agatha	a gossip
Aida or Aunty Aida	HIV / AIDS
Amanda	amazing
Angela	kind, helpful
Belinda	blind
Bella	to bash, to hit, to beat up
Betty Bangles or Jennifer Justice	hand-cuffs, the police
Betty Boems / Knit	sex
Belinia or Beulah	beautiful, gorgeous, handsome
Brenda	to burn
Brunhilda	excessively ugly
Carol	to cry
cha cha palace	discotheque or club
Cheryl	cheerful
Christina	a gay man who attends church
Cilla	cigarette
Cindy	a young person, teenager
Clora	person of mixed race, "coloured"
conch	vagina
Daphne	deaf
Deborah	depressed
Delilah	delightful
Diana	to die
Dora	a drink or in a drunken state
Doreen or Dora de la Poės	drunk
Dorette	small drink
Emma	embarrassing
Erica	erection
Ethel, Ola or Olga	elderly, old
Fatima	fat
Feulah	furious
Gail	to speak
Great Dane	large penis
Griselda	grisly, ugly
handbag (or bag)	guy, boyfriend, male companion, man
Harriet or Wella (after the hair care brand)	hair, hairdo
Hilda	hideous
Iris	irritate
Jella	hurry up
Jessica	jealous or insane
Joan	bitter, gay man
Julia	jewelry
Katrina	bum, buttocks
KFC	sex
Laura	lover
Leonie	liar
Lesley/s	leg/s
Lettie	lesbian
Linda	a lie, to lie
Lizzy	lazy
Lucy	sexually active
Lulu	laugh
lunch	penis, particularly when showing through trousers
Vera or Veronica	to vomit
Mary	a square, straight-laced, nerdish (as in 'Virgin Mary')
Maureen	murder
Mavis, Gertrude or Gertie	very effeminate man
Mara or Mariam	thin
Milly or Mildred	crazy
Mince, Mina or Mina Moo	to walk
Moira	music
Monica (Lewinsky)	mouth
Nancy, or nanny	no
Natalie	African person
Nigel	to have sex (likely from Afrikaans naai or neuk)
Nora	not nice, off, distasteful, naf, ignorant
Olive	attractive man
Patsy	a party
Pearl or Petunia	to urinate
Petula Clark	passed out, unconscious
Persephone	to perspire
Poppy or Aunty Poppie	poppers, amyl nitrate
Priscilla	police
Rachel	rape
Rita	rent boy
Sally (Bob)	fellatio, oral sex
Sheila	(to) shit
Stella	to steal, stolen
Susy / Susan	suicide
Tessa	to tease (your hair)
Tilly	masturbate, give someone a 'hand job'
Trudie	trouble
varda or Carla	to look at
Vera	to vomit
Veronica	voice
Vivian	vibrator
Virginia	virgin
Vis	woman
Wendy	Caucasian person

Varda that Beulah bag! translates to "Look at that beautiful man!"

== See also ==
- Lavender linguistics
