= IsiNgqumo =

Argot used by homosexuals of South Africa and Zimbabwe

IsiNgqumo, or IsiGqumo, (literally "decisions" in the language itself) is an argot used by homosexuals of South Africa and Zimbabwe who speak Bantu languages, as opposed to Gayle, a language used by the homosexuals of South Africa who speak Germanic languages. IsiNgqumo developed during the 1980s. Unlike Gayle, IsiNgqumo has not been thoroughly researched or documented, so figures on numbers of speakers are nonexistent.

IsiNgqumo is often considered a Western invention by indigenous Zimbabweans but it was actually a creation of indigenous homosexuals.

== Sample ==
Although the following sample conversation may be slightly obscene, it is a good representative of IsiNgqumo's use as most of its vocabulary has some connection to sex or gay men.

IsiNgqumo:

"Isiphukwana sake, kuyavuswa na?"
"Maye"
"Injini!"
"Kuncishiwe" (or) "kuyapholwa"

Ndebele translation (to show difference):

"Ubolo sake, kuyakhulu na?"
"Yebo"
"Imbuqo!"
"Kuyancane"

English (literal translation):

"His little stick, has it awoken?"
"Yes"
"Lie!"
"It's not talented" (or) "it makes one cold"

English translation:

"His penis, is it big?"
"Yes"
"Lie!"
"It's small" (both terms mean the same thing, and are very derogatory)

=== Etymology ===
The origin of the vocabulary used in the above sample is given below:

- The word isiphukwana comes from the Ndebele word uphuku (meaning "stick") with the suffix "-ana" (meaning "small"); it is the IsiNgqumo variant of the Ndebele word uphukwana.
- Vuswa is the Nguni word for "woken up" in the passive tense.
- Maye comes from the Zulu word for expressing shock. This is used instead of the Zulu word for yes, yebo.
- Injini literally means "taking on for a ride", and finds its origins in the Zulu word for "engine". In Zulu, the word imbuqo is used for the same purpose.
- The word uncishiwe originates from Zulu as "not given", but is used in IsiNgqumo to mean "not talented". Kuncishiwe has the same meaning as "It is not talented". Uncishiwe can also mean "ugly", or can be used as a generic insult.
- Pholwa is passive tense for the Zulu word for "cool". Kuyapholwa could be translated as "it makes one cool". Like ncishiwe, pholwa can be used as an insult.

== See also ==
- Lavender linguistics
