= The Queens' English =

2021 reference guide for LGBT terms by Chloe O. Davis

The Queens' English: The LGBTQIA+ Dictionary of Lingo and Colloquial Phrases
- Cover of British edition
- Author: Chloe O. Davis
- Language: English
- Genre: Dictionary; Reference work
- Publisher: Clarkson Potter (US); Square Peg (UK)
- Publication date: February 2, 2021; 5 years ago
- Pages: 336
- ISBN: 978-1-529-11040-1
- Dewey Decimal: 306.7603
- Website: thequeensenglishus.com

The Queens' English: The LGBTQIA+ Dictionary of Lingo and Colloquial Phrases is a 2021 reference work written by Chloe O. Davis. The book documents English words and phrases created and used by the LGBT community, as well as their evolution over the years. Davis spent over a decade collecting the information for the book.

== Background ==
Chloe O. Davis had the idea for the book around 2006, a period when she was a member of the Philadelphia Dance Company. Some of the other dancers Davis worked with were into the ballroom culture, and since some of the words they used were not familiar to Davis, she began asking what they meant and defined them in an academic fashion to be able to better understand them.

After discussing with a friend about the possibility of creating a dictionary of those slangs, Davis started to interview people from the LGBT community, collecting words and expressions used by them, as well as their meanings and origins. According to the author, the lack of a resource book about LGBT lingo that was also intersectional was one of the main factors for the creation of The Queens' English.

== Reception ==
Writing for the Library Journal, Stephanie Sendaula noted Davis goes into depth about terms such as "queer", and also gives the origin of words that "originated in ballroom culture—such as fierce, slay, and yas—have been appropriated by the mainstream." Sendaula also praised the stories present in the book. The review's verdict was that the book is "[a] must for better understanding queer culture, especially the contributions of Black and Latino trans people to pop culture at large."

The Queens' English received a starred review from Shelf Awareness, which called it a "delightfully informative, succinct, helpful and playful dictionary". Kevin Howell, who reviewed for the website, also praised the illustrations displayed throughout the book. Paul Gallant, writing for IN Magazine, called the book "a nonjudgmental celebration of the creativity of queer culture."
