= Dykes on Bikes =

Lesbian motorcycle club

- Abbreviation: DOB
- Founded: July 4, 1976
- Founder: Soni Wolf
- Founded at: San Francisco, California, U.S.
- Type: 501(c)(3)
- Purpose: Lesbian motorcycle riders
- Region served: U.S., Canada, Australia, UK, Germany, Iceland
- Members: 22 chapters
- Road Captain/President: Kate Brown
- Website: dykesonbikes.org

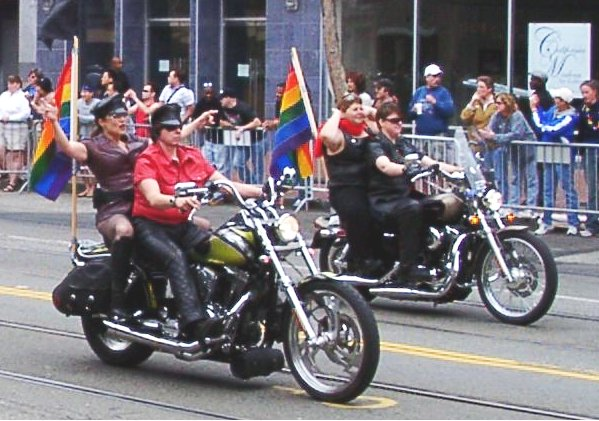
Dykes on Bikes leading the 2005 San Francisco Pride Parade

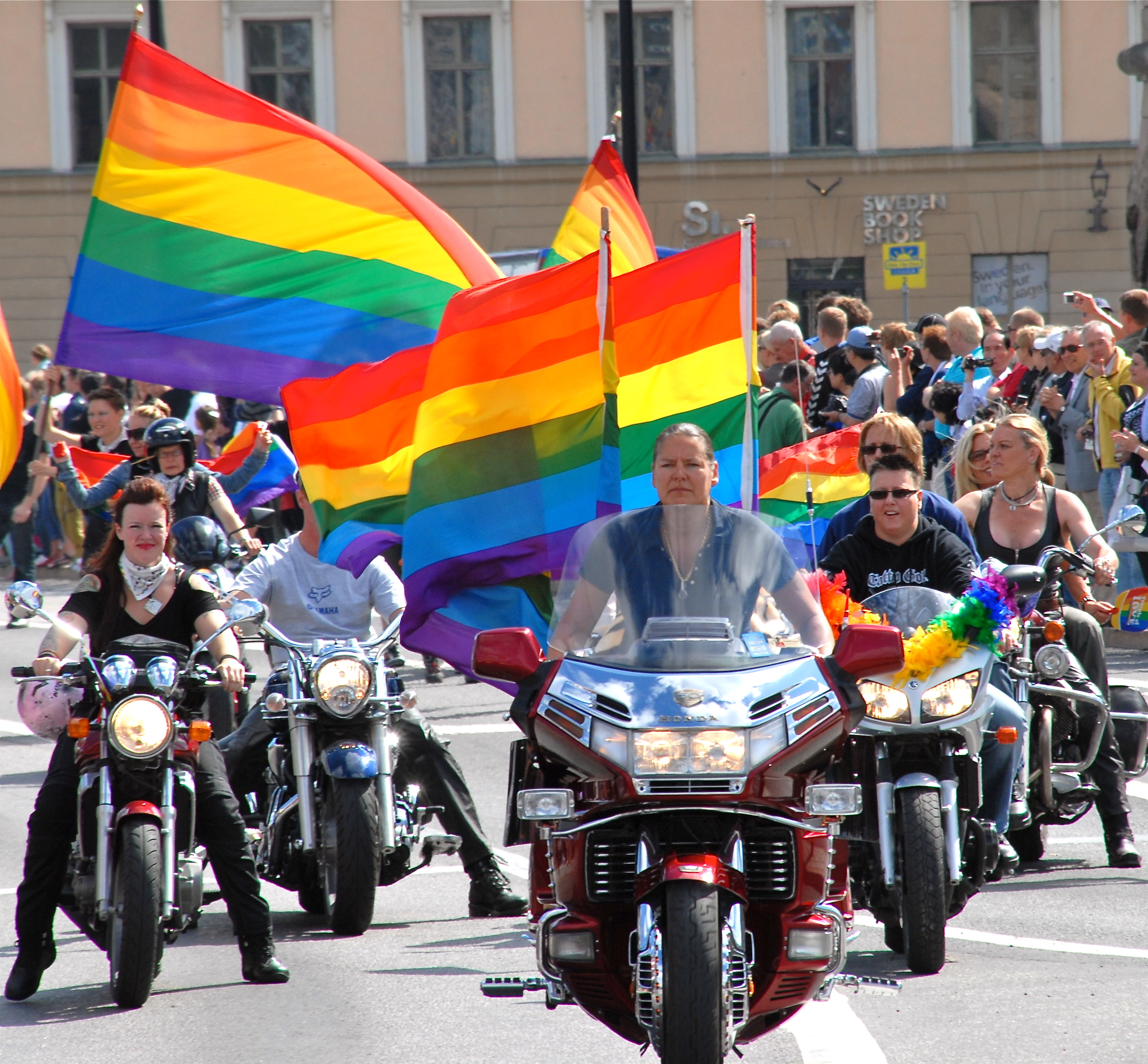
Dykes on Bikes leading the Stockholm Pride parade 2010

Dykes on Bikes (DOB) is a chartered lesbian motorcycle contingent with 22 chapters, numerous affiliations, and 501(c)(3) nonprofit status. They are known for their participation in gay pride events such as pride parades, and significant LGBTQ+ events like the international Gay Games.

The loud bikes and presence remain at the front of the parade for security and logistical reasons, and a celebrated place of honor today as a symbol of LGBTQ pride, defiance, liberation and empowerment. The contingents are fiercely independent and self-reliant in the DIY and feminist traditions and have been studied as a social phenomenon as a "complex, multilayered form of consumption-related cultural resistance that raises awareness of social injustice and discursively informs social meanings in everyday life outside the festivals."

Along with drag queens, the DOB have been criticized for not portraying a more acceptable image of LGBTQ culture. Supporters counter that they are highly visible icons of gay pride who refuse to assimilate and conform to mainstream society gender roles, and are a reminder of the butches and queens who helped lead the Stonewall riots launching the modern gay-rights movement.

The Dykes on Bikes have been criticized for using the term dyke in their name. When registering their name as a trademark in the United States, the group faced a battle to demonstrate that the word dyke, and related terms such as terms diesel-dyke, bull-dyke, and bull-dagger, have in fact been re-appropriated as self-referential terms of endearment and empowerment distinct from lesbian and indeed awards and events utilizing those names are now used by the LGBTQ community. In keeping with the tradition of motorcyclists' rejection of the norms of middle-class, middle-United States, the Dykes on Bikes teach, by example, that women can be masculine and challenge the dominant sexual and cultural expectations of what a woman is and what she can do and achieve.

== History ==
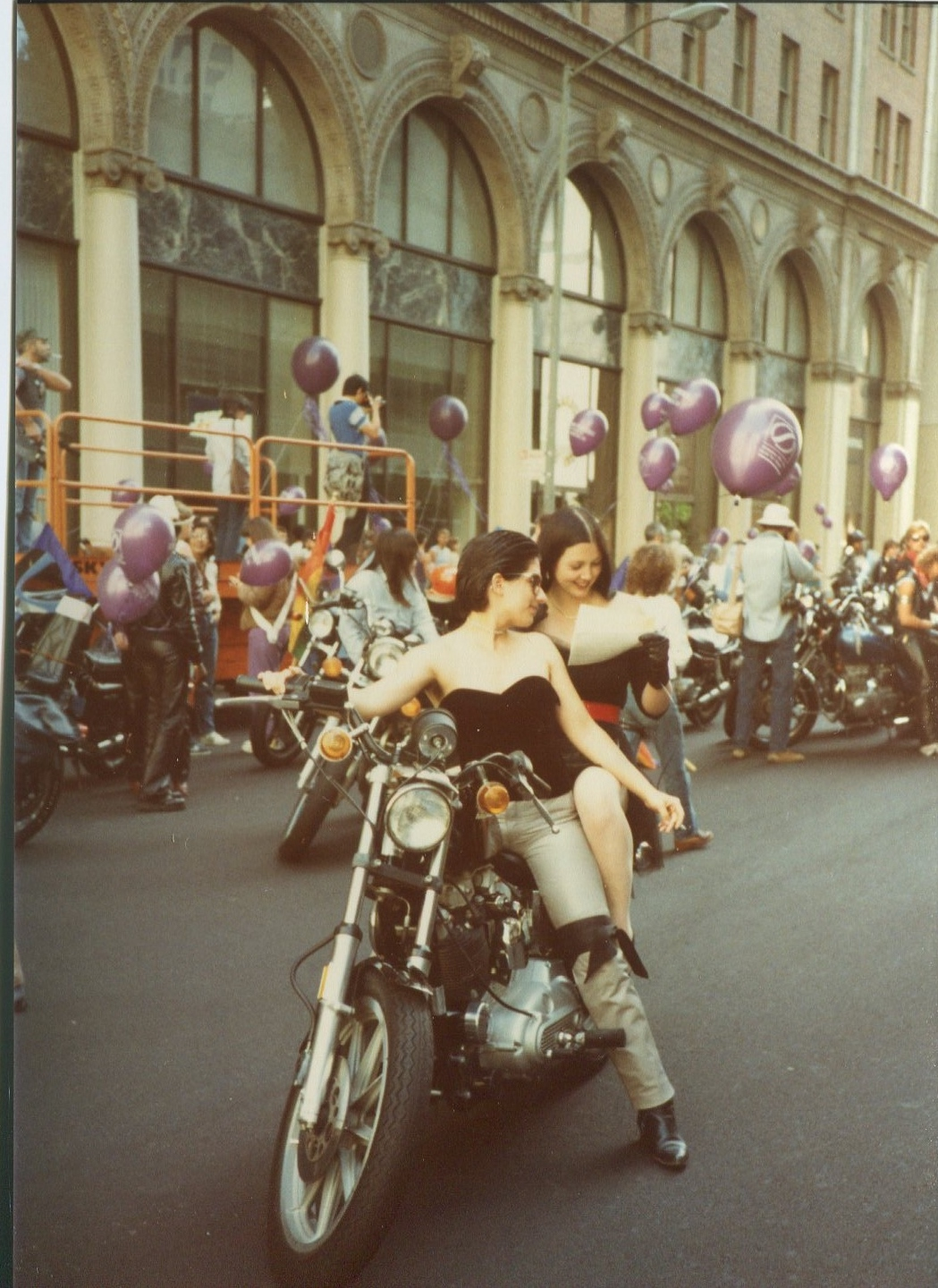
San Francisco Pride Parade in 1983

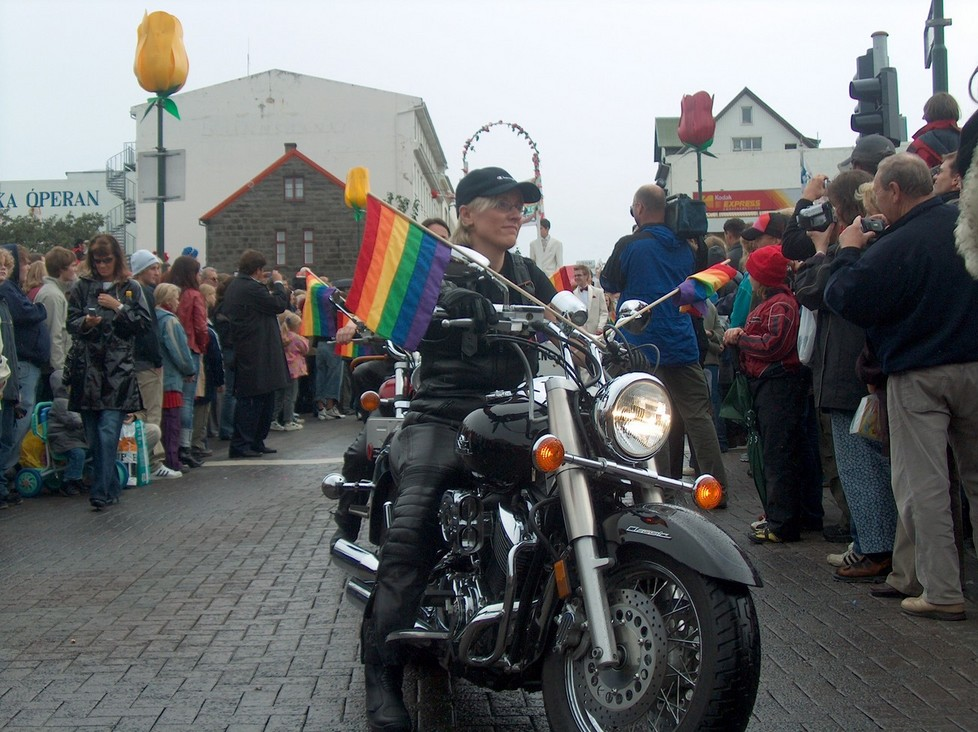
Dykes On Bikes at Reykjavík's 2004 Gay Pride parade in Iceland

The term "Dykes on Bikes" was coined at the first gathering of the 1979 San Francisco Pride parade. The connection between lesbians and motorcycles, however, existed before this official naming. Motorcycles have regularly appeared in lesbian fiction, and the term is sometimes used derogatorily against any woman rider who isn't with a man.

According to Harley-Davidson historians, female riders did everything men did from long distance riding to enjoying lazy Sunday afternoon rides with friends.

=== World War II ===
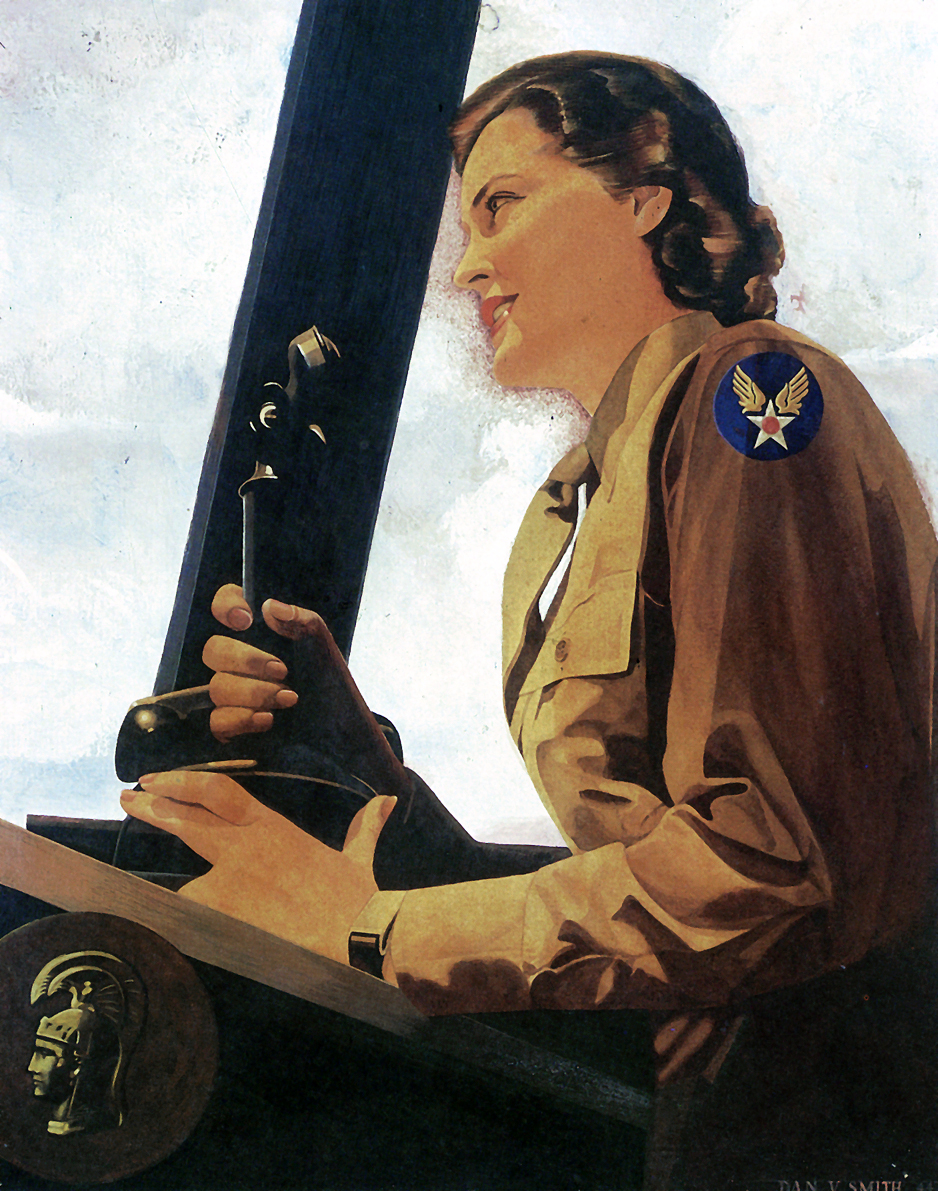
1943 painting of a World War II WAC air controller

As the US entered World War II in 1941, women were provided opportunities to volunteer for their country and almost 250,000 women served in the armed forces, mostly in the Women's Army Corps (WAC), two-thirds of whom were single and under the age of twenty-five. Women were recruited with posters showing muscular, short-haired women wearing tight-fitting tailored uniforms. Bessie Stringfield, a pioneer African-American female motorcyclist, joined a motorcycle dispatch unit of the army.

Many lesbians joined the WAC to meet other women and to do "men's work." Few were rejected for lesbianism, and found that being strong or having masculine appearance – characteristics associated with being dykes – aided in the work as mechanics and motor vehicle operators. A popular Fleischmann's Yeast advertisement showed a WAC riding a motorcycle with the heading "This is no time to be frail." Some recruits appeared at their inductions wearing men's clothing and their hair slicked back in the classic butch style of out lesbians of the time.

=== First appearance ===
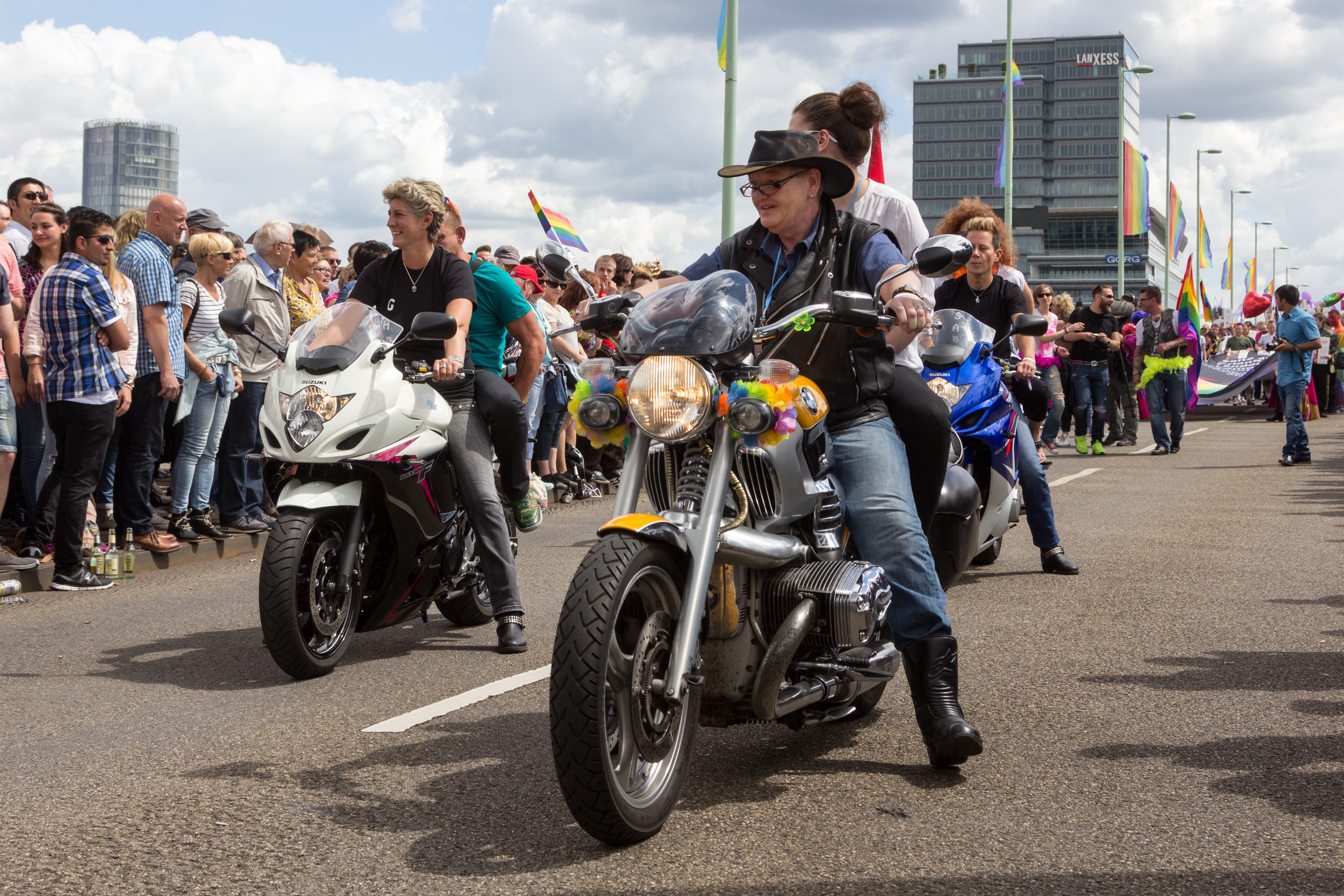
Dykes on Bikes leading the 2016 Cologne Pride

The first formal appearance of the Dykes on Bikes was in 1976 at San Francisco's Pride parade where the riders were placed first as motorcycles didn't always run reliably at the same walking pace as the rest of the parade and, as first contingent, they were able to move faster. Although the original group self-identified as Dykes on Bikes and were known as such, over the years they have used the Women’s Motorcycle Contingent/ Dykes on Bikes to encompass those who identified as gay, lesbian, bisexual, transgender or femme, androgyne, genderqueer, non-binary, gender-fluid and boi.

Founding member Soni Wolf was to be the Community Grand Marshal during the San Francisco Pride parade in 2018. Although Wolf died in April 2018, her close friends represented her in the 2018 parade by carrying the custom-painted motorcycle tank from the bike she rode during the inaugural ride in 1976.

== Worldwide phenomena ==
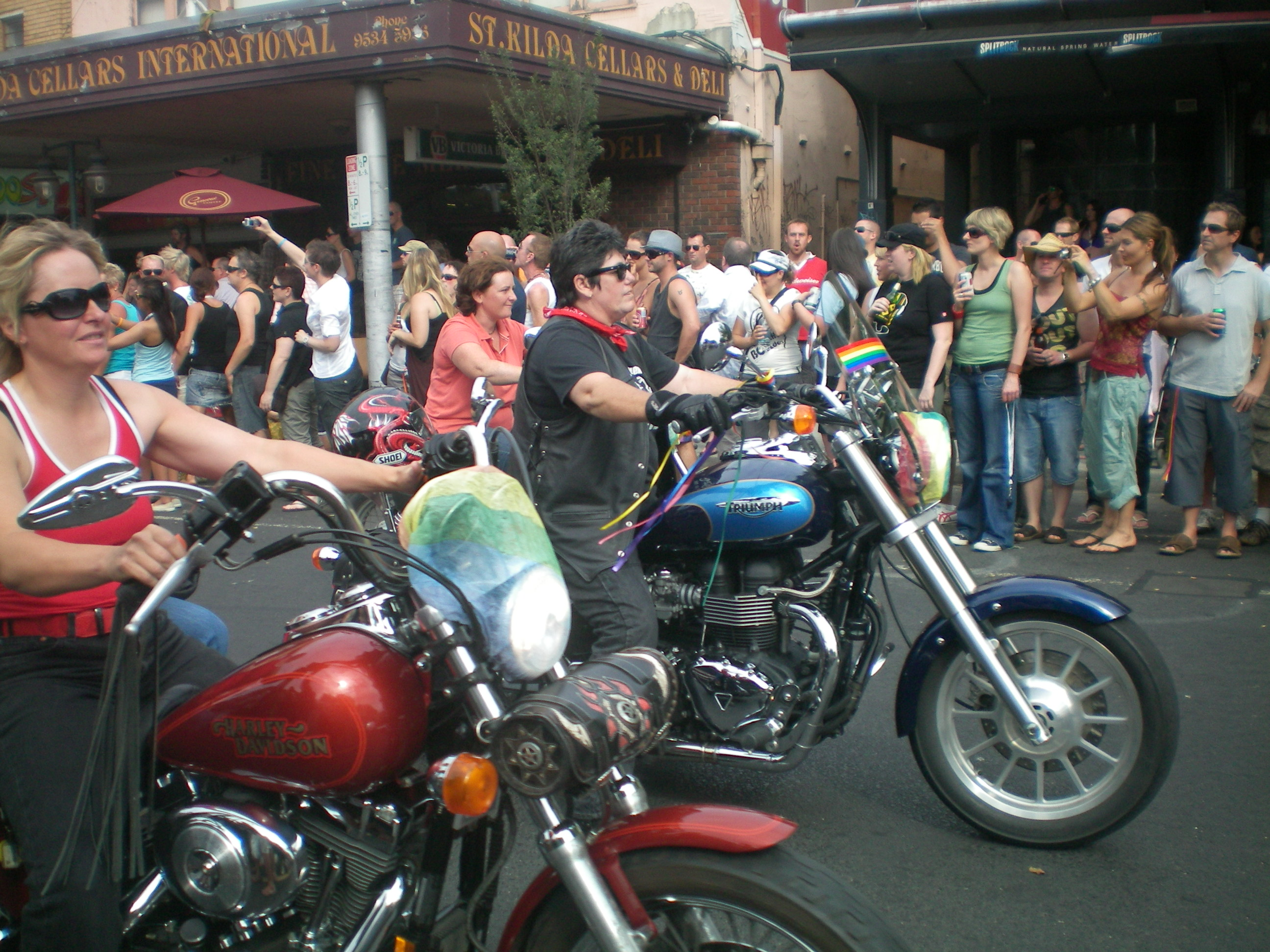
At the 2009 Midsumma Festival

Dykes on Bikes have been leading marches such as Gay pride parades, Gay Games events, and protests since their creation in 1976. "Dyke Marches" have become a popular Pride event nationwide, with the Dykes on Bikes often leading the marches. The Dyke March events are generally non-commercial, often in sharp contrast to corporate-sponsored pride events, and are usually inclusive of lesbian, bi, and trans women. Contingents of the DOB have led pride parades around the world from San Francisco to Melbourne, Paris, London, Tokyo, Toronto, Vancouver, Winnipeg, Sydney, Zurich, Tel Aviv, and Greece.

== Legal battle to register DOB as a trademark ==
Normally the United States Patent and Trademark Office (PTO), under Section 2(a) of the Lanham Act, will not consider registration of a proposed trademark which contains a term that is disparaging to a group of people. This presents a problem for the PTO when an attempt is made by a group to register a mark containing a self-disparaging term, as was done with DOB. "On February 20, 2004, the PTO refused the registration of the mark 'Dykes on Bikes' under Trademark Act Section 2(a), explaining that a reasonable person of ordinary sensibilities would recognize that the term “dyke” is disparaging and objectionable to lesbian, gay, bisexual and transgender communities."

On November 13, 2006, the Dykes on Bikes won the battle to trademark the name, having struggled since 2003 to persuade the PTO that "dyke" was not offensive to the lesbian community. In 2005, after a prolonged court battle involving testimony on the word's changing role in the lesbian community, the Trademark Trial and Appeal Board permitted the group to register its name.

The defense noted that during the time period from 2000 to 2005 the PTO had approved marks for "Crippled Old Biker Bastards", "Biker Bitch", "Whore", and "Evil Pussy" as well as "TechnoDyke", "Homo Depot", "Queer Shop", Queer Eye for the Straight Guy and Queer as Folk. The Brooke Oliver Law Office that represented the SFWMC also pointed out the absurdity of the initial rejection ruling citing the PTO's own regulations that "the perceptions of the general public are irrelevant" and indeed the test of "whether a mark is disparaging and/or offensive is the perceptions of the individuals referred to and/or identified by that mark. In this particular case, it is women – or more specifically lesbians, bisexuals and transgender women – who ride motorcycles in the Pride Parades and who would be using the term."

In 2007, after the USPTO granted approval, the group faced a new challenge from a male lawyer, Michael McDermott. McDermott sued the group, calling the name "disparaging to men" and "scandalous and immoral." McDermott stated his opposition against any group associated with the annual Dyke March, which he dubbed "the Annual Illegal San Francisco Dyke Hate Riot" in which he and all men are subject to criminal attacks and civil right violations. He claimed the word dyke is associated with a "deep obsessive hatred of men and the male gender." The court found that men had no grounds to be offended by the term.

== In popular culture ==
In June 2014, the San Francisco Dykes on Bikes Women's Motorcycle Contingent was filmed for an episode of Sense8 during Dyke March.

Women from Dykes on Bikes feature briefly as characters in the 2018 film The Mule, where they have a passing encounter with director Clint Eastwood's character.

== See also ==
- LGBT slang
- History of lesbianism in the United States
- Queer
