= Soni Wolf =

American queer activist

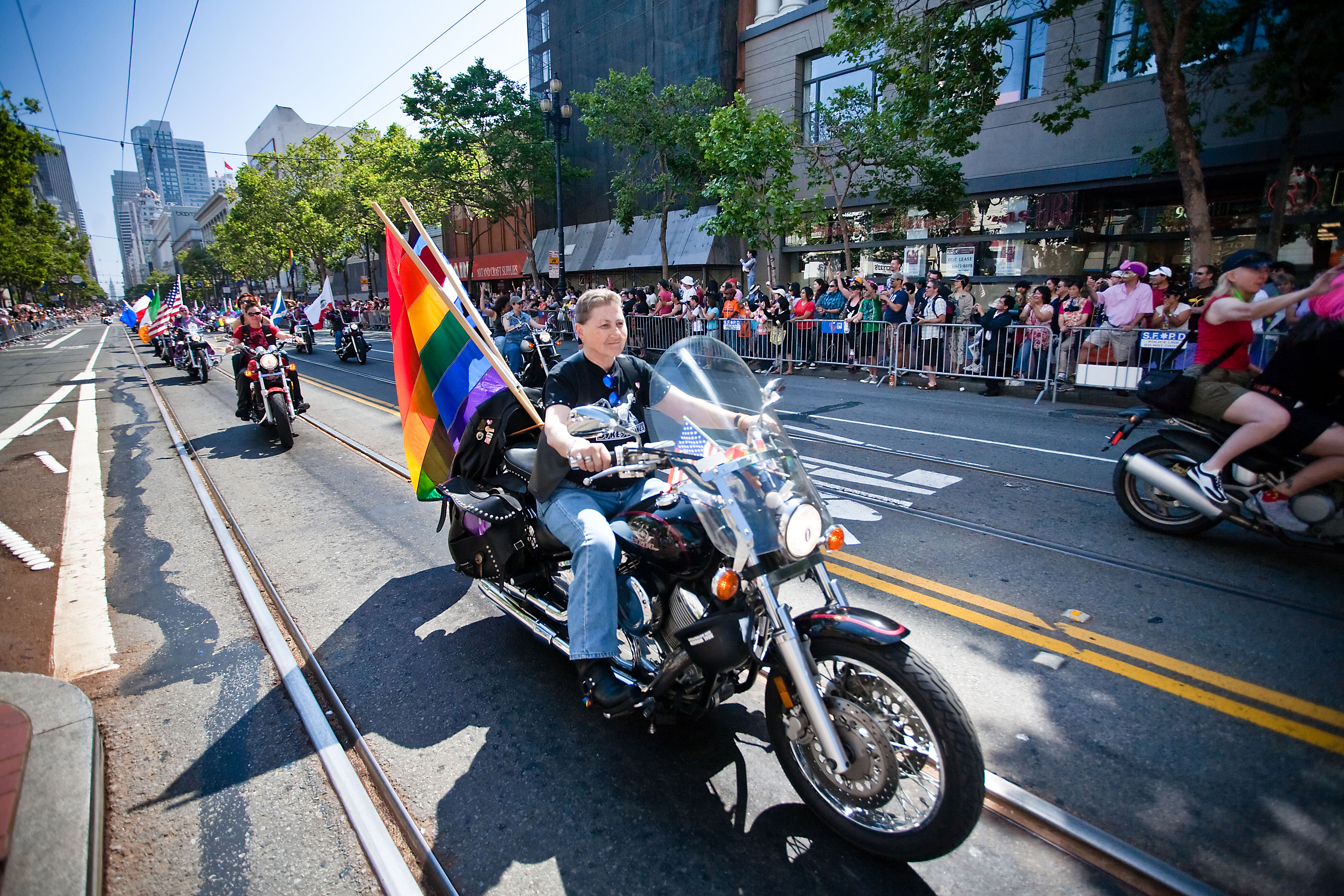
- Wolf at the 2009 San Francisco Pride parade
- Born: September 19, 1948
- Died: April 25, 2018 (aged 69); Daly City, California, U.S.
- Known for: Lesbian activism
- Military career
- Allegiance: United States of America
- Branch: United States Air Force
- Service years: Vietnam War

Soni S.H.S. Wolf (September 19, 1948 – April 25, 2018) was an American lesbian activist. She described herself as a dyke, and was also a motorcycle enthusiast and former U.S. Air Force Vietnam-era veteran. She co-founded the Dykes on Bikes (DOB) after their 1976 San Francisco Pride parade debut, and rode with them each year from 1978 until her death in 2018. The group is a highly visible symbol of empowerment and LGBTQ pride. Wolf nurtured DOB's worldwide chapters and fought for their right to use the reclaimed term dyke, they fought and won two lawsuits against the U.S. Patent and Trademark Office so they could trademark their name and logo. DOB does “philanthropic work for LGBTQ causes and organizations around the world”. In June 2019, to coincide with the 50th anniversary of the Stonewall riots, Wolf was one of fifty inaugural heroes to be named on the National LGBTQ Wall of Honor placed inside the Stonewall Inn, and within the Stonewall National Monument.

== Early life through 1970s ==
Soni S.H.S. Wolf grew up in Rhode Island.

She joined the United States Air Force during the Vietnam War. During her time in service, she was a medic at a hospital in Texas treating wounded combat veterans. She never revealed what S.H.S. stood for, nor did she speak of her time treating wounded soldiers returning from the Vietnam War as she was too traumatized by the treatment of Vietnam vets to do so. The brutal war, which lasted from 1964 to 1973, was the first major time veterans returned not as a unit but individually, without parades celebrating victory as it was “the first major lost war abroad in American history”. It was also divisive with protests against it, and a growing opposition to United States involvement, with the public often projecting their hostility onto the vets.

After her discharge she moved to San Francisco, she adopted her name Soni S.H.S. Wolf while in the military, it was used to identify her on her discharge papers. She moved to San Francisco, California, into the city's gay district, The Castro, and became a manager of photocopier centers for Charles Schwab Corporation, and other brokerages and law firms.

== Dykes on Bikes ==
In June 1976, a group of 20-25 lesbians decided to ride their motorcycles in the San Francisco Gay Freedom Day Parade which had started in 1970. They led the parade to prevent their bikes from overheating due to idling behind the slower-moving walking contingents. Some motorcyclists had done the parade before then, but it wasn't as organized. One of the riders noted them as being “dykes on bikes” which was overheard, and reported in the city's main newspaper, the San Francisco Chronicle. The Dykes on Bikes (DOB) formalized within a week of the parade. Although the name originator isn't known, Wolf, who started riding with the group in 1978, is for embracing the name, and helping the new group helping leverage it to become one of the most visible, and empowering symbols of LGBTQ communities.

Brook Oliver, lead attorney in DOB's effort to trademark, said,

“Soni was the founding mother of Dykes on Bikes,” and added “She was the inspiration and the mentor that allowed Dykes on Bikes to flourish all over the world.”

In the first decade of riding in the pride parade the participants would just gather at the event and ride. In the mid-1980s the DOB participants had to get more organized, the parade now requires preregistration and proof of insurance for all vehicles.

Wolf continued working with the group to organize into a 501(c)(3) non-profit. She also served on the board of San Francisco Pride. DOB grew larger than San Francisco, with sixteen chapters and thousands of members in the U.S., Britain and Australia. Wolf was alarmed when a Wisconsin woman wanted to monetize the group's name for a line of clothing, she noted dyke had been used to disparage lesbians for years, and vowed to take it back.

=== Trademark challenges ===
Wolf, as primary witness, led the DOB fight to register the groups’ name, and later, its logo. The first case went to the Supreme Court and took five years from 2003 to 2008. The legal battle began after DOB filed a trademark application in 2003. Wolf refused to accept dyke as an insult, and she insisted on treating all people with respect and dignity. Twenty-four expert witnesses provided evidence that DOB had reclaimed dyke for the lesbian community, and the term was used to empower. The United States Patent and Trademark Office (PTO) denied the trademark application twice under Section 2(a) of the Lanham Act, which does not allow consideration of trademark that could be considering disparaging to a group of people. The PTO said dyke is vulgar, offensive, "scandalous", and, according to Webster's dictionary, is "often used disparagingly". The attorney with the PTO decided dyke would be offensive to a significant portion of the lesbian community. In July 2007 the Supreme “declined to hear the case, rendering a decision in favor of protecting the name Dykes on Bikes in the court of appeals binding”. The Trademark Trial and Appeal Board allowed the group to register its name.

In 2008, Wolf became central again in a second round of legal battles when DOB went to the same agency, the PTO to register the groups’ logo, which unsurprisingly includes the name of the group, Dykes on Bikes. The PTO, the same agency that had first denied then accepted the name application years earlier, now denied the logo application for the same reason it had previously refused the first name registration. This time “the Supreme Count heard oral arguments” for the case, ruling in favor of the DOB in January 2018. The same defense to allow historically oppressed minorities to use re-appropriated slurs was presented in an amicus brief to a 2017 Supreme Court case, Matal v. Tam, which decided 8–0 in favor of striking the law that PTO used against the DOB.

Wolf served as the DOB historian and secretary for many years, and in 2016 she was made Secretary Emeritus. In July 2017 she stepped back from administrative duties.

She died at age 69 from complications of pulmonary disease and pneumonia at Seton Medical Center in Daly City, California.

The Soni Wolf Memorial Fund was set up through the DOB to cover the expenses of cataloging and archiving Wolf's extensive collection covering the groups’ existence. As of June 2019, a GoFundMe page has raised over $3,000 of a $5,000 goal.

== Honors ==
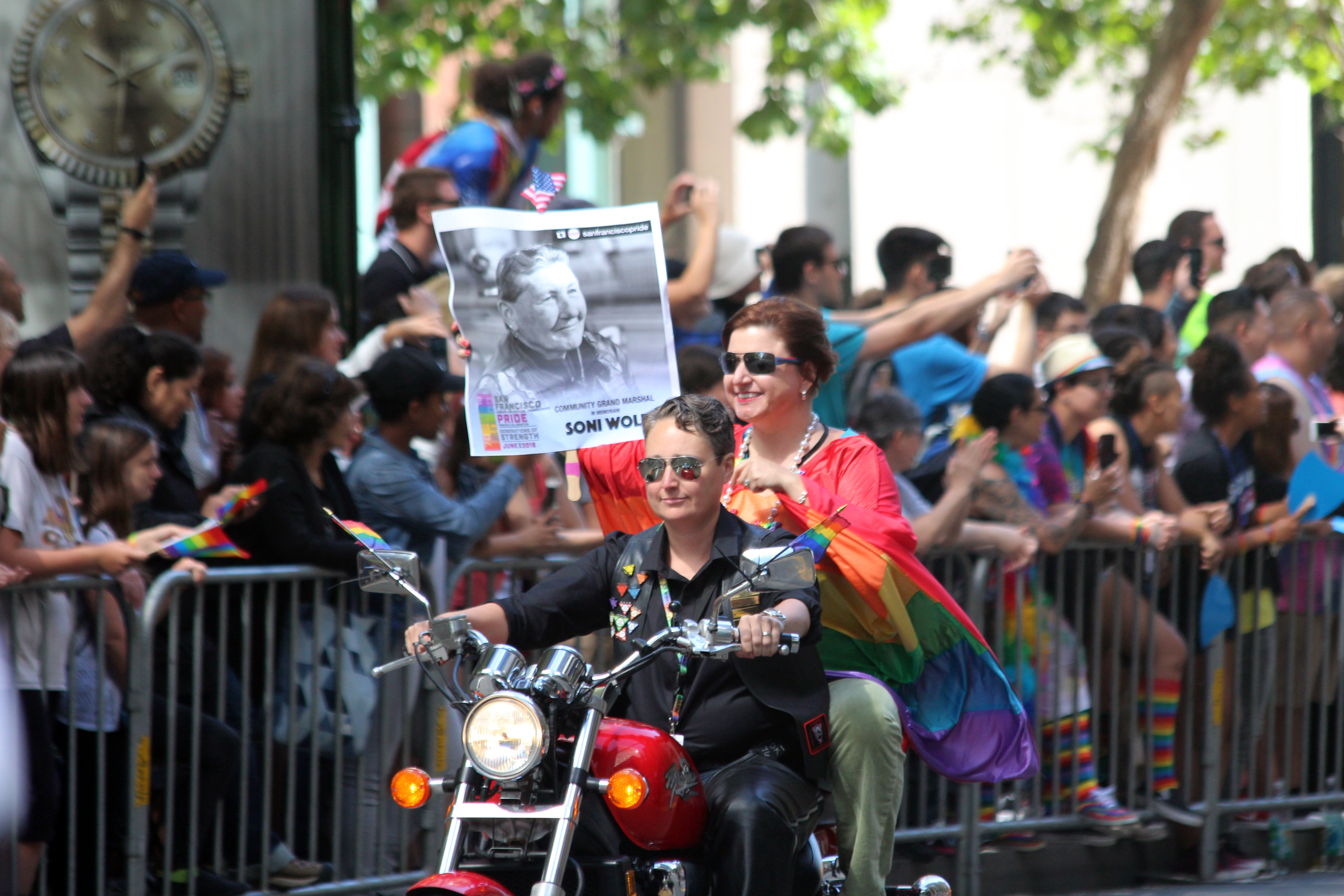
Fellow Dykes on Bikes carrying a sign in the 2018 San Francisco Pride parade in honor of Soni Wolf

In 2016 she was sainted by the Sisters of Perpetual Indulgence as someone who “dedicated their life to fundraising, activism, and human rights”.

In June 2018, Wolf was to serve as grand marshal of San Francisco Pride events, she died two months before the event. Her close friends represented her in the parade by carrying the custom-painted motorcycle tank from the bike she rode during her first ride in 1978. Other riders put signs on their motorcycles or held up signs in their hands in her honor.

In June 2019, Wolf was one of the inaugural fifty American “pioneers, trailblazers, and heroes” inducted on the National LGBTQ Wall of Honor within the Stonewall National Monument (SNM) in New York City’s Stonewall Inn. The SNM is the first U.S. national monument dedicated to LGBTQ rights and history, while The Wall's unveiling was timed to take place during the 50th anniversary of the Stonewall riots.

== See also ==
- National Vietnam War Veterans Day (March 29)
