= Queen (slang) =

Gay slang

In gay slang, queen was originally a term used to refer to a flamboyant or effeminate gay man. The term can either be pejorative or celebrated as a type of self-identification. Queen has seen an evolution where more modernly its usage suggests empowerment or affection.

Given its evolution, the meaning of queen is versatile and context-dependent, ranging from an insult (from its historical roots) such as suggestive of appearing or behaving effeminately or excessively to more modernly often being used to suggest empowerment or affection.

== History ==
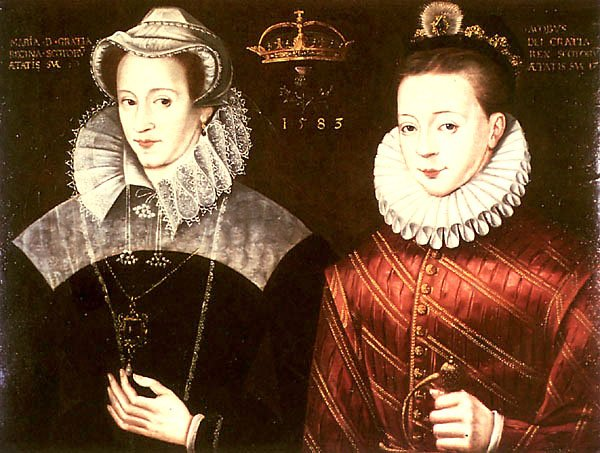
James Stuart (right) with his mother Mary Queen of Scots, later 'Queen' James I

When James I of England ascended the English throne in 1603, an epigram circulated in London: "Elizabeth was King: now James is Queen." This pasquinade was noted by the Italian historian Gregorio Leti. However, its current common usage is derived from Cockney rhyming slang of "Queen Mary", based on Mary of Teck, who married the future King George V in 1893, as this rhymes with "fairy", the original term for a gay man. In 1951, Karl Bowman, former president of the American Psychiatric Association, described patients who were called queens, in a report to the California State Legislature:

I have records of two males, both of whom have asked for complete castration, including amputation of the penis, construction of an artificial vagina, and the administration of female sex hormones. [...] Male homosexuals of this type are called "Queens" and seem to differ markedly from the main group of homosexuals who are more nearly like the average man.

Such individuals in the 20th century would later be commonly termed transsexuals.

Thus in the early to mid-20th century, queen was a derogatory term to mean gay men who appeared or acted effeminately. It has still seen modern use to mock or belittle queer men, as the evolution of language and contextual usage is complex. Terms such as “queen” or “queer” can still contextually be used to convey original insulting intent.

In the late 20^{th} century to early 21^{st} century, queen became more commonly used in queer community vocabulary. For instance, gay and bi men would use it commonly when talking to each other. Terms such as drag queen and its variants in Related Terms became more common in conjunction with drag culture. During this time, the term seemed to be reclaimed and more often used in the queer community and to refer to identity in a non-derogatory way. Though there was still some usage of the term to refer to someone who behaved dramatically or excessively (called “extra” in slang).

Once mostly associated with drag culture (circa late 20^{th} century to early 21^{st} century), queen has additionally found broader usage in pop-culture slang such as casually calling someone queen (paralleling the use of “king”), which can be empowering or slightly catty, and expressions such as “slay queen” and “yas queen” which suggest empowerment, solidarity, or approval (overall, praise or a compliment).

== Related terms ==
=== Drag queen ===
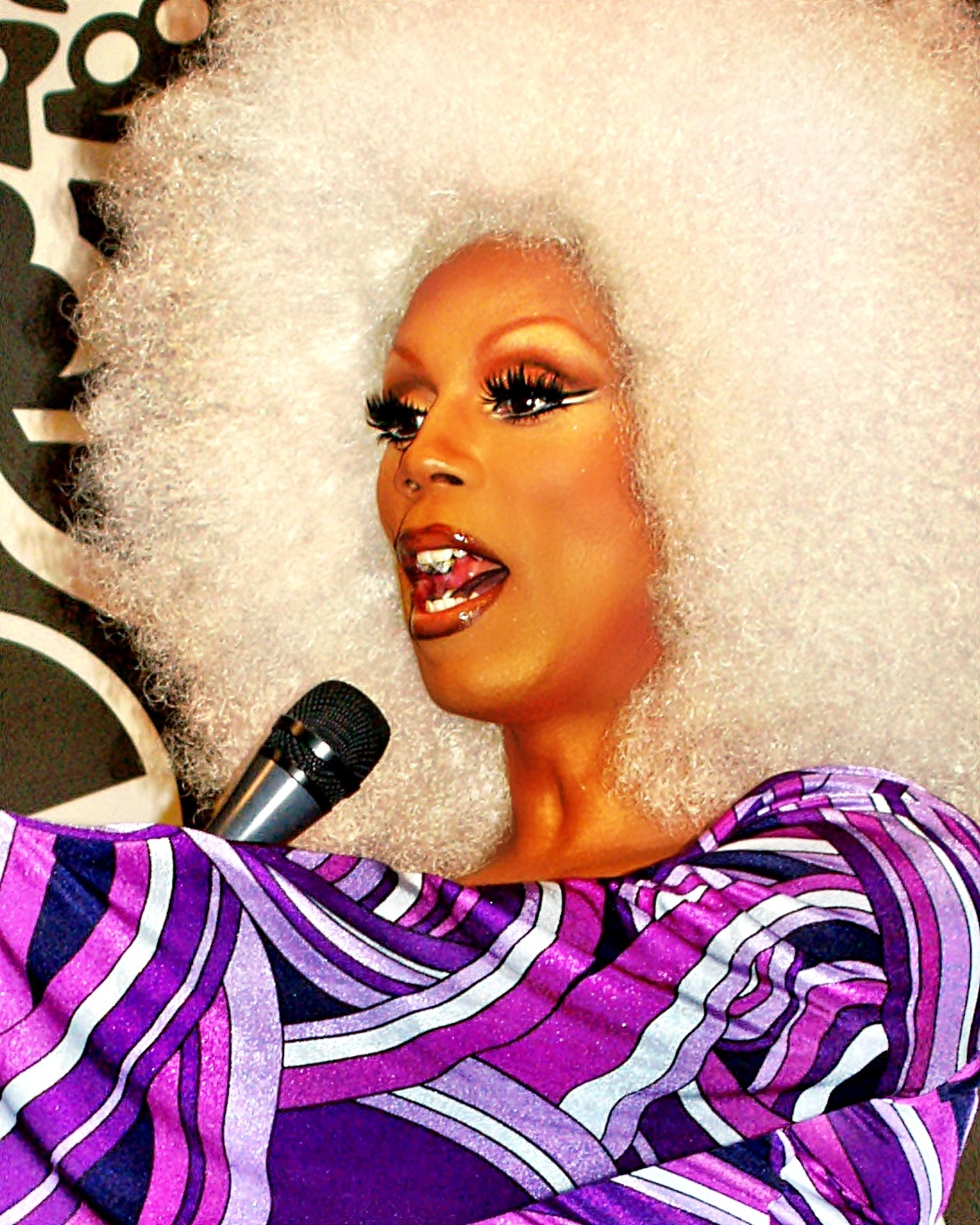
RuPaul, arguably the world's most famous drag queen, is known for the series RuPaul's Drag Race, its international spin-offs, and related DragCons.

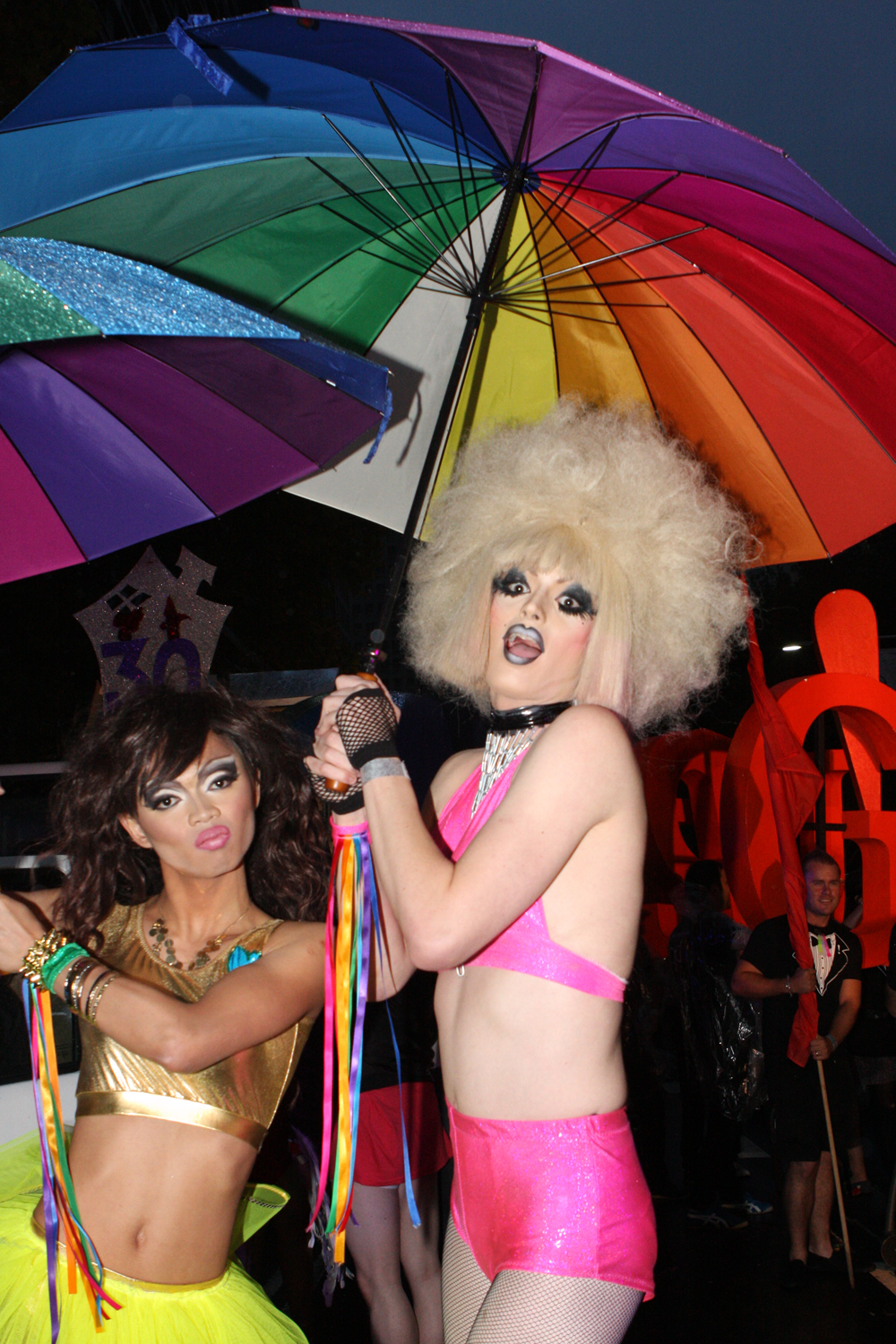
Drag queens at 2012 Sydney Mardi Gras

A drag queen is a person, usually male, who uses drag clothing and makeup to imitate and often exaggerate female gender signifiers and gender roles for entertainment purposes. Historically, most drag queens have been men dressing as women. In modern times, drag queens are associated with gay men and gay culture, but they can be of any gender and sexual identity.

People partake in the activity of doing drag for reasons ranging from self-expression to mainstream performance or to simply have fun. Drag shows frequently include lip-syncing, live singing, and dancing. They occur at events like gay pride parades and drag pageants and in venues such as cabarets and nightclubs. Drag queens vary by type, culture, and dedication, from professionals who star in films to people who do drag only occasionally.

Generally, drag queens dress in a female gender role, often exaggerating certain characteristics for comic, dramatic or satirical effect. Other drag performers include drag kings, who are women who perform in male roles, faux queens, who are women who dress in an exaggerated style to emulate drag queens and faux kings, who are men who dress to impersonate drag kings. A bedroom queen is a drag queen who mainly does their drag at home in the bedroom rather than publicly.

The term drag queen usually refers to people who dress in drag for the purpose of performing, whether singing or lip-synching, dancing, participating in events such as gay pride parades, drag pageants, or at venues such as cabarets and discotheques. Alongside traditional drag work such as shows and performances, many drag queens engage in 'mix-and-mingle' or hosting work at night clubs or at private parties/events. Drag is a part of Western gay culture; it is often noted that the Stonewall riots on June 27, 1969 in New York City were inspired and led by drag queens and, in part for this reason, drag queens remain a tradition at pride events. Prominent drag queens in the gay community of a city often serve as official or unofficial spokespersons, hosts or emcees, fund-raisers, chroniclers and community leaders.

=== Rice queen ===
A rice queen is a gay male, usually white, who prefers or exclusively dates East Asian men. The term is considered gay slang and, depending on the context, may be considered derogatory and offensive internationally.

Sticky rice refers to East Asian men who prefer other East Asian men, likewise to the term rice king, which is used to describe males who seek Asian women.

Yellow fever denotes the attraction certain non-Asian individuals may have for Asian men or women.

=== Bean queen ===
Bean queen or rice and bean queen are terms used in the English-speaking gay community to refer to a gay male, usually white, who is primarily attracted to Hispanic and Latino males. One source describes these as "Gay men who are attracted to gentlemen of the Latino flava."

The term is probably derived from the better-established term "rice queen", substituting the rice that forms the basis of the Asian diet with the beans or rice and beans popular throughout Central America, South America and the Caribbean. Other food-based variations such as taco queen, salsa queen and so on are heard occasionally.

Refried beans refers to Hispanic and Latino men who prefer other Hispanic and Latino men.

Much less frequently, these terms are used to describe gay Latino males themselves.

=== Mitten queen ===
One who prefers to masturbate partners.

=== Fire queen ===
One who likes to burn partners with cigarettes and/or vice versa.

=== Size queen ===
A size queen is a gay or bisexual male who prefers, or exclusively dates or has sex with men who have large penises.

=== Gym queen ===
Gym queen refers to gay men who are into bodybuilding and working out either to bulk up and may include steroid use or those looking for a more lithe physique. Although body building and male physique magazines were popular before the 1970s, the Castro clone look — workboots, jeans, tight white T-shirt, shorter well-kept hair, and a well-muscled physique — became widely known and emulated in the 1970s and 1980s, replacing the hippie artistic constructs and fashions.

=== Show queen ===
According to Charles Isherwood in The New York Times, "Show queen is, of course, the technical term for a person, of either gender and any sexual orientation, who is inordinately fond of Broadway musicals." Although a "reviled" gay stereotype in the past, many LGBT activists influenced by queer politics have sought to reclaim the stereotype in a positive way.

== In literature ==
An early example of this usage of the word "queen" in modern mainstream literature occurs in the 1933 novel The Young and the Evil by Charles Henri Ford and Parker Tyler: "While waiting Karel wet his hair and put his handkerchief smeared with mascara behind a pipe. You still look like a queen Frederick said..."

== In music ==
"Artificial Energy", the opening track from The Byrds' 1968 album The Notorious Byrd Brothers is an upbeat song about the effects of amphetamine use, but the lyrics take an unexpected dark turn at the end when the narrator reveals that he's landed "in jail 'cause [he] killed a queen."

The Pink Floyd song from 1979 album The Wall, "Waiting for the Worms", contains the line "Waiting, for the queens and the coons and the reds and the Jews". The Kinks song from 1970, "Top of the Pops", contains the line "I've been invited to a dinner with a prominent queen..." and may be one of the earliest recorded examples of this usage. Their 1966 song "Little Miss Queen of Darkness" may be an even earlier reference, though more ambiguous in its possible description of a drag queen "accidentally met" in a discotheque, whose "false eyelashes/ were not much of a disguise..." and who was "not all that it might seem..."

The name of famous British rock group, Queen, can be seen as a reference to LGBT slang. According to singer Freddie Mercury, he "was certainly aware of the gay connotations" when suggesting the name, although, as he admitted, "that was just one facet of it".

Ben Platt's song All American Queen is centered around a "queen", and is a celebration of "a super-queer, effeminate, young kid growing up in the middle of America — the idea of that being such an inherent part of the tapestry of being an American and how that makes you, if anything, more American. Certainly no less. That was really fun and exciting and not something I’d heard expressed. I love the idea of giving that kind of a kid an anthem and allowing him to sort of embrace a sort of patriotism, but turned on its head in a super-gay way."

== See also ==
- LGBT slang
