= Bebe Sweetbriar =

American drag performer

BeBe Sweetbriar
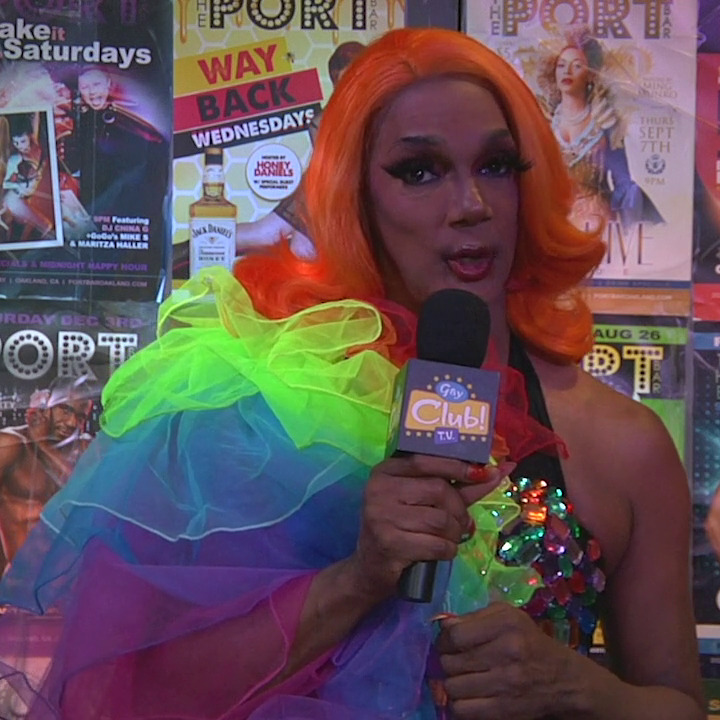
- Bebe Sweetbriar in 2020
- Born: Kevin-Lee Junious; April 8, 1962 (age 64); California, U.S.
- Occupations: Singer, Actor, Activist
- Website: BeBeSweetbriar.com

BeBe Sweetbriar is the stage name of Kevin-Lee Junious, an American drag singer, actor, community activist, and host based in San Francisco, California. She has released two dance records, Save Me and Free to Be Me. BeBe is also host of multiple parties, such as Porno, a quarterly dance party and Play Trivia with BeBe at Harveys, San Francisco. She hosts a weekly webTV talk show, It's Everything, on the Talk Stream Network.

== Life and career ==
BeBe Sweetbriar was born and raised in Sacramento, California by Joan and Ace Junious. His given name is Kevin-Lee Junious. He is the youngest of four siblings, two sisters and one brother. He has two daughters, Alessandra and Cydney. BeBe started performing at age 5. He learned how to play the trumpet, trombone, and baritone horn.

She stepped away from music and performing until 2006. This is the year Kevin-Lee created BeBe Sweetbriar, his drag persona.

On May 18, 2013, San Francisco Pride selected Bebe as the parade's Community Grand Marshal over Bradley Manning.

BeBe's collaboration with Knife & Fork and Leo Frappier, "UNITY," spent 9 weeks on Billboard's Dance Club Songs chart peaking at position 25 on October 21, 2017.

== Activism ==
BeBe has performed for various fundraisers to benefit many LGBT organizations including AIDS Housing Alliance, Under One Roof, Larkin Street Youth, Lyric, GLAAD, Richmond/Ermet AIDS Foundation.

== Discography ==
- "UNITY" (2017)
- Come Play With Me (Ode to Grace Jones) (2013)
- Here We Go (2012)
- Show It Off (2012)
- Stand Up (2012)
- Save Me (2006)
- Free to Be Me (2006)

== Filmography ==
List of theatre, television and film credits
Film
Year	Title	Role	Notes
2009	Under One Sun	Regina	
2009	Devious, Inc.	Lateck's Twin/Lola	
2014	Eternal		Post-production
Television
2020	Hiraeth	Jazz	

== Awards and honors ==
- 2008, Miss Gay San Francisco
- 2008, Miss Desperate Diva
- 2013, Community Grand Marshal, San Francisco Pride Parade
- 2017, Most Notable Drag Queen, The San Francisco Nightlife Awards (a.k.a. The Nitey Awards)
