= Dyke (slang) =

Lesbian slang term

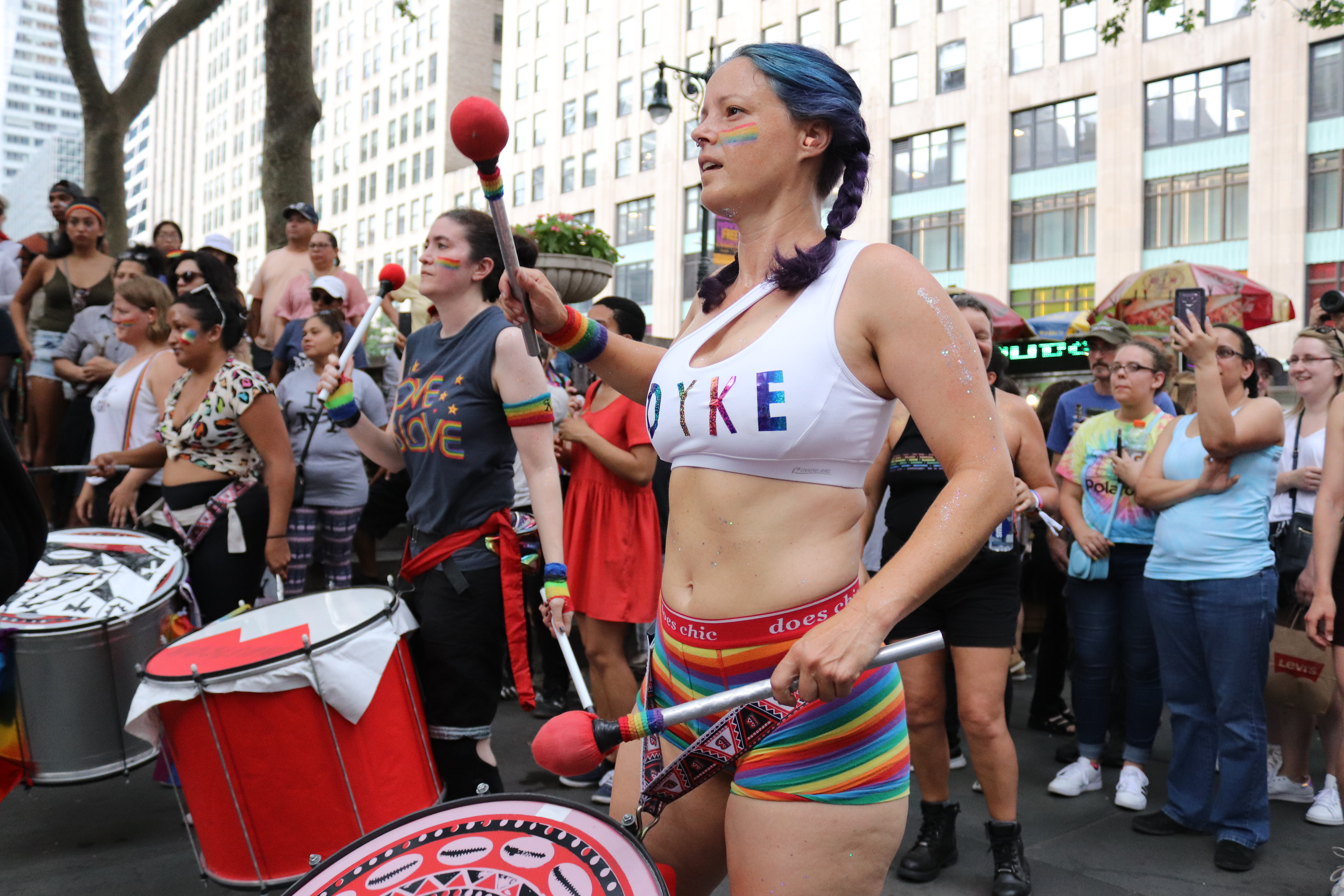
Pre-Dyke March assembly (2019) in New York City

Dyke is a slang term, used as a noun meaning lesbian. It originated as a slur for masculine, butch, or androgynous girls or women. Pejorative use of the word still exists, but the term dyke has been reappropriated by many lesbians to imply assertiveness and toughness.

== Origins and historical usage ==
The origin of the term dyke is obscure and many theories have been proposed. Most etymologies assert that dyke is derived from bulldyke, which has a similar meaning. An early appearance of the term was in an August 1921 article in the journal Medical Review of Reviews titled "The 'Fairy' and the Lady Lover". In this article, Perry M. Lichtenstein, a prison physician in New York City, reports on the case of a female prisoner he examined: "She stated that she had indulged in the practice of 'bull diking,' as she termed it. She was a prisoner in one of the reformatories, and there a certain young woman fell in love with her." The forms bulldyker and bulldyking also appear later on in the Harlem Renaissance novels of the late 1920s, including Eric D. Walrond's 1926 Tropic Death, Carl van Vechten's 1926 Nigger Heaven, and Claude McKay's 1928 Home to Harlem. The Oxford English Dictionary notes the first attestation as Berrey and Van den Bark's 1942 American Thesaurus of Slang, which lists bulldiker as a synonym for lesbian.

The etymology of bulldyke is also obscure. It may be related to the late-19th-century slang use of dike ("ditch") for the vulva. Bull ("male cattle") being used in the sense of "masculine" and "aggressive" (e.g., in bullish), a bulldyke would have implied (with similar levels of offensiveness) a "masculine cunt". Other theories include that bulldyke derived from morphodite, a variant of hermaphrodite; that it was a term for stud bulls and originally applied to sexually successful men; or that it was a dialectical corruption of the name of the rebel Celtic queen Boadicea.

From the mid-19th century to the early 20th century, dike had been American slang for a well-dressed man, with "diked out" and "out on a dike" indicating a young man was in his best clothes and ready for a night on the town. The etymology of that term is also obscure, but may have originated as a Virginian variant of deck and decked out.

In the 1950s, the word dyke was used as a derogatory term for lesbians by straight people, but was also used by lesbians of higher social status to identify crude, rough-bar lesbians.

In a 1970 study, Julia Stanley theorized that the source of these varying definitions stems from gender-determined sub-dialects. Homosexuality in America is a "subculture with its own language." As such, a special vocabulary is developed by its members. Previously, gay men defined dyke as lesbian without derogation. A bull dyke was also defined as a lesbian without further distinction. For lesbians of the community, however, a dyke is an extremely masculine, easily identified lesbian, given to indiscretion. Bull dyke is an extension of this term, with the addition of this person described as nasty, obnoxiously aggressive, and overly demonstrative of her hatred of men.

In 1995, Susan Krantz discussed the etymology of bulldyke, with derivations of the Middle English "falsehood" for bull and dick for dyke (Farmer and Henley 1891). Therefore, a possible origin for a masculine lesbian comes from bulldicker that could specifically mean "fake penis", denoting a "false man". Further speculation talks of the synonymous term bulldagger. Here, dagger also alludes to the male genitalia and bull referring to "false" rather than "man".

== Increasing acceptance ==
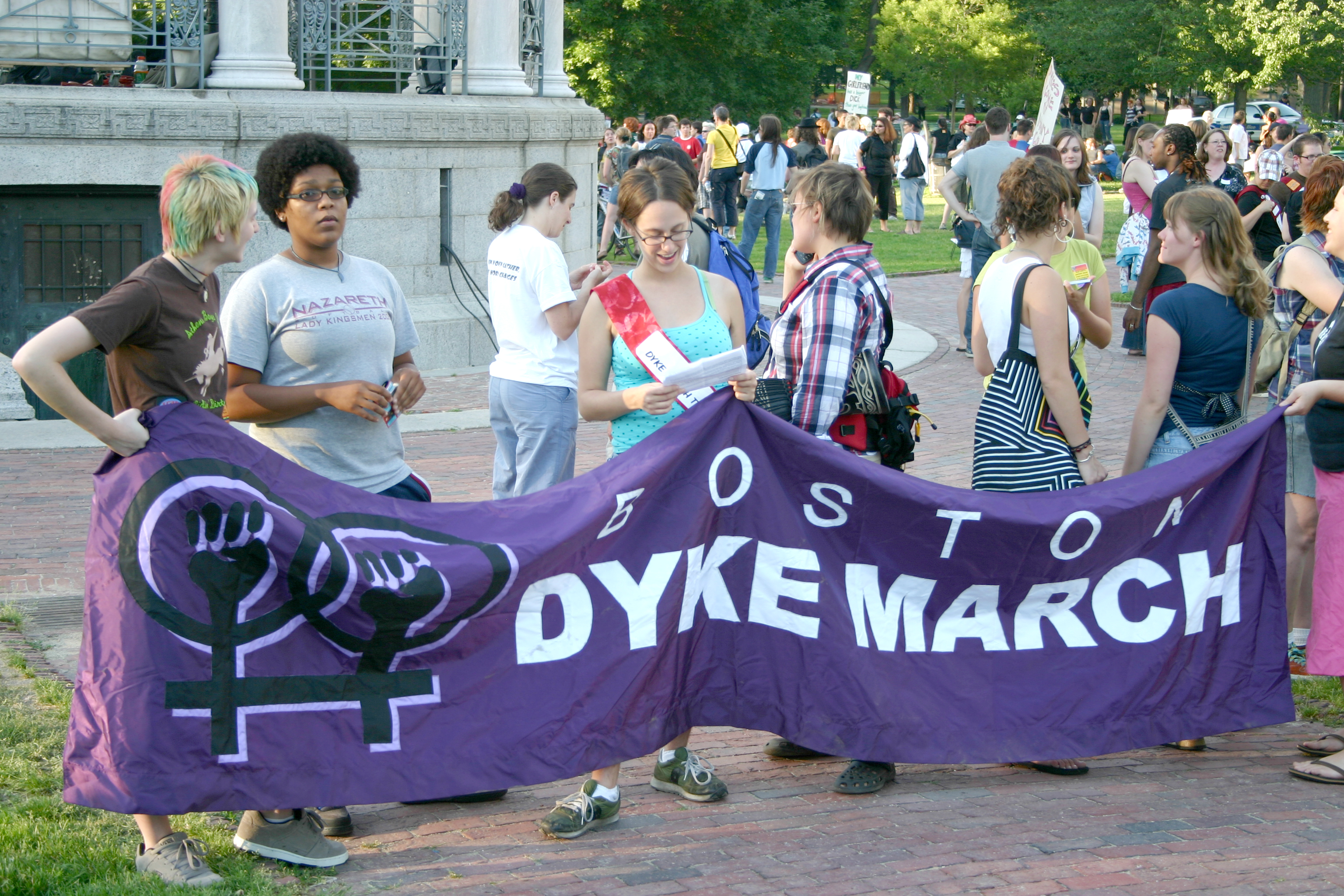
Boston Dyke March (2008), Massachusetts, US

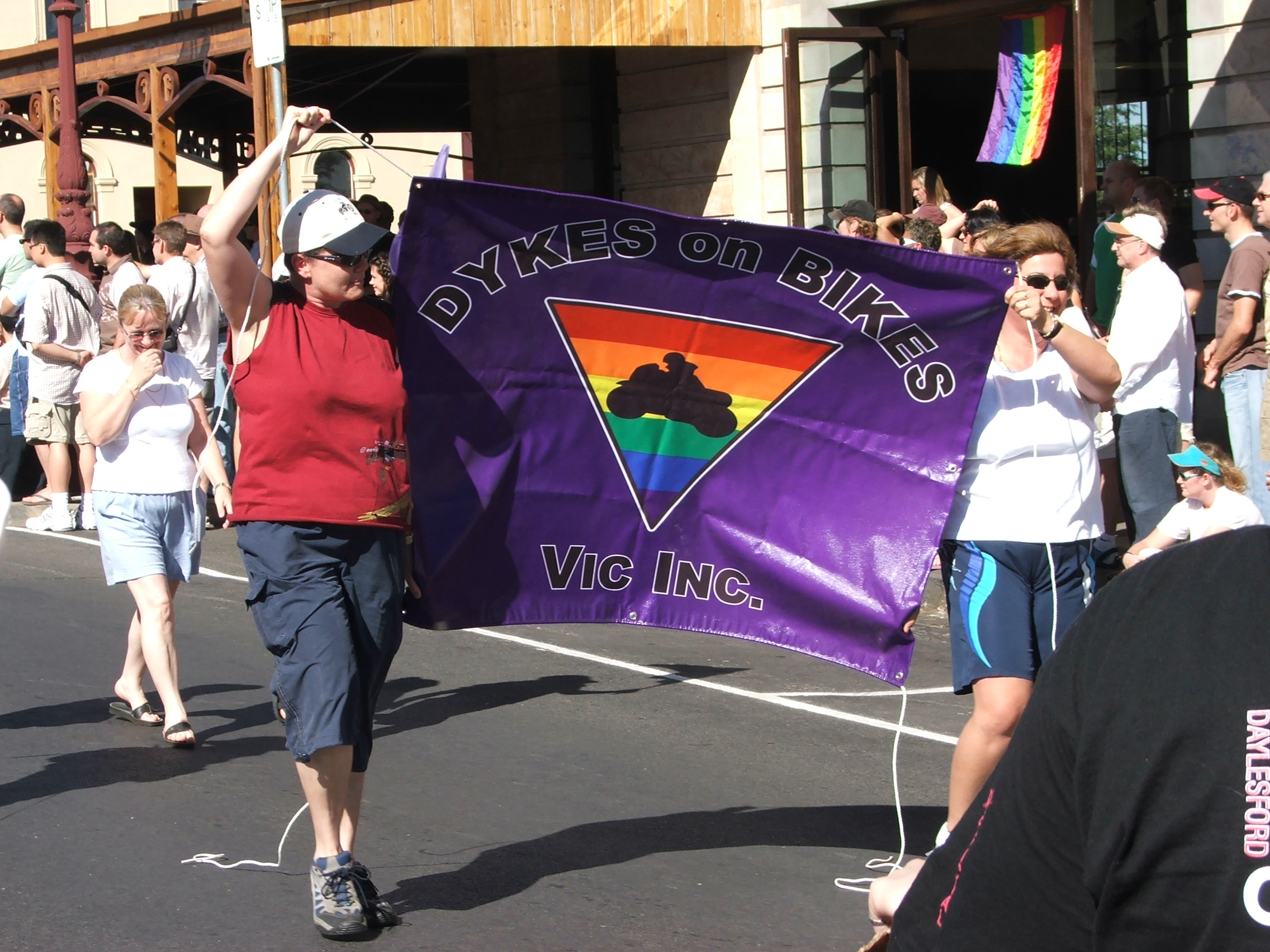
Dykes on Bikes banner (2006), Melbourne Gay Pride, Australia

In 1969, people in the gay community began to march in the streets to demand civil rights. Terms such as dyke and faggot were used to identify people as political activists for the gay community. During this time, dyke referred to a woman committed to revolution, the most radical position. A surge of feminism in the lesbian community led to "dyke separatism", which emphasized that lesbian women should consider themselves to be separate from men, their ideas and movements.

In 1971, the poem The Psychoanalysis of Edward the Dyke by Judy Grahn was published by the Women's Press Collective. This use of dyke empowered the lesbian community because heretofore it had only been employed as a condemnation. Because of the exposure of the word to the public, the term dyke was reclaimed by the lesbian community in the 1970s.

The meaning of dyke has positively changed over time. Most members of the community have dropped bull from the term to use it as a positive identifier of one who displays toughness, or as a simple, generic term for all lesbians. This abbreviation does not carry the negative connotations of the full phrase as it previously did. Scholar Paula Blank, in a 2011 article on lesbian etymology, called for taking ownership of lesbian and similar words.

In the late 20th and early 21st century, the term dyke was claimed by many lesbians as a term of pride and empowerment. Alison Bechdel, author of comic strip Dykes to Watch Out For (1983–2008), said use of the term was "linguistic activism". The strip depicts the lives of a lesbian community and is one of the earliest representations of lesbians in popular culture. It has been described "as important to new generations of lesbians as landmark novels like Rita Mae Brown's Rubyfruit Jungle (1973) and Lisa Alther's Kinflicks (1976) were to an earlier one."

The term dyke is also important in the leather community, who use the term leatherdyke as the counterpart to the gay male "leatherman." For example, in the 1995 documentary BloodSisters, which is about the leatherdyke community, one of the interview subjects says, "I don't want to be called a lesbian, I'm not a lesbian. . . I'm a dyke. And for me, that's a real power word. It's a source of pride, and strength, and it has history for me." Because of its association with the leather community, some may choose to use the term dyke, rather than lesbian, to indicate a position in the feminist sex wars.

In her 2011 article The Only Dykey One, Lucy Jones argues that consideration of lesbian culture is core to an understanding of lesbian identity construction. Matters came to a head when the United States Patent and Trademark Office denied the lesbian motorcycle group Dykes on Bikes a trademark for its name, on the grounds dyke was offensive, derogatory and disparaging to lesbians. However, the office reversed itself and permitted the group to register its name after attorneys appealed and submitted hundreds of pages to show the slang word does not disparage lesbians in the way it once did. On December 8, 2005, Dykes on Bikes won the trademark case, and the organization has since gained international recognition for leading gay pride parades from San Francisco to Sydney.

=== Facebook controversy ===
In June 2017, Facebook censored the use of the word "dyke" on its website as "abusive content". This decision resulted in a Change.org protest petition created by the Listening 2 Lesbians collective that was signed by 7,247 supporters.

== Dyke march ==
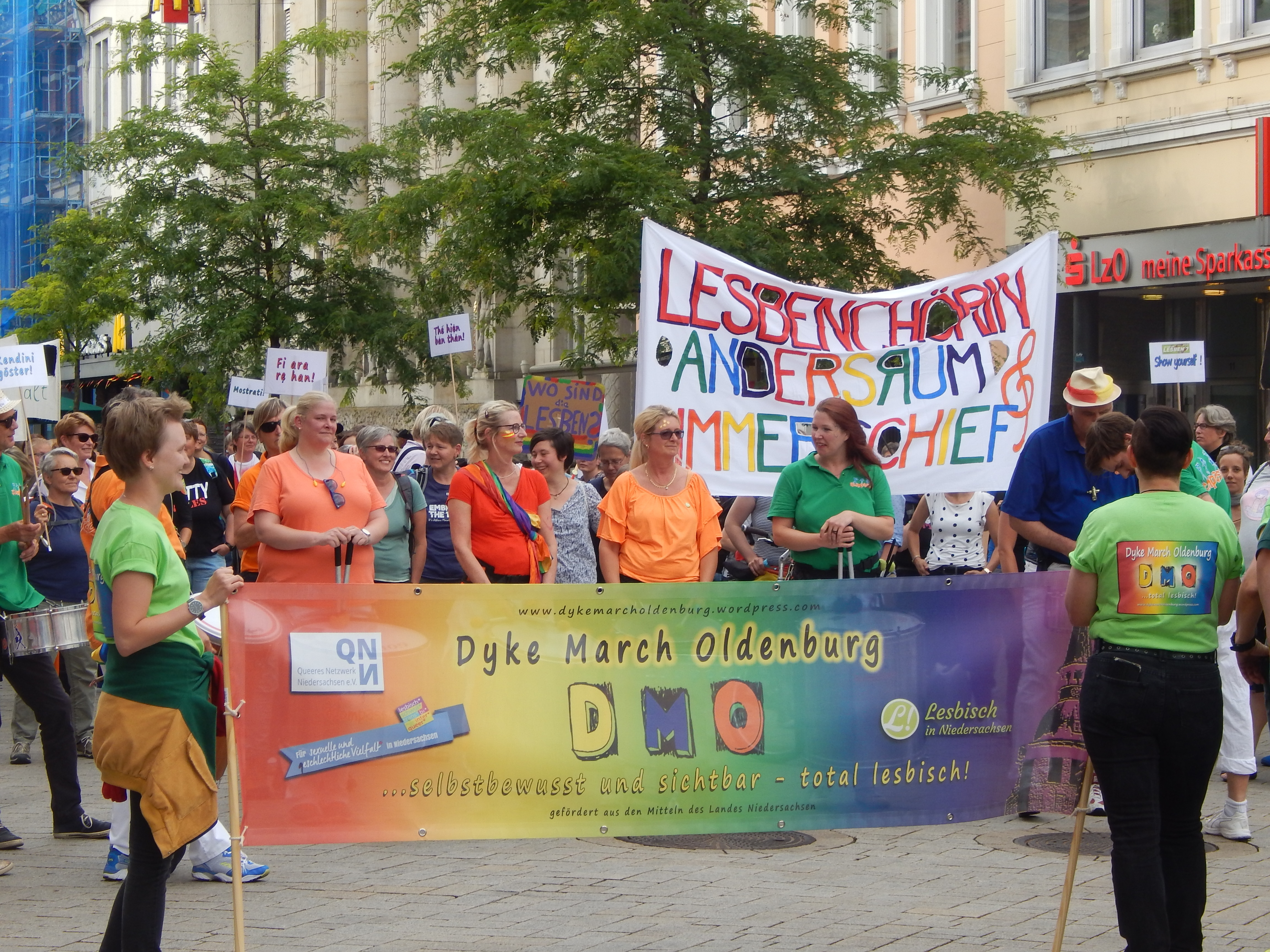
Dyke March (2018), Oldenburg, Germany

Dyke marches have become popular gay pride events nationwide in the United States and Canada. They are generally non-commercial, in contrast to corporate-sponsored pride events, and some are participated in by bisexual and trans women. The stated mission of the Boston Dyke March, for example, is "to provide a dynamic and welcoming space for participants of all sexualities, genders, races, ages, ethnicities, sizes, economic backgrounds, and physical abilities." Marches also take place in several European cities. The United Kingdom's first Dyke March was held in London in 2012. In Germany, the annual Dyke March Berlin was established in 2013. In Mexico, the Marcha Lésbica (Lesbian March) was founded in March 2003 and is held biannually in Mexico City.

== Dyke bar ==
"Dyke bar" is a slang term for lesbian bar, a bar or club frequented by lesbians. The number of dyke bars in the United States has decreased tremendously since the 1980s, from around 200 to 15 in 2019. The COVID-19 pandemic contributed to the closing of dyke bars, with the lack of business preventing bar owners from paying rent, exacerbating an already existing decline in lesbian spaces. The Lesbian Bar Project is an ongoing film and documentation project created by filmmakers Erica Rose and Elina Street in 2020 to document the country's remaining lesbian bars; it has since expanded to Europe. However, there is some evidence that this trend may be reversing in some regions, with an increased number of lesbian bars opening in the United States since 2023.

== Gallery ==
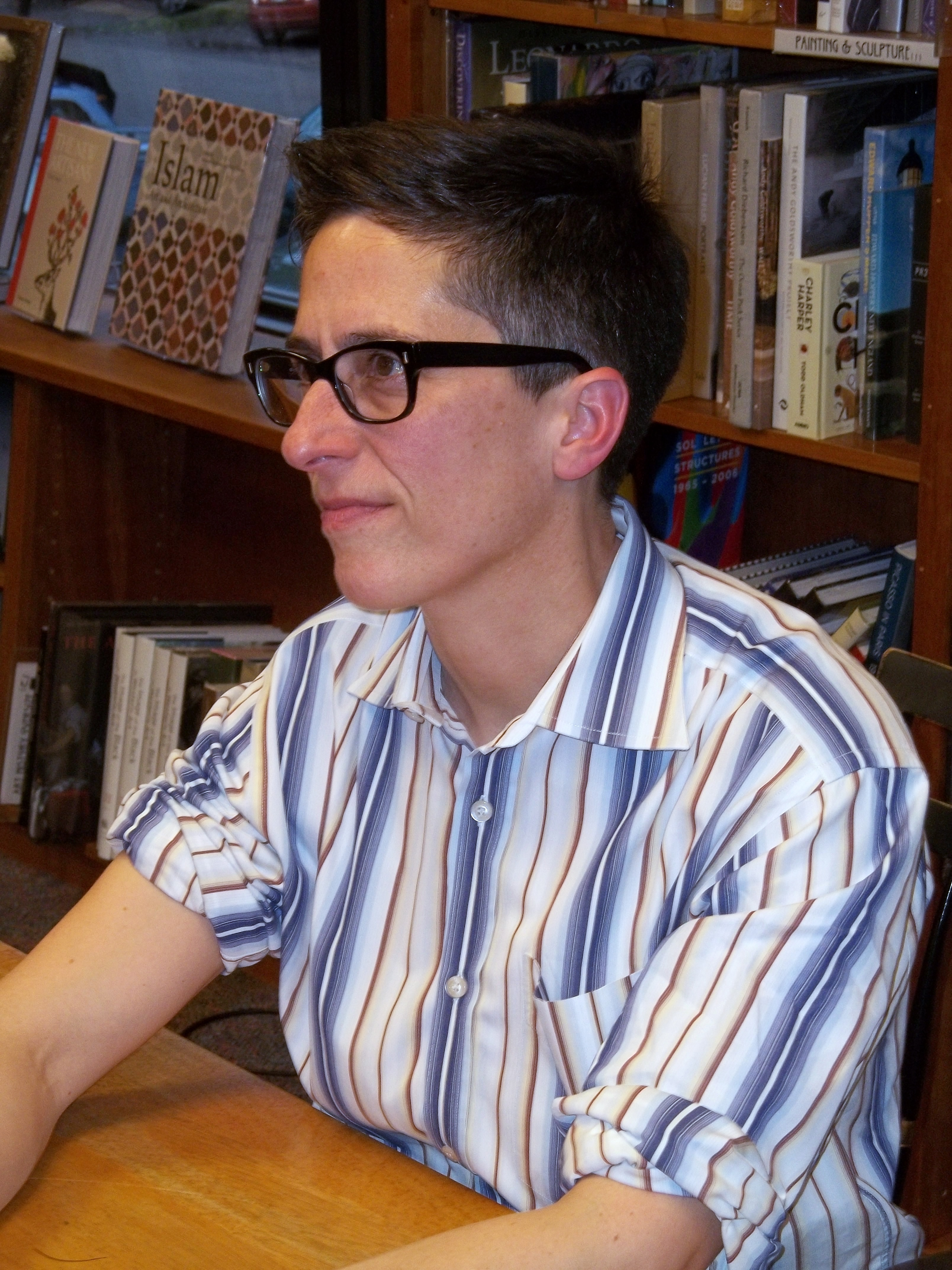
Alison Bechdel, author, Dykes to Watch Out For

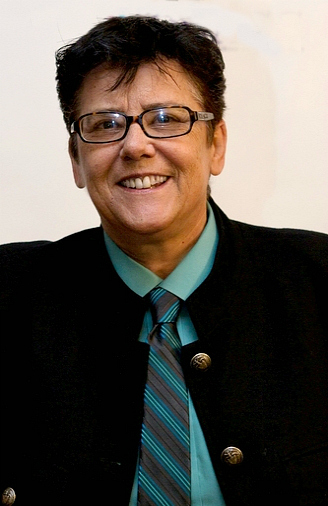
Jeanne Cordova, author, founder of Lesbian Tide

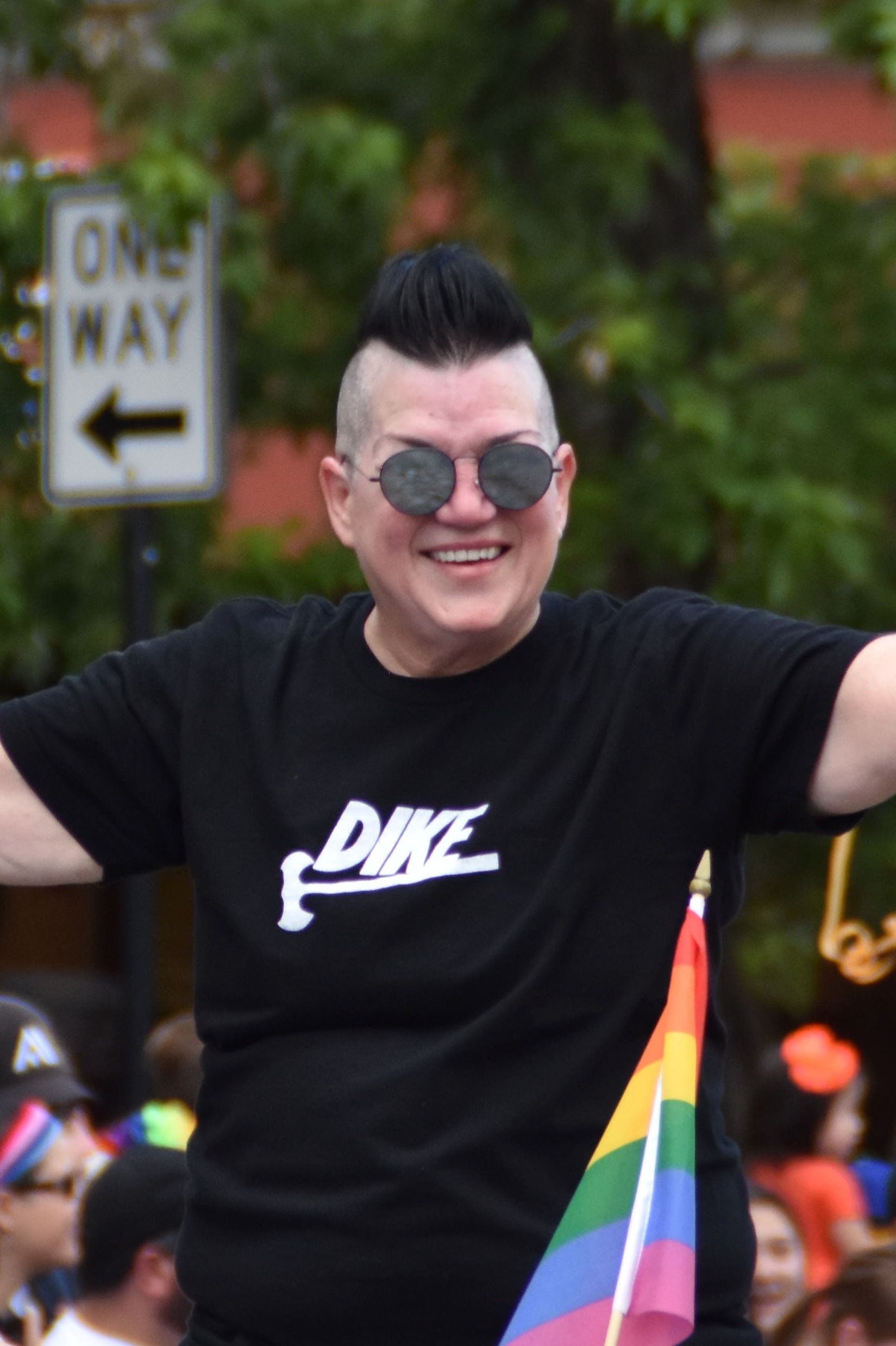
Lea DeLaria, comedian, actress, singer

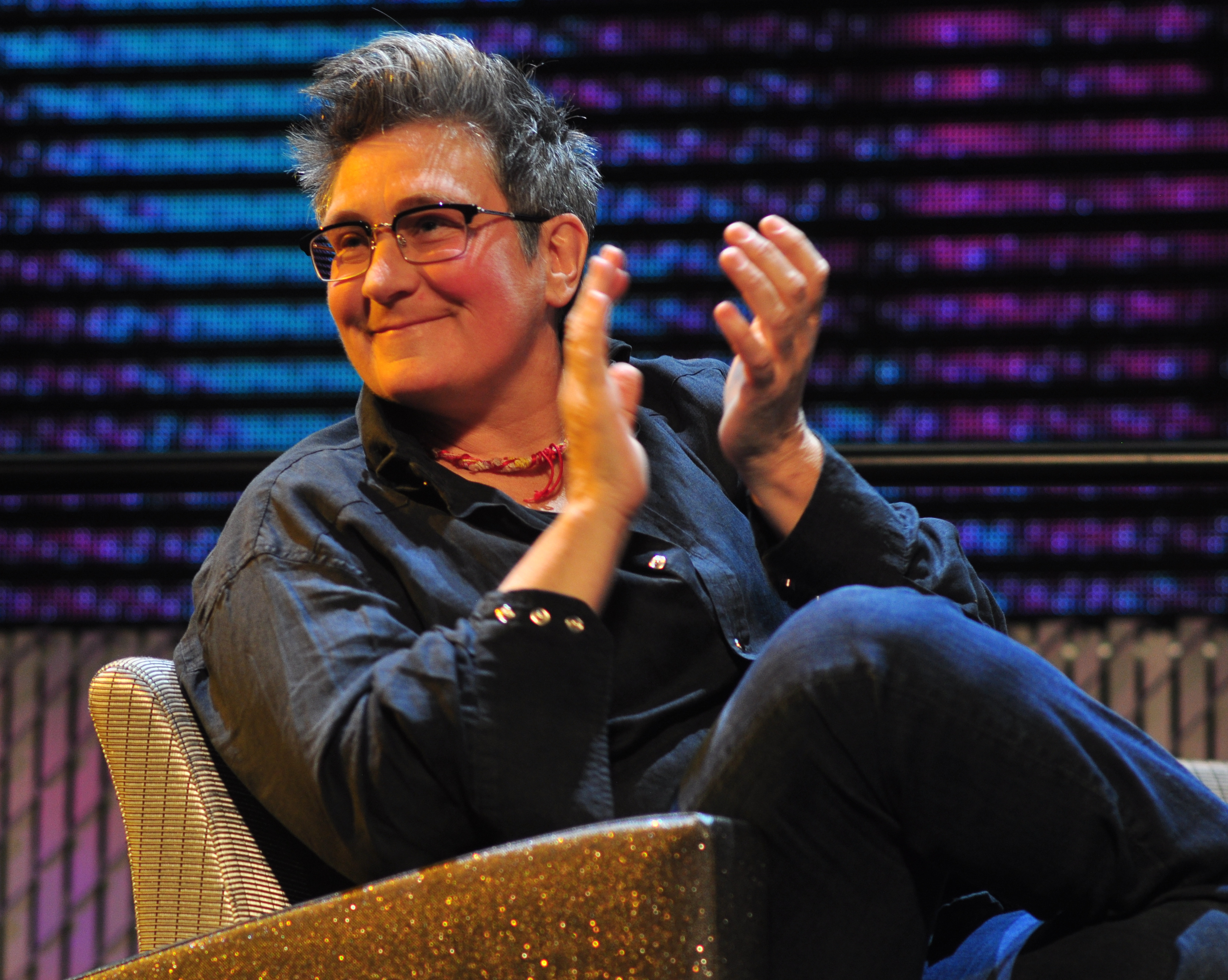
k.d. lang, singer-songwriter

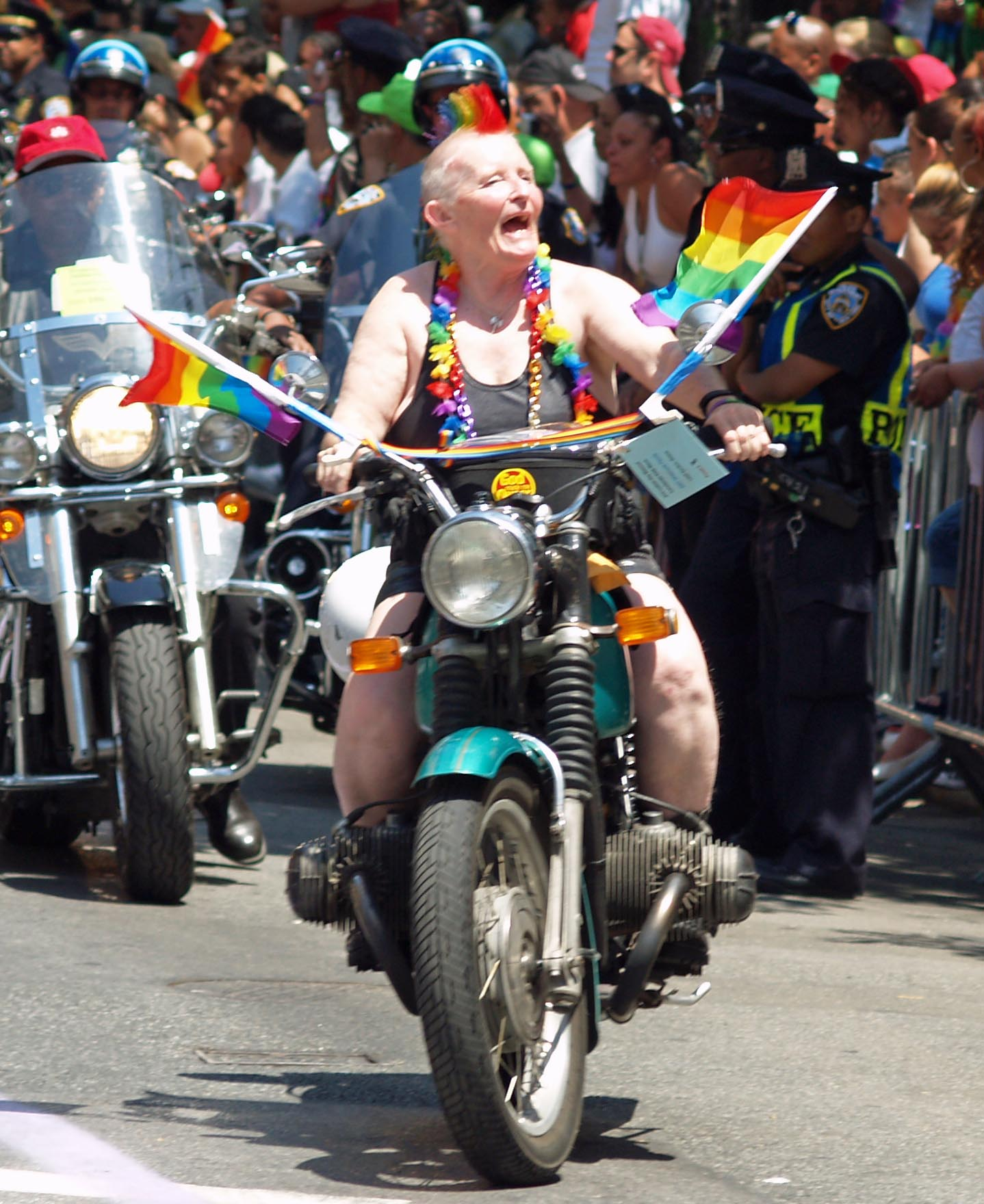
A dyke on a bike at New York City Pride March (2007)

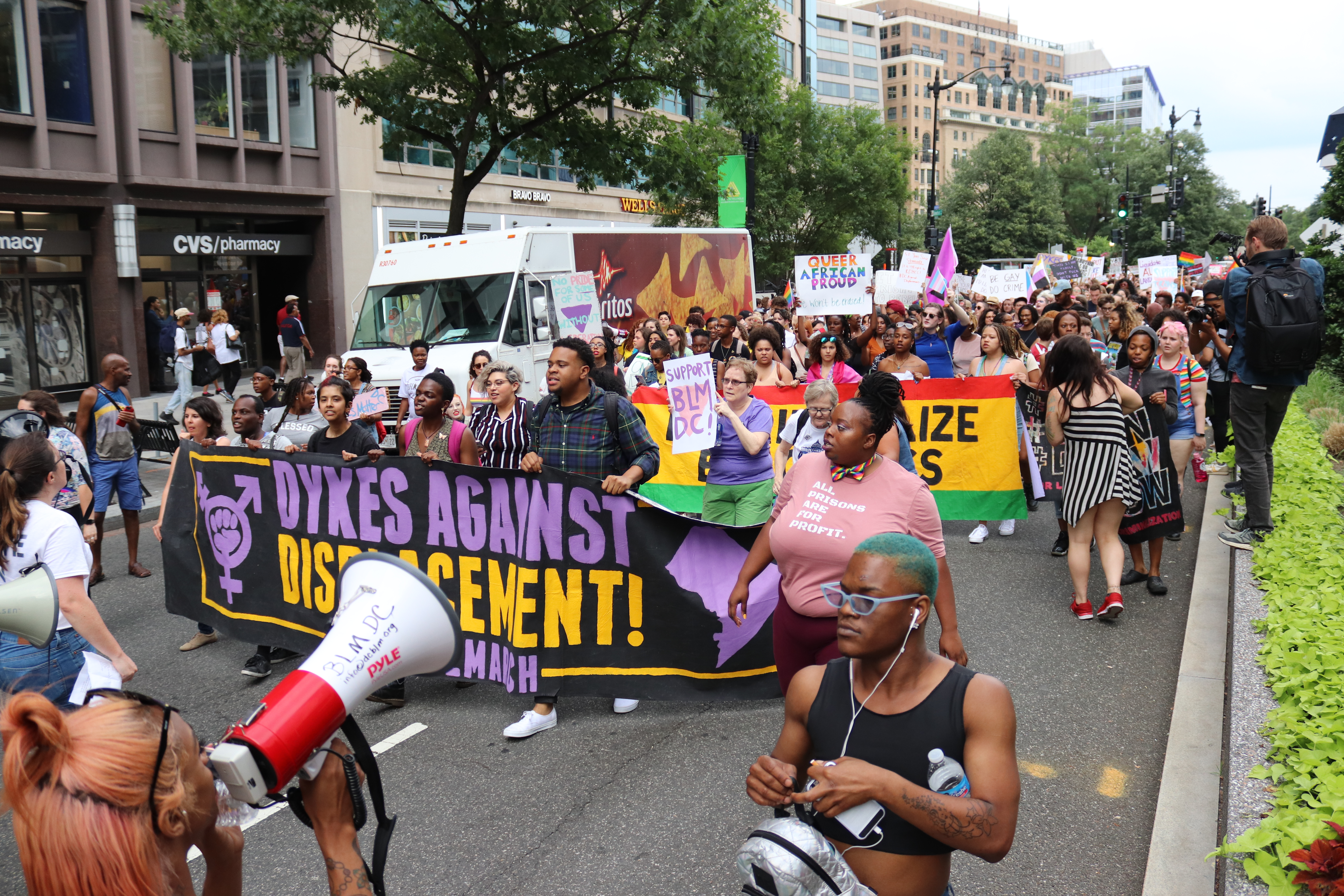
Dyke March, Washington, D.C. (2019)

== See also ==
- LGBT slang
- Queer
- Terminology of homosexuality
- Van Dykes
- Leatherdyke
