= Yas (slang) =

Slang term

Yas (/jɑːs/ YAHSS), sometimes spelled yass, is a playful or facetious slang term equivalent to the excited or celebratory use of the interjection yes. Yas was added to Oxford Dictionaries in 2017 and defined as a form of exclamation "expressing great pleasure or excitement". Yas was defined by Oxygen's Scout Durwood as "a more emphatic 'yes' often paired with 'queen'". Yas can alternatively be spelled with any number of A's and S's in order to increase the grade of excitement or add more emphasis. In other words, the exclamation often appears in the form "Yas, queen!" and sometimes "yaasss!". It is associated with usage by people of the LGBTQ+ community to symbolize excitement or being happy.

== History of the term ==
The earliest use of the spelling yas quoted in the Oxford English Dictionary is from George Colman the Elder's play Spleen in 1776: "Rubrick. We'll go in, and prepare the advertisement. Machoof. Yas, we mun invastigate its axcellent faculties." However, this usage is not the modern slang one. Similarly, yass was used by the character Dean Moriarty (based on Neal Cassady) in Jack Kerouac's 1957 novel On the Road.

Yas was used by Ragtime era music artists such as Blind Boy Fuller in his songs "Throw Your Yas Yas Back in Jail" (1936) and "Get Your Yas Yas Out" (1938).

Yas, with its currently popular meaning and various spelling variants, has roots in late 1980s ball culture, a predominantly black and Latino LGBT subculture in the United States, and was adopted by the wider LGBTQ/queer community in the 1990s, remaining current into the present. The term was used during performances by drag queens, as an expression of encouragement and support, and can be heard (pronounced [jæːs]) in the 1990 documentary film Paris Is Burning, which chronicles New York City's ball culture.

The expression entered the general public lexicon in the 2010s after being used by a Lady Gaga fan expressing his admiration for the singer's appearance in a viral video, and by Ilana Glazer in Broad City. By 2016, yas had spurred discussion as to whether its use by white or non-LGBT people constituted cultural appropriation.

The verb yassify was coined in 2021 as part of an internet meme. To "yassify" an image is to apply AI-based beauty filters to an extreme extent, with humorous results. Image yassification became a meme on Twitter and other social media, particularly when applied to incongruous subjects such as historic works of art, or a frame of actress Toni Collette screaming in the horror film Hereditary.

== See also ==
- LGBTQ slang
- Slay (slang)
- Throw shade (slang)
