= San Francisco Pride =

Annual LGBTQ+ event in San Francisco, California

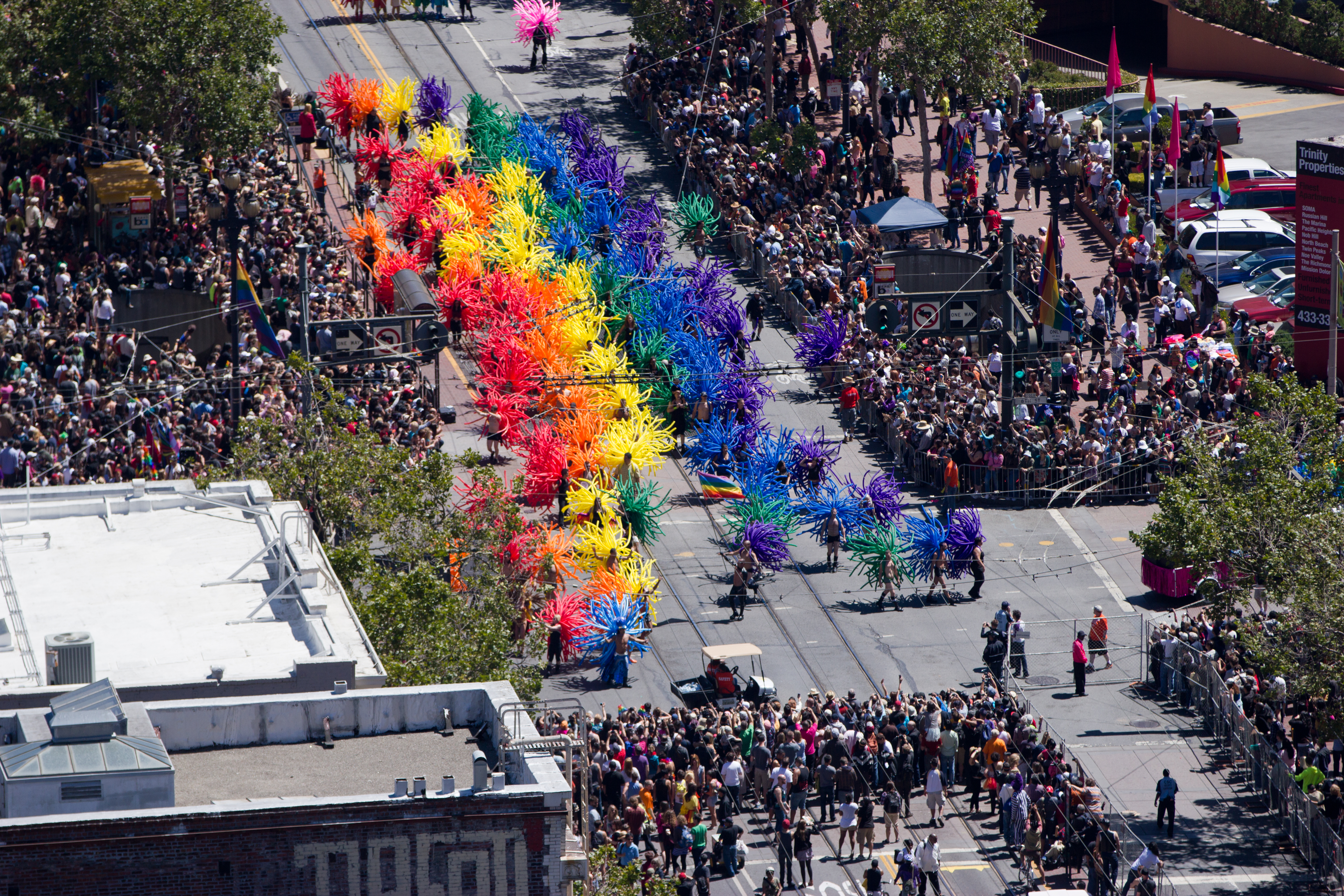
- Genre: Pride parade and festival
- Frequency: Last weekend of June
- Locations: San Francisco, California
- Inaugurated: 1970
- Attendance: 1 million (estimated, 2011)
- Organizer: San Francisco Lesbian, Gay, Bisexual, Transgender Pride Celebration Committee
- Website: www.sfpride.org

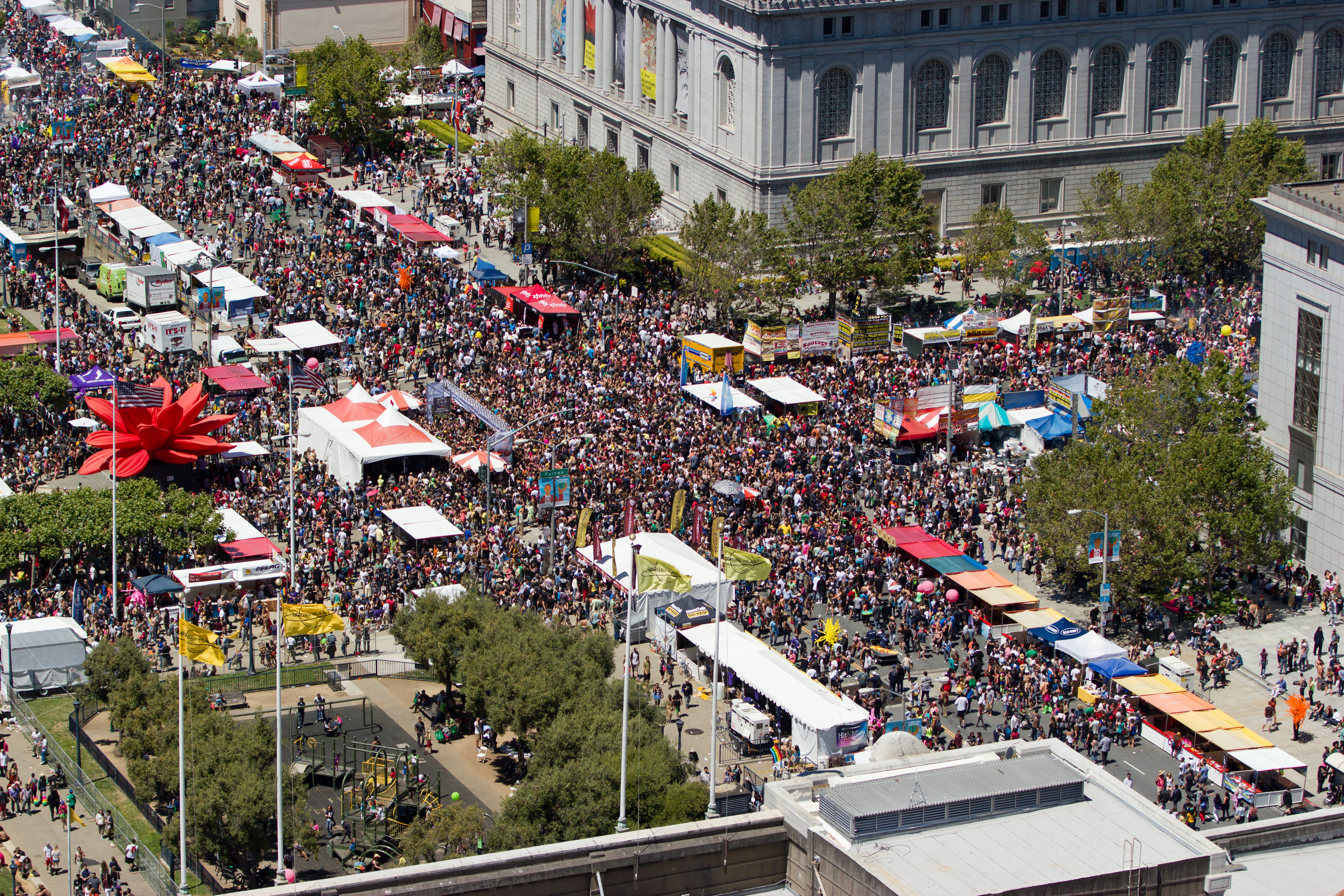
The 2012 San Francisco Pride Festival

The San Francisco Lesbian, Gay, Bisexual, and Transgender Pride Celebration (formerly "International Lesbian and Gay Freedom Day", "Gay Freedom Day", and "Christopher Street West"), usually known as San Francisco Pride, is a pride parade and festival held at the end of June most years in San Francisco, California, to celebrate the lesbian, gay, bisexual, and transgender (LGBT) people.

== Parade ==
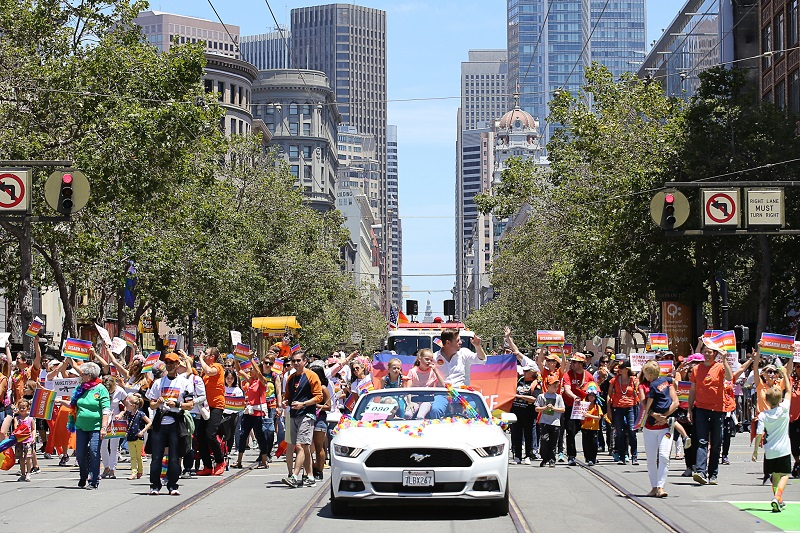
2016 parade

The San Francisco Pride parade is an LGBT pride parade that is held on a Sunday as part of a two-day Festival. The route is usually west along San Francisco's Market Street, from Steuart Street to 8th Street and runs from 10:30 am to approximately 4:00 pm. Participants line up off the route before the parade begins

=== Contingents ===
The parade consists of hundreds of contingents from various groups and organizations. Some of the more well-known contingents are:

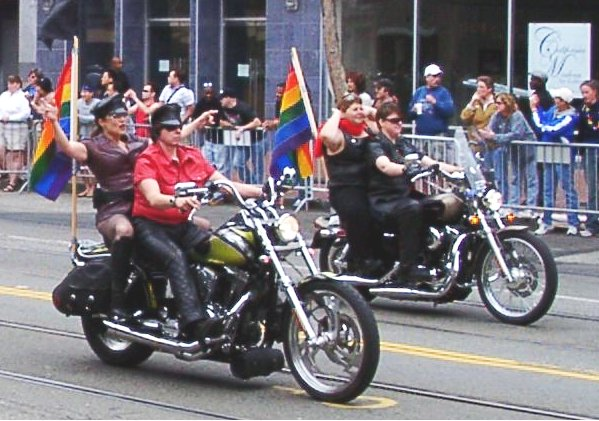
Dykes on Bikes leading the 2005 San Francisco Pride parade. The contingent has hundreds of motorized bikes, many of which are decorated for the event.

- Dykes on Bikes, registered as a legal entity under the full title of "San Francisco Dykes on Bikes® Women’s Motorcycle Contingent", has several hundred motorcycle riders, and their membership has included cisgender and transgender women along dyke identifying gender diverse riders since at least 1995. Some of the riders are topless, some wear leather or fanciful costumes. The sound of hundreds of motorcycle engines gives them a large impact. They are traditionally the first contingent in the parade; one reason for this is that it is difficult for motorcycles to run reliably at the walking pace of the rest of the parade, so as the first contingent they can move at an easier pace. On November 13, 2006, they won a battle to trademark the name "Dykes on Bikes", having struggled since 2003 to persuade the United States Patent and Trademark Office that "dyke" was not an offensive word. Founding member and activist, Soni Wolf was selected to serve as a Community Grand Marshal at the San Francisco Pride parade in 2018. Wolf died in April 2018 before she was able to serve as Community Grand Marshal. Her close friends represented her in the parade by carrying the custom-painted motorcycle tank from the bike she rode during the inaugural ride in 1976.
- PFLAG membership, which includes parents, family, and Chosen family of Queer community members, are a regular contingent of the San Francisco Pride Parade. Members are often not personally queer but rather are straight identified individuals marching and celebrating in support of their queer relatives.
- Politicians frequently participate in the parade, as a way of making themselves visible to LGBT prospective voters.
- LGBT-affirming religious groups of many denominations contribute several dozen contingents.
- Non-profit community groups and LGBT-oriented local businesses contribute more than half of the contingents. It is common for them to decorate a flatbed truck or float, along with loud dance music, or create a colorful contingent that carries a visual message out to the bystanders.
- The leather contingent consists of lesbian, gay, bisexual, transgender, and pansexual leather and BDSM groups. Robert Davolt, editor of Bound & Gagged, was an organizer of the leather contingent.
- Many San Francisco companies have a contingent, sometimes chaptered by LGBT employees of the company, sometimes chaptered by the company as a community outreach or public relations effort to show support of LGBT causes.

During the 1990s, it was common to see anti-gay protestors in the spectator area along the parade route, holding large signs condemning homosexuality. In the 2000s such protestors have become less common.

Drag queens on a float at San Francisco Pride 2005

Hundreds of thousands of spectators line the parade route along Market Street. Some arrive hours in advance to claim a prime spot on the curb with a clear view of the street. Others climb onto bus shelters, the walls of subway station stairs, or scaffolding on buildings to get a clear view. As the parade ends, the spectators are able to pass through the barriers and march down Market street behind the parade. The end of the parade route is near the Festival location at the Civic Center.

== Festival ==
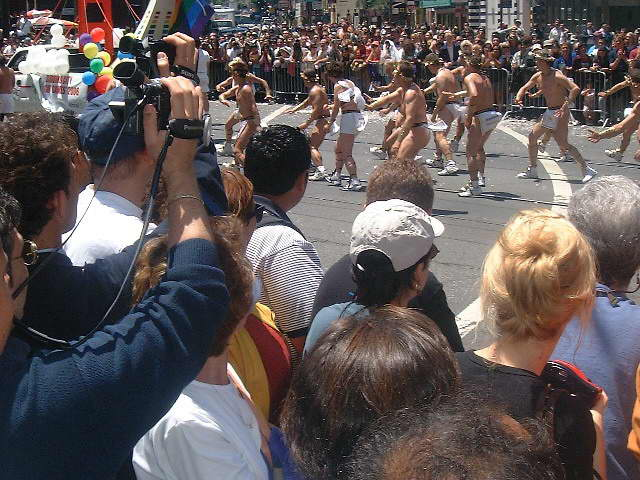
San Francisco Pride

A two-day (Saturday and Sunday) festival has grown up around the Sunday morning parade. It is a collection of booths, dance stages, and vendors around the Civic Center area near San Francisco City Hall. On the Sunday of the parade, an area of the festival called Leather Alley features fetish and BDSM oriented booths and demonstrations.

The festival is traditionally held in the last full weekend in June. This commemorates the Stonewall riots.

The independently organized San Francisco Trans March and fair are held on the Friday before the parade and the Dyke March and fair are held on Saturday both in Dolores Park in the Mission District of San Francisco.

== Administration ==
The festival is run by a non-profit organization, the San Francisco Lesbian, Gay, Bisexual, Transgender Pride Celebration Committee. According to their web site, their mission is "to educate the World, commemorate our heritage, celebrate our culture, and liberate our people." The current executive director is Suzanne Ford, who in 2023 was announced as the first openly transgender person paid to be executive director of the committee.

The event has been funded by combination of community fundraising both by the pride committee and on their behalf, corporate sponsorships, San Francisco city grants, and donations collected from the participants at the festival since its inception. However, since 2025, many of the biggest corporate funders pulled their support as part of a wave of widespread, renewed discrimination against queer individuals and communities following the commencement of Donald Trump's second term as President of the United States. As a result, the festival has struggled to meet fundraising amounts needed to safely host the event during June celebrations. However, organizers announced in 2026 that they had met their fundraising goals despite the 2025 corporate pullback.

Several veteran contractors are employed to take on specific roles for the event.

Also involved in the running of the festival and parade are hundreds of volunteers, including:

- Safety monitors, crews of volunteers who help maintain order on the parade route and in the festival, particularly with respect to crowd control, and participant actions that might be harmful to themselves or others. The Safety Committee philosophy and training has served as the model for many other LGBT events both local and international.
- Hospitality, a team of volunteers led annually by Davace Chin and Michael Fullam and charged with feeding the other volunteers, keeps hundreds coming back year after year.
- Medical volunteers, who provide first aid and medical assistance to participants. These volunteers are typically doctors, nurses, or other trained emergency response staff.
- Contingent monitors, members of the various contingents who maintain cohesion and safety in their contingent. They are recruited and trained by the Parade leadership.

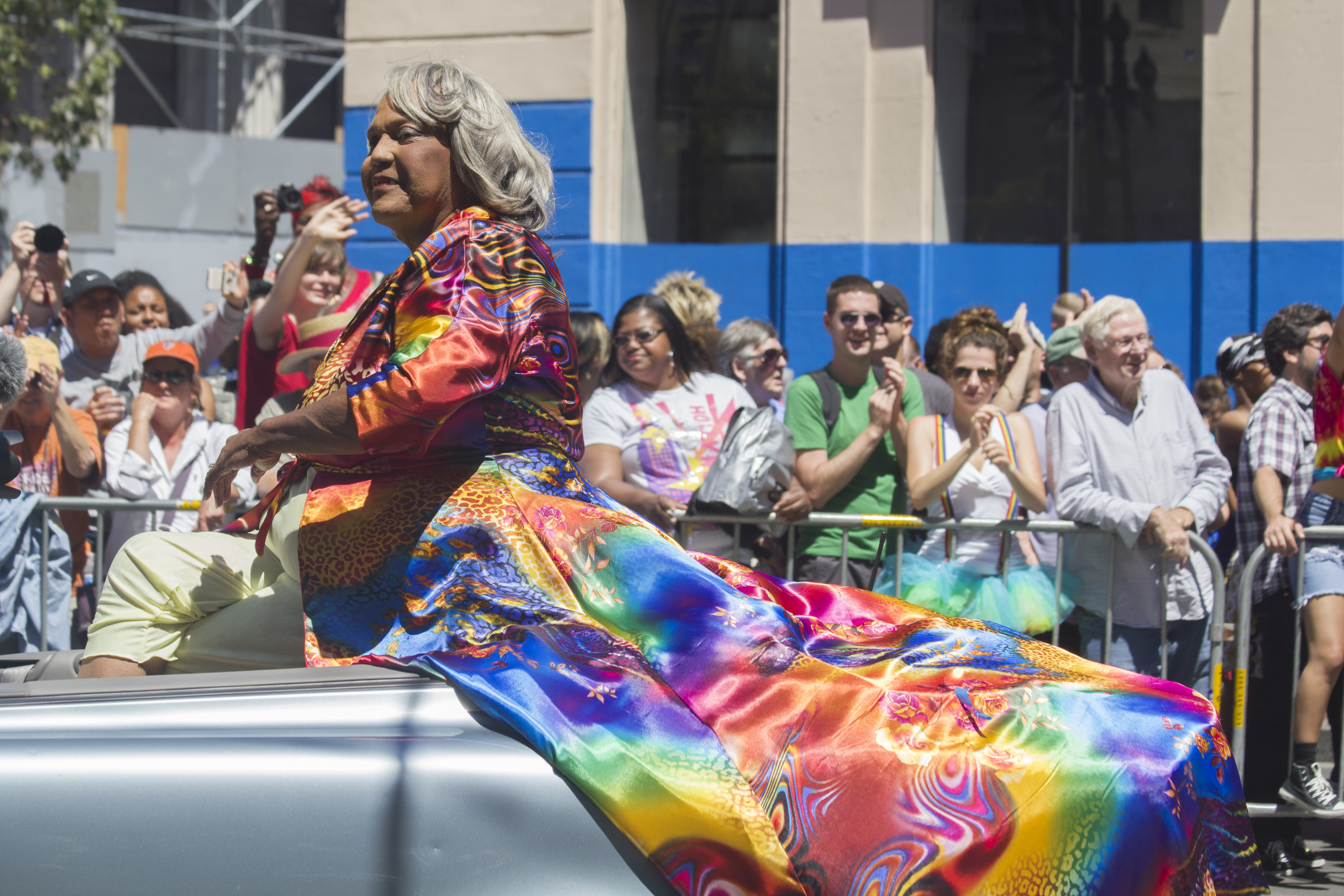
Transgender activist Miss Major Griffin-Gracy at SF Pride 2014

== History ==
Pioneering LGBT activist Harvey Milk took this image on Gay Freedom Day in 1976.

The first events resembling the modern San Francisco Pride parade and celebration were held on the last weekend of June 1970: Organized by the San Francisco Gay Liberation Front, a "Gay Liberation March" saw 20 to 30 people walk from Aquatic Park to Civic Center on Polk Street on Saturday, June 27. The following afternoon, a "Christopher Street Liberation Day Gay-In" brought some 200 people to Golden Gate Park; the gathering was raided by officers from the San Francisco Police Department on Hondas and on horseback, with seven people taken into custody at Park Station, then released without charges.

From 1972 until 2019, the event was held each year. The name of the festival has changed over the years. The event organizers each year select a theme for the event, which is reflected in the logo and the event's publicity.

The original rainbow flags flew at the San Francisco Gay Freedom Day Parade (as it was called then) on June 25, 1978.

In 1986 Autumn Courtney was elected co-chair of San Francisco's Lesbian Gay Freedom Day Pride Parade Committee; she was the first openly bisexual person to hold this sort of position in the United States.

Freedom Rings, designed by David Spada in 1991, were originally sold as a fundraiser for the 1991 San Francisco Gay Freedom Day Parade (as it was called then) and quickly became a national trend.

In October 2009, LGBT activist Amy Andre was appointed as Executive Director of the San Francisco Pride Celebration Committee, making her San Francisco Pride's first openly bisexual woman of color Executive Director.

Also in 2009, Asexual Visibility and Education Network members participated in the first asexual entry into an American pride parade when they walked in the San Francisco Pride Parade. They have entered subsequent parades since.

George Ridgely was hired to the position of Executive Director on January 7, 2014, and served in that position until July 11, 2019.

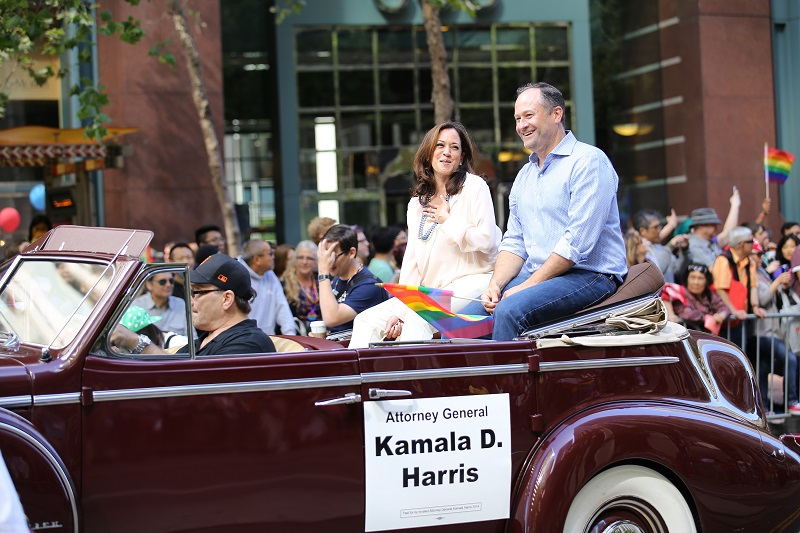
Attorney General Kamala Harris and her husband Douglas Emhoff at San Francisco Pride 2016

In 2016, Black Lives Matter and the TGI Justice Project withdrew from the parade in protest of increased police presence at the event.

In 2019, activists blocked the Pride parade route for almost an hour, in protest of police and corporate presence at the event.

In January 2020, Fred Lopez was named as the new Executive Director, having served in that position in an interim role since July 2019.

The 2020 and 2021 pride events were canceled due to the COVID-19 pandemic.

In 2022, Executive Director Fred Lopez stepped down, and Suzanne Ford, previously the Board Treasurer, became Interim Executive Director. Ford was announced as Executive Director (no longer Interim) in 2023. This made her the first openly transgender person paid to be Executive Director of the San Francisco Lesbian, Gay, Bisexual, Transgender Pride Celebration Committee.

In 2022, the parade's concluding event at Civic Center was cut short by the organizers after a person was spraying mace near the stage, causing a panic, followed by multiple street brawls.

In 2023, for the first time, the San Francisco Pride parade organizers began requesting donations to keep the parade financially afloat.

In 2025, some doubted the continued viability of the parade, precipitated by the withdrawal of numerous financial sponsors, related to distance and questions about its relevance in an evolving cultural landscape. Executive director Suzanne Ford stated that the event will go on and will remain free of admission.

San Francisco Pride History
Year	Dates	Festival name	Theme	Estimated attendance	Notes
1970	June 27–28	San Francisco Gay Liberation March and Christopher Street Riots and Free the Park Gay Liberation Front Gay-In		On Saturday, June 27, an estimated 30 gay men and women and hair fairies (some of whom would now be characterized as transgender or transsexuals) marched down Polk Street through what was then one of San Francisco's primary gay neighborhoods; the following day, several hundred people attended a "gay-in" at Speedway Meadows at Golden Gate Park.	
1971			No Pride festival		Although there was no gay parade per se in 1971, there was a one time event called the Age of Aquarius Parade on a Sunday in August 1971 that marched down Folsom Street from the Embarcadero to 11th St. that functioned very much like a gay parade and was attended by many gay people and had some gay floats. There were mostly floats from spiritual groups and yoga groups. The parade had several thousand attendees.
1972	June 25	Christopher Street West (Note: The 1972 gay parade started from Montgomery and Pine down Montgomery to Post, then up Post to Polk Street. There was a celebration afterward at the Civic Center.)		15,000	The total is for spectators. According to the San Francisco Chronicle, "2,000 male and female participants" marched in the parade.
1973	June 24	Gay Freedom Day (Note: The 1973 gay parade started from Montgomery and Post, down Post to Larkin, up Larkin to Sacramento, and west on Sacramento to Lafayette Park, then a major cruising area, where Mr. Marcus, the first gay emperor of the Imperial Court, presided over a preliminary celebration prior to the main celebration afterward at Marx Meadow in Golden Gate Park.)	A Celebration of the Gay Experience	42,000	
1974	June 30	Gay Freedom Day (Note: The 1974 gay parade started from Grant and Bush, down Grant to O'Farrell, then down O'Farrell to Polk Street. There was a celebration afterward at the Civic Center.)	Gay Freedom by '76	60,000	
1975	June 29	Gay Freedom Day (Note: The 1975 gay parade started at Pine and Montgomery, went down Montgomery to Post, then down Post to Polk Street. There was a celebration afterward at the Civic Center.)	Join Us, The More Visible We Are, The Stronger We Become	82,000	
1976	June 27	Gay Freedom Day (Note: The 1976 gay parade started at Pine and Montgomery, down Montgomery to Market, then down Market to Noe, then up Noe to Duboce Park. There was a celebration afterward at Marx Meadows in Golden Gate Park--since the temperature was 94 F. that day, there was a lot of nudity at this celebration, which was filmed by agents of Anita Bryant to use in her anti-gay campaign.)	United for Freedom, Diversity is our Strength	120,000	
1977	June 26	Gay Freedom Day (Note: In 1977 the gay parade for the first time adopted its present route from Spear Street near the Ferry Building down Market Street to City Hall, with a celebration afterward at the Civic Center.)	Gay Frontiers: Past Present, Future	250,000	
1978	June 25	Gay Freedom Day	Come Out with Joy, Speak out for Justice	240,000	
1979	June 24	Gay Freedom Day	Our Time has Come	200,000	
1980	June 29	Gay Freedom Day	Liberty and Justice for All	250,000	
1981	June 28	International Lesbian & Gay Freedom Day Parade	Front Line of Freedom	250,000	
1982	June 27	International Lesbian & Gay Freedom Day Parade	Out of Many...One	200,000	
1983	June 26	International Lesbian & Gay Freedom Day Parade	Strengthen the Ties, Break the Chains	200,000	
1984	June 24	International Lesbian & Gay Freedom Day Parade	Unity & More in '84	300,000	
1985	June 15	International Lesbian & Gay Freedom Day Parade	Honor our Past, Secure our Future	350,000	
1986	June 29	International Lesbian & Gay Freedom Day Parade	Forward Together, No Turning Back	100,000	
1987	June 28	International Lesbian & Gay Freedom Day Parade	Proud, Strong, United	275,000	
1988	June 26	International Lesbian & Gay Freedom Day Parade	Rightfully Proud		
1989	June 25	International Lesbian & Gay Freedom Day Parade	Stonewall 20: A Generation of Pride		
1990	June 24	International Lesbian & Gay Freedom Day Parade	The Future Is Ours		
1991	June 30	International Lesbian & Gay Freedom Day Parade	Hand In Hand Together		
1992	June 28	International Lesbian & Gay Freedom Day Parade	A Simple Matter of Justice		
1993	June 27	International Lesbian & Gay Freedom Day Parade	Year of the Queer	400,000 - 500,000	
1994	June 19	International Lesbian & Gay Freedom Day Parade	San Francisco to Stonewall: Pride & Protest		
1995	June 18	San Francisco Lesbian, Gay, Bisexual, Transgender Pride Celebration	A World Without Borders		
1996	June 29–30	San Francisco Lesbian, Gay, Bisexual, Transgender Pride Celebration	Equality & Justice For All		
1997	June 28–29	San Francisco Lesbian, Gay, Bisexual, Transgender Pride Celebration	One Community Many Faces		
1998	June 27–28	San Francisco Lesbian, Gay, Bisexual, Transgender Pride Celebration	Shakin' It Up		
1999	June 26–27	San Francisco Lesbian, Gay, Bisexual, Transgender Pride Celebration	Proud Heritage, Powerful Future	700,000	
2000	June 24–25	San Francisco Lesbian, Gay, Bisexual, Transgender Pride Celebration	It's About Freedom	750,000	
2001	June 23–24	San Francisco Lesbian, Gay, Bisexual, Transgender Pride Celebration	Queerific	850,000	
2002	June 29–30	San Francisco Lesbian, Gay, Bisexual, Transgender Pride Celebration	Be Yourself, Change the World	850,000	
2003	June 28–29	San Francisco Lesbian, Gay, Bisexual, Transgender Pride Celebration	You've Gotta Give Them Hope	850,000	
2004	June 26–27	San Francisco Lesbian, Gay, Bisexual, Transgender Pride Celebration	Out 4 Justice	850,000	
2005	June 25–26	San Francisco Lesbian, Gay, Bisexual, Transgender Pride Celebration	Stand Up, Stand Out, Stand Proud	850,000	
2006	June 24–25	San Francisco Lesbian, Gay, Bisexual, Transgender Pride Celebration	Commemorate, Educate, Liberate—Celebrate!	850,000	
2007	June 23–24	San Francisco Lesbian, Gay, Bisexual, Transgender Pride Celebration	Pride Not Prejudice	1 million	
2008	June 28–29	San Francisco Lesbian, Gay, Bisexual, Transgender Pride Celebration	United by Pride, Bound for Equality	1.2 million	
2009	June 27–28	San Francisco Lesbian, Gay, Bisexual, Transgender Pride Celebration	In Order to Form a More Perfect Union...	1.2 million	
2010	June 26–27	San Francisco Lesbian, Gay, Bisexual, Transgender Pride Celebration	Forty and Fabulous	1.2 million	
2011	June 25–26	San Francisco Lesbian, Gay, Bisexual, Transgender Pride Celebration	In Pride We Trust	1 million	
2012	June 23–24	San Francisco Lesbian, Gay, Bisexual, Transgender Pride Celebration	Global Equality		
2013	June 29–30	San Francisco Lesbian, Gay, Bisexual, Transgender Pride Celebration	Embrace, Encourage, Empower	1.5 Million	
2014	June 28–29	San Francisco Lesbian, Gay, Bisexual, Transgender Pride Parade and Celebration	Color Our World With Pride	1.7 million	
2015	June 27–28	San Francisco Lesbian, Gay, Bisexual, Transgender Pride Parade and Celebration	Equality Without Exception	1.8 million	
2016	June 25–26	San Francisco Lesbian, Gay, Bisexual, Transgender Pride Parade and Celebration	For Racial and Economic Justice	TBD	
2017	June 24–25	San Francisco Lesbian, Gay, Bisexual, Transgender Pride Parade and Celebration	A Celebration of Diversity	TBD	
2018	June 23–24	San Francisco Lesbian, Gay, Bisexual, Transgender Pride Parade and Celebration	Generations of Strength	TBD	
2019	June 29–30	San Francisco Lesbian, Gay, Bisexual, Transgender Pride Parade and Celebration	Generations of Resistance	TBD	SF Pride for 2020 and 2021 were canceled due to the coronavirus pandemic.
2022	June 25–26				

Note: Several facts in this section are taken from "San Francisco LGBT Historical Timeline" by KQED (see External links). The themes of Pride festivals from 1970 to 2015 may be seen at San Francisco Pride website.

=== 2013 Chelsea Manning controversy ===
On April 24, 2013, Pride announced that its electoral college had chosen U.S. Army Private First Class Chelsea (then known as Bradley) Manning, at the time imprisoned for leaking classified documents to WikiLeaks, as Community Grand Marshal in absentia for the 43rd annual Gay Pride Parade. Two days later, Pride's board president vetoed the election, declaring it "an error" due to a "systemic failure that now has become apparent and will be rectified." The board subsequently explained that the category in which Manning was elected is restricted to "a local hero (individual) not being a celebrity"—neither of which befit Manning.

Both the election and its nullification proved contentious. On April 29, an estimated 200 protesters disrupted the board's meeting, demanding that PFC Manning be reinstated. Supporters of Manning filed a complaint with the San Francisco Human Rights Commission. On May 12, the board said it would meet "in a larger venue after the 2013 Celebration and Parade [to] allow people from all sides of that issue and others to fully air and hear one another's viewpoints", but that it would not "let one issue, as important as it is to some, overshadow the concerns and interests of the hundreds of thousands who attend SF Pride." On May 18, SF Pride selected Bebe Sweetbriar as Community Grand Marshal. On June 7, 2013, the board announced that since none of the alternatives submitted at a May 31 community forum garnered a consensus majority, the board's decision to rescind PFC Manning's grand marshalship would stand. The board also reported that the San Francisco Human Rights Commission had declined to investigate the discrimination claims filed against SF Pride.

== Notable performers ==
- The B-52s
- Joan Baez
- Backstreet Boys
- Sandra Bernhard
- Betty Who
- Big Freedia
- Blush
- BoA
- Kimberly Caldwell
- Colette Carr
- Ryan Cassata
- Margaret Cho
- Chumbawamba
- The Cliks
- Kimberly Cole
- Inaya Day
- Deep Dark Robot
- Dead or Alive
- Kat DeLuna
- En Vogue
- Erasure
- Exposé
- Rochelle Fleming
- Kat Graham
- Jennifer Holliday
- Janis Ian
- Erika Jayne
- Grace Jones
- Karmin
- Kehlani
- Kerli
- Chaka Khan
- Solange Knowles
- Lady Bunny
- Lady Gaga
- Lady Miss Kier
- Amara La Negra
- Lime
- Lisa Lisa
- Luciana
- The Motels
- Myra
- Me'shell Ndegeocello
- Neon Trees
- Pansy Division
- CeCe Peniston
- The Pointer Sisters
- Rose Royce
- The Ssion
- Jessica Sutta
- Sylvester
- Third Eye Blind
- Gloria Trevi
- Ultra Naté
- Martha Wash
- Crystal Waters
- Pabllo Vittar
- The Weather Girls

== See also ==
- Dyke march
- Trans march
- Pink Saturday, a separate celebration held in the Castro on Saturday night of SF Pride.
- LGBTQ culture in San Francisco
