= Slay (slang) =

Revived 1600s colloquialism

Slay is a slang colloquialism that possibly originated during the 1500s, but gained its current popular definition from ballroom culture. Originating likely from a phrase meaning a well-received joke, slay has since been adopted as a term which conveys being impressed or showing agreement.

== History ==
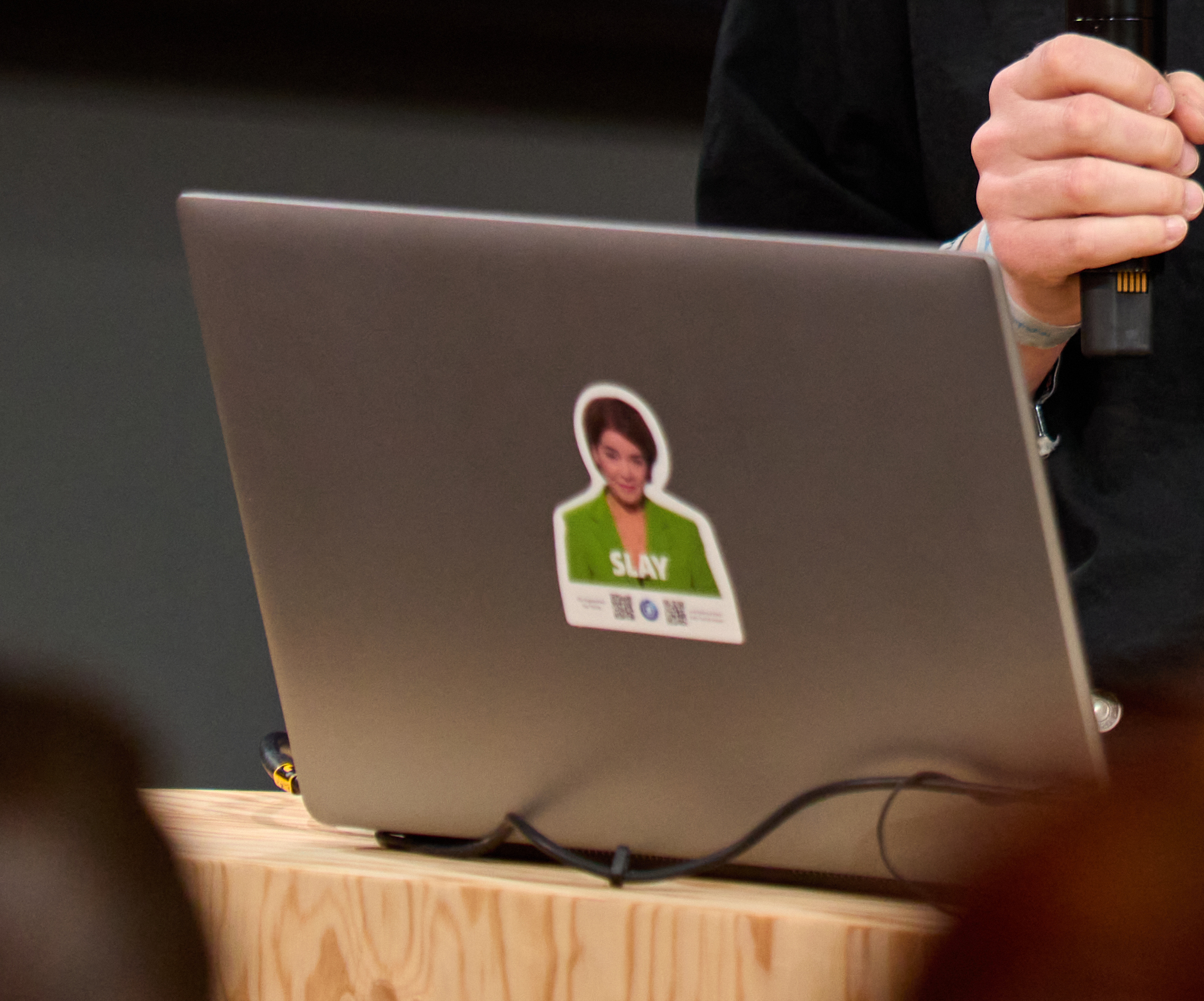
Sticker of German television presenter Susanne Daubner with the phrase (2025)

While the term slay is often used in the context of murder or killing, first use of the term as slang is first listed in 1593, meaning something similar to "dying of laughter". It saw a resurgence in the Roaring Twenties under a very similar meaning.

The term grew in popularity in the 1970s through ballroom culture, particularly among Black, Latino, and queer communities, gaining a place in African-American Vernacular English. Slay gained considerable attention after the release of Paris Is Burning which documented ballroom culture in New York City in 1990, as the term was often used in the film. Slay started to gain a connotation of a term of agreement and for something to be impressive.

With its prominence in the LGBT community, the term has seen a growth outside of these communities since 2009 as a result of RuPaul's Drag Race, where slay, as other terms used mainly in the LGBT community, were thrown around between contestants.

The term reached mainstream status in 2016 due to its use by Beyoncé in her song "Formation", which was performed at the Super Bowl 50 halftime show. "Formation" contains a repeating line "'Cause I slay (slay), I slay (hey)" found between verses, as well as at the end of lyrics such as "now let's get in formation", which is followed by the response "'cause I slay".

Slay has since gained significant popularity and mainstream usage on social media, in both an ironic and unironic context. As a result, it has sparked discussion on whether this expanded usage of the term past African-American Vernacular English speakers constitutes appropriation.

== See also ==
- Vogue (dance)
- Yas (slang)
