= DragCon =

DragCon is a drag exposition or fan convention:

It could refer to:

- RuPaul's DragCon LA, the first expo started in 2015
- Digital DragCon, held online in 2020 in lieu of the LA one canceled due to COVID-19 pandemic
- RuPaul's DragCon NYC, started in 2017
- RuPaul's DragCon UK, starting in 2020
- DragCon South Africa, DragCon SA, a company presenting drag queen shows including touring Drag Race performers
- DragWorld, a London, England convention
- Austin International Drag Festival's Kingfest, a drag king convention
- King Con in Ohio, a drag king convention
