= LGBTQ stereotypes =

Stereotypes around LGBTQ people and communities

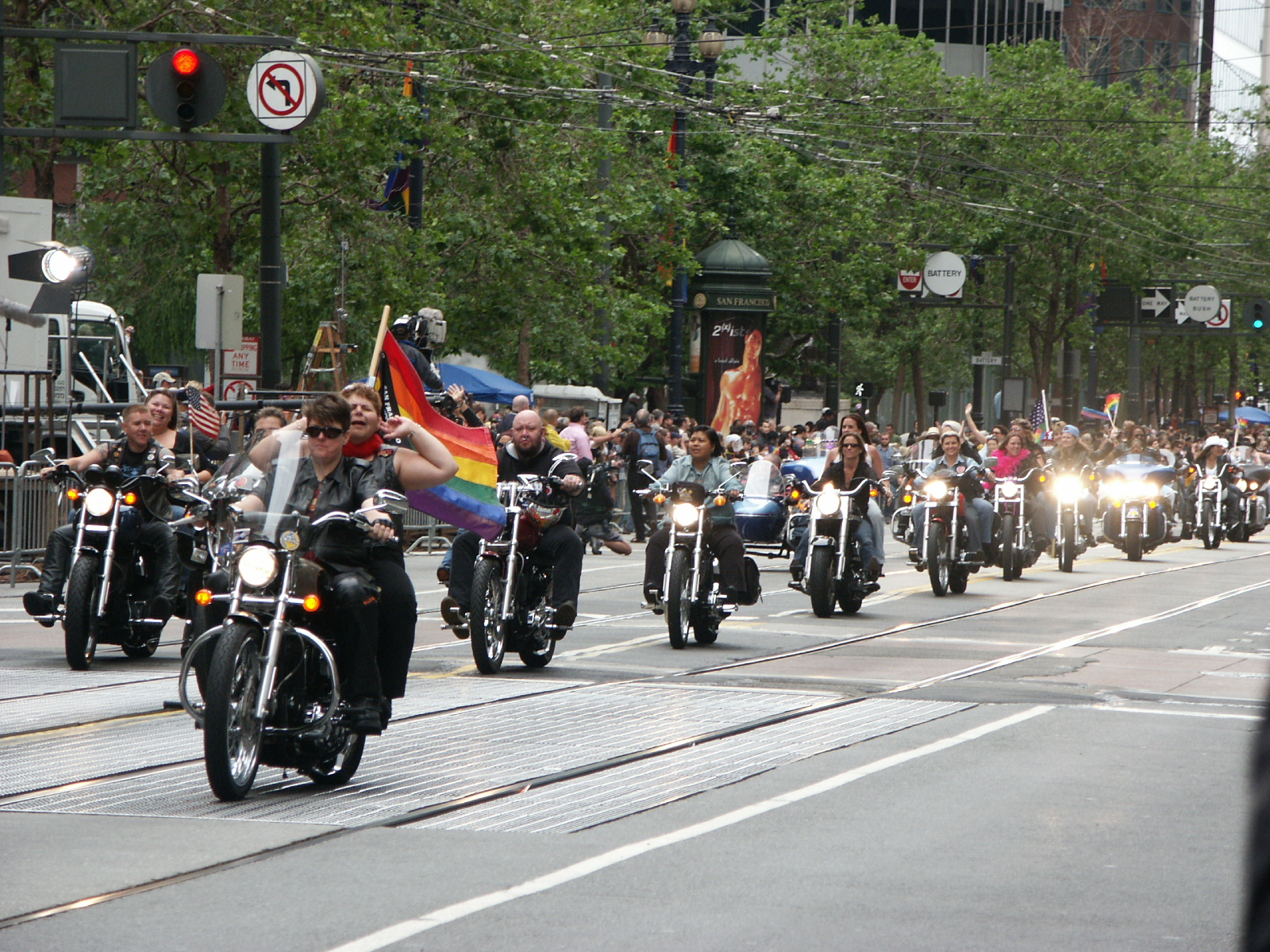
The Dykes on Bikes motorcycle group in a pride parade, exhibiting a stereotype of butch lesbians.

LGBTQ stereotypes are stereotypes about lesbian, gay, bisexual, transgender, and queer (LGBTQ) people based on their sexual orientations, gender identities, or gender expressions. Stereotypical perceptions may be acquired through interactions with parents, teachers, peers and mass media, or, more generally, through a lack of firsthand familiarity, resulting in an increased reliance on generalizations.

Negative stereotypes are often associated with homophobia, lesbophobia, gayphobia, biphobia, or transphobia. Positive stereotypes, or counterstereotypes, also exist.

== In general ==
=== Media ===
The portrayal of the LGBTQ community in media has historically reinforced negative stereotypes and societal norms, excluded LGBTQ+ individuals, and tokenized them by reducing their representation to their sexual orientation or gender identity. Media portrayals of LGBTQ+ individuals can influence both society attitudes and how LGBTQ+ individuals view themselves. Positive media representations can improve visibility and understanding of LGBTQ+ people and may help support allyship. Positive media representations can improve visibility and understanding of LGBTQ+ people and may help support allyship. In recent years, LGBTQ representation in media has increased, with more diverse and complex characters appearing in film.

=== Effects of stereotypes ===
LGBTQ stereotypes can affect how LGBTQ people are treated and how they see themselves. Studies have found that being exposed to stereotypes can increase stress, contribute to mental health struggles, and affect identity development (Them, 2020). This is especially true when individuals do not have access to supportive environments, communities, or positive representation.

Stereotypes can also influence everyday interactions and increase the risk of discrimination, exclusion, or unfair treatment in places such as schools, workplaces, and healthcare settings. Media and society can continue to spread and reinforce stereotypes, which affects how people think about LGBTQ individuals and how they are treated in everyday life.

=== History ===
LGBTQ stereotypes have been around for a long time in media and culture, often reflecting how society viewed sexuality and gender at different points in history. In earlier film and television, gay men were often shown as extremely feminine or used for jokes, while lesbian women were often shown as masculine or overly sexualized. These kinds of portrayals limited how LGBTQ people were seen and understood.

In the past, LGBTQ identities were also often linked with negative ideas such as being "deviant" or criminal in both media and society. Transgender people, when included at all, were often portrayed as mentally unstable. Over time, representation has become more diverse and realistic (Gomillion & Giuliano, 2011); however, some of these older stereotypes can still appear in modern media.

=== Murder and violence ===
LGBT rights activists have fought against fictional representations of LGBT people that depict them as violent and murderous. Columnist Brent Hartinger observed that "big-budget Hollywood movies until, perhaps, Philadelphia in 1993 that featured major gay male characters portrayed them as insane villains and serial killers". Community members organized protests and boycotts against films with murderous LGBT characters, including Cruising (1980), Silence of the Lambs (1991), and Basic Instinct (1992). Theatre scholar Jordan Schildcrout has written about the recurrence of the "homicidal homosexual" in American plays but notes that LGBT playwrights themselves have appropriated this negative stereotype to confront and subvert homophobia. Such plays include The Lisbon Traviata (1985) by Terrence McNally, Porcelain (1992) by Chay Yew, The Secretaries (1993) by the Five Lesbian Brothers, and The Dying Gaul (1998) by Craig Lucas.

== Bisexual people ==
=== Indecision ===
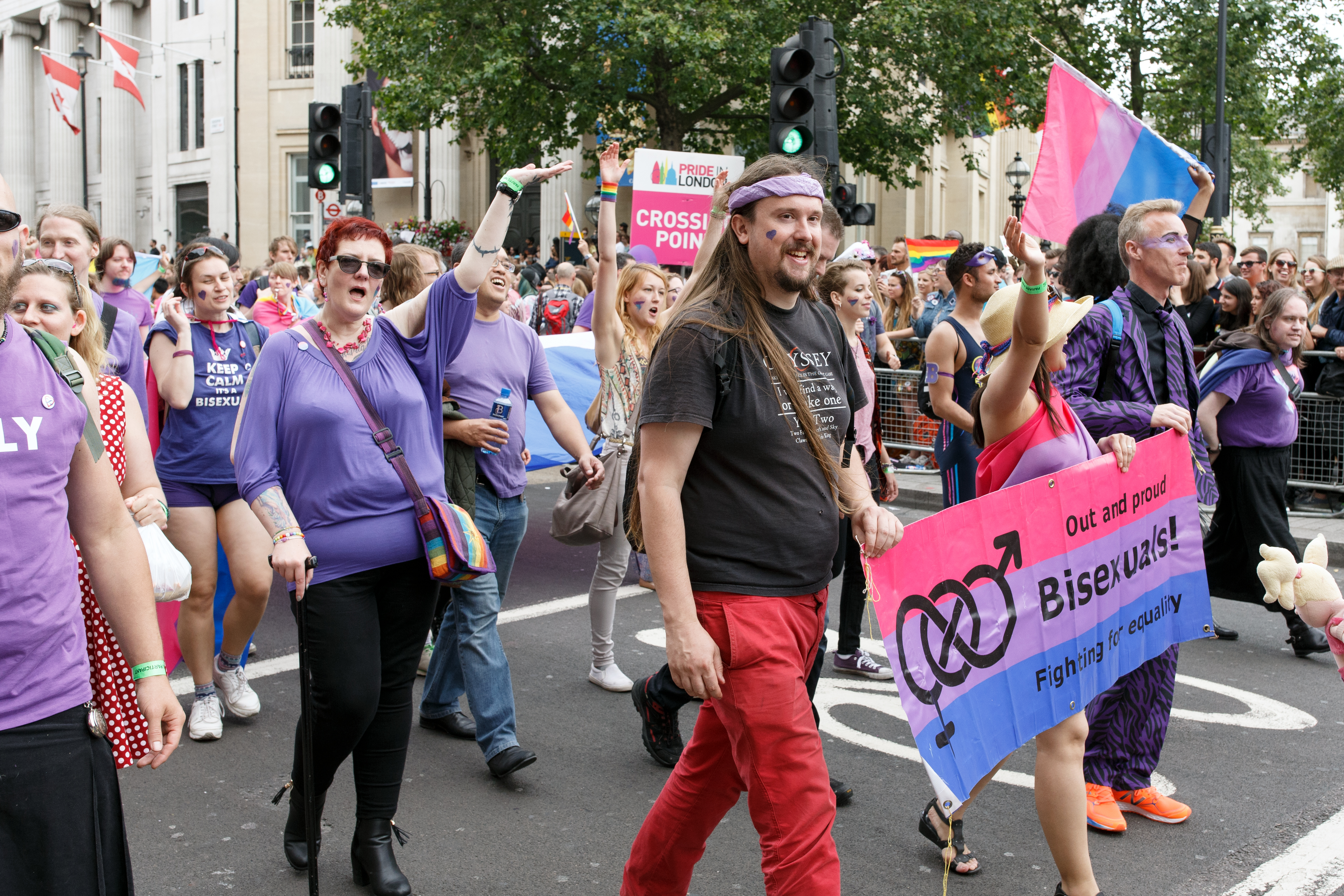
Bisexual people are sometimes excluded from LGBT events and community gatherings as they are seen as being in an experimental phase.

Many bisexual people are often characterized as indecisive due to their attraction to both men and women. As the term bisexual can refer to people who do have a sexual preference but are open to sexual interactions with other groups, bisexuals are sometimes seen as unwilling to commit to one sexual identity. This characterization can include stereotypes originating in the LGBT community itself as people who are bisexual do not always choose homosexual partners—they are often seen as being in a transitory or experimental phase between being heterosexual and homosexual.

=== Promiscuity ===
Another common stereotype is that bisexual people are promiscuous and incapable of having steady or long-term relationships. This includes belief that, according to a bisexuality study, "compared to lesbians or gay targets, bisexual targets in a relationship with lesbian or gay partners were evaluated as more likely to transmit STDs and less likely to sexually satisfy their partners" by the public. Bisexual people are sometimes seen as being incapable of monogamy or sexually manipulative. Bisexual people are also assumed to want to engage in threesomes.

=== Disaster bisexual ===
The "disaster bisexual" stereotype, also called "chaotic bisexual", characterizes bisexual people as having chaotic, goofy, or socially awkward personalities. According to Den of Geek, disaster bisexuals have such chaotic personalities that "without knowing anything else about them you could correctly guess that they're bi", and they are "a hot mess above all else". According to Autostraddle, the term originated on Tumblr. According to The Routledge Handbook of Queer Rhetoric, the term is used by some bisexuals aiming to reclaim stereotypes that they are confused, promiscuous, or overwhelmed by their attractions. S.E. Fleenor described the term as being a self-effacing way for bisexuals to describe themselves as fun and messy. Aspects associated with the disaster bisexual stereotype include "not being able to sit in chairs 'properly'", "the overuse of finger guns", and "unseasonably cuffed jeans".

The stereotype of the disaster bisexual has been used in media. Fictional characters that have been described by fans as disaster bisexuals have included Harley Quinn from the DC Extended Universe, Loki from the Marvel Cinematic Universe, and Motoko Kusanagi from Ghost in the Shell.

=== Media representation ===
Due to negative characterizations of bisexuality, media personalities are often reluctant to share their identity with the public, leading to reduced visibility. Rock musician David Bowie famously declared himself bisexual in an interview with Melody Maker in January 1972, a move coinciding with the first shots in his campaign for stardom as Ziggy Stardust. Bowie later regretted revealing his sexuality, stating, "I had no problem with people knowing I was bisexual. But I had no inclination to hold any banners or be a representative of any group of people. I knew what I wanted to be, which was a songwriter and a performer ... "

Regarding the portrayal of bisexual people by Hollywood, stigma is present, especially for men. From the end of the McCarthy era to today, "The history of male bisexual characters in film has been one of negative stereotyping."

== Gay men ==
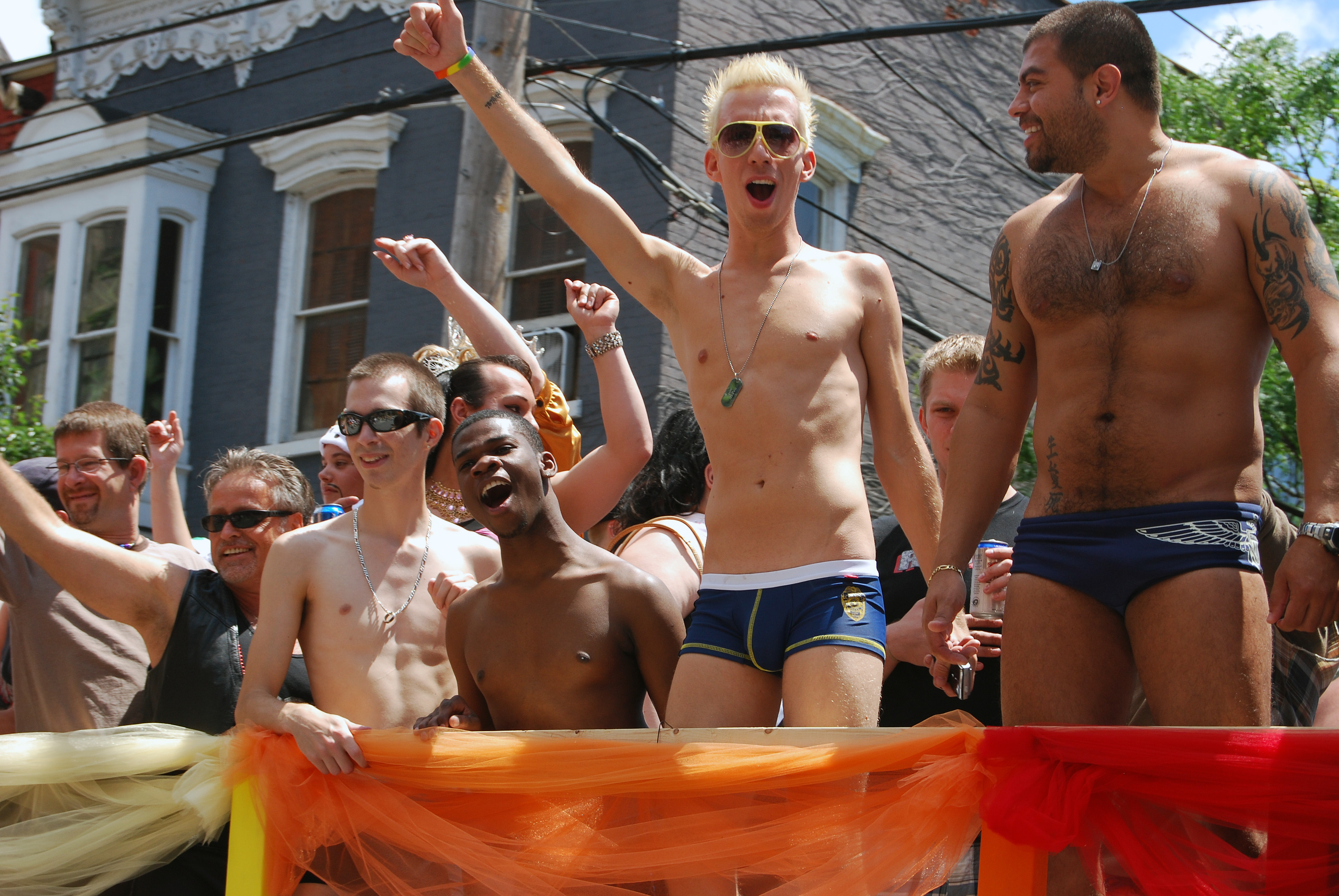
The contrast between a twink and a bear can be seen in this group of men in the Capital Gay Pride parade in Albany, New York in June 2009. The young blond (center), Naked Boy News host J.Son Dinant, is generally considered twink-ish because of his slender build and overall youthful appearance, while the man on the right, porn star Manuel Torres, would generally be considered a bear because of his stocky build and body hair.

Gay men are often equated interchangeably with heterosexual women by the heterocentric mainstream and are frequently stereotyped as being effeminate, despite the fact that gender expression, gender identity, and sexual orientation are widely accepted to be distinct from each other. The "flaming queen" is a characterization that melds flamboyance and effeminacy, remaining a gay male stock character in Hollywood. Theatre, specifically Broadway musicals, is a component of another stereotype, the "show queen", which generalizes that gay men are involved with the performing arts, and are theatrical, overly dramatic, and camp. Gay men are also perceived as being artistic.

The bear subculture of the LGBT community is composed of generally large, hairy men, referred to as bears.

=== Appearance and mannerisms ===
Gay men are often stereotyped as speaking with a lisp or a feminine tone. Fashion and effeminacy have long been seen as stereotypes of homosexuality. They are often based on the visibility of the reciprocal relationship between gay men and fashion. Designers, including Dolce & Gabbana, have made use of homoerotic imagery in their advertising. Some commentators argue this encourages the stereotype that most gay men enjoy shopping. A limp wrist is also a mannerism associated with gay men.

Recent research by Cox and colleagues demonstrated that "gaydar" is often used as an alternate label for using stereotypes, especially those related to appearance and mannerisms, to infer orientation.

=== Sex and relationships ===
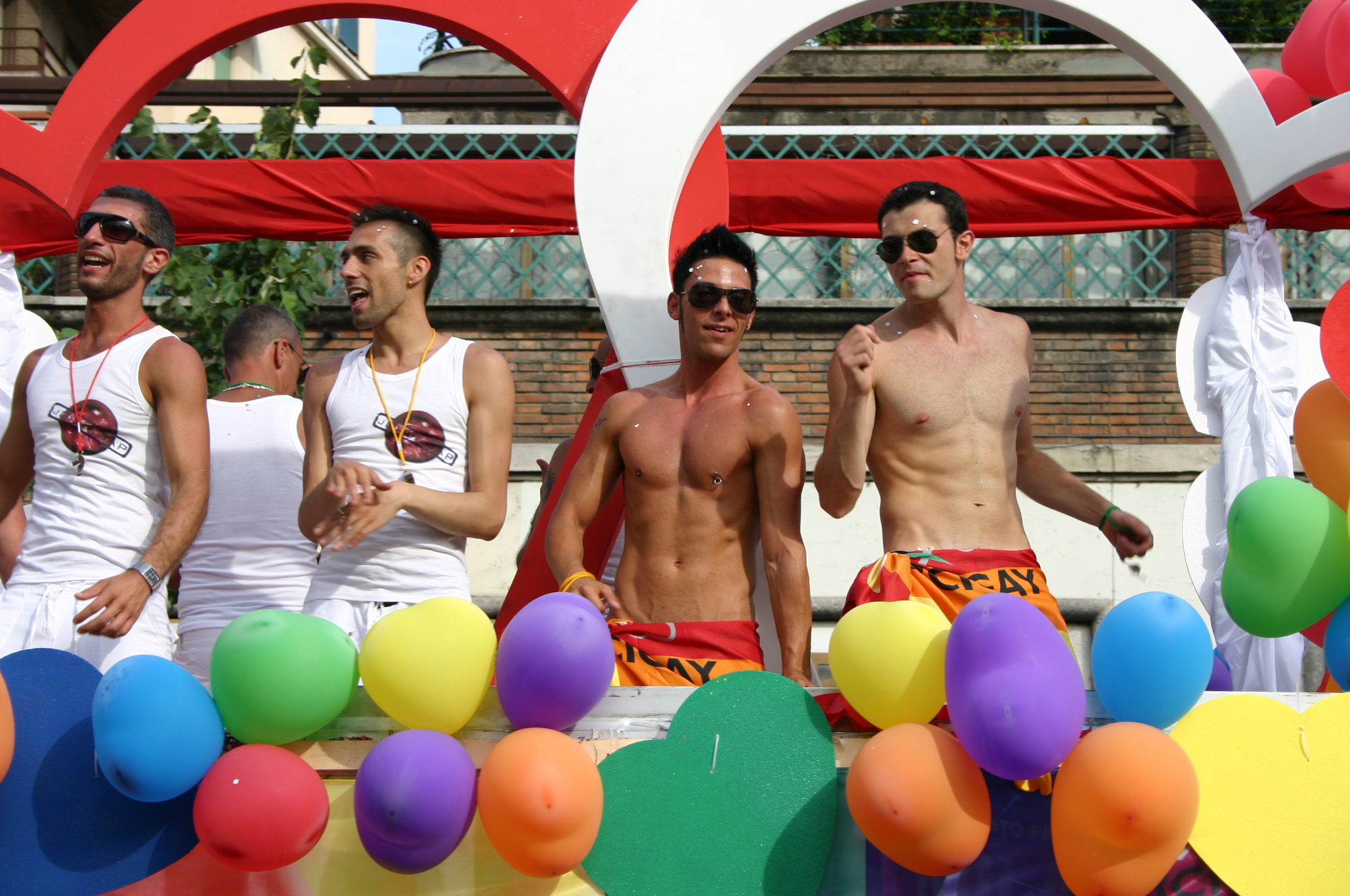
Gay men on a pride parade float in Rome

Gay men are often stereotyped as hypersexualized and unable to maintain committed or fulfilling relationships, though research suggests that their relationships are just as fulfilling as those of other couples. Research suggests that lesbians may be slightly more likely than gay men to be in steady relationships. In terms of unprotected sex, a 2007 study cited two large population surveys as showing that "the majority of gay men had similar numbers of unprotected sexual partners annually as straight men and women". Another study found that gay men sometimes faced social boundaries because of this stereotype. Participants in the study reported finding it difficult to befriend other gay men on a platonic basis. The study found that when they would engage with other gay men there would be an assumption of sexual motivations, and when it became clear that this was not the case the other men would not be interested in continuing socialising. These stereotypes permeate throughout all facets of society, even influencing those subjected to it.

Another persistent stereotype associated with the gay male community is excessive partying. Before the Stonewall riots in 1969, most LGBT people were extremely private and closeted, and house parties, bars, and taverns became some of the few places where they could meet, socialize, and feel safe. The riots represented the start of the modern LGBT social movement and acceptance of sexual and gender minorities, which has steadily increased since. Festive and party-like social occasions remain at the core of organizing and fundraising in the LGBT community. In cities where there are large populations of LGBT people, benefits and bar fundraisers are still common, and alcohol companies invest heavily in LGBT-oriented marketing. Ushered in by underground gay clubs and disc jockeys, the disco era kept the "partying" aspect vibrant and ushered in the more hardcore circuit party movement, hedonistic and associated with party and play.

The relationship between gay men and female heterosexual "fag hags" has become highly stereotypical. The accepted behaviors in this type of relationship can predominantly include physical affections (such as kissing and touching), as in the sitcom Will & Grace.

Film scholar Robin Wood called David Lynch's Dune (1984) "the most obscenely homophobic film I have ever seen" – referring to a scene in which Baron Harkonnen sexually assaults and kills a young man by bleeding him to death – charging it with "managing to associate with homosexuality in a single scene physical grossness, moral depravity, violence, and disease." Gay writer Dennis Altman suggested that the film showed how "AIDS references began penetrating popular culture" in the 1980s, asking, "Was it just an accident that in the film Dune the homosexual villain had suppurating sores on his face?"

=== Sex and drugs ===
The term party and play (PNP) is used to refer to a subculture of gay men who use recreational drugs and have sex together, either one-on-one or in groups. The drug chosen is typically methamphetamine, known as crystal or tina in the gay community. Other "party drugs" such as MDMA and GHB are less associated with this term. While PNP probably had its genesis in the distinct subculture of methamphetamine users, and is most associated with its use, it has become somewhat generalized to include partying with other drugs thought to enhance sexual experiences, especially MDMA, GHB, and cocaine.

A report from the National HIV Prevention Conference (a collaborative effort by the U.S. Centers for Disease Control and Prevention and other governmental and non-government organizations) describes PNP as "sexual behavior under the influence of crystal meth or other 'party' drugs." It has been referred to as both an "epidemic" and a "plague" in the gay community. A meta-analysis of studies between 1996 and 2012 found that "some studies report that gay men are more likely to use alcohol and illicit drugs than heterosexual men, while other studies report that gay and heterosexual men do not differ in alcohol and illicit drug use, alcohol-related problems, or treatment utilization, and still other studies report that gay men in college are less likely to binge drink than their heterosexual counterparts." Research on the minority stress model shows stigma toward gay men may contribute to elevated substance use. Representatives for Drugscope state that methamphetamine use is relatively unknown in the UK outside this PNP subculture, and it largely occurs in the heavy-end party scene.

=== Pedophilia and predation ===
It is a common stereotype that gay men are sexual predators or pedophiles. The former perception can lead to a knee-jerk reaction that created the "gay panic defense", usually in straight men, who fear being hit on by gay men, and can be either a cause or an expression of homophobia.

The perception that a greater proportion of gay than straight men are pedophiles or child sexual abusers is one contributing factor of discrimination against gay teachers, despite the stark contrast to statistical figures, which have generally revealed most male child sexual abusers, including those who target boys, are heterosexual and usually married with children of their own, and research on child sexual abuse shows that most instances of child sexual abuse (one cited percentage being over 90%) are perpetrated by heterosexual males raping underage females.

== Lesbians ==
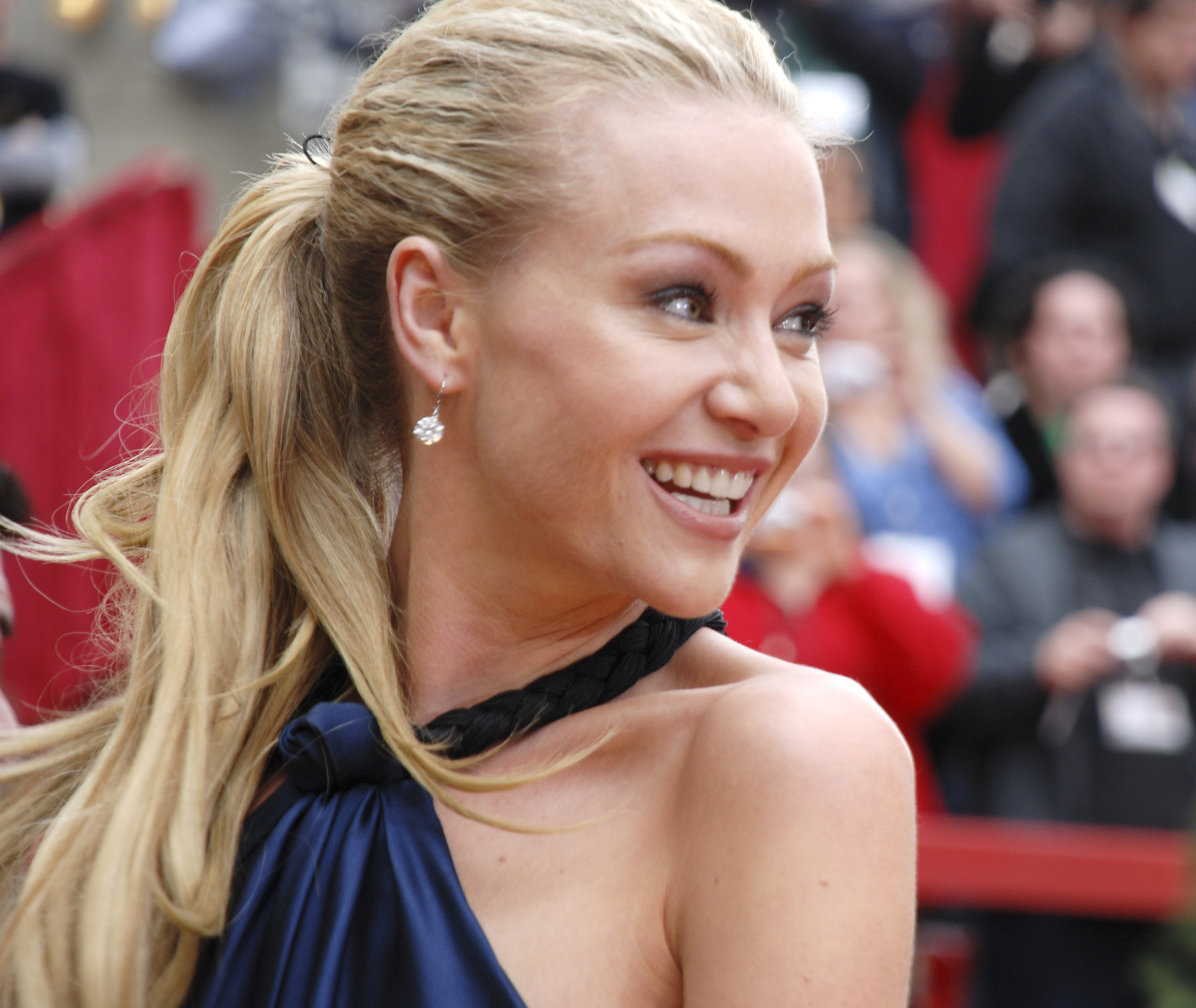
Actress Portia de Rossi came out as a lesbian in the early 2000s.

Many 20th-century films put a negative connotation on the lesbian community. The 1961 drama The Children's Hour gives viewers the idea that lesbians live a "dark" and almost depressing lifestyle.

The television series The L Word portrays a long-term lesbian couple attempting to start a family, and counters the negative "U-Haul" lesbian stereotype, which is that lesbians move in on the second date. However, at the same time, the series came under heavy criticism for reinforcing numerous other negative stereotypes, such as lesbians preying on and seducing straight women in relationships with men; mistreating bisexual women or outright shunning them if they had a history of sleeping with men (to the point where Alice Pieszecki, a bisexual character, refers to bisexuality as "gross"); for downplaying the main characters' misdeeds and unexplained tendency for adultery and instead focusing on their physical beauty and sex scenes; for randomly killing off main characters for no specific reason (referred to as "bury your gays"); for downplaying a rape scene as "angry sex"; reportedly attempting to "reify heteronormativity"; for depicting lesbianism or bisexuality as a gene passed from mothers to daughters which sometimes caused both to fight over the same woman (as demonstrated in the cases of Lenore and Alice Pieszecki, Cherie and Clea Jaffe, Peggy and Helena Peabody, Phyllis and Molly Kroll, an instance when Shane had sex with a mother and her two daughters separately on one of the daughters' wedding day, which led to all three of them falling in love with Shane and subsequently falling out with each other, and ultimately Tina and Angelica Kennard in the sequel series, The L Word: Generation Q); and showing lesbian relationships as destined to fail due to lesbians' apparent struggles with monogamy and commitment. Series creator Ilene Chaiken was labeled as "shameless in her professional upbringing" for her depiction of lesbians in general.

Many lesbians are associated with short hair, wearing baggy clothes and playing sports. Further, news coverage of LGBT issues reinforces stereotyped portrayals of lesbians. Often news broadcasts highlight stories on more "masculine" lesbians and fail to give equal coverage to other more faceted lesbian identities. Thus, the populations who receive information about marginalized communities from a news source begin to equate lesbian sexuality with a masculine presentation. The way lesbians are portrayed leads people to make assumptions about individuals in everyday life.

Typically, lesbians are stereotyped as belonging to one of the two following categories: "butch and femme". Butch lesbians dress in a more masculine manner than other women. "Dykes" (a pejorative term that the Lesbian community has reclaimed, to an extent) are considered members of a community that is perceived as being composed of strong and outspoken advocates in wider society. Actress Portia de Rossi has been credited for significantly countering the general societal misconception of how lesbians look and function when, in 2005, she divulged her sexual orientation in intimate interviews with Details and The Advocate which generated further discussion on the concept of the "lipstick lesbian" ("femme" women who tend to be "hyper-feminine"). These stereotypes play out within the LGBTIQ+ community itself, with many women reporting feeling rejected by the queer community for not appearing or acting in the accepted way.

Lesbian feminists assert that a sexual component is unnecessary for a woman to declare herself a lesbian if her primary and closest relationships are with women, on the basis that, when considering past relationships within an appropriate historical context, there were times when love and sex were separate and unrelated notions. In 1989, an academic cohort called the Lesbian History Group wrote:

"Because of society's reluctance to admit that lesbians exist, a high degree of certainty is expected before historians or biographers are allowed to use the label. Evidence that would suffice in any other situation is inadequate here... A woman who never married, who lived with another woman, whose friends were mostly women, or who moved in known lesbian or mixed gay circles, may well have been a lesbian. ... But this sort of evidence is not 'proof'. What our critics want is incontrovertible evidence of sexual activity between women. This is almost impossible to find."

== Transgender people ==
Transgender is an umbrella term that encompasses a wide range of people with more specific identities. In general, a person who is transgender identifies with a gender other than their gender assigned at birth. The term may apply to any number of distinct communities, such as cross-dressers, drag queens, and drag kings, in addition to transsexuals. The beliefs that transgender people are all prostitutes and caricatures of men and women are two of many erroneous misconceptions.

One common stereotype of trans women is that they are assumed to be drag queens. While historically some trans women have been innovators within the drag scene alongside gay men, trans women are not drag queens.

Another stereotype is that trans women are sexual predators seeking to assault cis women, analogous to the stereotype about gay men as sexual predators on boys; even though most sexual assault victims, women and boys, are assaulted by cisgender heterosexual male perpetrators.

=== Transsexualism ===
A transsexual person is born with the physical characteristics of one sex who psychologically and emotionally identifies with a variant or different gender than their physical sex characteristics. Stereotypes of trans women include them always being taller and having larger hands than cisgender women. Trans men, conversely, are often stereotyped as being cuter, more feminine, and more passive than their cisgender counterparts, being classified as "softboys" (also spelled "softbois" or "softybois"). Both transgender men and women are often conflated with being gay, with trans men being mistaken for lesbians and trans women being mistaken for gay men.

=== Transvestites and cross-dressers ===
Transvestites are often assumed to be homosexuals. The word transvestism comes from the combination of Latin words trans meaning "across, over" and vestitus meaning dressed. Most transvestites are heterosexual. Although many people use the words interchangeably, transvestite has increasingly become a derogatory term. Most prefer to use the term cross-dresser or cross-dressing.

== Origins and prevalence ==
=== Research ===
Social scientists have attempted to understand why there are such negative connotations associated with the lesbian community. William James assumed that it was a repulsive instinct that came naturally to each woman and that, when an individual enjoyed same-sex interaction, it was because it became a habit. In short, he assumed that "tolerance is learned and revulsion is inborn" (PBS). In 1908, James and Edward Westermack attempted to understand the violent actions taken toward homosexuals by Jewish, Christian, and Zoroastrian religions. They believed hostility existed because of the historical association between homosexuality and idolatry, heresy, and criminal behavior. Sigmund Freud asserted in 1905 that homophobia was shaped by society, an individual's environment, and the individual's exposure to homo-eroticism. Sandor Ference (1914) believed that heterosexual women's feelings of repulsion toward those identifying as lesbians was a reaction formation and defense mechanism against affection from the same sex. In other words, he believed heterosexual females feared being labeled as lesbians.

Taking an individual that adheres to stereotypes of LGBT people and putting them in face-to-face interaction with those of the LGBT community tends to lessen tendencies to rely upon stereotypes and increases the presence of individuals with a similar ethnic, religious, or geographical background, and who are accepting of homosexuals.

=== Intersections between LGBT, race, and class stereotypes ===
According to the theory of intersectionality, discrimination leveled against an individual can compound based on several factors, including race, class, gender, and sexuality. As members of the LGBT community can be members of other minority groups and stand at all ends of the socioeconomic spectrum, intersectional stereotypes are often perpetuated, including those related to class and race.

As people of color and those of lower socioeconomic status are more likely to go to prison, LGBT members of these groups are often misrepresented as being criminally inclined. LGBT individuals often face discrimination in prisons as they are typically gender-segregated and are stereotyped as being sexually available to other prisoners. This makes them vulnerable to assault and discrimination both behind bars and in the outside world. Shows like Orange is the New Black and other forms of media perpetuate stereotypes of LGBT expression within prisons.

==== African Americans ====
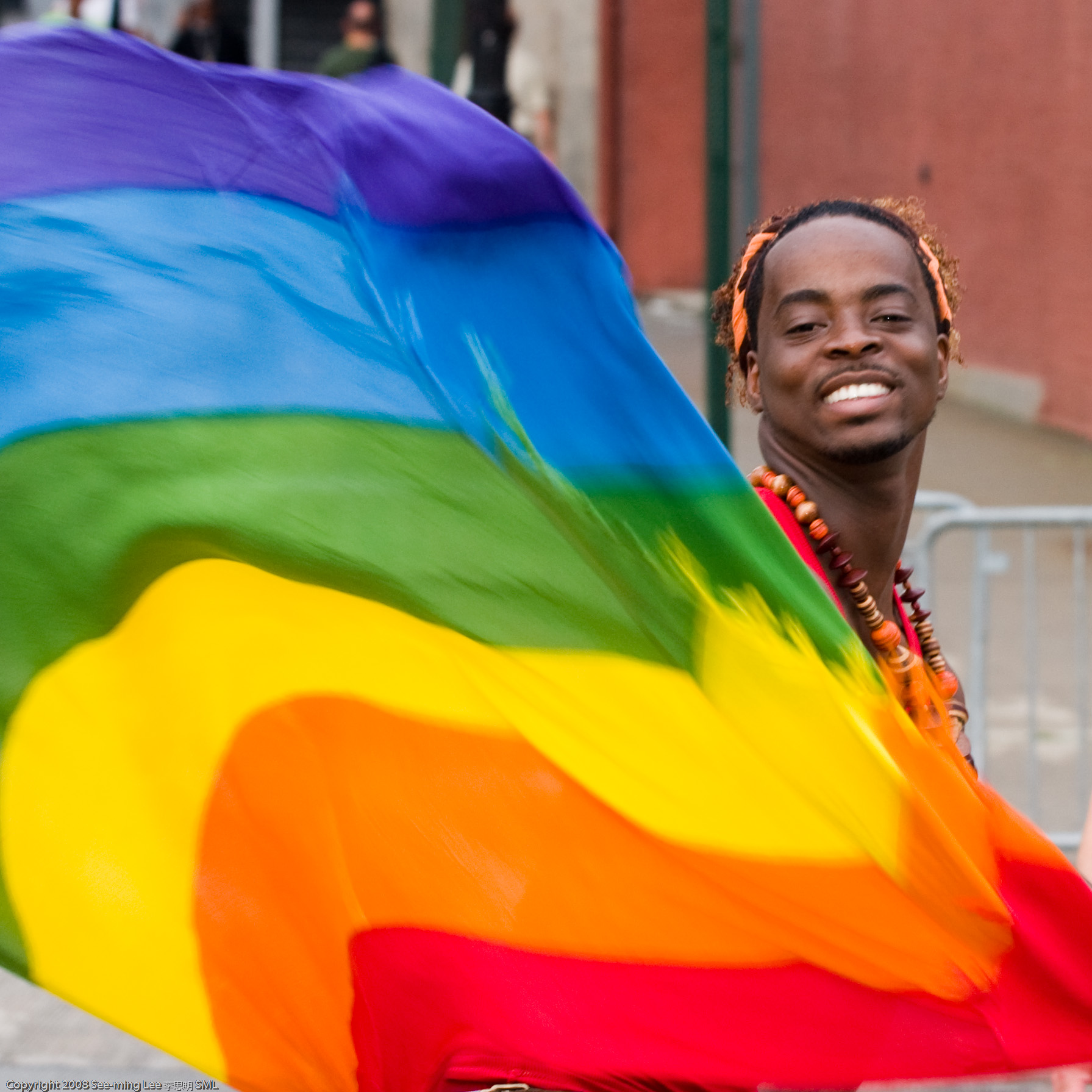
African Americans represent a particularly marginalized segment of the LGBT community which faces both race- and sexuality-based prejudice.

African American gay men are often characterized as being dominant in relationships both sexually and emotionally. This belief is rooted in the Mandingo stereotype, a popular stereotype among opponents of the Emancipation Proclamation that painted African American men as animalistic and brutish to deepen the existing divide between White and Black Americans. In addition to traditional forms of racism, African American gay men are subject to sexual racism that expects them to assume the "top" role during anal sex due to stereotypes that depict them as sexually aggressive partners with large penises. These stereotypes can be observed in many forms of media, notably pornography, which depicts Black gay men as sexual predators who are capable of satisfying fantasies of extreme domination. African American members of the LGBT community also face discrimination and stereotypes from other African Americans who are historically likely to be religious and stereotype homosexuals as having loose morals. Religious stereotypes surrounding the LGBT community are especially prevalent in certain black evangelical churches, where LGBT members are thought to be "damned to hell."

With respect to the experience of African American lesbians, they deliberately construct their identities to protect themselves against intersectional forms of discrimination. Though Black feminine and masculine lesbians–femmes and studs–use gender performance to blend into a heteropatriarchal society, they continue to experience negative gender and racial stereotypes.

Black femmes are characterized as hypersexual, submissive women who lack substance and, in conformity with traditional feminine gender norms, are obsessed with outward appearance (i.e., clothes, hair, makeup). As their visual identity allows them to pass as heterosexual women, Black femmes are shielded from potential homophobic violence. However, due to their subordinate position in the dominant racial and gender hierarchy, Black women remain vulnerable to misogynoir–regardless of perceived or actual sexual orientation.

Studs are similarly identified through dress and appearance. In an attempt to imitate straight, Black men, studs incorporate stereotypical elements of "thuggish" style into their own, often covered in loose-fitting clothing and chains with their hair styled in braids, twists, tied up, or cut short. To protect themselves against homophobia within Black and non-Black communities further, studs will exaggerate certain elements of traditional masculinity to become "one of the guys." As a result, studs are stereotyped as having extremely sexist and homophobic attitudes towards feminine lesbians and gay men.

However, deviation from heteronormativity has contributed to the rise of negative representations of all Black lesbians in media and popular culture. In the 1920s, African American newspapers popularized the stereotype of Black lesbians as violent, sex-crazed individuals at the same time that the concept of "lesbianism" emerged in modern American society. Largely owing to the Great Migration, newspapers sensationalized homicide cases involving women who loved women to criticize the immoral behavior of Southern migrants, who were perceived as a threat to the respectability of Northern residents. While violence between Black women occurred at a lower rate than violence between heterosexual and other same-sex relationships during this time period, journalists' insinuation that Black lesbianism was inherently linked to extreme aggression and criminal behavior shaped public opinion for several decades.

==== Hispanics and Latinos ====
Hispanic and Latino gay men and women often experience difficulty coming out in their communities due to cultural values based on heterosexism or the presumption that heterosexual relationships and sexual behavior are the societal norm. As a result, coming out as homosexual may jeopardize the strong familial ties associated with Hispanic and Latino culture. A dominant stereotype of Hispanic and Latino family structures is that they are centered on the "macho" man who determines appropriate forms of masculinity and femininity. A "good man," for example, is not only expected to provide for his family and protect women and children, but also to maintain a positive family image through abusive and oppressive tactics. As such, a "good woman" is expected to assume a submissive and subservient position to both men and the family. Due to their sexuality, gay men and women are perceived to be at odds with traditional Hispanic and Latino structures that assign gender roles and are discriminated against as a result. In addition to machismo, Hispanic and Latino communities are stereotyped as homophobic due to their religiosity. However, the emerging popularity of Latin American Liberation Theology has empowered young gay men and women to redefine religion and spirituality on their own terms, come out, and confront heterosexism.

Like other gay men of color, Hispanic and Latino gay men are frequently reduced to racial stereotypes within the gay community. Due to the overgeneralization of Hispanic and Latino men as hyper-masculine individuals, gay men of the same background are stereotyped as passionate and spontaneous lovers with an insatiable sexual appetite. The continued presence of racial stereotypes within the gay community is harmful because it fetishizes and dehumanizes gay men of color to the point where issues impacting their intersecting identities—such as universal healthcare, homelessness, welfare, and immigration—are excluded from the political agenda of the gay movement. Additionally, Hispanic and Latino gay men are subject to gender stereotypes within their ethnic community that largely influence their sexual behavior. As gay men in Hispanic and Latino cultures are stereotyped as overly effeminate individuals due to their sexual orientation, their preferences in sexual roles are formed and reformed to prevent any negative perceptions of them being a "lesser man." They prefer to assume the active role during anal sex over the passive role because penetration is associated with traditionally masculine traits such as power and dominance while being penetrated is associated with traditionally feminine traits such as weakness and submission.

Hispanic and Latina lesbians are similarly stereotyped according to their intersecting identities. As gay women of color, they are characterized as seductive and sensual individuals with a fiery or "spicy" disposition who exist to satisfy heterosexual male desire. One example of the stereotypical representation of Hispanic and Latina lesbians in popular culture is the fictional character Santana Lopez from Glee. Throughout the series, Santana is depicted as a "straight-up bitch" who engages in verbal and physical altercations with others and has had numerous sexual and romantic relationships with male and female protagonists. Within their communities, Hispanic and Latina lesbians are also impacted by gender stereotypes. Owing to the cultural belief that respectable women subordinate their needs to men and refrain from any sexual activity without the intention of procreation, Hispanic and Latina lesbians will "stay in the closet" or refrain from coming out. Those who do come out will be received differently depending on their presentation. While feminine lesbians will be rendered invisible in Hispanic and Latino spaces, masculine lesbians will be the only "type" of lesbian to be recognized and, as a result, are more likely to be disowned by their families and shut out from communities.

==== Asians ====
As a marginalized minority within gender and racial hierarchies, Asian members of the LGBT community experience intersectional invisibility. While this form of invisibility may offer a certain degree of protection from active prejudice, it also makes it difficult for the negative experiences of the Asian community—such as racism and discrimination—to be recognized. As a result, Asians are frequently excluded from discussions of race, which are generally framed around a White/Black dichotomy, and marginalized within the mostly-white LGBT community and movement at large.

On the basis of sexual orientation and race, gay Asian men are categorized as either hypersexual or asexual individuals. In particular, gay and bisexual Asian men are stereotyped as "effeminate, submissive, and docile." Due to their perceived feminine qualities, Asian men are viewed as mere bodies to be dominated by other gay men, primarily white men. The stereotype of the submissive and feminine Asian man is reinforced by additional stereotypes, such as the expectation that they will not only assume the passive role in anal sex or be the "bottom," but also that they will do this because of the myth/stereotype that they have small penises.

Asian women who identify as lesbian or bisexual endure sexual fetishization by those with yellow fever, a derogatory term with racist origins that is used to describe an Asian fetish. They are stereotyped as "spicy" and "freaky," which contributes to Asian lesbians' frustration about not being taken seriously by society. Stereotypes of Asian women as either a Dragon Lady or China doll are dominant in mainstream media representation of Asian women, and butch Asian women are relatively invisible, giving way to more femme, or feminized, depictions.

GLAAD is working to have a fair depiction of the Asian community in the media by educating the public on language referring to Asian Americans, including refraining from phrases that are Eurocentric like "The Orient", "Far East", and "Asiatic", among other measures. GLAAD is also working to connect media networks with Asian and Pacific Islander LGBT leaders and organizations in order to create less biased media coverage.

===== Japanese =====
In Japan, adult lesbians are frequently portrayed as smokers in Japanese media. While Japanese culture heavily discourages interest in homosexual fiction matching the reader's sex, certain publications, such as manga magazine Yuri Hime, have repeatedly reported their dominant consumers as the same gender as portrayed for most of their operational life.

== See also ==
- Anti-LGBT rhetoric
- Fetishization of LGBTQ people
- Heteronormativity
- Homophobic propaganda
- Stereotypes of African Americans
- Stereotypes of Americans
- Stereotypes of Jews
- Blonde stereotype
