= Butch (lesbian slang) =

Slang for lesbians with masculine traits

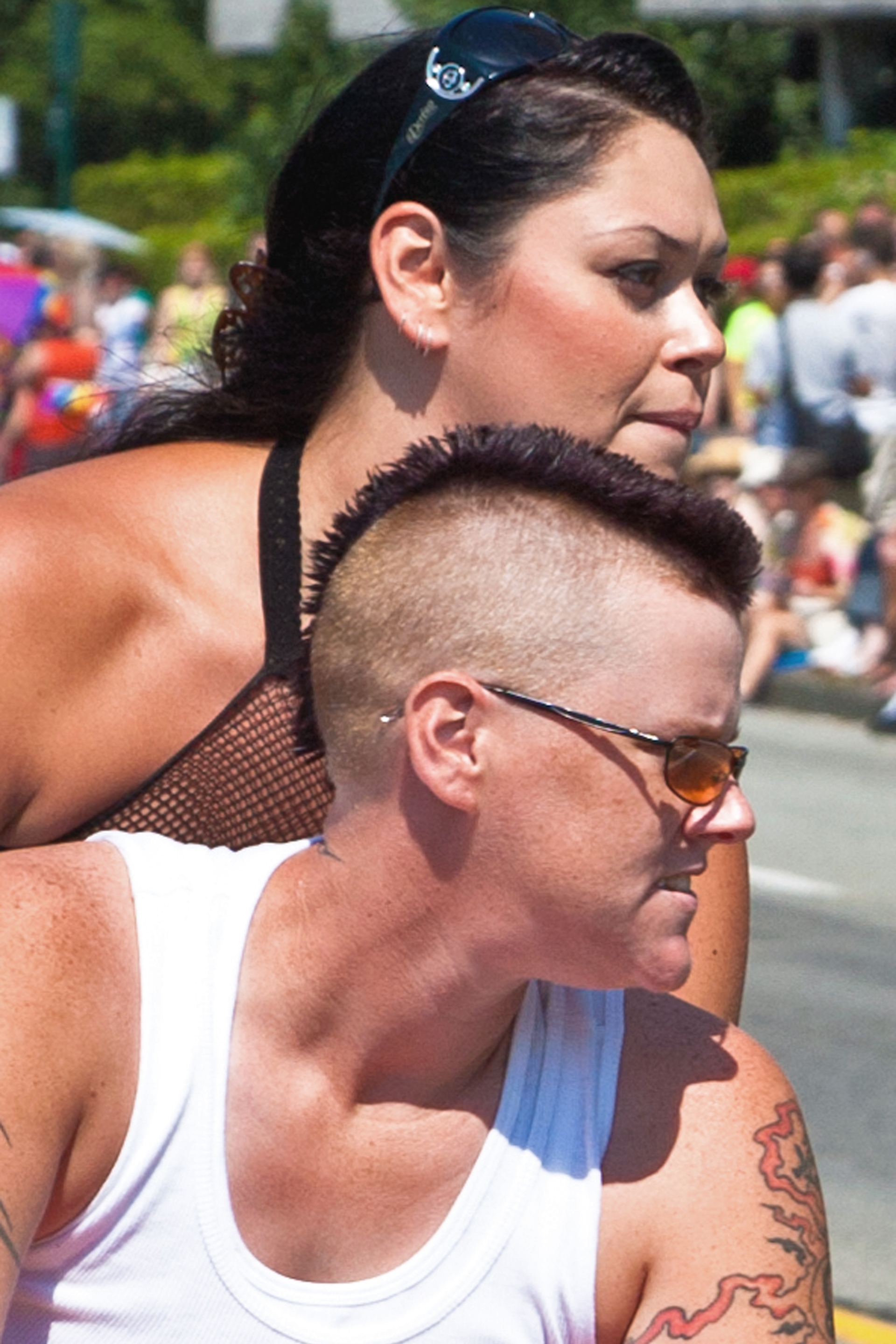
Woman with a butch haircut, 2009 Vancouver pride parade

A butch is a lesbian who exhibits a masculine or non-feminine identity or gender presentation. Although the term originated in the lesbian community, it is also used by persons who identify as queer in the larger LGBTQIA+ community today.

Since the lesbian subculture of 1940s America, "butch" has been present as a way for lesbians to circumvent traditional gender roles of women in society and distinguish their masculine or non-feminine attributes and characteristics from feminine women. (Note: According to Heidi M. Levitt and Sara K. Bridges: "The terms femme and butch began infiltrating bisexual communities, and women began writing about their experiences as bisexual femmes...Although essayists have begun to explore this identity, very little empirical research has been conducted looking at the expression and experience of gender expression and gender identity within bisexual women." According to some academic studies about the butch/femme subculture, "Femmes were sometimes bisexual.") Butch is often understood as the counterpart to femme, with the two forming butch–femme dynamics, although butch–butch relationships are common as well.

== History ==
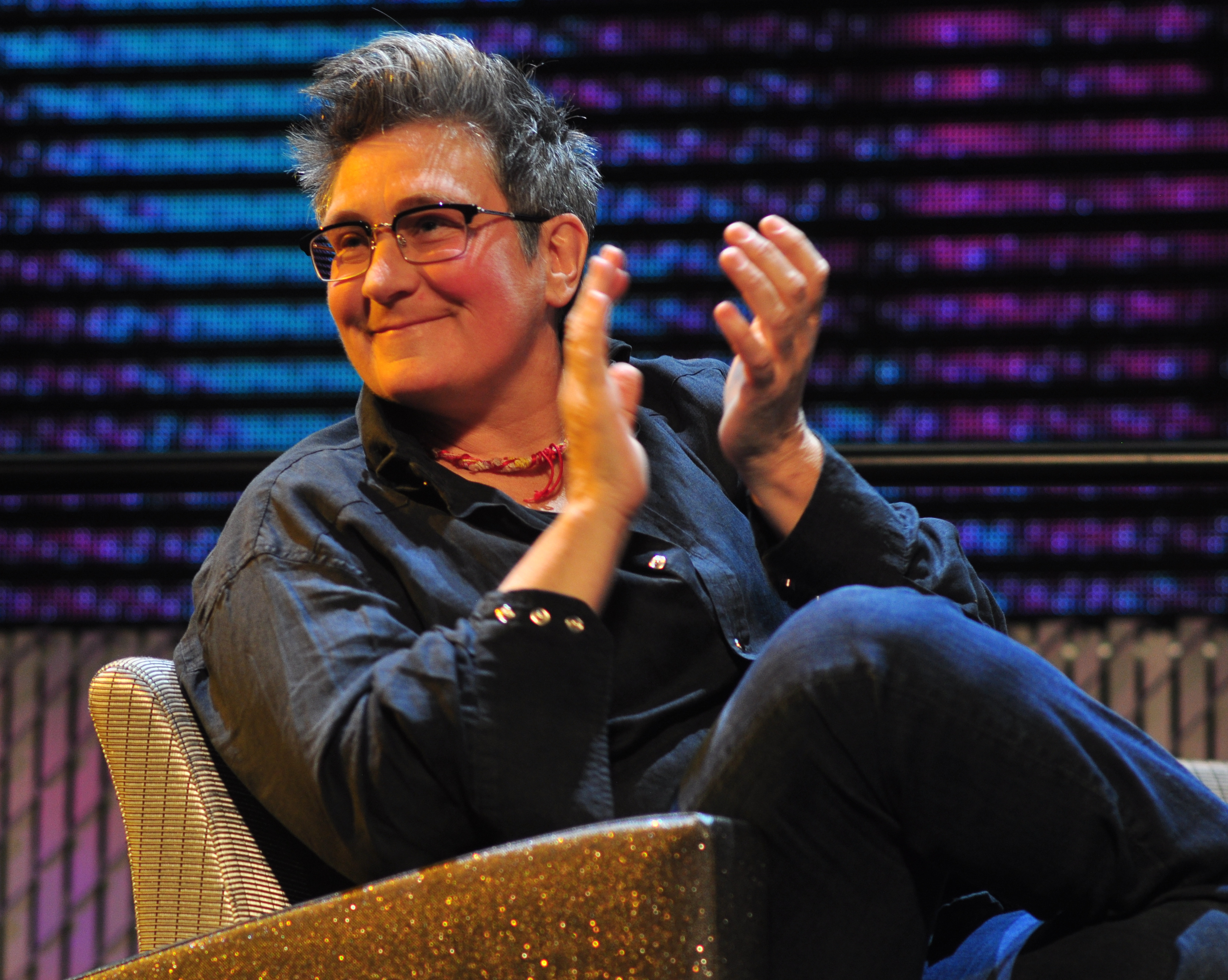
k.d. lang, a butch lesbian and butch activist.

Starting in the 1940s and 1950s, butch became a central identity in the lesbian community. It was often understood in conjunction with femme identity, and butch–femme relations have been studied at great length. As a result, butch identity on its own remains somewhat ill-defined. Butch people are often described as sexually dominant lesbians who are interested in having sex with femmes. The Queen's Vernacular claimed a butch was "a lesbian with masculine characteristics." In Of Catamites and Kings, Gayle Rubin describes a butch as those lesbians who use masculine mannerisms, and/or who wear traditionally male clothing, and/or who experience gender dysphoria. The defining characteristic that most scholars agree on is that butch people are lesbians who are to some degree aligned with masculine traits.

During the mid-20th century, butch people in the U.S. were usually limited to a few jobs, such as factory work and cab driving, that had no dress codes for women. World War II was an event that began to help normalize the role of the working woman in the U.S, beginning in the 1940s. Since many men went off to go fight, women were encouraged to enter labor roles which were once primarily fulfilled by men to sustain the war effort. Women who opted to participate in the workforce had to dress accordingly to work properly, therefore causing it to be more socially acceptable when women would wear traditional men's clothing. This event allowed for more flexibility in what kind of clothing women were expected to wear, giving butch individuals a socially acceptable avenue to presenting themselves in a masculine fashion. During the 1950s, with the anti-gay politics of the McCarthy era and the Lavender Scare, homophobic violence was common, especially through raids on gay and lesbian bars. Although femmes also fought back, it became primarily the role of butches to defend against attacks and hold the bars as gay women's space. The prevailing butch image was severe but gentle, while it became increasingly tough and aggressive as violent confrontation became a fact of life. Black lesbians, especially vulnerable to police brutality and racial segregation, often socialised in private parties instead of bars, and often dressed formally, compared to the typical working-class attire of T-shirts and jeans that white butches adopted. Leslie Feinberg's novel Stone Butch Blues is a predominant piece of butch literature, and offers a window into butch bar culture, police brutality towards transvestites (both drag queens and butch people), and butch eroticism in the 1970s.

== Transgender butch identity ==
The butch identity can include people who experience gender dysphoria, and people who are nonbinary and/or transgender, including transgender women. Some butches pursue social and/or medical transition. In the mid 20th century, butch was a group that included most lesbians who identified with masculine characteristics, and this was a space that included many transmasculine identities.

Interpretations of the relationship between butch and FTM (female-to-male) identities vary; Gayle Rubin writes that "the boundaries between the categories of butch and transsexual are permeable". Many transgender men identify as butch prior to transitioning and still want to maintain their connections to lesbian communities after transitioning. According to butch, transgender man S. Bear Bergman, "butch and transgender are the same thing with different names, except that butch is not a trans identity, unless it is." Butch scholar Jack Halberstam describes a "border war" between butch and FTM identities. Halberstam argues that in "making concrete distinctions between butch women and transsexual males, all too often such distinctions serve the cause of heteronormativity."

== See also ==
- Boi (slang)
- Butch is Not a Dirty Word
- Daddy (slang)
- Dyke (slang)
- Soft butch
- Stone butch
- Stud
