= Stone butch =

Masculine lesbian

A stone butch is a lesbian who displays female butchness or traditional "masculinity" and who does not allow their genitals to be touched during sexual activity, as opposed to a stone femme.

== Etymology and history ==
The term stone butch was popularized by Leslie Feinberg's 1993 novel Stone Butch Blues, which describes the protagonist's explorations of the lesbian community. A large segment is devoted to the tribulations of being a stone butch person, and the experience of being a lesbian while identifying with masculine traits.

Bonnie Zimmerman documents a use of the term to refer to a lesbian who "does not allow herself to be touched during lovemaking", but may experience vicarious sexual pleasure from her partner's enjoyment. Zimmerman notes that this may have been particularly prevalent in the 1940s and 1950s.

== Social role ==
The term stone butch has also been used in reference to a subculture or set of mannerisms, as opposed to a statement about sexual behaviour. In this context, 'stone butch' can describe the opposite of 'femme' or 'high femme' attributes, although an individual can identify with both categories.

Stone butch identities can overlap with non-binary gender identities and transgender masculine identities among lesbians. The sociologist Sara Crawley has written that, while stone butch and masculine transgender identities may share significant characteristics, the primary distinction between the two is that lesbian self-identification prioritizes communicating one's identity to a specifically lesbian audience, whereas transgender masculine self-identification does not. Similarly, Jack Halberstam has contextualised stone butch identities as one of many distinct female masculinities.

== See also ==
- Butch and femme
- Soft butch
