= Soft butch =

Lesbian slang term

A soft butch, or stem (stud-fem), is a lesbian who exhibits some stereotypical butch traits without fitting the masculine stereotype associated with butch lesbians. Soft butch is on the spectrum of butch, as are stone butch and masculine, whereas on the contrary, ultra fem, high femme, and lipstick lesbian are some labels on the spectrum of lesbians with a more prominent expression of femininity, also known as femmes. Soft butches have gender expressions of women, but primarily display masculine characteristics; soft butches predominantly express masculinity with a touch of femininity.

The "hardness", or label depicting one's level of masculine expression as a butch is dependent upon the fluidity of her gender expression. Soft butches might want to express themselves through their clothing and hairstyle in a more masculine way, but their behavior in a more traditionally feminine way. For example, these traits of a soft butch may or may not include short hair, clothing that was designed for men, and masculine mannerisms and behaviors. Soft butches generally appear androgynous, rather than adhering to strictly feminine or masculine norms. Soft butches generally physically, sexually, and romantically express themselves in more masculine than feminine ways in the majority of those categories.

In addition to a soft butch's gender expression through her outward appearance, she also has a distinctive way of sexually expressing herself. Soft butch women might want to have a more passive role sexually or romantically in their relationships, which is generally associated with feminine sexual behavior. This is an example of how a soft butch's sexuality and outward appearance are not completely masculine, but have some feminine traits. This desire to express both masculinity and femininity through one's gender and sexuality is clearly seen in soft butch women, but also across many people of a variety of sexual orientations.

== See also ==
- Drag king
- Stone butch
- Stone femme
- Tomboy
