= Transgender Warriors =

1996 book by Leslie Feinberg

- Author: Leslie Feinberg
- Publisher: Beacon Press
- Publication date: 1996
- ISBN: 9780807079416

Transgender Warriors: Making History from Joan of Arc to Dennis Rodman, published in 1996, is an autobiographical popular history by transgender activist and author Leslie Feinberg. Feinberg is best known for her novel Stone Butch Blues. In Transgender Warriors, she discusses people who have crossed sex and gender boundaries in various places from ancient times to present day. It was one of the first books to articulate a trans-historical understanding of transgender identity and argue for the inclusion of gender nonconforming people throughout history.

== Background ==
The beginnings of the research that would become Transgender Warriors first appeared in Feinberg's pamphlet "Transgender Liberation: A Movement Whose Time Has Come", which was published by the Workers World Party in 1992. This pamphlet was one of the first works to use transgender in an expansive sense, and the pamphlet gave the word a new "political charge". The Marxist lens which Feinberg uses in "Transgender Liberation" is also present in Transgender Warriors. Feinberg uses her personal history to frame her discussion of world history and help people relate the information to present day struggles. The book itself is organized into five sections correlating roughly with when Feinberg learned the information she presents and chunking similar information thematically.

== Summary ==
The first section of the book discusses how Feinberg became interested in transgender history. She discusses her childhood in Buffalo, New York and the understanding of gender she gained from the society around her, as well as how she learned about Marxism. This personal background explains how Feinberg researches and interprets the information she presents in the rest of the book, and also offers insight into which elements of Stone Butch Blues are autobiographical. Feinberg also discusses gender nonconforming people in Native American traditions and Joan of Arc, emphasizing the fact that Joan of Arc was arrested and killed specifically for cross dressing.

The second part of the book zooms out to discuss broader historical narratives of transgender people. She talks about how gender nonconforming people have been considered sacred in religions all over the world. She then discusses how transphobia developed alongside classism, patriarchy and homophobia to allow class-based societies to concentrate wealth and power among wealthy men. Feinberg specifically discusses gender nonconformity within Greece and Rome and found that they fit her thesis about transphobia being a product of classism.

In the third section, Feinberg focuses specifically on Europe. She begins by expanding her research on Joan of Arc to discuss how the Catholic church sought to consolidate power by suppressing pagan traditions which valorized transgender people. She then goes on to discuss how cross-dressing formed an important part of peasant rebellions and festival days. She finishes with a discussion of individuals who lived as members of the opposite sex during the 17th, 18th, and 19th centuries. Feinberg argues that the complexities of passing for long periods of time indicate that a desire to escape sexism or access economic opportunity alone is not sufficient to explain these actions.

In the fourth section, Feinberg discusses more contemporary transgender issues. She begins by discussing early instances of explicitly trans organization, such as the Scientific-Humanitarian Committee in interwar Germany and the Stonewall Riots in New York City. Although these events have often been thought of primarily in the context of Gay and Lesbian movements, Feinberg makes the case that transgender people were central to these efforts. In the second chapter in this section, Feinberg goes into more detail about how sex, gender and gender expression relate to each other, and talks specifically how intersex people fit into these distinctions. Feinberg next writes about the relationship between women's movements and trans movements, specifically discussing the need for an understanding of womanhood which can encompass the complexities of trans experiences. She ends with a call for transgender people to join to fight for trans rights and overthrow capitalism.

The final section of the book consists of a photo gallery of transgender people talking about their lives.

== Reception ==
In general, Transgender Warriors was better received within the LGBTQ community than by outside groups. Many reviewers found the historical analysis to be lacking rigor, but others put a higher value on the interest of Feinberg's life, the possibility of reclaiming transgender history, and contemporary understandings of what it means to be transgender. The book won the 1997 Firecracker Alternative Book Award for Nonfiction.
