= Lipstick lesbian =

Slang for a stereotypically feminine lesbian

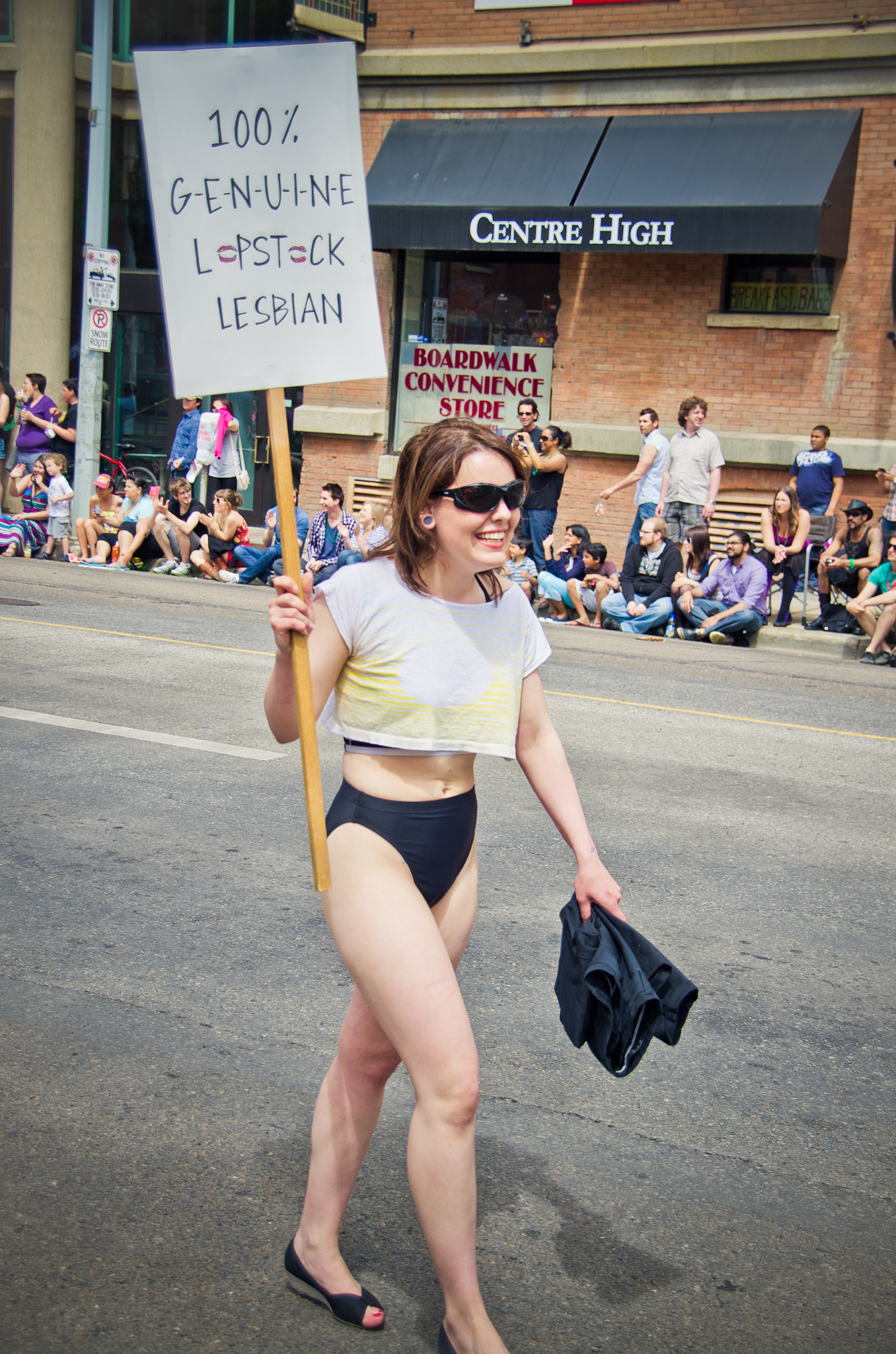
A self-described lipstick lesbian marching in Canada's Edmonton Pride Parade, 2011.

"Lipstick lesbian" is slang for a lesbian who exhibits a great amount of feminine gender attributes, such as wearing make-up, dresses or skirts, and having other characteristics associated with feminine women. In popular usage, the term is also used to characterize the feminine gender expression of bisexual women, or the broader topic of female–female sexual activity among feminine women.

An alternate term for lipstick lesbian is doily dyke.

== Definitions and society ==
The term lipstick lesbian was used in San Francisco at least as early as the 1980s. In 1982, Priscilla Rhoades, a journalist with the gay newspaper Sentinel, wrote the feature story "Lesbians for Lipstick".

In 1990, the gay newspaper OutWeek covered the Lesbian Ladies Society, a Washington, D.C.–based social group of "feminine lesbians" that required women to wear a dress or skirt to its functions.

The term lipstick lesbian became popular when used by writer Deborah Bergman, a reporter for the Los Angeles Times.

Some authors have commented that lipstick lesbian is commonly used broadly to refer to feminine bisexual women or to heterosexual women who temporarily show romantic or sexual interest in other women to impress men. For example, Jodie Brian, in Encyclopedia of Gender and Society, Volume 1 (2009), states, "A common depiction of lipstick lesbianism includes conventionally attractive and sexually insatiable women who desire one another but only insofar as their desire is a performance for male onlookers or a precursor to sex with men." In Intersectionality, Sexuality and Psychological Therapies (2012), lipstick lesbian is defined as "a lesbian/bisexual woman who exhibits 'feminine' attributes such as wearing makeup, dresses and high heeled shoes"; the book adds that "more recent iterations of feminine forms of lesbianism such as 'femme' (e.g. wears dresses/skirts or form-fitting jeans, low cut tops, makeup, jewelry), or 'lipstick lesbian' [...], are an attempt to define as both lesbian and feminine."

Some lipstick lesbians say that they choose to perform femininity rather than be subjected to it, adding that they have made an active decision to be feminine, which subverts society's demand of forced femininity. They commonly modify a typical feminine style to make it less heteronormative; Inge Blackman and Kathryn Perry gave the example of "twinning short skirts with Doctor Martens (DMs) or lacy underwear with men's trousers".

Author M. Paz Galupo stated, "Young women exposed to mainstream media outlets are seeing expressions of the same-sex desire between women much more frequently than ever before. However, mainstream images of same-sex desire between women are very specific, meaning they are often of hyper-feminine women ('lipstick lesbians')." The prominence of lipstick lesbians in the media is echoed by Rosalind Gill, who stated, "The figure of the 'luscious lesbian' [lipstick lesbian] within advertising is notable for her extraordinarily attractive, conventionally feminine appearance." Although some authors have said that the existence of lipstick lesbians is a destabilization of heterosexual ideals, by breaking the assumption that a feminine person will always desire a masculine person, and vice versa, others have said that the lipstick lesbian emergence simply fails in this regard, as lipstick lesbians are still subject to the male gaze, and still found acceptable due to their femininity.

== In media ==
The term is thought to have reached wide usage in the 1990s. A 1997 episode of the television show Ellen widely publicized the phrase. In the show, Ellen DeGeneres's character, asked by her parents whether a certain woman is a "dipstick lesbian", explains that the term is lipstick lesbian, and comments, "I would be a ChapStick lesbian." In the 1999 film But I'm a Cheerleader, the character played by Julie Delpy is identified as "Lipstick Lesbian" in the film credits.

== Flag controversy ==
The lipstick lesbian flag was introduced by Natalie McCray in 2010 in the weblog This Lesbian Life. The design contains a red kiss in the left corner, superimposed on seven stripes consisting of six shades of red and pink colors and a white bar in the center. The flag has not been widely adopted due to some lesbians complaining that it is not inclusive of butch lesbians, while others have argued that McCray wrote biphobic, racist, and transphobic comments on her now-defunct blog.

The colors of the lipstick lesbian flag were copied to create the "pink" lesbian flag (the kiss symbol was excluded). The maker of the "pink" flag remains unknown. The pink flag attracted more use as a general lesbian pride flag. (Note: In recent years, use of the "pink" lesbian flag has fallen and it has been largely replaced by the "orange-pink" lesbian flag created in 2018, which some segments of the lesbian community believe to be more inclusive.)

Illustration of "Lipstick lesbian" flag created by Natalie McCray (2010).
(This is not the original design: the kiss symbol has been modified.)

"Pink" lesbian flag with colors copied from the lipstick lesbian flag.
(Not designed by McCray. Creator unknown.)

== See also ==
- Butch and femme
- Girly girl
- Lesbian until graduation
- Lipstick feminism
- Soft butch
