= Butch and femme =

Masculine and feminine identities in lesbians

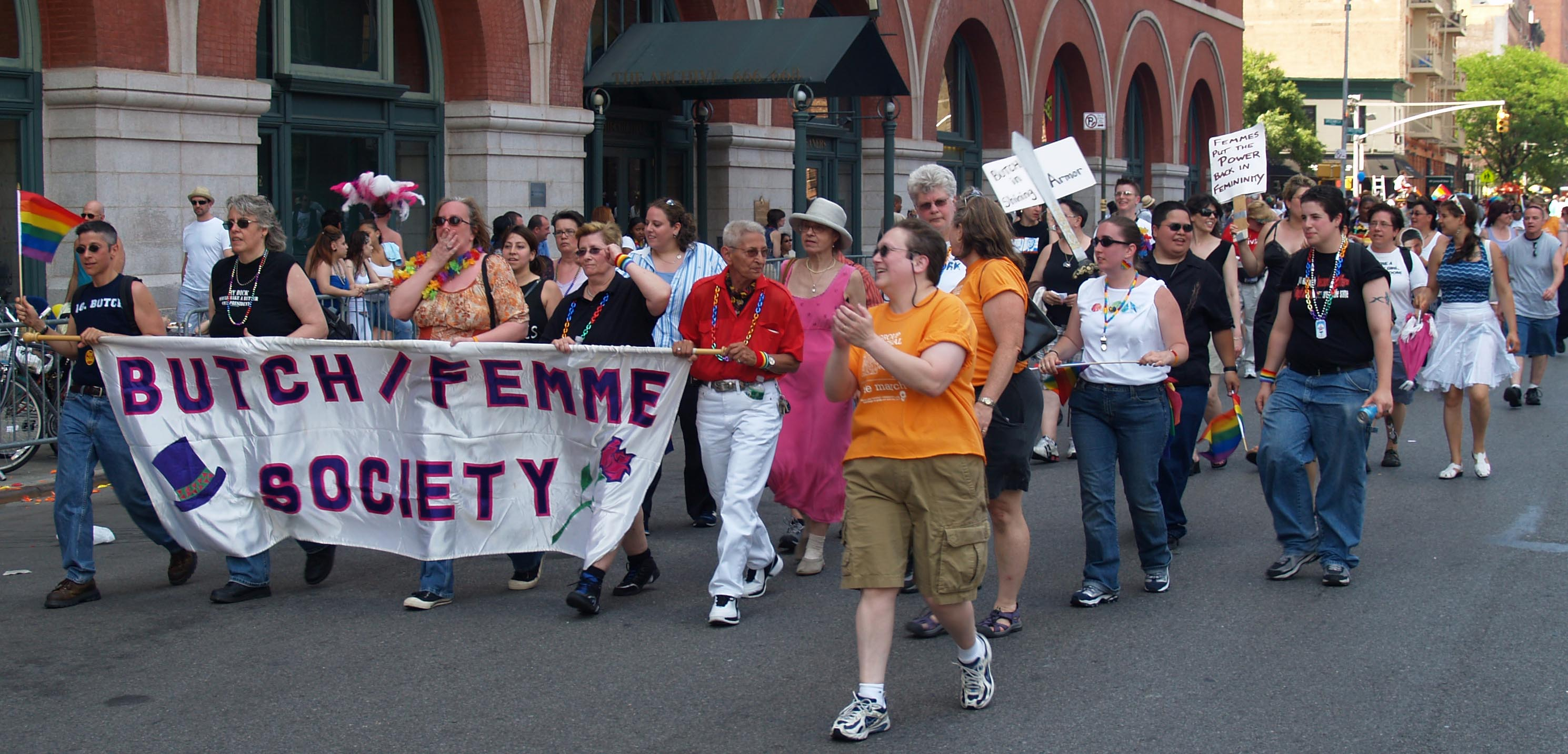
Lesbian Butch/Femme Society march in New York City's Gay Pride Parade (2007).

Butch and femme (/fɛm/; French: [fam]; from French femme 'woman') are masculine (butch) or feminine (femme) identities in the lesbian subculture that have associated traits, behaviors, styles, and self-perception. This concept has been called a "way to organize sexual relationships and gender and sexual identity". Butch–femme culture is not the sole form of a lesbian dyadic system, as there are many women in butch–butch and femme–femme relationships.

Both the expression of individual lesbians of butch and femme identities and the relationship of the lesbian community in general to the notion of butch and femme as an organizing principle for sexual relations varied over the course of the 20th century. Some lesbian feminists have argued that butch–femme is a replication of heterosexual relations, while other commentators argue that, while it resonates with heterosexual patterns of relating, butch–femme simultaneously challenges it. Research in the 1990s in the United States showed that "95% of lesbians are familiar with butch/femme codes and can rate themselves or others in terms of those codes, and yet the same percentage feels that butch/femme was 'unimportant in their lives'".

== Etymology and symbology ==
The word femme is taken from the French word for woman. The word butch, meaning "masculine", may have been coined by abbreviating the word butcher, as first noted in Robert LeRoy Parker's nickname, Butch Cassidy. However, the exact origin of the word is still unknown.

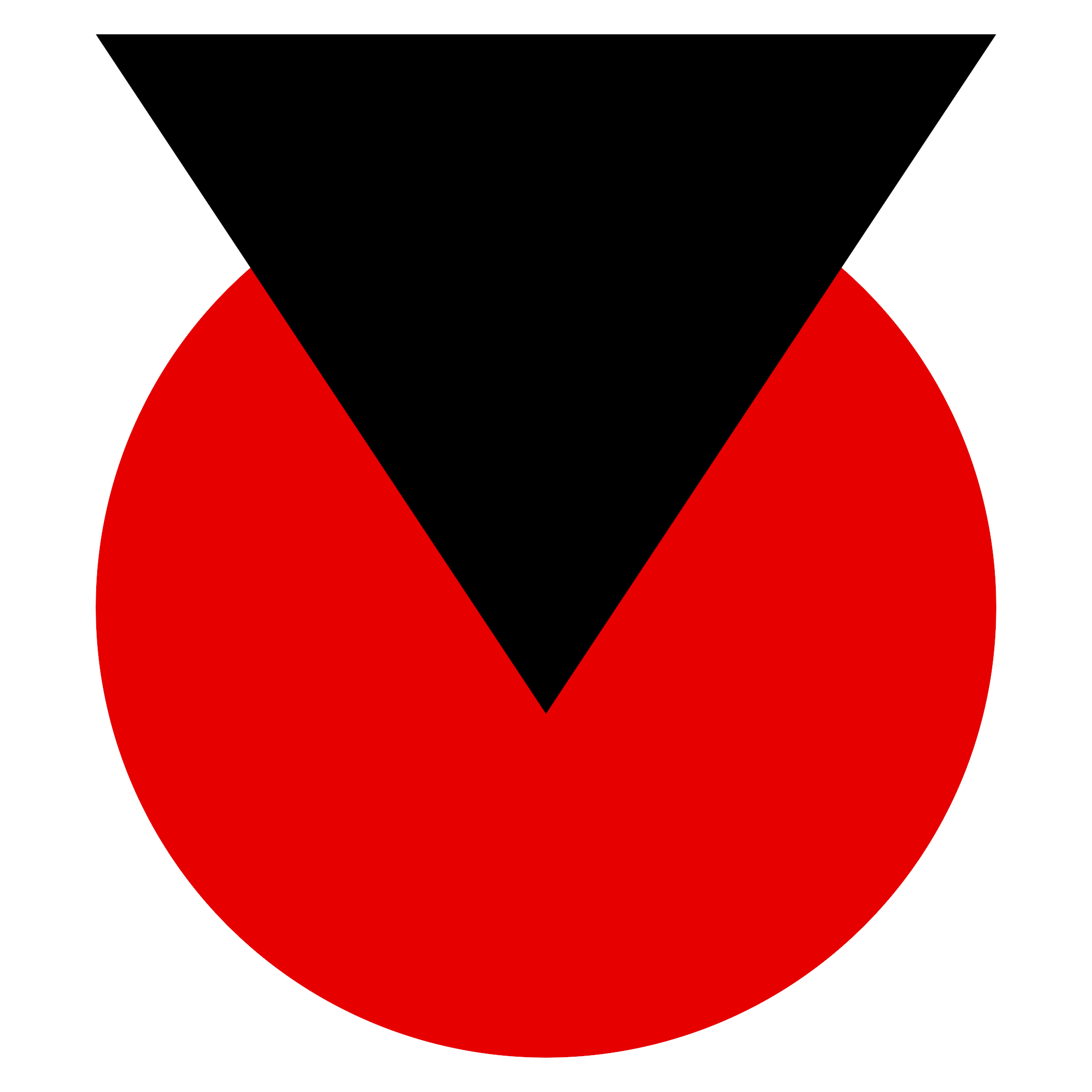
Butch-Femme symbol by Daddy Rhon

Butch artist Daddy Rhon Drinkwater created a symbol of a black triangle intersecting a red circle to represent butch/femme "passion and love".

== Attributes ==
There is debate about to whom the terms butch and femme can apply, and particularly whether transgender individuals can be identified in this way. For example, Jack Halberstam argues that transgender men cannot be considered butch, since it constitutes a conflation of maleness with butchness. Halberstam further argues that butch–femme is uniquely geared to work in lesbian relationships. Stereotypes and definitions of butch and femme vary greatly, even within tight-knit LGBTQ communities. Jewelle Gomez mused that butch and femme women in the earlier twentieth century may have been expressing their closeted transgender identity. Antipathy toward female butches and male femmes has been interpreted by some commentators as transphobia, although female butches and male femmes are not always transgender, and indeed some heterosexuals of both genders display these attributes.

Scholars such as Judith Butler and Anne Fausto-Sterling suggest that butch and femme are not attempts to take up "traditional" gender roles. Instead, they argue that gender is socially and historically constructed, rather than essential, "natural", or biological. The femme lesbian historian Joan Nestle argues that femme and butch may be seen as distinct genders in and of themselves.

=== Butch ===
"Butch" can be used as an adjective or a noun to describe an individual's gender performance. The term butch tends to denote a degree of masculinity displayed by a female individual beyond what would be considered typical of a tomboy. It is not uncommon for women with a butch appearance to face harassment or violence. A 1990s survey of butches showed that 50% were primarily attracted to femmes, while 25% reported being usually attracted to other butches. Feminist scholar Sally Rowena Munt described butches as "the recognizable public form of lesbianism" and an outlaw figure within lesbian culture. In the novel Stone Butch Blues, author Leslie Feinberg explored the working-class roots in America and the concept of transmasculine and stone butches. A stone butch is a "top" who does not want their genitals to be touched during sex.

BUTCH Voices, a national conference for "individuals who are masculine of center", including gender variant, was founded in 2008.

=== Femme ===
Like the term "butch", femme can be used as an adjective or a noun. Femmes are not "read" as lesbians unless they are with a butch partner, because they present traditionally feminine. Because they do not express masculine qualities, femmes were particularly vexing to sexologists and psychoanalysts who wanted to argue that all lesbians wished to be men. Traditionally, the femme in a butch–femme couple was expected to act as a stereotypical feminine woman and provide emotional support for her butch partner. In the first half of the twentieth century, when butch–femme gender roles were constrained to the underground bar scene, femmes were considered invisible without a butch partner – that is, they could pass as straight because of their gender conformity. However, Joan Nestle asserts that femmes in a butch–femme couple make both the butch and the femme exceedingly visible. By daring to be publicly attracted to butch women, femmes reflected their own sexual difference and made the butch a known subject of desire.

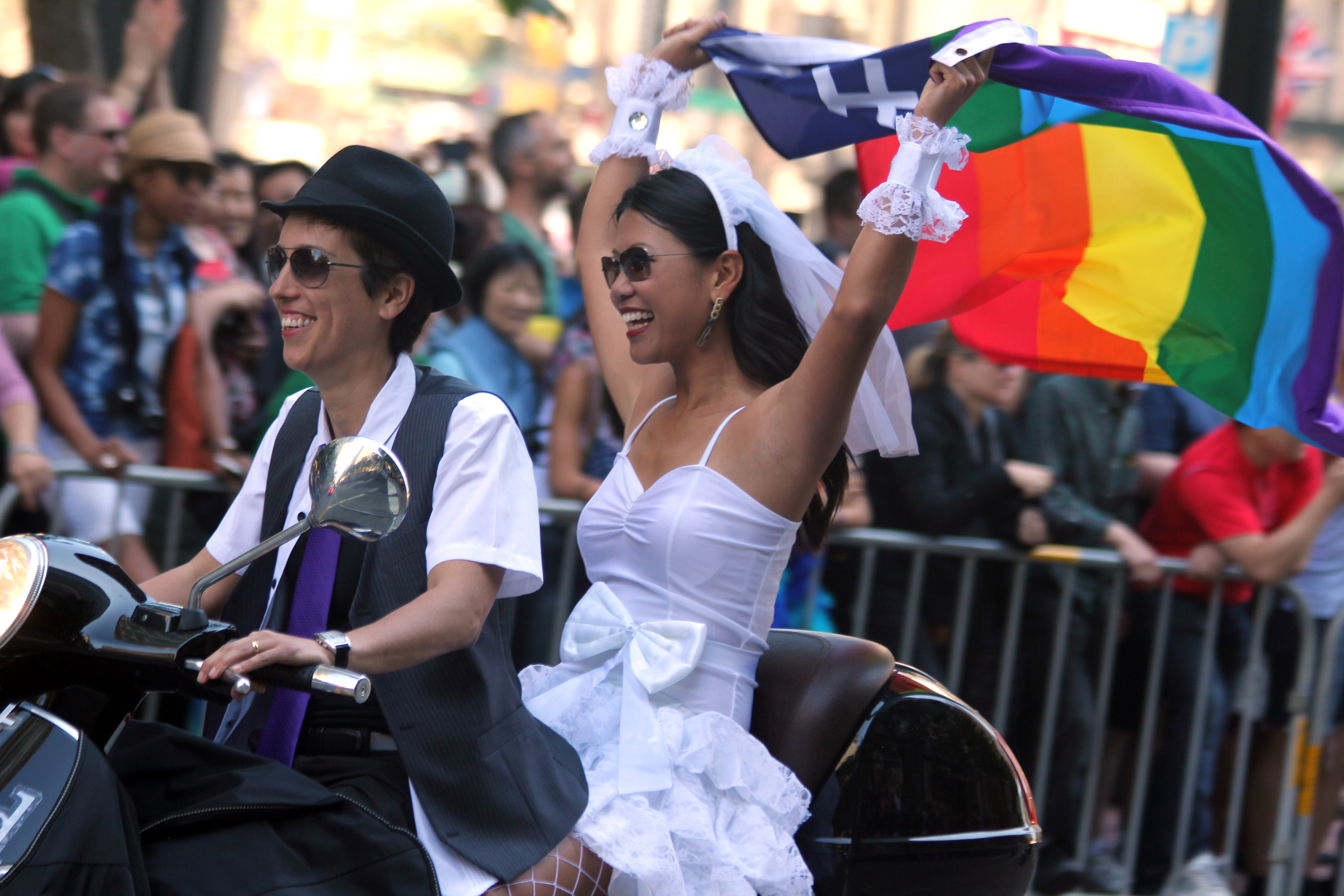
Butch lesbian (left) and femme lesbian (right)

The separatist feminist movement of the late 1960s and 1970s forced butches and femmes underground, as radical lesbian feminists found lesbian gender roles to be a disappointing and oppressive replication of heterosexual lifestyle. However, the 1980s saw a resurgence of butch and femme gender roles. In this new configuration of butch and femme, it was acceptable, even desirable, to have femme–femme sexual and romantic pairings. Femmes gained value as their own lesbian gender, making it possible to exist separately from butches. For example, Susie Bright, the founder of On Our Backs, the first lesbian sex periodical of its kind, identifies as femme. Beyond depictions in pornography, the neo-butch and neo-femme aesthetic in day-to-day life helped add a sense of visual identity to lesbians who had abandoned these roles in the name of political correctness.

In "Negotiating Dyke Femininity", lesbian scholar Wendy Somerson explains that women in the lesbian community who are more feminine and do not fit into the "butch" stereotype can pass as straight. She believes the link between appearance and gender performance and one's sexuality should be disrupted, because the way someone looks should not define their sexuality. In her article, Somerson also clearly talks about how within the lesbian community some are considered more masculine than others.

Femmes still combat the invisibility their presentation creates and assert their sexuality through their femininity. The dismissal of femmes as illegitimate or invisible also happens within the LGBT community itself, which creates the push for femmes to self-advocate as an empowered identity not inherently tied to butches.

=== Other terms ===
The term "kiki" came into existence in the 1940s to describe a lesbian who did not identify as either butch or femme, and was used disparagingly.

Labels have been tailored to be more descriptive of an individual's characteristics, such as "hard butch", "gym queen", "tomboy femme", and "soft stud". "Lipstick lesbians" are feminine lesbians. A butch woman may be described as a "dyke", "stone butch", "diesel dyke", "bulldyke", "bull bitch", or "bulldagger". A woman who likes to receive and not give sexually is called a "pillow queen", or a "pillow princess".

The term "stud" to describe a dominant lesbian emerged from the black lesbian community. The term originated with construction and animal breeding, before being associated with promiscuous or attractive men. The word made its way into AAVE through jive in the 1940s. The African-American lesbian community then adopted the word, meaning "masculine African-American lesbian". Studs tend to be influenced by urban and hip-hop cultures. In the New York City lesbian community, a butch may identify herself as AG (aggressive) or as a stud. In 2005, filmmaker Daniel Peddle chronicled the lives of AGs in his documentary The Aggressives, following six women who went to lengths like binding their breasts to pass as men. But Peddle says that today, very young lesbians of color in New York are creating a new, insular scene that is largely cut off from the rest of the gay and lesbian community: "A lot of it has to do with this kind of pressure to articulate and express your masculinity within the confines of the hip-hop paradigm." Black lesbian filmmaker Dee Rees represented the AG culture in her 2011 film Pariah.

There is also an emerging usage of the terms soft butch, "stem" (stud-femme), "futch" (feminine butch), or "chapstick lesbian" as terms for women who have characteristics of both butch and femme. Lesbians who are neither butch nor femme are called "androgynous" or "andros". The term boi is typically used by younger LGBT women. Defining the difference between a butch and a boi, one boi told a reporter: "that sense of play – that's a big difference from being a butch. To me, butch is like an adult...You're the man of the house." Comedian Elvira Kurt contributed the term "fellagirly" as a description for LGBT women who are not strictly either femme or butch, but a combination.

== History ==
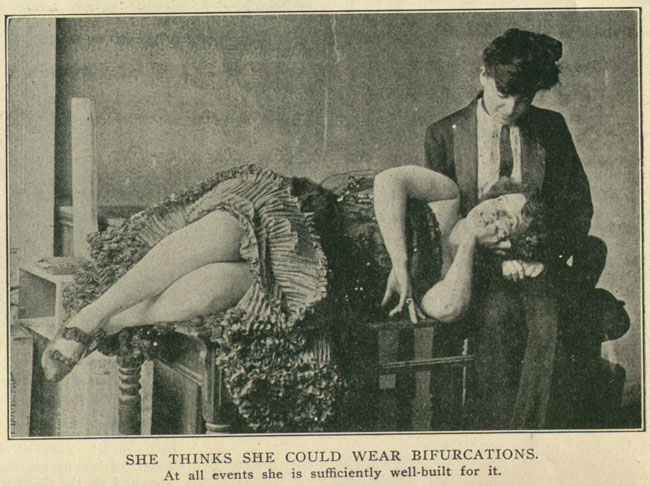
1903 depiction of women in "femme" and "butch" apparel

Prior to the middle of the 20th century in Western culture, homosexual societies were mostly underground or secret, making it difficult to determine how long butch and femme roles have been practiced by women.

=== Early 20th century ===
It is known that butch–femme dress codes date back at least to the beginning of the 20th century as photographs from 1900 to 1920 exist of butch–femme couples in the United States; they were at the time called "transvestites". However, according to the Routledge International Encyclopaedia of Women, although upper-class women like Radclyffe Hall and her lover Una Troubridge lived together in unions that resembled butch–femme relationships, "The term butch/femme would have been categorically inconsequential, however, and incomprehensible to these women."

=== Mid- to late 20th century ===
Butch and femme lesbian labels were only starting to become apparent in the 1940s, since it started to become common to allow women to enter bars without men. In the 1940s in the U.S., most butch women had to wear conventionally feminine dress in order to hold down jobs, donning their starched shirts and ties only on weekends to go to bars or parties as "Saturday night" butches. Butches had to take a subtle approach to butchness in order to exist in society. They created outfits that were outwardly accepted by society, but allowed those who were butch to still present as more masculine than the norm. Alix Genter states that "butches wore long, pleated skirts with their man-tailored shirts, sometimes with a vest or coat on top" at Bay Ridge High school.

The 1950s saw the rise of a new generation of butches who refused to live double lives and wore butch attire full-time, or as close to full-time as possible. This usually limited them to a few jobs, such as factory work and cab driving, that had no dress codes for women. Their increased visibility, combined with the anti-gay politics of the McCarthy era, led to an increase in violent attacks, while at the same time the increasingly strong and defiant bar culture became more willing to respond with force. Although femmes also fought back, it became primarily the role of butches to defend against attacks and hold the bars as gay women's space. While in the '40s, the prevailing butch image was severe but gentle, it became increasingly tough and aggressive as violent confrontation became a fact of life. In 1992, a "groundbreaking" anthology about the butch–femme socialization that took place in working class bars of the 40s and 50s was published—The Persistent Desire: A Femme–Butch Reader, edited by femme Joan Nestle.

Although butch–femme was not the only organizing principle among lesbians in the mid-20th century, it was particularly prominent in the working-class lesbian bar culture of the 1940s, 1950s, and 1960s, where butch–femme was the norm, while butch–butch and femme–femme relationships were taboo. Those who switched roles were called ki-ki, a pejorative term, and they were often the butt of jokes. In the 1950s, in an early piece of lesbian studies, the gay rights campaigning organisation ONE, Inc. assigned Stella Rush to study "the butch/femme phenomenon" in gay bars. Rush reported that women held strong opinions, that "role distinctions needed to be sharply drawn," and that not being one or the other earned strong disapproval from both groups. It has been noted that, at least in part, kiki women were unwelcome where lesbians gathered because their apparent lack of understanding of the butch–femme dress code might indicate that they were policewomen.

In contrast to ONE, Inc. studies, more conservative homophile organizations of the 1950s, such as the Daughters of Bilitis, discouraged butch–femme roles and identities. This was especially true in relation to the butch identity, as the organization held the belief that assimilation into heterosexual society was the goal of the homophile movement. Gender expressions outside of the norm prevented assimilation.

In the 1970s, the development of lesbian feminism pushed butch–femme roles out of popularity. Lesbian separatists such as Sheila Jeffreys argued that all forms of masculinity, including masculine butch women, were negative and harmful to women. The group of radical lesbians often credited with sparking lesbian feminism, Radicalesbians, called butch culture "male-identified role-playing among lesbians". This encouraged the emergence of androgyny in lesbian feminist circles, with many women wearing clothing like T-shirts, jeans, flannels, and boots. This dress was very similar to butch dress, weakening a key identifier of butch lesbians.

While butch–femme roles had previously been the primary way of identifying lesbians and quantifying lesbian relationships in the 1940s, 1950s, and 1960s, lesbian feminist ideology had turned these roles into a "perversion of lesbian identity". Lesbian feminism was publicly represented though white feminism, and often excluded and alienated working class lesbians and lesbians of color. In these excluded communities, butch–femme roles persisted and grew throughout the 1970s. Despite the criticism from both middle-class lesbians and lesbian feminists, butch and femme roles reemerged in the 1980s and 1990s, but were no longer relegated to only working-class lesbians.

=== 21st century ===
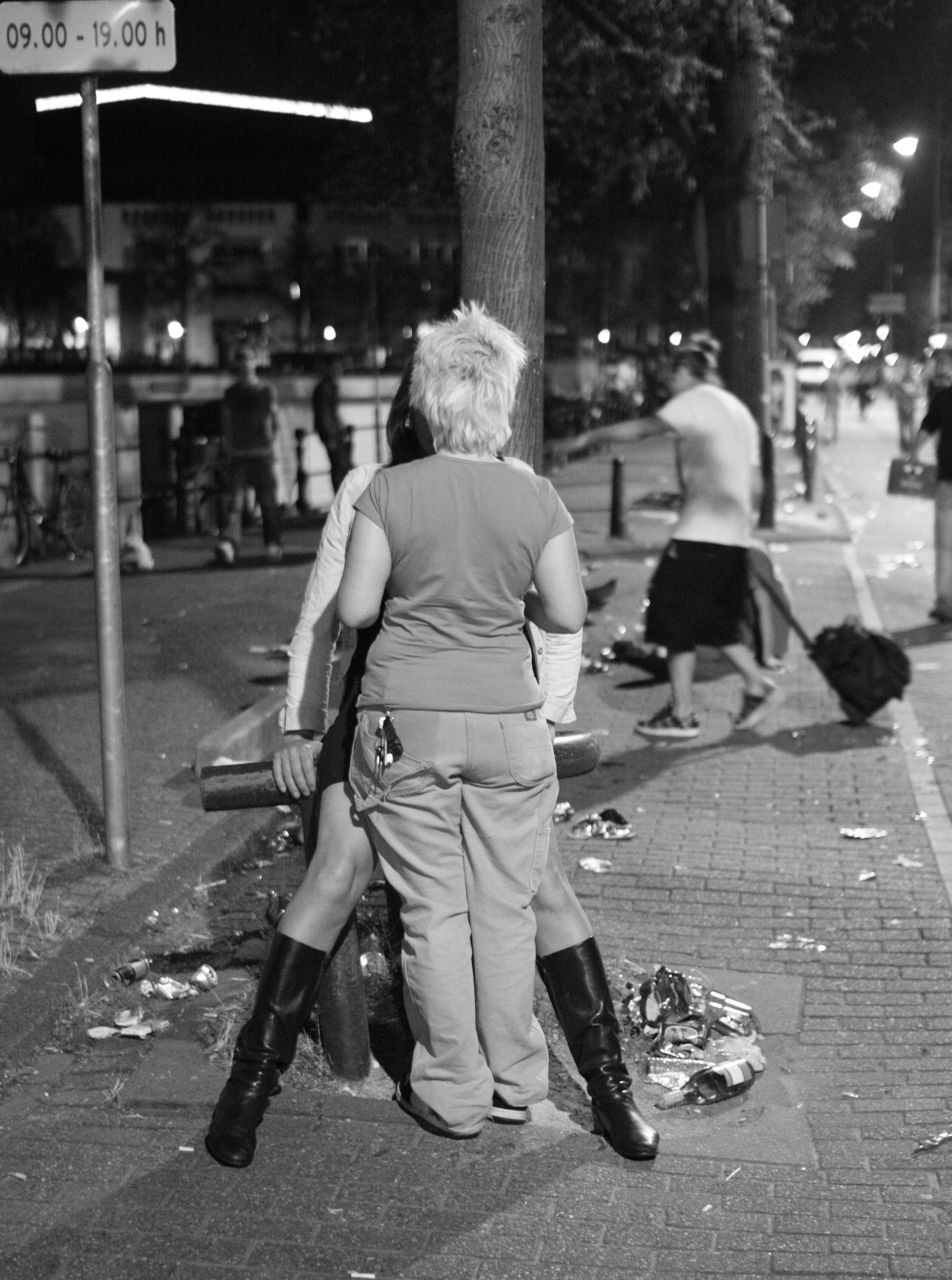
At the Pride in Amsterdam, 2009

In the 21st century, some writers and commentators began to describe a phenomenon in the lesbian community called "The Disappearing Butch". Some felt butches were disappearing because it had become easier for masculine women who might have previously identified as butch to have sex reassignment surgery and live as men. Others claimed the Disappearing Butch was the result of lesbian 'commodification' in the media, influenced by the viewing public's desire to see lesbians as "reproductions of Hollywood straight women". One writer noted that in the increased drive for LGBT 'normalization' and political acceptance, butch lesbians and effeminate gay men seemed to be disappearing. In the 21st century, some younger people were also beginning to eschew labels like 'butch' or even 'lesbian' and identify instead as queer.'

However, others noted that butch women have gained increased visibility in the media, mentioning Ellen DeGeneres, frequently referred to as 'a soft butch', political commentator Rachel Maddow, once described as a 'butch fatale' and the character Big Boo in Orange Is the New Black, played by butch comic and actress Lea de Laria.

The 21st century also saw a re-examination of the meaning of 'femme', with the term being used in a broader and more politically charged way, particularly by women of color, and some critics challenging what is seen as its appropriation by heteronormative culture.

Although historically associated primarily with lesbian communities, many bisexual individuals—particularly sapphic bisexual women (those attracted to women)—have identified as butch or femme over time, actively contributing to the cultural and political development of these identities. For much of the 20th century, the term "lesbian" was often used as an umbrella term encompassing all women who engaged in romantic or sexual relationships with other women, including bisexual women. This inclusive usage meant that bisexual women participated in shaping these identities and spaces. Scholars have noted that butch and femme roles were prominent in working-class lesbian and bisexual communities during the mid-20th century.

== See also ==
- Drag king
- Girly girl
- Tom-Dee (Thailand)
- Bear
- Bishonen
- Down-low (sexual slang)
- Effeminacy
- Femminiello
- Sissy
- Top and bottom
- Twink
- En femme
