= Boi (slang) =

Slang LGBT word for a masculine-presenting person

Boi (plural: bois) is slang within butch and femme and gay male communities for several sexual or gender identities.

The term has also been used, independently of any meaning related to sexuality, as an alternate spelling for boy, often as a jocular (meme) spelling.

The term is also used in Wales (United Kingdom), particularly in the north, as a familiar term of address or greeting to anyone, regardless of gender or sexual orientation. The plural is bois, and may be addressed to a mixed, or any single sex, group.

== Usage ==
=== In the LGBT community ===
The term boi may be used to denote a number of sexual orientations and possibilities that are not mutually exclusive:

- A boyish lesbian.
- A submissive butch in the BDSM community.
- A young trans man, or a trans man who is in the earlier stages of transitioning.
- A younger bisexual or gay man who may have effeminate characteristics. The term can also be used by anyone who wishes to distinguish from heterosexual or heteronormative identities.

Boi may also refer to someone assigned female at birth, who generally does not identify as, or only partially identifies as feminine, female, a girl, or a woman. Some bois are trans or intersex people. They may be gay or queer. Many trans bois are also genderqueer/nonbinary (in itself a trans/transgender group), or might identify as cis persons or trans men, and yet practice genderfuck in which they do not fit in either masculine or feminine binary gender presentation. Bois may prefer a range of pronouns, including "he", "she", or nonbinary and gender-neutral pronouns such as "they".

=== In popular culture and meme culture ===
One of the earliest usages of the term boi was with the rapper Big Boi. In the early 2000s the term came into usage within skateboarding culture. The term came into popular culture again with the song "Sk8er Boi" by Avril Lavigne. The term came into meme culture with the Dat Boi meme: an animation of a frog on a unicycle usually accompanied by the caption "Here come dat boi. (O shit waddup!)"

=== As a Welsh colloquialism ===
In Welsh, boi is a masculine pronoun used as an informal form of address, as in lawn, boi? ("All right, mate?") It is more common in North Wales: and can be anglicized as "boyo".

== See also ==
- Dat Boi
