= Dat Boi =

Meme of a frog riding a unicycle

A still frame of the original GIF, created for the Animation Factory before becoming the "Dat Boi" meme

Dat Boi is an Internet meme originating from the clip art website Animation Factory. It depicts a frog riding a unicycle. The meme garnered popularity on Tumblr in 2015 before gaining more recognition through Twitter in 2016. It is usually accompanied by a person saying "here come dat boi shit waddup".

== History ==
According to Animation Factory employee Ryan Hagen, the frog GIF used in the meme was created by designer Josh Doohen.

The original GIF animation was uploaded to the Animation Factory website on June 02, 2003

The meme's name originates from an edited news screenshot. The line of text often used in association with the image ("here come dat boi! o shit waddup!") was taken from memes involving "Here Comes Pacman", an animation based on the Pac-Man segment of the Bloodhound Gang song "Mope". The frog image and its caption were first put together on Facebook, according to Vox. The Verge writer Chris Plante referred to the caption in a June article, stating that the Dat Boi image itself was "not enough" and should be paired with the caption.

In May 2016, the "here come dat boi" caption came under criticism after various Facebook users claimed to find it an "appropriation of African-American Vernacular English". As a result, certain Facebook groups discouraged use of the meme.

Dat Boi was featured in The Guardian's "Month in Memes" article for June 2016. Matt Furie, creator of Pepe the Frog, explained in a June 2016 interview with Comic Book Resources that he was "devastated" to find out that Dat Boi had "begun to overshadow Internet Pepe".

== Notable uses ==
- Nintendo tweeted an image of its Slippy Toad character next to the Dat Boi frog on May 13, 2016.
- The Twitter account for the restaurant chain Denny's tweeted an image of Dat Boi, calling the frog "Dat Busboi".
- Kenyatta Cheese, co-founder of Know Your Meme, described Dat Boi as "a piece of culture" to the editors of Vice.
- In an interview with PopSugar about viral trends, model Josh Ostrovsky mentioned the meme and admitted, "obviously I love Dat Boi".
- The Australian Manufacturing Workers Union posted a "Dat Boi" meme to comment on the 2016 Australian federal election.
- Also during the 2016 federal election in Australia, SBS Comedy published a satirical article claiming that the "Dat Boi" frog had become the most popular candidate for Prime Minister of Australia among youth voters.

== See also ==
- Toad worship, Chinese internet subculture
