= Stone Butch Blues =

1993 novel by Leslie Feinberg

- Front cover of 2004 Alyson Books paperback edition
- Author: Leslie Feinberg
- Language: English
- Genre: Historical fiction
- Publisher: Firebrand Books
- Publication date: March 1993
- Publication place: United States
- Media type: Print (hardcover and paperback)
- ISBN: 1-56341-030-3
- OCLC: 27336208
- Dewey Decimal: 813/.54 20
- LC Class: PS3556.E427 S7 1993

Stone Butch Blues is a novel by Leslie Feinberg. Written from the perspective of stone butch lesbian Jess Goldberg, it intimately details her life in the last half of the 20th century in New York.

While fictional, the work takes large inspiration from Feinberg's lived experiences, describing it as "Like my own life, this novel defies easy classification. If you found Stone Butch Blues in a bookstore or library, what category was it in? Lesbian fiction? Gender studies? [...] this book is a lesbian novel and a transgender novel—making 'trans' genre a verb, as well as an adjective." They also describe it as their "call to action."

While Stone Butch Blues is a heavy read as noted by its advisory warning, it is frequently discussed as an essential work for LGBT communities, as it "never shies away from portraying the anti-Semitism, classism, homophobia, anti-butch animus, and transphobia that protagonist Jess Goldberg faced on a daily basis—but it also shows the healing power of love and political activism."

== Plot summary ==
The narrative of Stone Butch Blues follows the life of Jess Goldberg, who grows up in a working-class area of Buffalo, New York in the 1940s. Her parents, frustrated with Jess's gender nonconformity, eventually institutionalize Jess in a psychiatric ward for three weeks. When she reaches puberty and feels the weight of gendered difference, Jess learns of a gay bar from a coworker. There, she meets drag queens, butches, and femmes. Butch Al and Jacqueline take Jess in and teach her about lesbian roles and culture. After a police raid, the bar closes and Jess loses touch with Butch Al and Jacqueline. At school, football players harass Jess, tackling and gang-raping her. Traumatized, she drops out of school the next day, packing her bags and running away from home to a lesbian bar, where a butch, Toni, offers to let Jess sleep on her couch.

Jess finds her place in the lesbian community of Buffalo while the cops continue to raid gay bars. Jess is arrested, beaten, and raped by them. In a traumatized state, Jess and Toni fight, and Jess is left houseless again. She is taken in by Angie, a femme sex worker. The two have an intimate conversation and then sex. When Angie attempts to touch her, Jess cringes. Angie identifies Jess as a stone butch, assuring Jess that there is nothing wrong with being stone.

Jess gets a factory job and gets involved in union organization, but is alienated by male coworkers. One man intentionally jams Jess's machine, severely injuring Jess and leaving her unemployed. At her next job, Jess meets Theresa. Theresa is fired after opposing her boss for sexually harassing her, and Jess begins to date her. With Theresa, Jess matures, learns to take responsibility in relationships, and softens her stony exterior. Jess proposes, and they are unofficially wedded at the bar, a drag queen leading the procession.

Cops continue raids and retaliation increases, the crowd inspired by the Stonewall riots. Jess and the others are arrested, beaten, and raped by the police. Theresa, who takes care of Jess after raids, attends feminist meetings, where others treat her love of butches as a betrayal of the feminist cause. Meanwhile, Jess talks at length about her gender confusion, feeling like neither man nor woman. Theresa is confused and encourages Jess to forget about it, but the two later argue over Jess's gender. Jess learns about, and decides to pursue, medical transition. Theresa disapproves, and they break up.

Jess starts taking testosterone, gets chest reconstruction surgery, and begins to pass as a male. While relieved to be safer in public, Jess has complex feelings about her loss of visibility as a lesbian. She asks out Annie, a barista, and they have a date at Annie's house. Before they have sex, Jess slips into her strap-on without Annie noticing, effectively passing as male through their encounter. The next day, Jess accompanies Annie to a wedding, where Annie makes several homophobic comments. Horrified by Annie's use of slurs and insinuation that gay people are sex offenders, Jess leaves.

After years of passing as a man, Jess stops taking testosterone. She no longer passes as male and feels continually more comfortable in her gender nonconforming body. After encountering Theresa and her new partner at a grocery store, Jess decides she needs to leave Buffalo and moves to New York City. Jess forms a close friendship with her neighbor Ruth, a trans woman. While taking the subway, Jess is attacked and seriously injured by a group of teenage boys. Ruth nurses Jess back to health and they confess their love for each other on Christmas Eve.

Ruth and Jess embark on a road trip to Upstate New York to visit Ruth's family. While there, Jess visits Buffalo and reconnects with friends from her past. After returning to New York City, Jess witnesses a queer rights demonstration and decides to speak about her experiences. As the novel closes, Jess feels her life coming full circle, and she is filled with hope for her future with Ruth.

== Reception and impact ==
Stone Butch Blues has received high praise for many years. Laura Sackton of Book Riot named it as one of the forty best queer books of all time, describing it as "the kind of queer, trans narrative we badly need: honest, freeing, and vital." The New York Public Library has listed it as one of 125 books they love, marking it as the forefront of a "new movement of transgender political identity and solidarity that was taking shape in the 1990s." The Guardian also listed Stone Butch Blues as one of the "top 10 transgender books."

Feinberg covers topics related to union organizing and political activism in her real life, making Stone Butch Blues a political piece in addition to an LGBT work. The novel is also a significant work for many labor organizers, listed in Autostraddle as essential LGBT labor history reading. As mentioned by Diane Anderson-Minshall in The Advocate, Jess's relationships throughout the novel also highlight the historical significance of femme sex workers within lesbian communities.

Stone Butch Blues is considered a cult classic in LGBT communities, and continues to be popular almost 30 years after its original publication. At the Michael C. Weidemann LGBTQ Library, which houses over 9,000 books, Stone Butch Blues "is forever being checked out." LGBT people often find comfort within the novel's sense of "bleak hope, the core to queer self-preservation." However, it has also been discussed as a novel that should be read outside of the LGBT community, with Jo Livingstone stating "Stone Butch Blues, the cornerstone of her career, is a very good book by any measure," and that it is worth reading "if you're middle-aged or elderly or a teen who hasn't yet decided what to grow up to be." After Feinberg's death in 2014, the book received renewed media attention, mentioned in Slate, The Guardian, Jezebel, on CNN, and elsewhere.

== Publication history ==
The novel was first published by Firebrand Books in 1993, and picked up by Alyson Books in 2003. A 20th anniversary edition was released in 2014. A free e-book edition is currently available on Feinberg's website. Feinberg requested that the 20th anniversary edition was made available for free as "part of her entire life work as a communist to 'change the world' in the struggle for justice and liberation from oppression."

== Awards ==
The book was a 1994 Lambda Literary Award finalist in the category of Lesbian Fiction, and shared the award in the Small Press Books category with Sojourner: Black Gay Voices in the Age of AIDS. It also won the 1994 American Library Association Gay & Lesbian Book Award (now the Stonewall Book Award).

== Major themes ==
Stone Butch Blues is most commonly described as a genderqueer narrative. It is sometimes seen as postmodern because of the ways it presents gender as a signifier lacking a fixed referent in the body, and the way Jess's identity breaks down the categories of male and female. As such, it is also about crossing boundaries and seeking home. Jay Prosser writes that, "Jess does not feel at home in her female body in the world and attempts to remake it with hormones and surgery." Because of her masculinity, she is also not at home in her community of origin, and thus the search for home becomes a theme as well. While physical changes help Jess to feel more at home in her body, Jess has greater difficulty finding a home in the world. Ultimately the book takes a stance of supporting coalitions.

Jess's stone butch identity illuminates the extent to which sexual trauma can affect one's sexual subjectivity. The first mention of Jess's stone butch identity occurs in her first sexual encounter with Angie, who tells Jess she is "stone already" after Jess reacts negatively to Angie's attempts to touch Jess in a sexual way. Leading up to this encounter, Jess has experienced rape at the hands of boys her age and police officers. Jess admits to Angie that she has been hurt, but cannot discuss the details. Her difficulty opening up to femmes, both sexually and emotionally, is a sign of the sexualized trauma she experiences both at a young age, and throughout her life by way of police brutality.

Stone Butch Blues is also a novel of the working class. Much of the action takes place within factories in Buffalo, New York. The novel involves a great deal of union organizing and discusses the treatment of working-class people. Feinberg also shows how gender and class intersect to shape Jess's identity, by portraying her discomfort with the middle-class feminists who disdain both the butch and femme identities that are standards of Jess's own working-class community. Cat Moses writes that "Stone Butch Blues is informed by an underlying yearning for the development of a revolutionary class consciousness among the proletariat, across gender and racial divisions."

== Translations ==
Stone Butch Blues has been translated into Chinese, Russian, German, Italian, Hebrew, Slovenian, Basque, French, Spanish and Swedish.
