= Leslie Feinberg =

American transgender activist and author (1949–2014)

- Feinberg taken by Ulrike Anhamm in 1997
- Born: September 1, 1949; Kansas City, Missouri, U.S.
- Died: November 15, 2014 (aged 65); Syracuse, New York, U.S.
- Occupations: Author, activist
- Spouse: Minnie Bruce Pratt (m. 2011)
- Website: transgenderwarrior.org

Leslie Feinberg (September 1, 1949 – November 15, 2014) was an American butch lesbian, transgender activist, communist, and author. Feinberg authored Stone Butch Blues in 1993. Her (Note: Feinberg used a variety of pronouns, however she favored she/her pronouns when writing for general audiences. As Wikipedia is written for a general audience, this article follows this guideline. For more information see § Pronoun usage.) writing, notably Stone Butch Blues and her pioneering popular history book Transgender Warriors (1996), laid the groundwork for much of the terminology and awareness around gender studies and was instrumental in bringing these issues to a more mainstream audience.

== Early life ==
Feinberg was born in Kansas City, Missouri and raised in Buffalo, New York in a working-class, Jewish family. At fourteen years old, she began work at a display sign shop at a local department store. Feinberg eventually dropped out of Bennett High School, though she officially received a diploma. Feinberg began frequenting gay bars in Buffalo and primarily worked in low-wage and temporary jobs, including washing dishes, cleaning cargo ships, working as a sign-language interpreter, inputting medical data, and working at a PVC pipe factory and a book bindery.

== Career ==
When Feinberg was in her twenties, she met members of the Workers World Party at a demonstration for the land rights and self-determination of Palestinians and joined the Buffalo branch of the party. After moving to New York City, Feinberg took part in anti-war, anti-racist, and pro-labor demonstrations on behalf of the party for many years, including the March Against Racism (Boston, 1974), a national tour about HIV/AIDS (1983–84), and a mobilization against KKK members (Atlanta, 1988).

Feinberg began writing in the 1970s. As a member of the Workers World Party, she was the editor of the political prisoners page of the Workers World newspaper for fifteen years, and by 1995, she had become the managing editor.

Feinberg's first novel, the 1993 Stone Butch Blues, won the Lambda Literary Award and the 1994 American Library Association Gay & Lesbian Book Award (now called the Stonewall Book Award). While there are parallels to Feinberg's experiences as a working-class dyke, the work is not an autobiography. Her second novel, Drag King Dreams, was released in 2006. It was a finalist for the Lambda Literary Award for Transgender Literature in 2007.

Her nonfiction work included the books Transgender Liberation: A Movement Whose Time Has Come in 1992 and Transgender Warriors: Making History from Joan of Arc to Dennis Rodman in 1996. Both works were finalists for Lambda Literary Awards for Transgender Literature. Also in 1996, Feinberg appeared in Rosa von Praunheim's documentary, Transexual Menace. In 2009, she released Rainbow Solidarity in Defense of Cuba—a compilation of 25 journalistic articles.

In Transgender Warriors, Feinberg suggests that the term "transgender" was commonly used in two different ways. It served as an umbrella term encompassing anyone who questions or challenges traditional ideas of sex and gender. Additionally, it referred specifically to the distinction between individuals who change the sex assigned to them at birth and those whose gender expression is seen as not aligning with societal expectations for their sex.

Feinberg's writings on LGBT history, "Lavender & Red", frequently appeared in the Workers World newspaper.

Feinberg was outspoken about her support for Palestinians. In a 2007 speech given to the first public conference of Aswat, an organization for LGBT Palestinian women, in Haifa in 2007, Feinberg said, "I am with Palestinian liberation with every breath in my body; every muscle and every sinew." In a 2006 interview with Mattilda Bernstein Sycamore about Drag King Dreams, Feinberg said of her novel's Jewish characters, "for Heshie and Max, this question of the occupation of Palestine goes to the heart of what it means to live an authentic life in a period in which this really historical crime is taking place in their name."

== Awards and recognition ==
In 2007 Feinberg was awarded an honorary doctorate from Starr King School for the Ministry for transgender and social justice work.

In June 2019 Feinberg was one of the inaugural fifty American "pioneers, trailblazers, and heroes" inducted on the National LGBTQ Wall of Honor within the Stonewall National Monument (SNM) in New York City's Stonewall Inn. The SNM is the first U.S. national monument dedicated to LGBTQ rights and history, and the wall's unveiling was timed to take place during the 50th anniversary of the Stonewall riots.

In 2023, Publishing Triangle renamed their award for trans and gender-variant literature after her, naming it the Leslie Feinberg Award for Trans and Gender-Variant Literature.

== Illness ==
In 2008, Feinberg was diagnosed with Lyme disease. She wrote that the infection first came about in the 1970s, when there was limited knowledge related to such diseases and that she felt hesitant to deal with medical professionals for many years due to her transgender identity. For this reason, she only received treatment later in life. In the 2000s, Feinberg created art and blogged about her illnesses with a focus on disability art and class consciousness.

== Personal life ==
Feinberg described herself as "an anti-racist white, working-class, secular Jewish, transgender, lesbian, female, revolutionary communist."

According to Julie Enszer, a friend of Feinberg's, Feinberg sometimes "passed" as a man for safety reasons.

Feinberg's spouse, Minnie Bruce Pratt, was a professor at Syracuse University in Syracuse, New York. Feinberg and Pratt married in New York and Massachusetts in 2011. In the mid and late 1990s they attended Camp Trans together which was held outside of the Michigan Womyn's Music Festival in protest of its trans-exclusionary womyn-born womyn policy. Excerpts from Feinberg's 1994 speech at Camp Trans appear in the Winter 1995 issue of TransSisters: The Journal of Transsexual Feminism. The journal reported that during her introduction to security at the festival, Feinberg presented that "although she was born with female anatomy and still identifies as a woman and as a lesbian that she also identifies as transgendered, that she passes as a man, is frequently mistaken for a man, that her driver's license lists her sex as male, and that sometimes she and her lover pass as a heterosexual couple". Upon her question, Feinberg was denied entry into the festival before the security coordinators quickly reversed the decision.

Feinberg died on November 15, 2014, of complications due to multiple tick-borne infections, including "Lyme disease, babeisiosis, and protomyxzoa rheumatica", which she had suffered from since the 1970s. Feinberg's last words were reported to be, "Hasten the revolution! Remember me as a revolutionary communist."

=== Pronoun usage ===
Feinberg stated in a 2006 interview that her pronouns varied depending on context:

For me, pronouns are always placed within context. I am female-bodied, I am a butch lesbian, a transgender lesbian—referring to me as "she/her" is appropriate, particularly in a non-trans setting in which referring to me as "he" would appear to resolve the social contradiction between my birth sex and gender expression and render my transgender expression invisible. I like the gender neutral pronoun "ze/hir" because it makes it impossible to hold on to gender/sex/sexuality assumptions about a person you're about to meet or you've just met. And in an all trans setting, referring to me as "he/him" honors my gender expression in the same way that referring to my sister drag queens as "she/her" does.

— Leslie Feinberg, 2006

Feinberg's widow wrote in her statement regarding Feinberg's death that Feinberg “preferred to use the pronouns she/zie and her/hir for herself, but also said: 'I care which pronoun is used, but people have been respectful to me with the wrong pronoun and disrespectful with the right one. It matters whether someone is using the pronoun as a bigot, or if they are trying to demonstrate respect.'"

== Books ==
- Journal of a Transsexual. World View Forum, 1980. Chapbook.
- Transgender Liberation: A Movement Whose Time Has Come. World View Forum, 1992. ISBN 0-89567-105-0. Chapbook.
- Stone Butch Blues. San Francisco: Firebrand Books, 1993. ISBN 1-55583-853-7.
- Transgender Warriors: Making History from Joan of Arc to Dennis Rodman. Boston: Beacon Press, 1996. ISBN 0-8070-7941-3.
- Trans Liberation: Beyond Pink or Blue. Beacon Press, 1999. ISBN 0-8070-7951-0
- Drag King Dreams. New York: Carroll & Graf, 2006. ISBN 0-7867-1763-7.
- Rainbow Solidarity in Defense of Cuba. New York: World View Forum, 2009. ISBN 0-89567-150-6.

== See also ==
- Catherine Ryan Hyde
- Gender neutrality in languages with gendered third-person pronouns
- LGBT culture in New York City
- List of LGBT people from New York City
