= Femme =

Identity for lesbians, with feminine characteristics

Femme (/fɛm/; French: [fam], literally meaning 'woman') is a term traditionally used to describe a lesbian woman who exhibits a feminine identity or gender presentation. While commonly viewed as a lesbian term, alternate meanings of the word also exist with some non-lesbian individuals using the word, notably some gay men and bisexuals. Some non-binary and transgender individuals also identify as lesbians using this term.

Heavily associated with lesbian history and culture, femme has been used among lesbians to distinguish traditionally feminine lesbians from their butch (i.e. masculine or non-feminine) lesbian counterparts and partners. (Note: According to Heidi M. Levitt and Sara K. Bridges: "The terms femme and butch began infiltrating bisexual communities, and women began writing about their experiences as bisexual femmes...Although essayists have begun to explore this identity, very little empirical research has been conducted looking at the expression and experience of gender expression and gender identity within bisexual women." According to some academic studies about the butch/femme subculture, "Femmes were sometimes bisexual.") Derived from American lesbian communities following World War II when women joined the workforce, the identity became a characteristic of the working-class lesbian bar culture of the 1940s–1950s. By the 1990s, the term femme had additionally been adopted by bisexual women.

== 1940s through 60s culture ==
Scholars Heidi M. Levitt and Sara K. Bridges state that the terms butch and femme are derived from the 1940s–1950s American lesbian communities following World War II "when women joined the work force and began wearing pants, creating the possibility for the development of a butch aesthetic and gender expression within gay women's communities." They state that "the butch–femme culture made lesbians visible for the first time."

Femme lesbian scholar Joan Nestle describes the femme lesbian identity as being underrepresented in historical records, with femme women having been often attacked for passing as straight while also being accused of imitating heteronormativity for pairing with a butch partner. In Nestle's text on femme identity, "The Femme Question", she challenges this commonly held belief by stating that butch–femme relationships are "filled with a deeply lesbian language of stance, dress, gesture, love, courage and autonomy." Arlene Istar Lev argues that through their subversive appropriation of heteronormative gender roles, these identities were considered "complex erotic and social statements" rooted in "gendered erotic identities". Nestle states that they publicly declared same-sex love between women at a time when there was no liberation movement to support or protect them, and adds that "in the 1950s particularly, butch–femme couples were the front-line warriors against sexual bigotry. Because they were so visible, they suffered the brunt of street violence. The irony of social change has made a radical, sexual, political statement of the 1950s appear today a reactionary, non feminist experience."

== 1970s and 80s, and rejection of femme during lesbian feminism ==
Lesbian feminism saw a rejection of the butch–femme dynamic and therefore femme identity. During the emergence of lesbian feminism, femme lesbians were accused by prominent lesbian feminist figures of aping patriarchal beauty standards for wearing traditional feminine clothing. Black lesbian feminist poet and activist Audre Lorde wrote in Tar Beach that "butch and femme role playing was the very opposite of what we felt being gay was all about – the love of women".

Many bisexual women also active in the lesbian community felt pressured to identify as "lesbian", resulting in bisexual erasure factoring into the history of femme identities. This is further impacted by the fact that bisexual communities and the related bisexual movement did not formalize until the 1970s.

== 1990s and early 21st-century expansion of femme identity ==
=== General ===
During the 1990s and the emergence of the lipstick lesbian identity into the mainstream, femme became a catch-all term to describe a feminine lesbian. Citing research from the 1990s, Levitt and Bridges stated that the terms butch and femme "began infiltrating bisexual communities, and women began writing about their experiences as bisexual femmes", but also that "very little empirical research has been conducted looking at the expression and experience of gender expression and gender identity within bisexual women."

With expansion of the femme identity, sexual attraction differences between butches and femmes began to be analyzed. Scholars Cheris Kramarae and Dale Spender wrote, "Femme diversity is also manifested in the sexual arena. As many femmes may be attracted exclusively to butches, some are attracted to other femmes, and still others are also attracted to men and consider themselves bisexual." Some research has indicated that butches are more likely to be exclusively lesbian, while femmes are sometimes bisexual. In 2005, preliminary research conducted by Levitt and Bridges indicated that lesbians are more likely to identify as butch and have a more masculine gender expression than bisexual women. 4.5 percent of the bisexual women they studied identified as butch compared to the 30.1 percent of lesbians who did. Lesbians were more sexually attracted to women whose gender expressions contrasted theirs, and bisexual women were more sexually attracted to those whose gender expressions were more similar to theirs. Levitt and Bridges theorized that "this finding may be in part due to the different aesthetics that are available and popular within lesbian and bisexual communities."

The term femme has also been used to refer to gender non-conforming people who do not identify as lesbian or to transgender or non-binary people. In 1994, Kate Bornstein chronicled their experience as a gender non-conforming person who is a femme lesbian in their book Gender Outlaw. Praising the publication of Ivan Coyote's Persistence: All Ways Butch and Femme in 2011, Bornstein said, "The butch/femme dynamic is a conscious, loving binary of desire and trust ... it's a dance of love and outlawed romance. Butches and femmes share a sense of tribe, extended family and kinship—no matter what our genders might be." Since the late 2010s, influenced by the emergence of queer and transgender culture on sites such as Tumblr, Everyday Feminism, and Autostraddle, femme has been expanded to describe feminine people across gender and sexuality categories including heterosexual women, cisgender men and transfeminine people.

The postmodern queer conception of femme is a femme-identified person who does not always dress or act in a "traditionally feminine" (meaning a feminine aesthetic, such as wearing makeup, heels, and numerous accessories) way, but who expresses femme identity through feminine-associated behaviours, interactions and political views. Rather than an erotic identity rooted in lesbian women's culture, queer femme has been reframed into a political identity that is inclusive of all who wish to identify with it, feminine-presenting or not. As femme has moved into the mainstream, it has also been connected to notions of emotional labor, witchcraft and self-empowerment.

Based on the understanding of femme as describing a person (not necessarily a woman) who presents femininely, the expression "women and femmes" is sometimes used, but it has been criticized as conflating two different categories of identity.

Femme has also been used to describe a form of contemporary feminism which rejects the gender binary and acknowledges that individuals can fall anywhere within the gender spectrum, resulting in the possibility to be gender-less, gender-fluid, femme or masculine of center. Often using the phrase "women and femmes", adherents to this definition of femme believe that misogyny is used not only against women to inflict theoretical and physical violence but primarily against all feminine people. Connecting cisgendered male violence to toxic masculinity, they believe that patriarchy not only negatively affects female-identified people but men as well.

Many prominent femme-identified voices in mainstream media tend to be transfeminine and or non-binary individuals. The term femme is also essential to ballroom culture through the terms butch queen and femme queen, denoting a gay man and transgender woman respectively.

=== Use of femme by bisexual women ===
By the 1990s, the term femme had additionally been adopted by bisexual women. Citing research from the 1990s, Levitt and Bridges stated that the terms butch and femme "began infiltrating bisexual communities, and women began writing about their experiences as bisexual femmes", but also that "very little empirical research has been conducted looking at the expression and experience of gender expression and gender identity within bisexual women."

It has however also been argued by bi+ and other queer activists that since the term bisexual is relatively newer than lesbian, and the term bisexual as a sexual orientation only began to take shape in the mid-19th century, bisexual women historically once formed part of the lesbian community and thus used the term femme as a sub-group of lesbians. This argument posits that the claim that only women with no attraction to men have identified as femmes is ahistoric.

While today there is a common consensus that the term lesbian refers to women who exclusively feel attraction towards women and femmes, the term has carried various changing implications and expansive interpretations throughout history, particularly with the rise of political lesbianism in 1979.

Hence, the adoption of femme by bisexuals in the 1990s is considered by some to be a re-adoption by a portion of the same community following the distinction between lesbians and bisexual women and the lesbian separatist movement of the 1970s.

=== Femme identities online ===
Theorists have used aesthetics to analyze and addresses the evolution of the word "femme" throughout the 21st century. Femme theorist Andi Schwartz uses comparisons of modern and historical associations of the femme identity to outline "soft femme theory." She asserts that in the mid-to-late 20th century, "femme" was used to describe rough, badass women. Today, however, especially on social media, the word "femme" is used to describe the "soft, sad girl" trope that is commonly seen online and in trending fashions. While Schwartz offers a critique of this aesthetic and the erasure of pre-internet femme identities, she also considers how "performing softness" as an identifier for femininity, both on and offline, can be effective in transgressing hegemonic gender norms.

==== Use of fem(me) by gay men ====
From the 70s through 90s, gay male culture included the phrase "No Fats, No Femmes", and that persists in queer dating culture today. Constrained by character limitations on gay hookup apps such as Grindr and Scruff, "fem", "femm", and "femme" are used as an abbreviation for feminine. The ubiquitous phrase "No Fats, No Fems", indicating that a user does not want to be contacted by men of a certain size or feminine men, has been challenged by some in the gay community for perpetuating homonormative beauty ideals. "Fem" is used as a descriptor of one's appearance or mannerisms.

== Lesbian femme erasure ==
The contemporary queer concepts of femme have been challenged by lesbians who still use the term based on its original meaning. With concern about the erasure of lesbian culture and history, it has been argued that taking a term from an already marginalised society is a form of misogynist appropriation that undervalues lesbian identities, history and women's autonomy to self-identify outside patriarchal structures.

In her paper, Femme Theory: Refocusing the Intersectional Lens, femme theorist Rhea Hoskin offers an intersectional framework of femme theory and addresses the capabilities of subversive femininities. She uses an intersectional lens to address discourse surrounding femme-phobia and the ways in which this issue is not taken seriously as a form of oppression within the queer community and especially in academic feminist queer spaces.

== See also ==
- Dyke (slang)
