= Gender expression =

External manifestation of gender identity

Gender expression or gender presentation is a person's behavior, mannerisms, and appearance that are socially associated with gender, namely femininity or masculinity. Gender expression can also be defined as the external manifestation of one's gender identity through behavior, clothing, hairstyles, voice, or body characteristics. Typically, a person's gender expression is thought of in terms of masculinity and femininity, but an individual's gender expression may incorporate both feminine and masculine traits, or neither. A person's gender expression may or may not match their assigned sex at birth. This includes gender roles, and accordingly relies on cultural stereotypes about gender. It is distinct from gender identity.

== Terminology ==
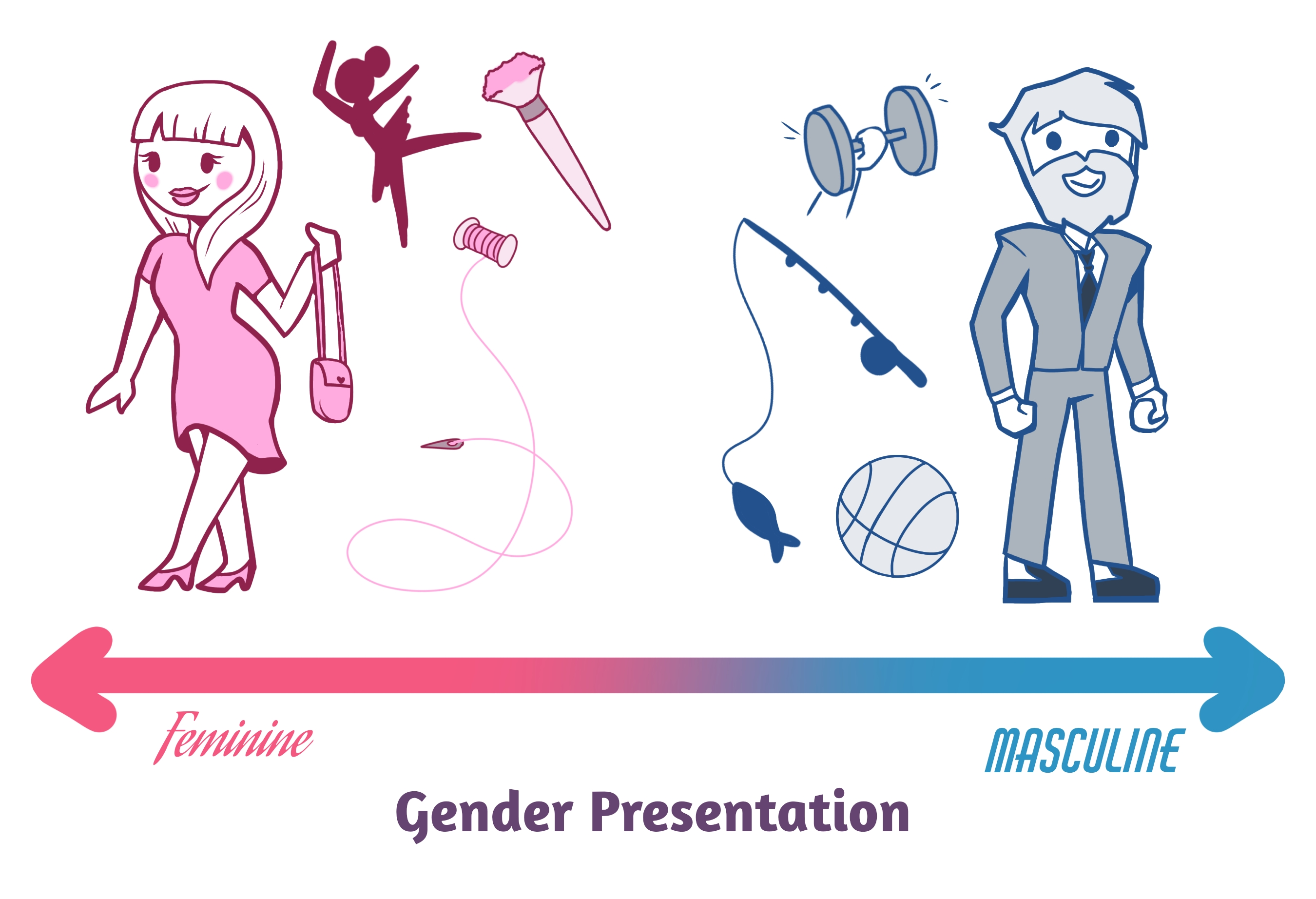
A drawing showing examples of stereotypical Western gender presentation

Gender expression typically reflects a person's gender identity (their internal sense of their own gender), but this is not always the case. Gender expression is separate and independent both from sexual orientation and sex assigned at birth. Gender identity can be expressed through behavior, clothing, hair, makeup, voice, body language and other aspects of one's external appearance. Gender expression does not always fall in line with a person's gender identity. A type of gender expression that is considered atypical for a person's externally perceived gender may be described as gender non-conforming.

Gender expression can vary widely between individuals and cultures, and may not always align with traditional gender roles or expectations. Some people may express their gender in a way that is typically associated with the opposite sex, such as a man wearing a dress or a woman having short hair and wearing masculine clothing. Others may prefer a gender-neutral or androgynous appearance, or may choose to present differently depending on the situation or context.

In men and boys, masculine gender expression is often described as manly, while atypical or feminine expression is known as effeminate. In girls and young women, atypically masculine expression is called tomboyish. In lesbian and queer women, masculine and feminine expressions are known as butch and femme respectively. A mixture of typical and atypical expression may be described as androgynous.

The term gender expression is used in the Yogyakarta Principles, which concern the application of international human rights law in relation to sexual orientation, gender identity, gender expression, and sex characteristics. The term also part of the criteria for human rights protection in certain countries, including Canada.

== Versus sexual orientation ==
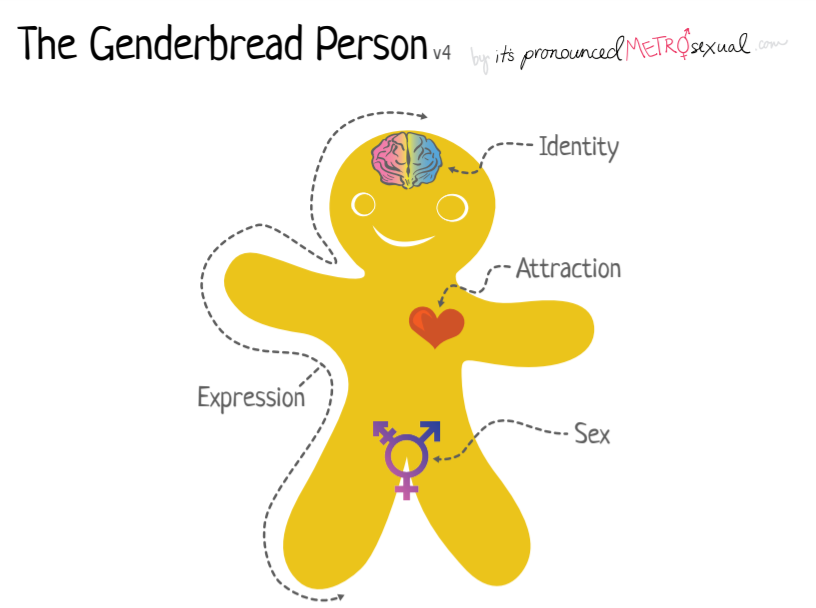
The Genderbread Person, a depiction of an understanding of the difference between gender expression, gender identity, sexual attraction and biological sex

While gender expression does not necessarily connect to sexuality, individuals often are misinterpreted as more masculine if lesbian and more feminine if gay, regardless of the individual's gender expression. These beliefs can lead to people misinterpreting an individual's gender expression based on their sexuality. Studies on adolescents conducted show that gay and lesbian individuals who did not express themselves as their assigned gender were seen as less acceptable. Individuals who expressed themselves with their assigned gender typically faced less social harassment and discrimination. On the other hand, heterosexual males whose gender expression was more feminine than masculine were the most discriminated against.

Some sexologists, especially earlier on in the 20th century, viewed being gay or lesbian as a form of gender inversion. It was thought that same sex attraction meant the person was actually the opposite gender and trapped in the wrong body. This idea was seen in figures in 1950s New York gay culture: effeminate men referred to as "fairies", as well as butch lesbians. Drag shows also can be considered a way that modifying one's gender expression that may indicate their sexuality, though this is not always the case. Research shows homosexual people are generally more gender nonconforming than heterosexual people, and gender nonconformity throughout life can be an indicator of sexuality.

The heterosexual matrix theory created by gender studies scholar Judith Butler says that people often assume someone's sexuality based on their visible gender and sex. It is one explanation why people tend to assume someone's gender expression based on their sex and sexuality.

== Discrimination ==
People sometimes face discrimination because of their gender expression. Victims of discrimination often culturally express different genders than their gender identity or biological sex. Gender expression-based discrimination can be independent of sexual orientation, and it can lead to bullying, childhood abuse, sexual assault, discrimination, and various other traumatizing hardships.

Discrimination based on sexual orientation can be connected to a person's gender expression. Scholars say it is difficult to separate the connection between anti-LGBTQ discrimination and gender expression, especially when the expression differs from the person's assigned gender at birth. In a study done by Steph M. Anderson, she found that in discriminatory situations, participants' gender affected whether or not they were perceived as LGBTQ. People whose expression aligned with their assigned gender felt less of an impact than those whose expression did not align with their assigned gender.

LGBTQ students often experienced higher rates of bullying, discrimination, and mental health issues. A study conducted in Spain, 2021 showed individuals that were part of the LGBTQI+ community had to deal with sexual harassment or discrimination and increased risk of violence. Conducting a study was challenging due to how people were manifesting ways to hurt the LGBTQ community. Some examples provided were verbal violence, homophobic jokes, anti-LGBTQ paintings, social distancing, etc.Research show that LGBTQ students "do not feel comfortable sharing their sexual identities" and "resort to changing their behavior to pass off as straight". It allows a way to protect themself against harassment and discrimination.

When it comes to health care, one study shows that people with a non-normative gender expression experienced biases during their care. For example, lesbians who presented femininely may be more comfortable in healthcare spaces than people whose expression does not match their assigned gender. Some gender non-conforming people in the study expressed feelings that having one's gender or sexuality assumed because of their expression limited their comfort and access to healthcare.

Gender expression is a sizable aspect of how a person views themselves, and thus will impact self confidence. When an individual is forced, for personal or societal influences, to portray themselves in a manner they do not personally identify with, confidence can be greatly hindered in turn damaging mental health. A 2017 study reported that when masculine presenting lesbians are made to dress in a feminine style, their confidence suffers greatly.

Similarly, a study indicated that straight men tend to express more negative attitudes towards feminine men compared to masculine gay men, which reflects traditional gender norms. Regardless of gender expression, when the male gender role is observed to be more feminine, it also reflects with increased negative attitudes towards homosexual individuals.

== Related terms ==
Other, rarer terms exist for aspects of gender expression. In academic sources, a feminine gender expression in a male (of any orientation) may be called gynemimesis (adjective: gynemimetic). The converse is andromimesis (adj.: andromimetic).

== See also ==
- Anti-gender movement
- Bem Sex-Role Inventory
- Discrimination against non-binary people
- Cross-dressing
- Drag (clothing)
- Dual-role transvestism
- Feminization (activity)
- Gender bender
- Otokonoko
- Outline of transgender topics
- Transsexual
- Transvestite
- Travesti (theatre)

== Bibliography ==
- Anderson, Steph M (2020). "Gender Matters: The Perceived Role of Gender Expression in Discrimination Against Cisgender and Transgender LGBQ Individuals". Psychology of Women Quarterly.
- Hillman, Betty Luther (2011). " "The most profoundly revolutionary act a homosexual can engage in": Drag and the Politics of Gender Presentation in the San Francisco Gay Liberation Movement, 1964–1972 ". Journal of the History of Sexuality.
- Klára Bártová; Zuzana Štěrbová; Marco Antonio Correa Varella; Jaroslava Varella Valentova (2020). "Femininity in men and masculinity in women is positively related to sociosexuality". Personality and Individual Differences.
- Serano, Julia (2016). Whipping Girl: A transsexual woman on sexism and the scapegoating of femininity (2nd ed.), Berkeley, CA: Seal Press.
