= 2023 Target Pride Month merchandise backlash =

Backlash and boycott due to LGBTQ+ merchandise

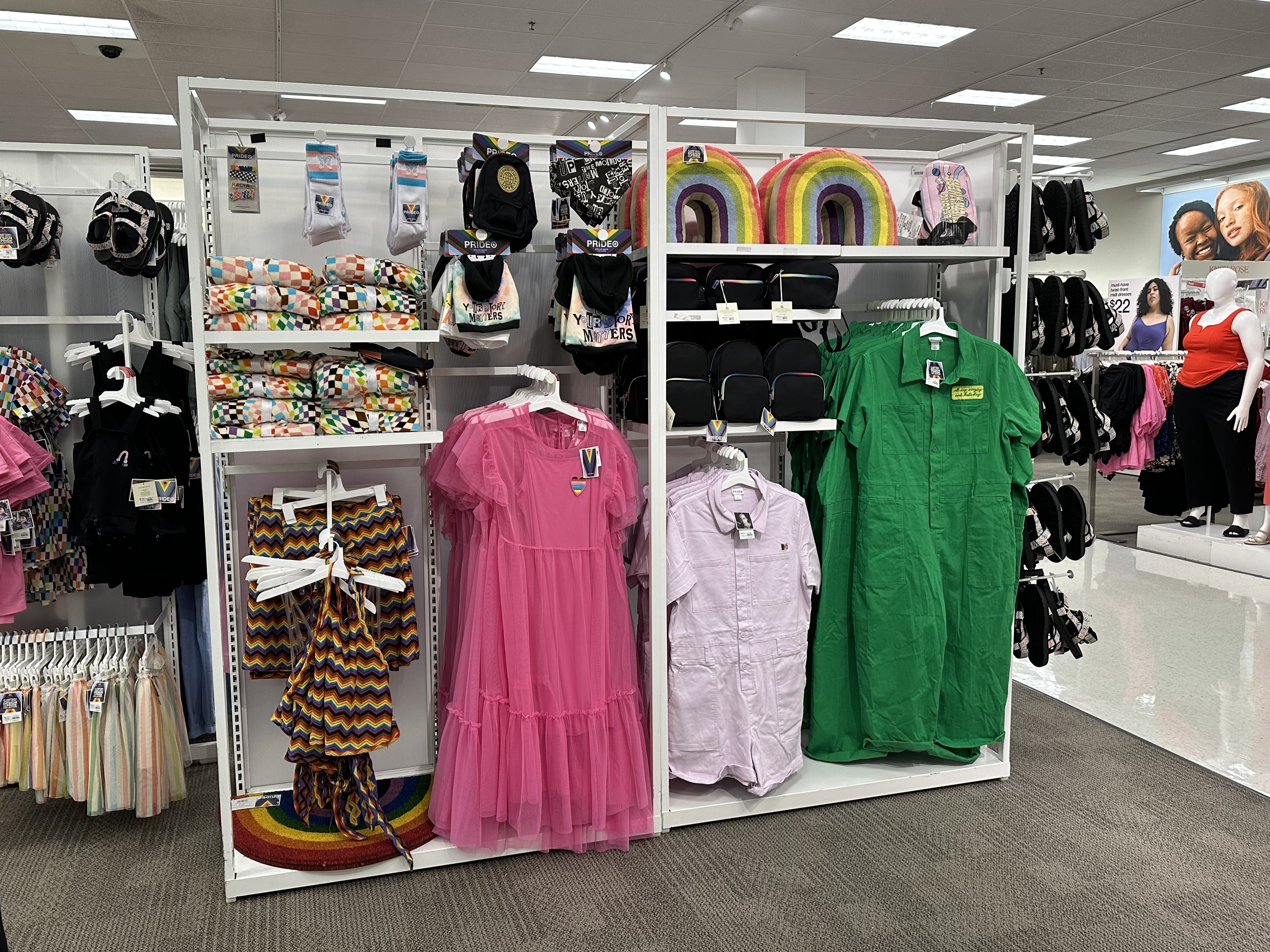
Target's 2023 Pride collection in Dadeland Station, Florida, moved to the back of the store.

A backlash against Target occurred in the lead up to Pride Month in 2023 after the American retailer released its Pride month merchandise, sparking attacks and threats from conservative anti-LGBTQ groups. It led to a decrease in Target sales and its stock price. The following year, in May 2024, Target announced that not all stores would carry its 2024 pride collection. The controversy was a prominent factor that led to the decline of rainbow capitalism.

== Background ==
In May 2023, Target received threats against employees in response to the stores' Pride Month merchandise. Several viral posts on social media claimed that "tuck-friendly" products were being sold to children; this claim was found to be false by the Associated Press. Additionally, the musician Forgiato Blow released a song titled "Boycott Target".

As a result of the outrage among anti-LGBTQ groups, Target decided to withdraw several pieces of merchandise from stores in southern states and from their website. The company also decided to move its pride displays in some stores from entrance areas to the back. Target released a statement on May 24, 2023, in which it cited concern for the safety of its employees as justification for these changes.

== Response ==
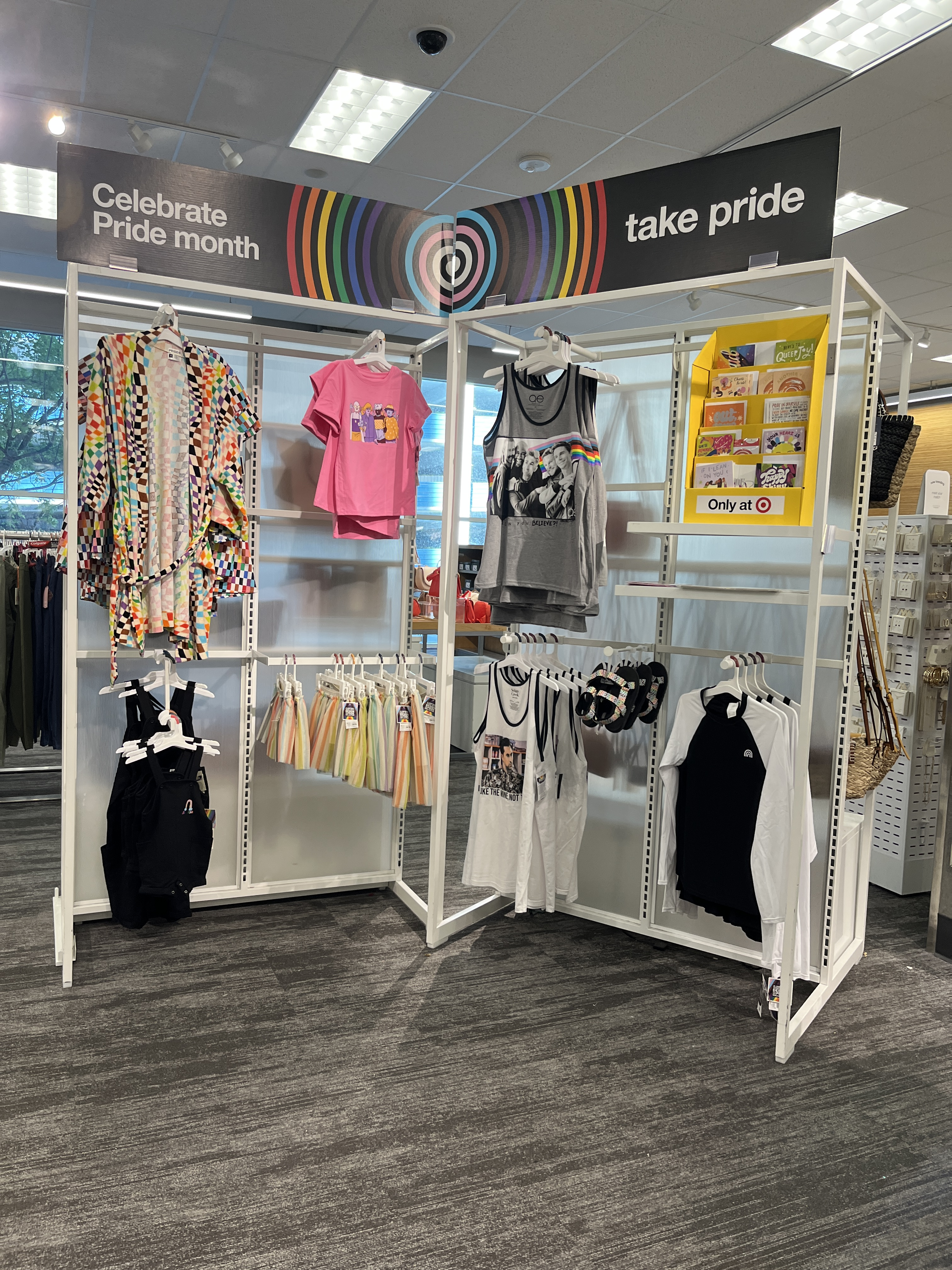
Pride collection at a Target store in Seattle, Washington, in June 2023

Following Target's response, the company faced harsh criticism from GLAAD and several other LGBTQ+ advocacy groups, who requested that Target return all merchandise removed from its stores and website and to release a statement to reaffirm their commitment to the LGBTQ+ community.

Several politicians, including California Governor Gavin Newsom, spoke out in support of the LGBTQ+ community and accused Target CEO Brian Cornell of "selling out the LGBTQ+ community to extremists".

Kelley Robinson, President of the Human Rights Campaign, wrote that "the LGBTQ+ community has celebrated Pride with Target for the past decade. Target needs to stand with us and double-down on their commitment to us".

Michael Edison Hayden, spokesperson for the Southern Poverty Law Center, told NPR that "Target's reversal would only serve to encourage more violent threats."

Target did not release any further statements or support for the LGBTQ+ community following the backlash. Within the week following the backlash, the stock price of Target had dropped by 15%.

Other retailers, including Walmart, released statements that they would not change their Pride Month offerings in response to the backlash against Target.

In an interview with Salon, senior director of programs and corporate advocacy of the Human Rights Campaign, Eric Bloem called out that "we're seeing a very coordinated planned attack on the LGBTQ+ community" and that the attacks against the LGBTQ+ community and companies that are supporting it are boosted by continued false claims being reported via media including Fox News. Despite false claims, hosts and guests have continued to spread misinformation about the Pride merchandise at Target in the week following the incident, according to Salon and Media Matters.

In late May 2023, several Target stores across the country were vandalized by far-right activists.

On June 10, 2023, several bomb threats were made against Target in multiple states by an individual who accused Target of having "betrayed the LGBT community", causing several evacuations. Police did not find any suspicious or harmful items, but are working with the FBI to try to identify the senders. The police have not identified who was behind the threats.

On June 16, 2023, a coalition of 15 state Attorneys General led by Massachusetts Attorney General Andrea Joy Campbell and Minnesota Attorney General Keith Ellison and co-signed by AGs from Arizona, California, Connecticut, Delaware, the District of Columbia, Illinois, Maine, Nevada, New Jersey, New York, Rhode Island, Vermont, and Washington State, expressed their resolute and unequivocal support for the LGBTQIA+ community. They supported Target in reporting all threats and vandalism committed against their Pride displays to law enforcement. They also requested that Target return the removed merchandise back to stores.

On July 5, 2023, a coalition of 7 Republican state Attorneys General led by Indiana Attorney General Todd Rokita, and joined by the attorneys general of Arkansas, Idaho, Kentucky, Mississippi, Missouri, and South Carolina, sent a letter to Target warning that marketing of materials featured in the Pride campaigns to children could run afoul of their states' child protection and obscenity laws.

On August 18, 2023, Target's chief growth officer Christina Hennington commented on the decline in sales during a conference call with analysts, stating that "The reaction is a signal for us to pause, adapt and learn so that our future approach to these moments balances celebration, inclusivity and broad-based appeal." The statement was made after Target revealed that its Q2 sales had declined by more than 5%. Target's e-commerce sales fell more than 10% in the same quarter.

== Effects and aftermath ==
Coming right on the heels of the Bud Light boycott, Deseret News wrote after the Target controversy: "Conservatives have been struggling to find a foothold against corporate wokeism, the injection of politics and social issues into business. But the past two months seem to suggest the tide is turning — dramatically." Both events led to a muted Pride Month that year, intensifying further in 2024, as brands and companies increasingly backed out of Pride sponsorships and open support.

In 2025, the newly appointed Attorney General of Florida James Uthmeier filed a lawsuit against Target stemming from the Pride Month backlash. The suit claims that Target "misled investors", resulting in monetary loss.

== See also ==
- 2020s anti-LGBT movement in the United States
- Rainbow capitalism
- Go woke go broke
- Pink money
- Cancel culture
- Diversity marketing
- Bud Light boycott
