= Bud Light boycott =

American conservative-led boycott

A boycott of Bud Light, the top beer brand in the United States, began in April 2023. The boycott began in response to a social media promotion the company conducted with actress and TikTok personality Dylan Mulvaney, a transgender woman.

On April 1, 2023, as part of a larger campaign to address Bud Light's decline in sales and attract younger audiences, Mulvaney promoted the company's Bud Light beer brand in a short video on her Instagram account during March Madness. The video triggered a backlash from American conservatives, including singer Kid Rock, who helped instigate a boycott against Bud Light and Anheuser-Busch more broadly. Proponents of the boycott described the sponsorship as "political" because it involved a transgender woman who had previously advocated for transgender rights. Several media outlets, including the Los Angeles Times and NBC News, described the backlash as anti-trans.

In the month following the advertisement, Bud Light's sales fell between 11 and 26%, while Anheuser-Busch's sales fell about 1%. In May 2023, AB InBev's stock price fell 20%, enough for it to be classified as a bear stock by Forbes. HSBC Securities downgraded its rating on the company from "Buy" to "Hold". CNBC estimated that in May AB InBev's sales fell 18%. In May 2023, it was estimated that Bud Light lost its status as the top-selling beer in the United States to Modelo Especial. According to former AB InBev executive Anson Frericks, by February 2025 sales had not recovered, remaining approximately 40% below pre-boycott levels.

== Background ==
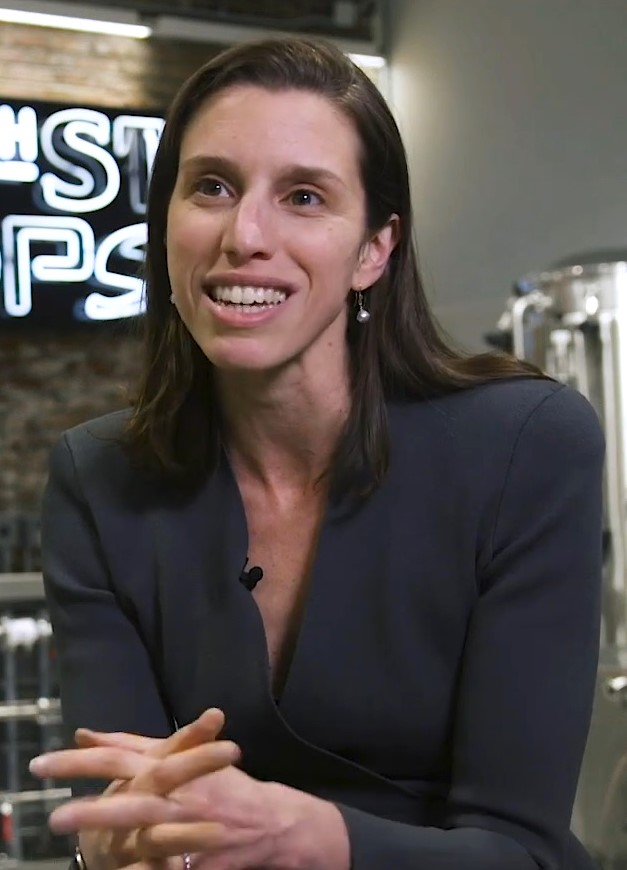
Alissa Heinerscheid in 2019

Economists have noted for some time that major light beers like Bud Light, Coors Light, and Miller Light are nearly indistinguishable. Since the beers are "essentially homogeneous products," manufacturers rely heavily on advertising to differentiate their brands and build customer loyalty. AB InBev, for example, spends about twice as much on advertising as a percentage of sales revenue than the average American firm.

Amidst the ensuing controversy, critics blamed Bud Light's new vice president of marketing, Alissa Heinerscheid, as responsible for the brand's move. Heinerscheid, who became a vice president at the company in July 2022, stated that her goal was to evolve the Bud Light advertising to make it more inclusive, and to move it away from its "fratty and out-of-touch humor". In a March 23, 2023, interview for Make Yourself at Home, a show hosted by Kristin Twiford, Heinerscheid stated:

... this brand is in decline. It has been in decline for a really long time. And if we do not attract young drinkers to come and drink this brand, there will be no future for Bud Light ... It's like, we need to evolve and elevate this incredibly iconic brand. And my ... what I brought to that was a belief in, okay, what does evolve and elevate mean? It means inclusivity. It means shifting the tone. It means having a campaign that's truly inclusive and feels lighter and brighter and different and appeals to women and to men.

=== Dylan Mulvaney ===
Dylan Mulvaney is an American social media personality, best known for her "Days of Girlhood" video series on TikTok. Mulvaney is a transgender woman, and she has documented her gender transition in the series starting in March 2022. Her videos soon became viral on TikTok, and she swiftly amassed a large following.

Mulvaney began to be subject to significant criticism and controversy among American conservatives in October 2022. In that month, she collaborated with genderfluid hairstylist David Lopez in a podcast for Ulta Beauty; the incident led to calls amongst conservatives for a boycott against the beauty store chain. Later that month, she interviewed US president Joe Biden for the left-wing NowThis News. The interview subsequently went viral amongst conservatives and Mulvaney began to face greater scrutiny from the American right. Mulvaney was criticized by several high-profile Republicans and right-wing personalities including Marsha Blackburn, Caitlyn Jenner, and Marjorie Taylor Greene.

Former Anheuser-Busch executive Anson Frericks wrote that Heinerscheid's ad campaign utilizing Mulvaney was fueled by ESG and DEI initiatives begun by InBev's new CEO, Michel Doukeris.

== Mulvaney sponsorship ==
External videos
- Dylan Mulvaney's promotional video for Bud Light
- via Instagram
- – Post by Mulvaney (April 1, 2023)

On April 1, 2023, Mulvaney uploaded a video to her Instagram in which she was dressed as Audrey Hepburn's character in Breakfast at Tiffany's. In the video, Mulvaney states: "So, I kept hearing about this thing called March Madness, and I thought we were all just having a hectic month! But it turns out it has something to do with sports. And I'm not sure exactly which sport, but either way it's a cause to celebrate." She then displayed a commemorative can sent by the company, featuring her face and the text "Cheers to 365 Days of Being a Woman." She added that Bud Light was giving fans a chance to win US$15,000.

== Boycott ==
The partnership faced a rebuff from the American right and anti-trans groups, who called for a boycott of Bud Light and its parent company Anheuser-Busch. Immediate scrutiny came as social media posts responded to the sponsored video. According to The Washington Post, the advertisement led figures in right-wing media, such as Fox News, to refer to Mulvaney in "disparaging and often in transphobic terms nearly a dozen times over the next three days".

External videos
- Country singer Kid Rock records himself firing at several Bud Light cases with an MP5.
- via Twitter
- – Video by Kid Rock (April 3, 2023)

A boycott was carried out, with many consumers opting to not purchase Bud Light or any Anheuser-Busch products at bars or stores. Many conservative commentators, politicians, and celebrities participated in the boycott, as they opposed the endorsement by Mulvaney, a transgender person. On April 3, 2023, conservative country singer Kid Rock filmed himself shooting three cases of Bud Light with an MP5 submachine gun, while wearing a MAGA hat, exclaiming "Fuck Bud Light and fuck Anheuser-Busch." As of May 6, 2023, the video had been viewed more than 11 million times.

Another country artist, Travis Tritt, joined Kid Rock in calling for the boycott. He pulled all Anheuser-Busch products from his upcoming concert tour, stating that Anheuser-Busch was "[a] great American company that later sold out to the Europeans and became unrecognizable to the American consumer. Such a shame." He was joined shortly after by conservative rock musician Ted Nugent, who called Anheuser-Busch's Dylan Mulvaney partnership "the epitome of cultural deprivation", and vowed to "never allow any Anheuser-Busch products anywhere near my world". He also applauded Kid Rock for calling the boycott. John Rich, a country music singer-songwriter, announced he would no longer be selling Anheuser-Busch products at his Nashville bar.

Videos on TikTok and Twitter circulated across the internet, depicting people who were smashing, throwing away, and driving over Bud Light bottles. Several threats were made to Anheuser-Busch factories during the boycott, including various bomb threats that forced certain factories to close.

After Anheuser-Busch attempted to distance itself from Mulvaney in response, members of the LGBT community started their own boycott of the company, led by several prominent gay bars in Chicago.

In April 2023, Florida Governor and Republican presidential candidate Ron DeSantis criticized Bud Light's association with Mulvaney as part of a trend of "woke companies" that were "trying to change our country", stating that "pushback is in order across the board".

Anheuser-Busch's former President of Sales, Anson Frericks, has repeatedly given interviews in Fox Business calling for President Brendan Whitworth to step down or be fired for the advertising campaign and failure to remediate the brand's public perception in its aftermath. In addition, Billy Busch, heir to the fortune of Anheuser-Busch co-founder Adolphus Busch, has blamed the company's drastic drop in sales on its leadership, namely Brendan Whitworth.

== Response ==
=== Statements from Anheuser-Busch ===
Anheuser-Busch's immediate response to the boycott was the following statement: "From time to time, we produce unique commemorative cans for fans and for brand influencers, like Dylan Mulvaney. This commemorative can was a gift to celebrate a personal milestone and is not for sale to the general public." Citing safety concerns due to the backlash, Anheuser-Busch canceled all of their Budweiser Clydesdales events indefinitely. An AB InBev executive stated: "No one at a senior level was aware this was happening." It was also alleged that AB InBev would be pausing all influencer marketing deals until more robust vetting procedures could be implemented. Anheuser-Busch's CEO Brendan Whitworth issued the following statement:

We never intended to be part of a discussion that divides people. We are in the business of bringing people together over a beer. My time serving this country taught me the importance of accountability and the values upon which America was founded: freedom, hard work and respect for one another. As CEO of Anheuser-Busch, I am focused on building and protecting our remarkable history and heritage. I care deeply about this country, this company, our brands and our partners. I spend much of my time traveling across America, listening to and learning from our customers, distributors and others. Moving forward, I will continue to work tirelessly to bring great beers to consumers across our nation.

Whitworth's statement was met with criticism as it neither directly supported Mulvaney nor disavowed the advertisement.

On April 17, 2023, responding to the boycott, Anheuser-Busch rolled out a revised advertising campaign featuring Clydesdale horses against the backdrop of rural, small town American landscapes. On April 21, 2023, Anheuser-Busch issued a statement that Heinerscheid, who had taken a leave of absence since the controversy began, would be removed from her position as vice president and replaced with their Vice President of Global Marketing, Todd Allen, known for leading the push to allow alcohol to be sold at the 2022 FIFA World Cup in Qatar. The company also hired two Washington, D.C.-based conservative political consultant groups to advise the brand moving forward. A second executive, Daniel Blake, who was Heinerscheid's supervisor, was also placed on leave in the aftermath of the controversy. An Anheuser-Busch spokesperson told The Wall Street Journal: "Given the circumstances, Alissa has decided to take a leave of absence which we support. Daniel has also decided to take a leave of absence."

On June 28, 2023, Brendan Whitworth gave an interview to CBS, where he highlighted Bud Light's history of supporting the queer community since 1998 and stressed their commitment to continuing to support them. He also stated that Bud Light's parent company, Anheuser-Busch, was planning on tripling Bud Light's budget for the 2023 NFL season. Lastly, he lamented the financial damage done to Bud Light's distributors, wholesalers, and other employees.

On October 31, 2023, AB InBev CEO Michel Doukeris stated that the company will be shifting to universal themes, stating:

Consumers continue to want the Bud Light brand to concentrate on the platforms that all consumers love, and we are doing just that through investing in partnerships with the NFL, Fields of Honor, news platforms, college football, and our recently announced return to partnering with the UFC. Two, they want Bud Light to focus on beer.

However, Bud Light's new partnership with the UFC has garnered more negative attention to the company, specifically from pro-LGBT communities after UFC fighter Sean Strickland, who has expressed disdain for the transgender community, tweeted after the partnership was announced that he was going to "fix" Bud Light and "save the day."

=== Other responses ===
Shortly after the boycott began, radio personality Howard Stern questioned the backlash against Mulvaney on his SiriusXM radio show, saying he wished he could ask Kid Rock: "Why are you so upset about this? How is it hurtful?" Country musician Zach Bryan quoted Tritt's song "It's a Great Day to Be Alive" in his condemnation of the other artists' backlash, saying "I just think insulting transgender people is completely wrong because we live in a country where we can all just be who we want to be. It's a great day to be alive I thought." Garth Brooks shared that his bar would continue to serve Bud Light products, and that he believed in "inclusiveness" and "diversity". Singer-songwriter Jason Isbell directly responded to Kid Rock's tweets, sarcastically sharing past Coors Light advertising which supported LGBT causes.

Donald Trump Jr. called for an end to the boycott in April 2023, stating that he was not in favor of "destroying an American, iconic company" over "the stupidity of someone in a marketing campaign". He further cited their record of donating more to conservative politicians as a reason to end the boycott.

Former President Donald Trump defended Anheuser-Busch in 2024 and called for giving the company a "second chance", prior to a fundraiser with a company lobbyist.

Former NBA star and Naismith Memorial Basketball Hall of Fame member Charles Barkley has also spoken against the boycott.

=== Mulvaney response ===
In June 2023, Mulvaney said that Bud Light did not support her following the backlash to the advertisement, adding that "For months now, I've been scared to leave my house ...I have been ridiculed in public. I've been followed, and I have felt a loneliness that I wouldn't wish on anyone." In a company statement, Bud Light did not directly respond to Mulvaney, but said that they remain "committed to the programs and partnerships we have forged over decades with organizations across a number of communities, including those in the LGBTQ+ community."

== Impact ==
=== Effect on sales ===
In the week ending April 8, 2023, Bud Light had reportedly experienced an 11% drop in sales, and a 21% drop in the week ending April 15, 2023. As of May 1, 2023, Bud Light "off-premise sales" had dropped 26% since the start of the boycott. At a shareholder meeting on May 4, 2023, Anheuser-Busch InBev's CEO Michel Doukeris distanced the company from Mulvaney saying "this was one can, one influencer, one post and not a campaign." Doukeris also said that the drop in sales "would represent around 1 percent of our overall global volumes for that period". Doukeris said the company would increase support to wholesalers and triple Bud Light's advertising budget in an attempt to recover lost sales.

On May 10, HSBC downgraded its rating of AB InBev from "Buy" to "Hold" amidst the boycott. Additionally, the boycott had begun to affect the sales of Anheuser-Busch's other brands with an 11.4% sales hit to their flagship Budweiser brand, and a 4.4% drop of Grupo Modelo sales. This is on top of the roughly 21.4% drop in sales of Bud Light. Constellation Brands owns the exclusive licensing and distribution rights for Grupo Modelo brands in the United States.

In mid-May, Republican Senators Ted Cruz and Marsha Blackburn opened a Senate investigation into Anheuser-Busch's partnership with Mulvaney, citing as particular points of cause Mulvaney's use of the word "girlhood" in the title of her TikTok series, her references to herself as a girl, and concerns over whether the partnership was intended to market alcoholic beverages to children. In late August 2023, Anheuser-Busch would face criticism from Cruz for stonewalling the investigation while Armstrong Williams assessed that using a TikTok influencer showed a clear intent to market to underage children.

Responding to Anheuser-Busch's alleged failure to support Mulvaney during the boycott, the Human Rights Campaign Foundation rescinded the company's top rating for LGBTQ+ equality in May 2023.

By the end of May, the terms "Bud Lighted" and "Bud Lighting" began to circulate on the internet to describe a boycott whose "strategy is to crush so-called rainbow capitalism by branding companies as "woke" and calling for boycotts over everything from Adidas' gender-inclusive swimwear to a The North Face marketing campaign featuring drag queen and environmentalist Pattie Gonia."

Also at the end of that month, AB InBev stock shares fell by 20% from where it was before the boycott and had begun to be considered a bear stock by Forbes. In total, $26 billion had been removed from their market valuation, as rival Molson Coors' stock valuation rose 19%. Meanwhile, HSBC cut AB InBev stock to a hold. HSBC analyst Carlos Laboy explained the decision's thought process "It is unclear how ABI will reverse eroding US volume and brand relevance, and fix distributors' trust, without leadership changes."

Sales volume for Bud Light fell 29.5% in the week ending May 20, 2023. Besides the growth in Molson Coors, sales of products owned by the Boston Beer Company also surged since the boycott began. Late May also saw AB InBev double down on their pro-LGBTQ+ outlook, donating $200,000 to the National LGBT Chamber of Commerce. The company also attempted to patch their sales figures by offering $15 rebates with the purchase of a 15-pack and slashing prices to $3.49 for a 24-pack.

MarketWatch reported that May was the single worst month in AB InBev's history, correlating to the single largest selloff of AB InBev stock due to a 17% overall drop in sales, with Bud Light dropping in sales by 28%, Budweiser by 16%, Busch by 12%, and Michelob Ultra by 10%. MarketWatch also noted that AB InBev's rival, Molson Coors, had seen their products sale dramatically increase. Noting a 16% increase in Coors Light, 15% increase in Miller Lite, and Yuengling, an independent brewery in collaboration with Molson Coors, had sales jump 32%. CNN called the boycott "a self induced injury that torpedoed sales".

On June 3, Brayden King, a professor of management and organizations, gave an interview to CNBC calling the Bud Light boycott an outlier in the right's attack on "woke capitalism" because it is the first one to actually harm the company's sales. King studied 133 political boycotts from 1990 to 2005 and none of them accounted for more than a 1% drop in sales for a company; the Bud Light boycott had resulted in an estimated 18% drop in all AB InBev sales. CNBC also predicted that the boycott would only strengthen as June Pride Month began, and to expect Molson Coors stock to continue to climb. Also on June 3, Bud Light premiered a series of ads during the first game of the 2023 Stanley Cup Final which fell back on "macho" adverts "screaming masculinity" centering around the company releasing a limited run of Harley-Davidson partnered cans.

Former president of sales and distribution at Anheuser-Busch, Anson Frericks, noted that should the boycott remain strong for another month, retailers would have no choice but to begin reallocating their limited shelf space by relying on sales data from the preceding months.

Struggling sales and stock price, as well as a nearly $1 billion investment in Heineken N.V. by Bill Gates prior to the controversy, began to threaten AB InBev's position as the number 1 beer producer and distributor in the United States. Most of the industry had been anticipating Modelo Especial to overtake Bud Light in sales for some time, but the boycott accelerated the switch. In early June, Modelo Especial topped Bud Light as America's largest selling beer by revenue, after Bud Light had held the spot for 20 years. Forbes reported that AB InBev was facing a "permanent" 15% drop in their stock price that they would be unable to revert as the company's stock continued to slip.

Sales would continue to decline during the July 4th weekend, with Bud Light dropping to the 14th place in popularity, falling behind Pabst Blue Ribbon and Miller Lite. During the weekend Anheuser-Busch offered a $15 rebate on Bud-Light, effectively making it free. However, this was not enough to end the boycott as sales slid 23.6% over the weekend compared to 2022, as rivals such as Coors continued to climb in market share.

Anheuser-Busch's stocks would begin to stabilize in early August 2023 ending a nearly 5-month-long slide in their stock valuation. Additionally, a survey by Deutsche Bank in early August found that only 3% of Bud Light drinkers plan on boycotting the beer. However, people already boycotting the beer, which they assessed to be upwards of 30% of pre-boycott drinkers, were not surveyed. On September 13, AB InBev posted their first stock growth since the start of the boycott, at +0.04%, however, continued to struggle when compared to the growth of other beer brands.

On September 6, Bill Gates purchased 1.7 million shares (0.1% stake) of AB InBev valued at $95 million stating that he is confident in the brewer's future to recover from the boycott. Anson Frericks stated that his purchasing of AB InBev stock was an attempt to recover from his unsuccessful investment into Heineken earlier in the year.

TheStreet reported that the boycott on AB InBev products has been successful mostly due to consumers buying beers made by Molson-Coors or other companies, which does not impact the overall experience of drinking, and thus makes the boycott easy to maintain. Bank of America upgraded their stock ranking on September 29, 2023, arguing that the damage of the boycott is mostly passed. As a result, the AB InBev stock price saw its second best day in 2023, and their best day since the start of the boycott, up 3.3%. However, AB InBev saw its stock decline by 2.86% in the two weeks after.

By October 16, the total decline in AB InBev's revenue from sales since the start of the boycott came in as 10.5%. At the same time Yuengling reported that they have been consistently selling out their entire stock and seek to expand their distribution to the remaining 24 states where they aren't sold to fill the void of AB InBev and Bud-Light. On October 31 2023, AB InBev opened up about the exact sales figures, reporting a 13.5% decline in U.S. revenue and a 17.5% decline in U.S. sales and a total decline in volume of 3.4%; however, they reported continued growth, namely in Central America and Africa. Sales continued to decline and by July 2024 Bud Light had slipped to third place, behind Modelo Especial and Michelob Ultra. Bud Light represented 6.5% of US beer dollar sales at that time.

Sales continued to decline through 2025 and 2026, despite Bud Light advertising retrenching around more conservative-coded themes like UFC sponsorship. By 2026 AB InBev was cutting marketing spending for Bud Light and management was focusing attention on other brands. However, the Financial Times noted that sales had been declining before the boycott for a variety of reasons, including decreased alcohol consumption among young Americans, a health-driven shift towards lower calorie beers, and competition from cannabis products. Therefore, not all of the sales decline can be attributed to the boycott.

=== Effect on AB InBev ===
By July 2023, Bud Light's parent company AB InBev's shares had fallen to $58 per share, despite being at $66 in March 2023. In July 2023, Florida Governor Ron DeSantis called for AB InBev to be investigated by Florida's pension fund agency, as Florida's pension fund held over 680,000 shares in AB InBev. For the April-to-June quarter, AB InBev reported that its United States revenue had dropped by 10.5% from the previous year, primarily due to a volume decline in Bud Light. However, its global brands like Stella Artois and Corona contributed to an overall global revenue increase of 7.2% for the same period.

On July 27, 2023, AB InBev announced they would be laying off nearly 400 of their North American staff. The layoff, which consisted of about 2% of the company, comes following the decline in the company's stock prices and sales figures. CEO Brendan Whitworth clarified that the layoffs will mostly be located in the corporate front office and marketing team, and will not affect the brewers and distributors.

On August 8, 2023, Anheuser-Busch sold off several brands to the cannabis company Tilray. These included Shock Top, Breckenridge Brewery, Blue Point Brewing Company, 10 Barrel Brewing Company, Redhook Ale Brewery, Widmer Brothers Brewery, Square Mile Cider Company, and HiBall Energy. Anheuser-Busch cited a $400 million drop in revenue for the reason for the sale, which turned Tilray into the fifth largest craft beer producer in the United States. Following these property sales, Billy Busch, heir to the fortune of Adolphus Busch, offered to purchase the Bud Light brand from Anheuser-Busch.

== See also ==
- 2020s anti-LGBTQ movement in the United States
- 2023 Target Pride Month merchandise backlash
- Cancel culture
- Diversity marketing
- New Coke
- Rainbow capitalism
- Go woke, go broke, a catchphrase associated with such boycotts
- Boston Children's Hospital, which also received bomb threats due to an anti-trans backlash
