= Double Duty (disambiguation) =

Double Duty is competing in the Indianapolis 500 and Coca-Cola 600 on the same day.

Double Duty may also refer to:

- Double Duty Radcliffe (1902–2005), baseball player in the Negro leagues
- Double-duty dollar
- DoubleDuty, a task-switching utility for the TRS-80 Model 4 computer
