= P. B. Young =

American journalist

- Born: July 27, 1884; Littleton, North Carolina, U.S.
- Died: October 9, 1962 (aged 78); Norfolk, Virginia, U.S.
- Education: St. Augustine's College (1903-19050)
- Occupations: Editor, publisher, community leader
- Spouse: Eleanor White Young (m. 1906)
- Children: P. B. Young Jr., Thomas White Young
- Father: Winfield Young

Plummer Bernard Young Sr. (July 27, 1884 – October 9, 1962), better known as P. B. Young was a newspaper editor, publisher, community leader, and founder of the Norfolk Journal and Guide. He was African American.

== Early life and education ==
Plummer Bernard Young was born July 27, 1884, in Littleton, North Carolina. His father, Winfield Young, was born into slavery in 1848 in Halifax County, but learned to read and write under the tutelage of his master's wife. Between 1870 and 1880, Winfield and his young wife, Sallie Adams, moved from Halifax County into Littleton proper, where he ran a dry goods store. The Young family (Plummer had four older siblings) attended two black churches in Littleton: first Enon Baptist Church and later St. Anna's Episcopal Church, the church of Plummer's childhood. Plummer attended the elementary and secondary grades at Reedy Creek Academy, a Baptist-run private school set up to educate black children. In addition, Winfield tutored his son at the store when business was quiet.

In May 1884, Winfield Young founded the True Reformer, a weekly newspaper of Littleton. According to biographer Henry Lewis Suggs, Plummer "credited much of his learning to the True Reformer and to his employment as an errand boy for a local white daily."

In 1900, Plummer began receiving higher education at St. Augustine's University in Raleigh, North Carolina. In September 1902 he started classes in the normal department. The following year he was a student in the print shop, which he went on to supervise between 1904 and 1906. During this time, he continued to take classes, like math and history, part-time in the normal department.

While at St. Augustine's, Young met Eleanor Louise White, a preparatory department teacher. Eleanor, the adopted daughter of the college president, graduated from St. Augustine's in 1906, at which time she and Young married. The couple returned to Littleton, where their first son, Plummer Bernard Jr., was born in February 1907.

== Career ==
In June 1907, Young moved his family from Littleton, North Carolina, to Norfolk, Virginia, where he had accepted a job offer as a plant foreman for the Lodge Journal and Guide. Young's first order of business was to compel the Guide's owners, the Supreme Lodge Knights of Gideon, to replace their flat-bed, manual press with a slightly more modern, drum-cylinder power press. This, along with other small operational and editorial improvements, helped the weekly's circulation grow from 600 to 1,000 copies by the end of the year.

In 1909, after the resignation of editor J. Henry Cromwell, Young volunteered for and was given editorship of the Guide. The 24-year-old Young assumed editorial duties in addition to those of foreman. By 1910, the Gideons decided to sell the business, which Young purchased for $3,050. He made his brother Henry Cheatham a partner and plant foreman. In 1911, the business was granted a charter, with Young as president, Eleanor as treasurer, and Henry as secretary. Young changed the official name of the paper from the Lodge Journal and Guide to the Norfolk Journal and Guide. In December 1913, the Guide suffered a heavy loss, including its archive, when its Church Street plant was heavily damaged by fire. Operations moved twice between then and January 1917. By the end of 1919, the paper had grown to eight pages and circulation reached 4000. In addition to Young's wife and brother, the Guide also employed his sons Thomas and P. B. Jr. and his father, Winfield. Per biographer, Suggs, "The Guide, in short, was a family business."

Under Young's leadership, the Norfolk Journal and Guide grew to become one of the largest black newspapers in the United States. By 1928, it was the largest Southern black newspaper, and by the start of World War II, it was the single largest employer of black people in the South. By the war's end, it was the fourth-largest black newspaper in the United States, following the Pittsburgh Courier, the Afro-American, and The Chicago Defender.

=== Writing and views ===
Young described his approach to confronting racism and discrimination as non-confrontational: "I am definitely opposed to frontal attack. I believe in negotiation, arbitration, conciliation and persuasion. If that does not work I resort to the courts." During the 1920s, Young was a Republican, and he became a conservative Democrat during the 1930s.

Young frequently wrote for the newspaper and organized article series to campaign against contemporary racial issues. Young wrote against the Great Migration because it split the large labor force of black people in the South. He believed that the North's economic opportunities would only be temporary during World War I, with black workers inevitably fired after the war. He also warned readers of the hard trip and the lack of social privilege upon arrival. In this view, African Americans would be less collectively successful due to the migration than if they were able to grow and leverage their combined influence in the South. This stance disagreed with the takes of other black newspapers of the time.

Young wrote a series called "The Dirt Roads of Norfolk," calling for better housing, jobs, and schools for black residents of the city. He wrote that black residents paid taxes but did not receive commensurate benefits, with heavy traffic, unpaved streets, and poor sewage systems hurting the parts of the city where black people lived. Young frequently condemned Norfolk's segregation ordinances, and called upon black residents of the city to organize and campaign for these issues. He hosted meetings for local organizers to plan non-violent protests against city conditions. He also called for black citizens to mobilize their voting power.

Young frequently wrote to encourage attitudes of self-help among the local black community and called for the development of a "talented tenth" of black entrepreneurs who could help erode racial prejudice and discrimination against the rest of the black community. He organized entrepreneurial events and supported home ownership campaigns. During the 1920s he praised the intelligence and work ethic of the black population of Norfolk, while also claiming their wealth and salaries were some of the highest for black communities in the United States.

Young helped organize the Southern Conference on Race Relations at Durham, North Carolina in 1942. He also served as chairman. It outputted the Durham Manifesto, which condemned Jim Crow and called on liberal and moderate white people to help end racial discrimination. The document spawned commentary, more conferences, and action in the Southern civil rights movement, especially through the 1944 formation of the Southern Regional Council. During this time, Young was chairman of the board of trustees for Howard University, and in 1943, appointed to the new Federal Employment Practices Commission.

Young retired in 1946 and passed over management of the paper to his sons.

== Death and legacy ==
Plummer Bernard Young Sr. died October 9, 1962, in Norfolk General Hospital, Norfolk, Virginia. Eleanor White Young had died in 1946 and Plummer remarried in 1950 to Josephine Tucker Moseley. Plummer was survived by Josephine and by his sons, P. B. Jr. and Thomas W. Young. At the time, P. B. Jr. was editor-in-chief of the Guide and Thomas was president and general manager of the Guide Publishing Company.

Two days after his death, the editorial board of The Virginian-Pilot featured a tribute to Young calling him a newspaper publisher of "stability, courage, and persistence in seeking the betterment of the Negro minority for which he spoke, and a competence of craftsmanship that won him the respect of all newspapermen who read his newspaper."

In addition to receiving honorary degrees from many historically black colleges and universities, Young also served on the board of trustees of Hampton Institute, Hampton, Virginia; St. Paul's College, Lawrenceville, Virginia; Palmer Memorial Institute, Sedalia, North Carolina; and Howard University, Washington, D.C.. Young was also chairman of the Howard University board for six years.

== Honors and awards ==
- Honorary degree, Shaw University, Raleigh, North Carolina
- Honorary degree, Virginia Union University, Richmond, Virginia
- Honorary degree, Virginia State College, Ettrick, Virginia
- Honorary degree, Morehouse College, Atlanta, Georgia
- Honorary degree, Tuskegee Institute, Tuskegee, Alabama

In 1995, the North Carolina Department of Natural and Cultural Resources erected a historical marker on U.S. Route 158 in Littleton, North Carolina, to commemorate Young's life and achievements.

== See also ==
- Claude Albert Barnett - fellow African American publisher and Young contemporary
- William Washington Browne - founder of the Grand Fountain of the United Order of True Reformers
- National Newspaper Publishers Association - formerly the National Negro Publishers Association
