= Rainbow capitalism =

Capitalist appropriation and assimilation of sexual diversity

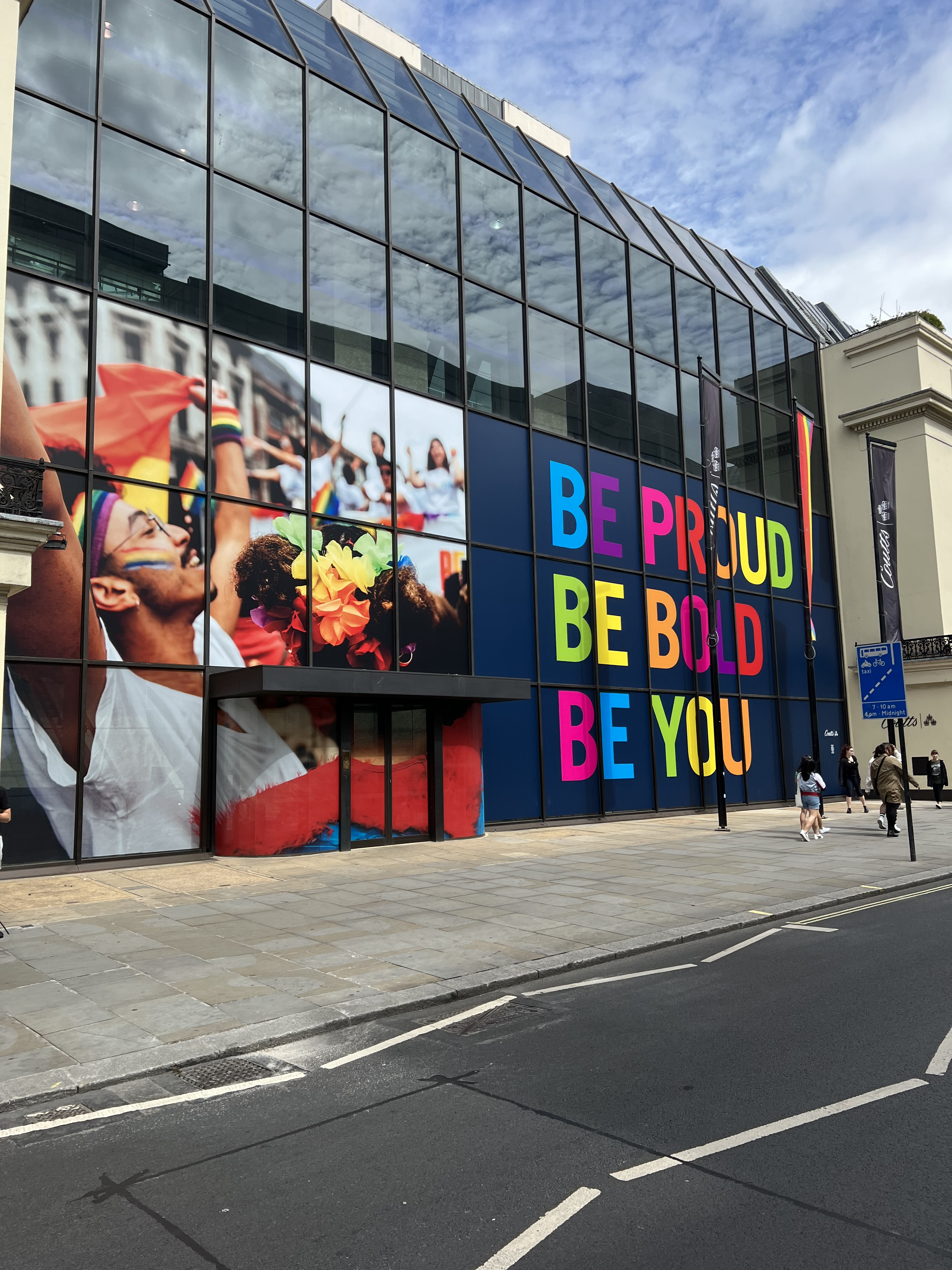
The London headquarters of Coutts, a bank, featuring a pride display, 2022

Rainbow capitalism (also called pink capitalism, queer capitalism, homocapitalism or gay capitalism) is the involvement of capitalism, corporate capitalism, and consumerism in participating in, appropriating, and profiting from the LGBTQ movement. It developed as the LGBTQ community became more accepted in society and developed sufficient purchasing power to be a viable market, known as pink money. Early rainbow capitalism, during the 20th century, was limited to gay bars and gay bathhouses, though it had expanded to most industries in many Western countries by the early-21st century.

Capitalism incentivizes corporations to promote LGBTQ rights to increase worker satisfaction, expand their consumer base, and maintain a positive public image. A corporation may also support LGBTQ rights because its executives personally believe in the cause. Marketing to the LGBT community has played a major role in promoting social acceptance of LGBTQ people, including increased LGBTQ representation in media and advertising, though it has also perpetuated stereotypes. The basic concepts of rainbow capitalism have also been adopted by some governments who may use LGBT rights to support their foreign policy.

Off the back of the landmark Obergefell v. Hodges in the United States, rainbow capitalism had been widely prominent in much of the Western world from approximately 2015 until 2023. Certain of its aspects have enjoyed broad public support, for example, 76% of LGBTQ Americans supported corporate presence in Pride parades as of 2019. However, rainbow capitalism has been criticized by both right-wing and left-wing activists for reasons including that it went overboard (promoting "wokeness" or forcing cultural change), that many corporations will express nominal support for the LGBTQ community while also supporting anti-LGBTQ politicians, that it commodified the LGBTQ movement and abandoned its Stonewall roots, and suspicions that companies are using it solely for profit purposes rather than morally supporting the cause (a phenomenon referred to as "pinkwashing").

== Historical context ==
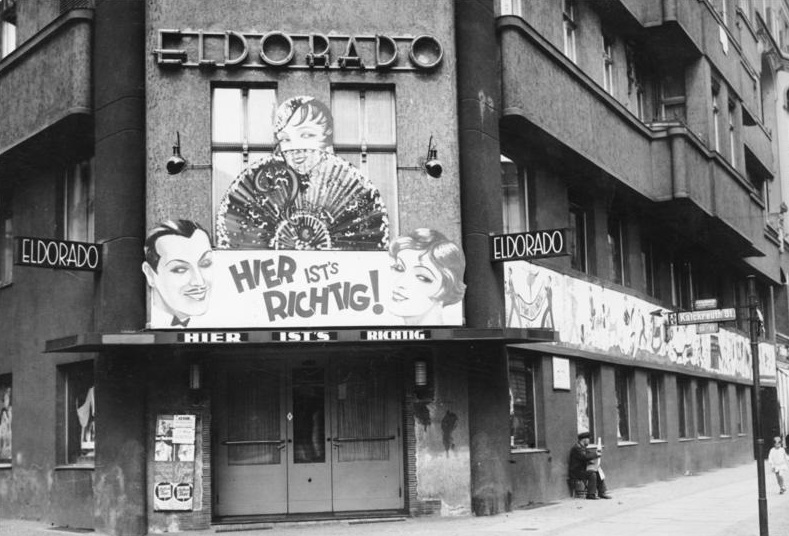
LGBT Club Eldorado in Berlin during the 1920s

According to some authors, the global evolution of "pink capitalism" has been parallel to the development of modern capitalism in the West. Although historical evidence shows that diversity of sexualities has always existed, different periods in businesses' development targeted at the LGBT community which have contributed to the construction of diverse sexual identities, can be distinguished. The creation of businesses that catered to the LGBT community corresponded to the beginning of the first drive for LGBT rights. This first LGBT movement was attacked between the First and Second World Wars, during the rise of fascism in Europe.

After the Second World War, Western culture was influenced by the homophobia of fascism. Although LGBT consumption remained marginal, during this time various homophile associations were created to seek positive assessment of homosexuality by society through meetings, publications, or charity parties. These associations opposed behaviors associated with homosexuals deemed marginal and perverted, such as promiscuity, cruising, prostitution, saunas and erotic magazines.

In the United States, marketing toward gay Americans began in "underground" gay communities in the late-19th century, occurring after urbanization allowed these communities to come together. Sellers were often unaware that a community they serviced was associated with the gay movement, though many bathhouses, brothels, and bars were sometimes operated for the gay community. The relocation of enlisted men during and after World War II allowed gay neighborhoods to form, LGBT periodicals emerged, and the 1958 Supreme Court decision One, Inc. v. Olesen legalized materials featuring discussion of homosexuality. The Stonewall riots shifted perceptions of the gay community in 1969, and the gay community was recognized as a legitimate economic market in the 1970s. Marketing to the gay community was complicated by the AIDS crisis in the 1980s, but it also further elevated awareness of the gay community.

The gay movement resulted in a negative social response, in part driven by the HIV/AIDS pandemic, which in turn led to the development of the LGBT movement by discriminated gay groups. During the 1990s, the discrimination of the LGBT community diminished, broadening LGBT people's access to formerly heteronormative jobs. This resulted in increased purchasing power for the LGBT community, or the creation of "pink money". Homosexuals in particular represented a large portion of this purchasing power. The trend is closely related to that of DINKs, couples with two incomes and no children.

== Prominence during the 2010s and 2020s ==
The "era" of rainbow capitalism is considered to have begun with Obergefell v. Hodges, the ruling that made same-sex marriage across the United States, in 2015. Combined with increased social acceptance of the LGBTQ+ community, major companies and corporations begun promoting and investing heavily in Pride campaigns and Pride-themed promotions and products. During this time, a significant number of companies also adopted the rainbow flag as a symbol and temporarily rebranded logos during Pride month, a phenomenon that became increasingly mass market mainstream by 2018.

According to the Human Rights Campaign foundation in 2018, 9 in 10 Fortune 500 companies had shown explicit support for LGBTQ+ rights, ranging from basic workplace protections to engagement and promotion of the LGBTQ+ movement. However, rainbow capitalism has not been a global phenomenon: in cases, brands have selectively opted not to rebrand under the LGBT colours for markets and audiences such as India, Japan, and the Middle East. Overt rainbow campaigns by corporations have been rare in Eastern Europe compared to the West in part due to local hostility.

This period of highly-visible rainbow capitalism had subsided in 2023, when major companies both in the United States and elsewhere began rolling back public support for Pride. Various reasons have been cited including a growing backlash, culminating in the Bud Light boycott and the Target backlash, with Target making substantial cuts to its Pride collection for 2024. A survey quoted by Forbes revealed that more than one in three thought that corporate promotion of Pride had gone "too far". The downtrend of rainbow capitalism only accelerated under the second Trump administration from 2025 which was openly against diversity, equity, and inclusion (DEI) frameworks. Aaron Hicklin wrote in The New York Times during that year's Pride Month that "the era of rainbow capitalism is well and truly over."

Rainbow corporate logos during Pride Month, which have been a symbolic element of rainbow capitalism, have since declined in frequency both in the United States and elsewhere as seen in, for example, the German Mercedes-Benz and Siemens.

=== Backlash critical analysis ===
The widespread prominence of rainbow capitalism at its peak eventually led to an increased backlash, with some individuals thinking that corporate support for LGBT Pride had gone too far. In 2019, Brendan O'Neill wrote in the British weekly The Spectator, noting the frequency of the Pride flag in London buildings, that it had become "dispiriting" that waving the national flag of England would lead to accusations of racism and "ill judgement" by "the new moral majority", but "wave the Pride flag and they’ll love you." O'Neill added that "Today it isn’t homosexuals who are persecuted; it’s their critics, whether it’s Ann Widdecombe or Tim Farron. [..] Gay people should be as free and equal as straight people. And today they are. That’s wonderful. But the fact you are gay is the least interesting thing about you. Tell me something else."

In 2023, Clay Travis said regarding the Target backlash that companies have to wake up and "move back towards the middle" as they have to sell to everyone: "I think it's tremendously significant because this is how we bring the country back to normalcy, as opposed to every business and every company going far left-wing." Target had suffered a sales volume decline of 28% in the aftermath of the backlash. Travis also felt that the backlash was championed by mothers just as the Bud Light boycott was a reaction by fathers and men. The backlashes marked an effective wider cultural shift.

Aaron Hicklin, editor of gay magazine Out, wrote in 2025 that the "fall" of rainbow capitalism mirrored its initial rise as a reactionary movement:

For the best part of two decades queer activists exploited social media to shame corporate America for its historic neglect of L.G.B.T.Q. rights. Mostly that was a good thing. But Twitter also drove outrage to excess. [..] Did we help ourselves by piling on a carrot juice company or when we freaked out in 2013 about Barilla pasta when its chairman said he wouldn’t feature gay families in ads? GLAAD’s response to the Barilla chairman’s statement: a solemn suggestion that consumers would switch to “more inclusive brands like Bertolli,” because, you know, pasta must be progressive, too. [..] It’s hard not to see those campaigns now as a template for how the MAGA movement responded to Anheuser-Busch and Dylan Mulvaney. The conservative backlash to queer visibility is uglier by far, but it’s following the same script, compounded by our growing inability to reason and rationalize. Truth is very often the first casualty.

Sara Pequeño wrote on USA Today that same year: "There is no world where a JPMorgan Chase & Co. sponsorship at New York City's annual Pride March was going to solve homophobia in the United States. [..] The brands that are backing away from Pride Month are doing exactly what we knew they would do all along – support LGBTQ+ people only as long as it was profitable."

== Mechanisms ==
=== Social acceptance ===
Capitalist accommodation of the LGBT community has caused a significant increase in social tolerance for the community, contributing to the expansion civil and political rights for LGBT people. Public image of the LGBT community has been affected by the increasing acceptance of gay men in advertising, entertainment, fashion trends. In these formats, the LGBT community is primarily represented by younger white gay men, and LGBT representation is often not representative of the community as a whole. Television shows such as Queer Eye portrayed a specific identity of the gay community. These perceptions may also be shared by members of the LGBT community:

In the pre-gay period, youth is worth of sexual exchange, but the elderly homosexuals were not stigmatized. With the extension of gay model and institutionalization that this entails, a sex market is formed where one of the most appreciated goods for sexual intercourse, as well as virility, is youth. The overvaluation of youth imposed by the gay style involves an underestimation of the mature adult male.

— Pink Society, p. 93

The quantity of LGBT-friendly advertising and LGBT representation in marketing increased in the early 2010s through the use of human interest advertisement, but this increase has focused on specific intersections of sexuality, class, age, and race, while most remain underrepresented. In the 1990s and 2000s, the term "metrosexual" was often used to market traditionally LGBT trends to heterosexual men. These concepts are considered to have significantly benefited the LGBT community through increased acceptance in society and breaking down of gender norms while also contributing to the perpetuation of LGBT stereotypes.

Social marketing is the intentional use of marketing to achieve social tolerance and social acceptance. Businesses often have the advantage of needing to appease only their target market rather than a majority of the public at large, as is the case in politics. LGBT individuals are also more likely to be early adopters of new products. This has caused businesses to be more likely to accept LGBT individuals and communities before the general public and legal protections. The majority of Fortune 500 companies established nondiscrimination policies by the 2010s and guaranteed equal benefits to same-sex couples.

=== Politics and the LGBT movement ===
==== Historical views ====
The first modern political movements advocating sexual freedoms and sexual rights date back to the Age of Enlightenment in Europe, during which many traditional ideas of medievalism and feudalism were challenged. According to Michel Foucault, this period saw a movement away from religious connotations of sex to views of "unnaturalness".

The role of sexuality was debated by writers and philosophers of the era. Plays during this time would transgress gender norms, though LGBT themes were often implicit, and Libertine and Gothic writers sometimes experimented with representation of homosexual activity. Liberal philosophers such as Montesquieu and Cesare Beccaria advocated the rights of due process for those accused of sodomy, and Marquis de Sade adapted the arguments of John Locke to support sexual expression as amoral. Conservative commentators viewed these developments as having a "corrupt impact" on women. The earliest organized LGBT movements formed in the late-19th and early-20th centuries from the communities centered around specific industries that catered to LGBT groups, such as gay bars.

==== Economic aspects ====
According to the 2000 census, lesbian, gay, and bisexual individuals and couples in the United States are equally as likely to be poor as heterosexual individual couples. 7% of same-sex female couples were in poverty, 4% of same-sex male couples were in poverty, and 5% of heterosexual couples were in poverty. After adjusting for various family characteristics, LGBT families are more likely to be poor than heterosexual families. Several studies conducted in the 1980s and 1990s found that the number of LGBT Americans that experienced employment discrimination ranged between 16% and 68%. Gay men were also found to earn 10% to 32% less than similarly qualified heterosexual men. Transgender people were found to have high unemployment, and those who were employed received low earnings.

In the 21st century, the gay rights movement has produced greater protections for LGBT people as workers and as consumers. In the United States, accommodation of the LGBT community through capitalist mechanisms has resulted in economic and societal protections for the LGBT community greater than those prescribed under the law. Under the American economic system, employers are incentivized to support the workforce to achieve greater efficiency. This cooperation has resulted in the creation of employee resource groups that allow for organization improvement of LGBT employment. Corporations that support workplace diversity are more likely to protect LGBT employees and executives beyond what is required by the law. Capitalism also incentivizes corporations to incorporate workplace equality policies to achieve greater customer satisfaction. Corporations with LGBT workplace equality policies are viewed more favorably by customers, employees, and partners. Corporations that implement these policies see benefits in marketing capability and overall improvement in performance.

==== Diplomatic aspects ====
The basic concepts of rainbow capitalism—using support for LGBTQ causes to increase employee satisfaction, improve public image, and advance unrelated agendas—have also been adopted by some governments. They may use LGBT rights to support their foreign policy, such as by exerting pressure on other countries to adopt LGBTQ protections. They may also justify punitive actions against enemies due to their poor track record on LGBTQ rights, or oppose immigration from these countries, claiming their residents will remain homophobic even after immigration and vote to repeal LGBTQ protections. As with corporations, governments may adopt these practices due to genuine belief, for cynical gain, or out of a combination of these factors.

The concept of "homocapitalism" is the application of gay rights issues and involvement of LGBT communities in international trade and foreign aid. In most African countries, same-sex marriage is seen as "ungodly, un-African, homonegative, unnatural and unacceptable", often invoking religious ideas of Christianity, Islam, or traditional African religions. Western nations, such as the United States and the United Kingdom, apply political and financial pressure for these countries to adopt legal protections for LGBT people. Countries that refuse to provide these protections are sometimes boycotted by governments and private donors. This is in contrast with predominantly Buddhist and Hindu countries, where homosexual activity is typically not prohibited on religious grounds.

Far-right politicians, such as British politician David Coburn, have also used LGBT issues and the persecution of LGBT minorities in other countries to advocate homonationalism. Homonationalism, a term coined by queer theorist Jasbir Puar, refers to the growing acceptance of LGBT rights by Western nations coupled with the complicity of LGBT individuals and organizations involved in nationalist politics. This ideology first arose within the context of the war on terror, as the United States positioned itself as LGBT-friendly in opposition to the seemingly homophobic Muslim world. It has also been used by the Israeli government to justify its position in the Israeli–Palestinian conflict by comparing its stronger protections of LGBT rights to those of Palestine.

Some LGBT people involved in American anti-war movements have criticized the broader LGBT community for its tolerance of military activity and military enlistment. When military whistleblower Chelsea Manning’s nomination to the board of San Francisco Pride was rescinded in 2013, local LGBT groups organized and distributed petitions, claiming that the rescindment was politically motivated. Anti-war activists have also criticized weapons manufacturers such as Axon Enterprise and Raytheon Technologies for participating in Pride Month. Critics argue that support or opposition for various military actions, or for the military in general, is largely unrelated to support for LGBT rights; it is possible, and indeed common, to support or oppose both at the same time. For example, in the United States, trans people served in the military at twice the rate of cis people prior to Donald Trump's ban on transgender servicemembers.

=== Corporate involvement in LGBT Pride ===
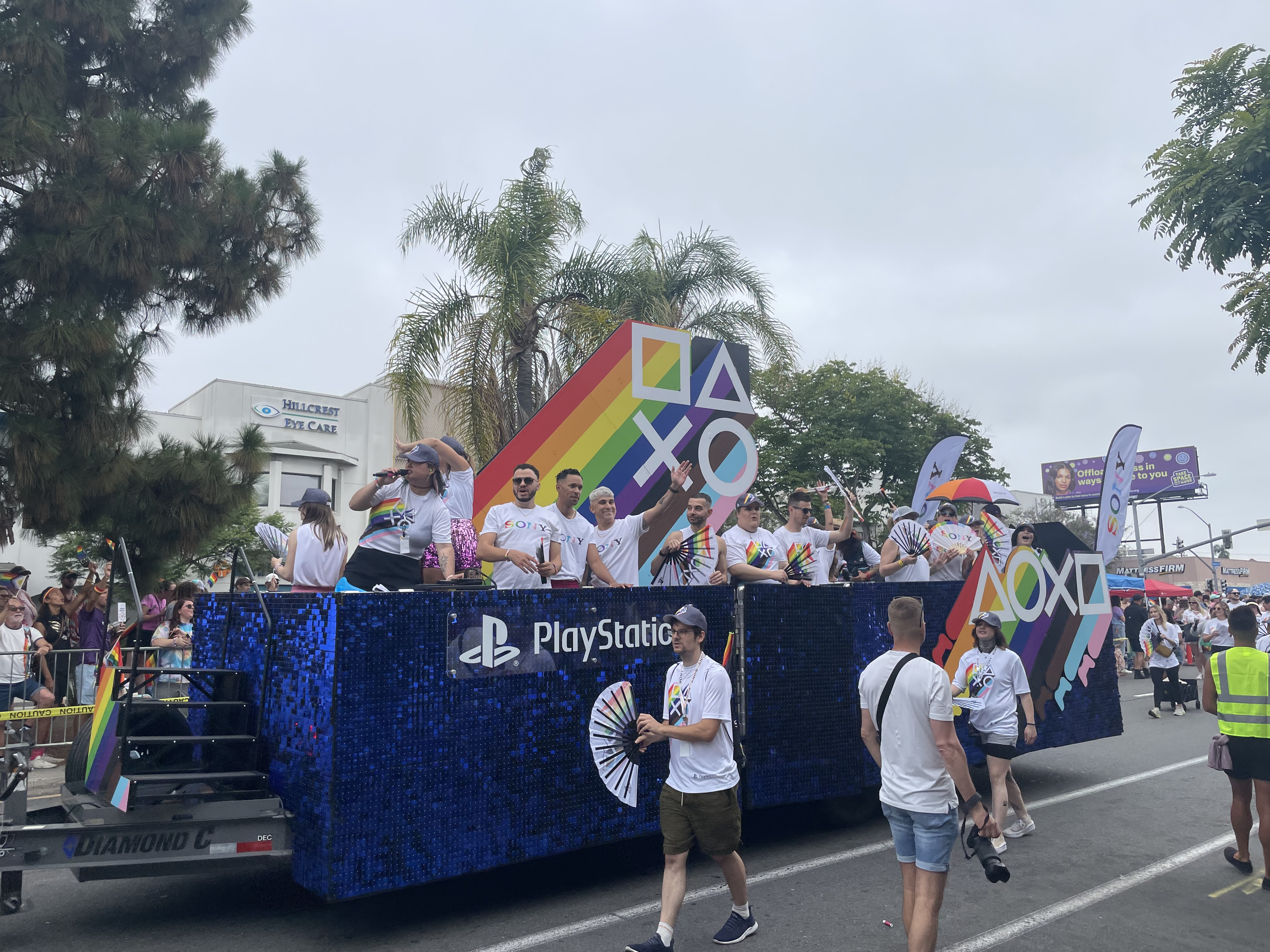
PlayStation Float at San Diego Pride 2025

Major corporations have become more active in LGBT Pride events in the early-21st century. Many corporations celebrate Pride Month by incorporating it into marketing and publicly expressing support for the LGBT community. In the United States, some of these corporations have been criticized for making campaign donations to legislators that oppose LGBT rights. Other corporations are praised for providing material support to the LGBT community during Pride Month. Kellogg's has been praised for celebrating Pride Month by donating to GLAAD and featuring content about preferred gender pronouns. Many corporations release pride themed products during Pride Month, and contribute to LGBT nonprofit groups using the proceeds. Adidas, Apple, Disney, Nike, Peloton, and other major brands donated to The Trevor Project and other LGBT nonprofit organizations in 2020.

Many factors may affect whether a corporation takes a stance on LGBT issues. Protection of LGBT workers results in higher job satisfaction and increased performance. Support for LGBT rights is also associated with seeking a positive public image, particularly for corporations that have high brand-awareness. LGBT people within the company may also influence the behavior of a corporation. The presence of openly LGBT employees in a workforce correlates with corporate support for LGBT rights, and employee resource groups for LGBT workers are sometimes supported by corporations, giving these groups involvement in decisions regarding LGBT issues. Such involvement was a factor in the partial repeal of the Religious Freedom Restoration Act in Indiana and the bathroom bill in North Carolina. Many CEOs and corporate executives also personally support LGBT rights and seek to direct their companies in line with their personal beliefs.

=== Neighborhoods ===
These processes are especially evident in the dynamics of gay neighborhoods, which attracted LGBT people with their affordability and the social security provided by living with other sexual minorities. These neighborhoods, after decreasing social stigma made them "trendy", then gradually underwent the gentrification process. Rising prices expelled the LGBT population that could not afford the new expenses. An increasingly specialized market developed around the LGBT community in parallel with these other events. This market specifically developed around the needs of the LGBT community, selling services and products exclusively designed to meet their needs. Different companies and firms in turn began incorporating the defense of LGBT rights into their company policies and codes of conduct, and even financing LGBT events.

This kind of sociosexual relations appraisement is characteristic of gay modelling, which has its origin in the companies' new formation of a concentrated sexual market through rainbow capitalism:

In Spain, neither virile redefinition of homosexuality, nor gay model spreading, were made from the active homosexual movement of the time. [...] The penetration of the new model is carried out through private channels: by entrepreneurs who mimetically reproduce gay institutions already present in other countries".

— Pink Society, p. 82–84

== Response ==
=== Support ===
Advocates of greater corporate involvement in LGBT Pride say that corporate support for the LGBT community can influence legislation, increase access for LGBT people, and reinforce broad support for acceptance of LGBT people in society. In 2020, The Trevor Project found that a majority of underage LGBT Americans felt more positively about their sexual identity because of brands that support the LGBT community. 76% of LGBT Americans supported corporate participation in Pride Month events, in contrast with organizers of many Pride events.

=== Political opposition ===
In the United States, Republican politicians have criticized corporations for taking stances in favor of LGBT rights. Florida Governor Ron DeSantis and other Republicans criticized Disney for being "woke" after it challenged the Florida Parental Rights in Education Act in 2022.

The then ruling party of Hungary initiated a boycott of Coca-Cola after its advertisements featuring a gay couple in 2019. Due to a growing backlash against the apparent "promotion" of LGBT, the Hungarian parliament passed several anti-LGBT laws in the years following. Also in 2019, the Swedish retailer Ikea faced legal action by the Polish state after the company posted a pro-LGBT message to its employees on its Polish corporate intranet page.

Czech president Milos Zeman said in 2021 described corporate-sponsored Pride marches as "minorities trying to put themselves on a superior footing to others". Politicians, as well as individuals, have cited such marches, funded by Western corporations, as being an external "Western" import forcing local cultural changes. In Slovakia in 2024, corporate-sponsored Pride events were among the LGBT projects that would no longer receive funding by the Culture Ministry. Similar cutting of funding had occurred for a Pride event in the Italian Lazio in 2023.

=== Push-back from LGBT groups and organizers ===
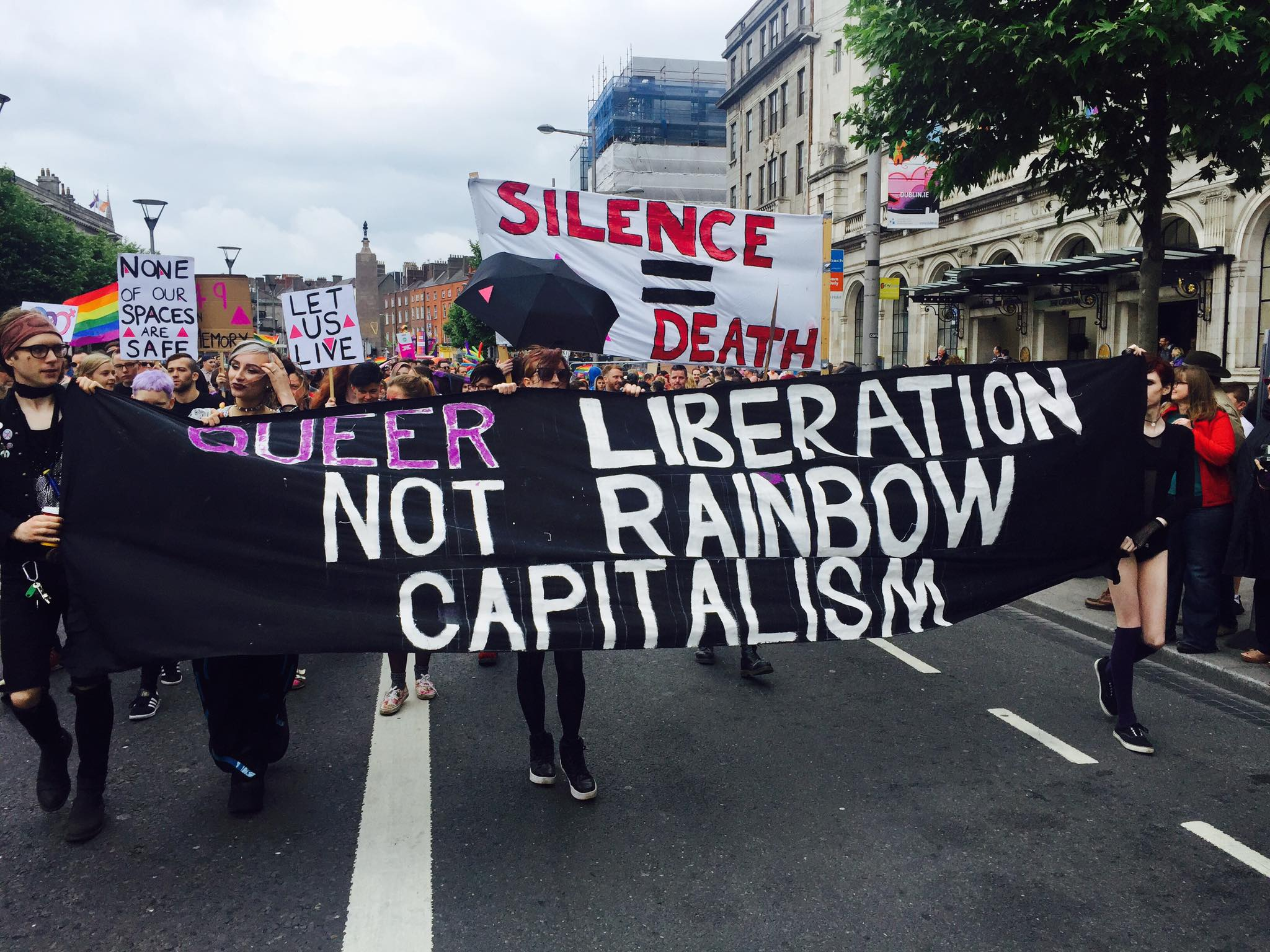
A "Queer liberation, not rainbow capitalism" banner at a Queer bloc protest against rainbow capitalism during Dublin Pride 2016

Many leftist LGBT groups protest corporate involvement and support of LGBT Pride. When Pride Glasgow started charging an attendance fee in 2015, a group of activists organised Free Pride Glasgow to be held on the same day, and on the day of Pride Glasgow every year since, as a free alternative that features protest rather than celebration. During the 2020 George Floyd protests in the United States, some groups like The Okra Project criticized LGBT Pride celebrations as overlooking the issues faced by the African-American LGBT community. The Black Lives Matter movement was noted in 2020 not to have had much corporate support as opposed to the widespread support for LGBT Pride.

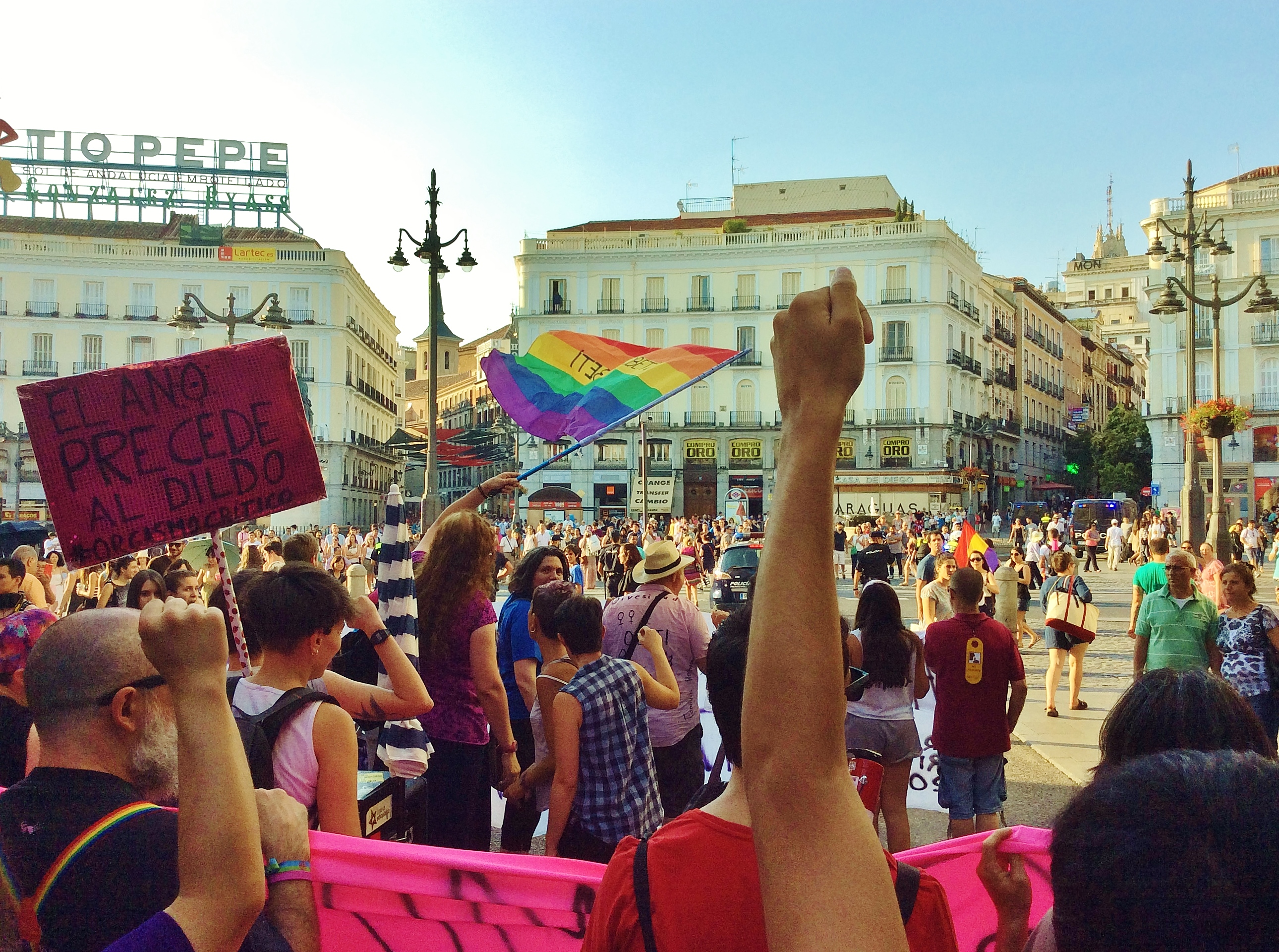
Critical Pride 2015 (Orgullo Crítico 2015) arriving at Puerta del Sol in Madrid, Spain

Following the passage of gay marriage in Spain, members of the LGBT community felt the Pride Parade was no longer protest demonstration and instead becoming a tourist business. Since 2006, several demonstrations against LGBT commodification have been held annually in suburbs of Madrid, called Alternative Pride or Critical Pride (Orgullo Alternativo or Orgullo Crítico). The first Indignant Pride (Orgullo Indignado) parade was held, calling for a different sexuality regardless of economic performance which should take into account gender, ethnicity, age and social class intersectionalities besides other non-normative corporalities. Later, the event retrieved the name Critical Pride (Orgullo Crítico), based on in part on objections to pink capitalism.

=== Accusations of pinkwashing ===
Rainbow capitalism has been criticised by both LGBT and non-LGBT viewpoints as a form of pinkwashing and tokenism wherein corporations as a marketing strategy try to cynically improve their reputation in order to distract from things like poor labour practices or their donations to anti-LGBT politicians. LGBTQ Nation states that "many brands that engage in pinkwashing are guilty of using the LGBTQ community to boost their PR and incur capital from 'pink money', all while maintaining unjust labor practices, discriminatory hiring processes, and supporting anti-LGBTQ organizations". Forbes reported in 2024 that Target Corporation, following backlash, was trying to find "a middle ground that continues to support the LGBT community without alienating others."

In addition, the pinkwashing has been viewed as corporations only doing these acts for profit and therefore erasing the historical rights-focused origins of Pride.

=== Criticism from anti-capitalists ===
Rainbow capitalism has also been opposed by pro-LGBT, anti-capitalist individuals, with comparisons having been made to it being a march of banks, corporations, and cops, rather than its original purpose for the queer community. Other socialist activists have also mirrored these views by claiming that the phenomenon divides "working-class people and distracting attention from those responsible for the hardship millions are experiencing: the super-rich capitalist class."

Left-wing activists have also pointed out that LGBTQ people are often poorer than heterosexual people when adjusting for other factors and often have more difficulty finding and securing work, though increased protections for LGBTQ individuals work to counteract this in some countries. LGBTQ people are also disproportionately likely to be victims of gentrification.

=== Comparison to women's rights movements ===
It has been analysed that rainbow capitalism from corporations have masked existing women's rights. The British-Hong Kong bank HSBC for example has been a major contributor to pro-LGBT marketing while maintaining a gender pay gap as wide as 47% to its female employees.

== See also ==
- Anti-capitalism
- Cishomonormativity
- Communism and LGBTQ rights
- Cultural assimilation
- Eco-capitalism
- Go woke go broke
- Hegemonic masculinity
- Heteronormativity
- Late capitalism
- LGBTQ marketing
- LGBTQ stereotypes
- Media culture
- Pink money
- Pinkwashing
- Political economy
- Purple capitalism
- Queer anarchism
- Social justice
- Woke capitalism
