= Henry Lewis Suggs =

American historian (1942–2026)

Henry Lewis Suggs (August 9, 1942 – September 4, 2026) was an American historian, academic, author and editor who was an emeritus professor of history. He wrote about African American newspapers and journalists. His books include a biography of P. B. Young, and a biography of James Edward Shepard who helped found North Carolina Central University. He also wrote articles.

== Early life and career ==
Henry Lewis Suggs was born in Winterville, North Carolina on August 9, 1942. He graduated with a B.A. and M.A. from North Carolina Central University. He received a PhD from University of Virginia.

He was the first African American faculty member at Western Carolina University and the second to become a full professor at Clemson University.

Suggs corresponded with Lenwood G. Davis and John Hope Franklin. Clemson has a collection of his papers.

== Personal life and death ==
On June 16, 1973, Suggs married Sharon Faye White of Charlottesville, Virginia, who was herself a professor of elementary education at the Hampton Institute.

Suggs died on September 4, 2026, at the age of 84.

== Writings ==
=== Books ===
- The Black Press in the South 1865-1879, editor Greenwood Press (1983)
- P.B. Young, Newspaperman: Race, Politics and Journalism in the New South, 1910–1962 (1988)
- The Black Press in the Middle West, 1865-1985
- Cecil Newman and the Minneapolis Spokesman: Journalism, History, and Culture in Minnesota 1865-1985
- James Edward Shepard: A History of North Carolina Central University (NCCU): 1875-1947;
- The Noble Warrior: Chester Arthur Franklin and the Kansas City Call, 1919-1955
- The Right Man Clemson University Press (2025)

=== Articles ===
- "The Response of the African American Press to the United States Occupation of Haiti, 1915-1934"
