= Gordon B. Hancock =

Gordon Blaine Hancock
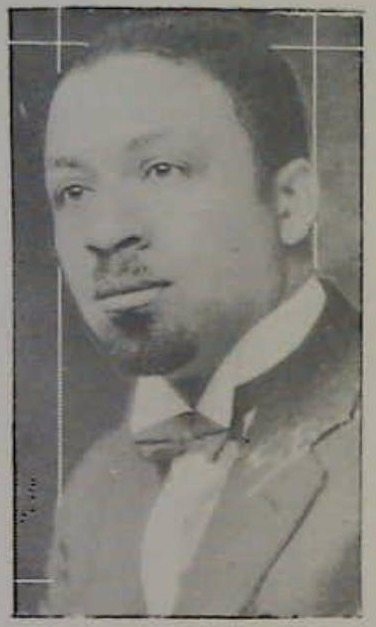
- Hancock in 1931
- Born: June 23, 1884; Ninety Six, South Carolina
- Died: June 24, 1970 (aged 86)
- Known for: Southern Conference on Race Relations, Double-duty dollar

Gordon Blaine Hancock (June 23, 1884 – July 24, 1970) was a professor at Virginia Union University and a leading spokesman for African American equality in the generation before the civil rights movement.

Hancock was a nationally syndicated columnist for the Norfolk Journal and Guide whose columns were published in 114 black newspapers. He was one of the organizers of the 1942 Southern Conference on Race Relations and gave the opening keynote address. This conference led to the publication of "A Basis for Inter-Racial Cooperation and Development in the South: A Statement by Southern Negroes," known as the Durham Manifesto, which asserted that the group was "fundamentally opposed to the principle and practice of segregation," including staunch opposition to Jim Crow.

Hancock joined the faculty at Virginia Union University in 1921. He became the chairman of the department of Economics and Sociology as well as the Director of the Francis J. Torrance School of Race Relations at Virginia Union University. He linked education to activism, requiring students to perform community service, and encouraged black people to patronize black-owned businesses, calling this the "Double Duty Dollar."

== Early and personal life ==
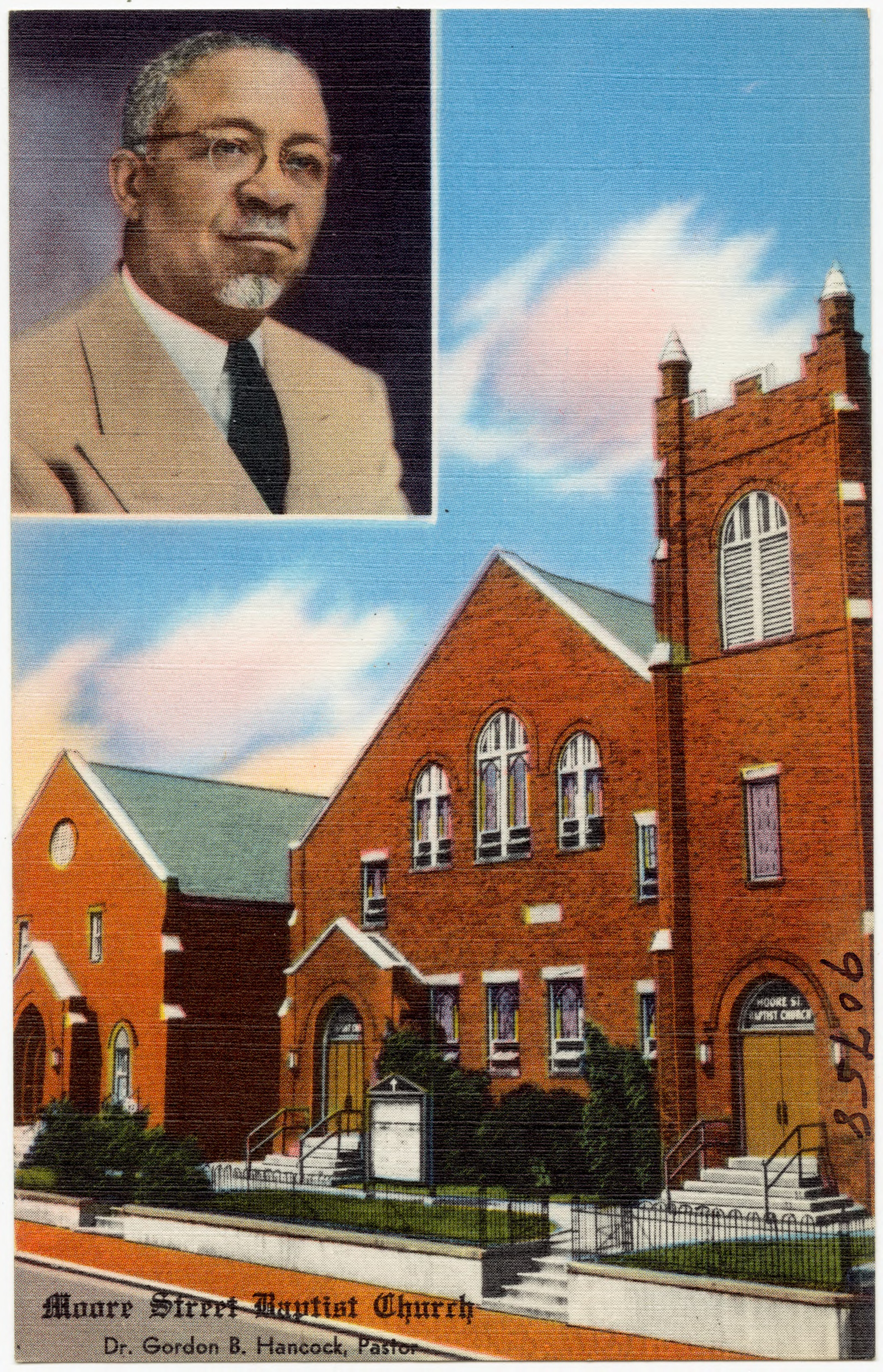
Gordon Hancock and his church.

Hancock was born in Ninety Six, South Carolina to Robert and Anna Hancock who had been formerly enslaved. He earned degrees from Benedict College and Colgate University, and received a master's degree in sociology from Harvard University. He was married to Florence Marie Dickson. He was the pastor of Moore Street Baptist church in Richmond from 1925 until he retired in 1963.

== Inspiration ==
As introduced in Dr. W.E.B. Du Bois’ book, In Battle for Peace: The Story of My 83rd Birthday, Hancock wrote in the Associated Negro press in December 1951. “There is a shout in the heart of Negroes everywhere, for Du Bois has long been our symbol of manhood and integrity. He has shown in a thousand ways that he is the ablest champion of the Negroes’ yet unrealized full citizenship. It was a shame that Dr. Du Bois, the Negro champion, almost had to bear his cross alone. Negroes who might have helped and held up his hands followed afar off. This writer was humbled to see in a list of Negroes petitioning President Truman for executive help so few influential Negroes. In other words, the important Negroes of this country, the headliners, the highly positioned, the degreed Negroes stayed off the petition by droves. Negroes who claim to be race champions and crusaders and fighters and leaders and uncompromisers to the last ditch actually deserted Dr. Du Bois in the hour of his greatest trial".

== Community engagement ==
Hancock became a member of Gamma chapter of Omega Psi Phi while attending Harvard and working towards his master's degree in sociology.

The Urban League of Greater Richmond was co-founded by Dr. Gordon B. Hancock, and became affiliated with the National Urban League on December 1, 1923; which covers the areas of the Chester, Chesterfield, Henrico, Petersburg, and the City of Richmond, VA. This chapter of the Urban League's mission is:

"To assist under-served citizens in the achievement of social and economic equality through advocacy, collaboration direct services and research."

The Urban League of Greater Richmond also provides programs and services to help members seek and acquire jobs, healthcare, and support educational endeavors.

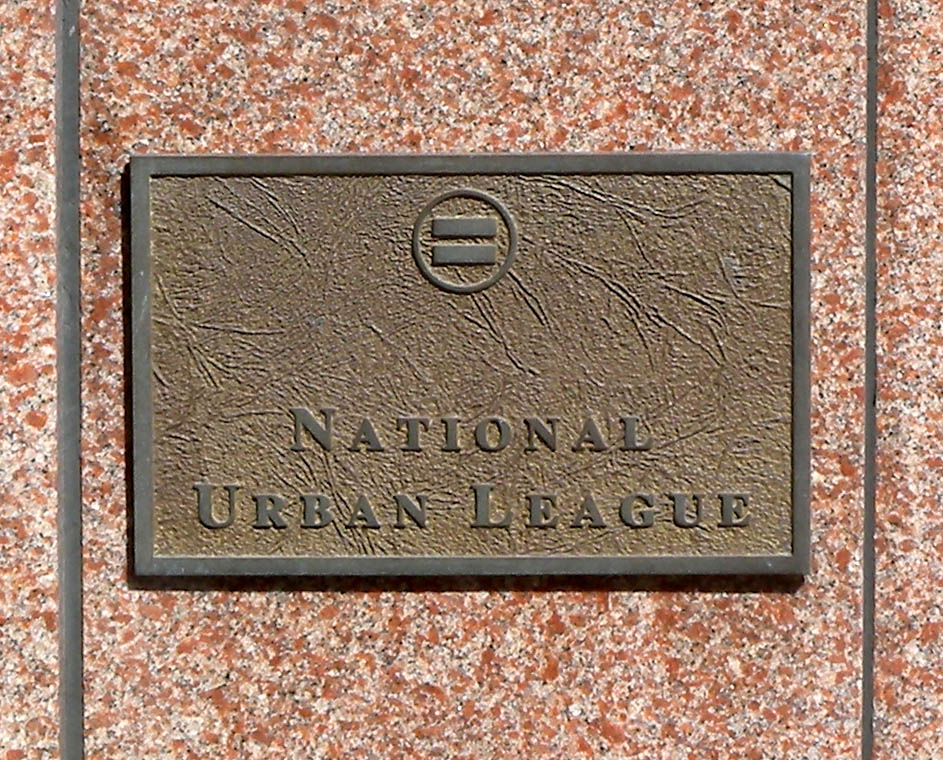
National Urban League Plaque

In October of the year 1925, Gordon B. Hancock became the pastor of Moore Street Baptist Church. After nearly forty years of serving the community as a Pastor, Hancock retires in 1963.

== Virginia Union, articles, papers and essays ==
Clergyman, journalist, educator, and civil rights spokesman, which also includes five series: Correspondence; Southern Regional Council; Clippings/Writings; Miscellany; and Photographs. These papers are the writings by Gordon Blaine Hancock, over the span of 1928-1970. The collection relates primarily to Hancock's efforts to increase opportunities for Blacks. Among those efforts was a course he organized on race relations at Virginia Union University in 1922, which is believed to have been the first course of its kind in America. As chair of Virginia Union's Department of History and Sociology, he linked education to activism, requiring students, for example, to perform community service. The “races vie in a fierce struggle for existence,” he taught, and African Americans must face the reality of segregation by building their institutions and resources and winning allies among whites. “Segregation means death to form of elimination that must be terminated if the Negro is to survive.” In the 1930s and 1940s, Hancock became an outspoken leader in the struggle for racial equality, speaking at over 40 black and white colleges and universities. In 1942, with P. B. Young, editor of the Norfolk Journal and Guide and black historian Luther P. Jackson of Virginia State College, he helped organize the Southern Conference on Race Relations. The conference brought together black leaders from across the South. As a result of the conference, the group issued the "Durham Manifesto" in which they set forth the "articles of cooperation." The articles stated what blacks wanted and expected from the post war South and from the nation in the areas of political and civil rights, employment, education, agriculture, military service, and social welfare and health.

== Social and political solutions ==
Hancock proposed a spending plan called "Double Duty Dollar", that encouraged black people to hold fast to their jobs, land and money while spending money within the African-American community. He believed that unemployment was the number one problem for African-American people. He also welcomed white philanthropists and teachers who supported African-Americans in their struggle for a quality education.

Hancock came to Virginia Union as a professor to organize and lead a sociology and economics department. Hancock taught students that the black race was not inferior to white nor prone to criminal activity. Hancock believed that with better income opportunities, black people could break the bonds of cyclical poverty. His course in race relation at Virginia Union was believed to be the first in the country.

== Death ==
Hancock's article he wrote titled, "Interracial Hypertension", stimulated a reform of the CIC during World War II. It also stimulated the release of the "Durham Manifesto". It was an effect of the 1942 conference Hancock planned. "It asserted that the group was "fundamentally" opposed to the principle and practice of segregation". Hancock wrote a speech that stated his position to take a stand against segregation. They then started the Southern Regional Council in 1944. The purpose was to "attain through research and action programs the ideals and practices of equal opportunity." They stated their side in opposing segregation in 1951 because of the board members and Hancock pushing them to do so. Hancock became a professor at Virginia Union in 1952. He still continued to conduct his pastoral duties, until his retirement in 1963. IN 1963 he received his honorary doctorate from Virginia Union University. He died at his home on July 24, 1970.

== Legacy ==
Hancock, the pastor, the educator, lived a life trying to educate the black race and help with self identity. He had the first course of race relations at Virginia Union, and some of his teachings to his students were of that they were not inferior to whites, or prone to criminal activity. He inspired his people, and his workings were described by his students as “progressing race relations forward.” Hancock proposed spending plans such as “Double Duty Dollar, attempting to break the barriers of cyclical poverty, and held campaigns helping inspire negros to fight their biggest problem to him, which was unemployment. In his church he helped erase $35,000 in debt, and increase their center so more of the youth and other members of the community could have a place to go, and be inspired. Hancock lived his life fighting segregation and social injustice upon the black race, and trying to educate blacks in their economical standing, and how to rise above and become educated and powerful through his lessons, sermons, and writings.
