= St John's Marlborough =

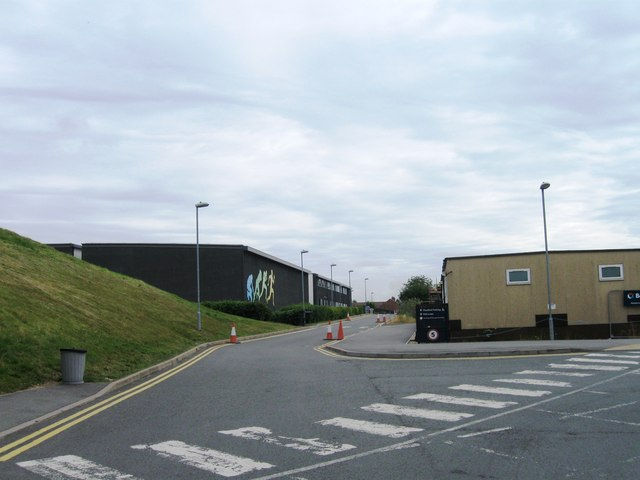

Location
- Granham Hill; Marlborough, Wiltshire, SN8 4AX; England; 51°24′55″N 1°43′42″W

Information
- Type: Academy
- Established: 1975
- Department for Education URN: 138623 Tables
- Ofsted: Reports
- Headteacher: Alan Henderson
- Gender: Mixed
- Age: 11 to 18
- Enrolment: 1,728 (November 2023)
- Website: www.stjohns.excalibur.org.uk

St John's Marlborough (formerly St John's School and Community College) is a mixed secondary school with academy status in Marlborough, Wiltshire, England, for students aged 11 to 18. The school opened in 1975 and is in the south of the town. As of November 2023 it has 1,728 pupils.

== History ==
The school was formed in 1975 as a new comprehensive school, taking over the buildings and many of the staff of the recently closed Marlborough Royal Free Grammar School and the Marlborough Secondary Modern School on Chopping Knife Lane. The grammar school had been founded in 1550. The school's Savernake building was the former secondary modern school.

In 1998 the school was awarded its first specialism in Technology and in 2005 its second in Languages. After the rebuilding of the school on a new site at Granham Hill, the buildings of two former schools were demolished in 2010.

The school converted to academy status in September 2012. It is run by the Excalibur Academies Trust, a multi-academy trust which includes locally several primary schools and John O'Gaunt School, Hungerford.

== Buildings ==
Having taken over the buildings of the former grammar and secondary modern schools, in its early years the school operated on two separate sites. Building work for a new school started in June 2008, at an estimated cost of £26.5 million. Footballer Stuart Pearce officiated a turf cutting ceremony at the site in May 2008. The new building was brought into use in late 2009 and was officially opened by Camilla, Duchess of Cornwall, in 2010.

The new building was designed by Re-Format, formerly Format Milton Architects. The single-site project had been many years in the planning due to delays obtaining planning permission for the development of the other site, and complaints from local residents.

== Notable alumni ==
- Aaron Hicklin – editor of Out magazine
- Lauren Child – children's author and illustrator
- Rhys Thornbury – skeleton athlete
- Phil Hammond – physician, journalist, broadcaster, comedian and commentator
