= John Q. Jordan =

American journalist

John Quincy Jordan (died March 5, 1978) was an African-American journalist who covered all-black marine units in Italy during World War II. While there, he filed dispatches as a correspondent for the black-oriented Norfolk Journal and Guide. He also aided the evacuation of injured units and prepared black soldiers for interviews with white journalists.

== Legacy ==
Norfolk State University now awards the John Q. Jordan scholarship to undergraduate journalism students.
