= New Journal and Guide =

Newspaper based in Virginia, United States

- Type: Weekly newspaper
- Format: Broadsheet
- Owner: Brenda H. Andrews
- Publisher: Brenda H. Andrews
- Founded: 1900
- Language: English
- Headquarters: Norfolk, Virginia, USA
- ISSN: 2641-1350
- OCLC number: 26628042
- Website: www.thenewjournalandguide.com

The New Journal and Guide is a regional weekly newspaper based in Norfolk, Virginia, and serving the Hampton Roads area. The weekly focuses on local and national African-American news, sports, and issues and has been in circulation since 1900.

== History ==
Begun in Norfolk in 1900 by the Supreme Lodge Knights of Gideon, a Black fraternal order, it was originally called the Gideon Safe Guide and served as a newsletter for the order. The name later was changed to the Lodge Norfolk and Guide. By 1910, it was a weekly newspaper with four pages, and had 500 subscribers. The paper's publishing plant was held under a mortgage at the time, but when the bank holding the mortgage collapsed in 1910, the newspaper had to fold. P. B. Young Sr., an associate editor at the paper, borrowed $3,000 to buy it and renamed it to the Norfolk Journal and Guide.

The Norfolk Journal and Guide was considered to be a moderate or conservative newspaper, primarily because it had to be more cautious in its speech against racial injustices compared to black newspapers published in the North. It often did not call for activism as clearly as other black newspapers did. This difference made it easier for the Journal and Guide to obtain advertisements from white-owned businesses, including large ones like Ford, Goodrich, and Pillsbury. However, the Journal and Guide has been noted as much more radical than most of the southern black press during the mid-20th century, occupying a middle position with papers like the Miami Tropical Dispatch and Tri-State Defender. Since these papers were not located in the Deep South, they had more freedom to speak. The paper's moderate leanings did not stop the Journal and Guide from staging many crusades for various causes throughout its history, but some of its campaigns directly opposed the positions taken by other black papers.

During the 1910s and 1920s, the Journal and Guide critiqued the Great Migration of black families leaving the South. Young wrote that the movement was unnecessary because there were enough labor opportunities in the South for black workers, and the migration would decrease the size of the black workforce in the South. Denouncement of lynching and black voter mobilization efforts were other key topics for the Journal and Guide in the 1920s. The paper covered the trial of the Scottsboro Boys and led fundraising for their defense. During the 1930s, the paper also wrote against the unfairly high rate of poverty and unemployment for African-Americans.

The Journal and Guide steadily expanded in reach during this time. By 1919, the paper was distributed across the entire East Coast of the U.S., and over the next ten years it expanded into nearby cities like Chicago, Kansas City, and Omaha. By 1928, it had the most subscribers of any of the Southern black newspapers, and in 1935, the Journal and Guide had around 29,000 subscribers.

By the time World War II began, the Journal and Guide was the largest Black employer in the South, and the only black paper in the South to carry a national edition. Circulation rose, by various reports, to 80,000 or 100,000 subscriptions. The paper pushed for the integration of the military and its industries during the war. Wartime correspondents for the Journal and Guide reported on black soldiers who rarely received commensurate representation in the non-black press. The paper sent photographers and writers to report on units during battle, including one of the only two U.S. Navy ships with a black crew, the USS Mason.

It won four consecutive Wendell Willkie awards for outstanding journalism. Along with the Chicago Defender, the Baltimore Afro-American and the Pittsburgh Courier, the Journal and Guide took the lead in informing the Black community on events as they related to such issues as housing and job discrimination among Black soldiers. At that time, the Guide ranked fourth in circulation among Black newspapers in the United States.

In 1946, Young's sons took over the paper, running it until the 1960s. For several decades, it then passed through various private owners. Brenda Andrews bought the paper in 1991 and continued publishing it until at least 2015. She had worked at the paper since 1982, when she joined as assistant to the paper's publisher.

From 1910 to 1991, it was called both the Norfolk Journal and Guide and the Journal and Guide. Since 1991, it has been called the New Journal and Guide.

== Notable contributors ==
- P. B. Young, Sr. (the founding publisher who served more than 50 years and for whom a Norfolk public housing community is named),
- Thomas Young
- P. B. Young, Jr.,
- Bernard Young
- Southall Bass
- John Q. Jordan
- John Hinton
- Dr. Gordon B. Hancock
- Dr. Milton A. Reid
- James N. Rhea
- Dr. Carlton B. Goodlett.
