= Double-duty dollar =

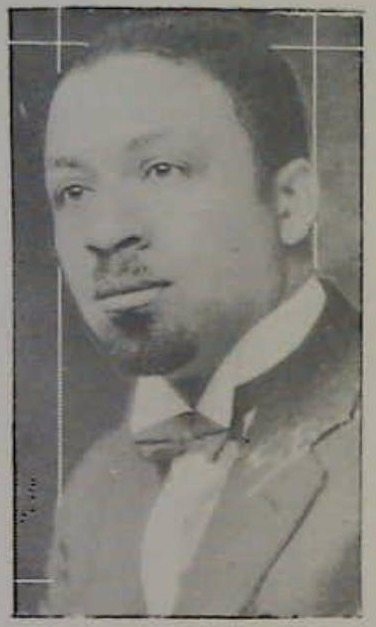
Gordon B. Hancock, the Virginia Union University professor who popularized the term.

The term double duty dollar was used in the United States from the early 1900s until the early 1960s to express the notion that dollars spent with businesses that hired African Americans "simultaneously purchased a commodity and advanced the race". The term was used by people who believed that retailers who excluded African Americans as employees should be shunned by the Black community.

The slogan was popularized by Virginia Union University professor Gordon B. Hancock. Ministers and activists such as Booker T. Washington and Marcus Garvey urged the Black community to redirect their dollars from retailers and services who refused to hire African Americans to those who did hire them. In the 1940s and 1950s, Leon Sullivan applied the broader phrase "selective patronage" to denote consumers' choice of retailers as a tool to both influence businesses toward having more fair and non-discriminatory interactions with African Americans, and to build demand for African-American businesses.

While African-American initiatives inspired by this concept continue to exist, the strategy has also been applied by others for different, but similar reasons. Among their goals are

- to create economic incentives for gay-friendly suppliers;
- to decrease food miles;
- to reduce the environmental impact of agriculture and make it more sustainable;
- to make local economies deeper, etc. The double duty dollar concept is part of a broad spectrum of consumer activism or ethical consumerism strategies.

== See also ==
- African-American businesses
- Pink money
- Dollar voting
- Ethical consumerism
