= Diversity marketing =

Marketing paradigm

Diversity marketing, also known as inclusive marketing, inclusion marketing, or in-culture marketing, is a marketing paradigm which sees marketing (and especially marketing communications) as a way to connect with the different individuals in the market.

"Diversity marketing involves acknowledging that marketing and advertising must offer alternative ways of communicating to these diverse groups. With that knowledge, diversity marketers aim to develop a mix of different communication methods, to reach people in each of the diverse groups present in the market." Thus, diversity marketing is the process in which companies study the market they are in or about to enter by different means (e.g. surveys, focus groups or in some cases telecommunication). Diversity marketing is helping business owners and operators at all levels to connect with society through communication channels that best reach them, this creates exposure for the company which creates brand awareness. Diversity marketing realizes the markets vast differences and the market/consumers have different tastes may it be values, beliefs, interaction type and lifestyle choices. Such vast differences are then tackled by customized marketing strategies

"From a Marketing management perspective, culturally diverse environments, creates new challenges in recognizing, cultivating and reconciling different culture groups' perspectives within the same market."

== See also ==
- Rainbow capitalism
