= Pink money =

Term referring to the purchasing power of LGBT people

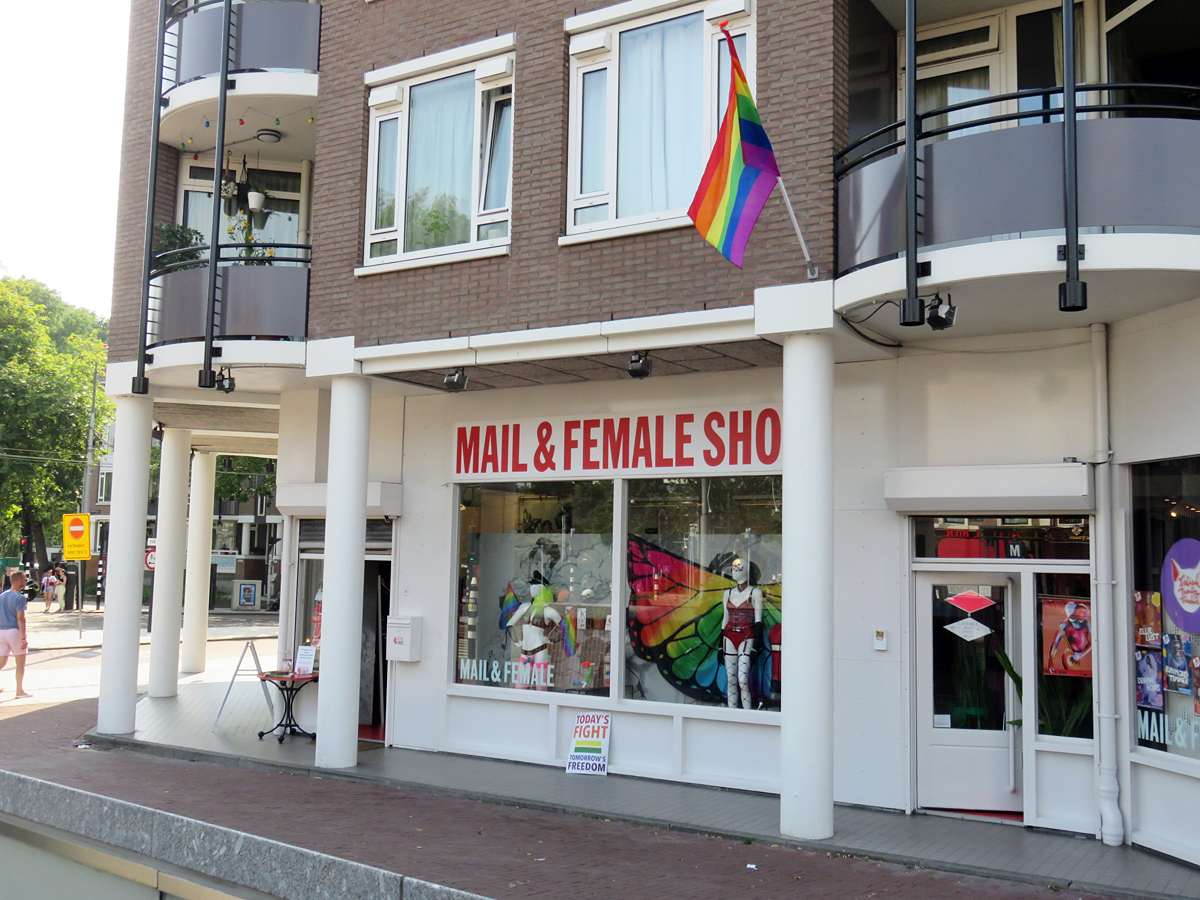
An LGBT-friendly shop in Amsterdam, Netherlands

Pink money describes the purchasing power of the LGBT community, often especially with respect to political donations. With the rise of the LGBT rights movement, pink money has gone from being a fringe or marginalized market to a thriving industry in many parts of the Western world. Many businesses now specifically cater to gay customers, including nightclubs, shops, restaurants, and even taxicabs; the demand for these services stems from common discrimination by traditional businesses. In 2019, LGBT adults globally held a combined buying power of approximately $3.7 trillion.

The economic power of pink money has been seen as a positive force for the gay community, creating a kind of "financial self-identification" which helps gay and lesbian individuals feel like part of a community which values them. Indeed, upwards of 90% of gay people support businesses which target pink money, while actively boycotting anti-gay companies. However, criticism has been leveled at businesses which target pink money from gay groups, arguing that this segregates the gay and lesbian community from society, and holds back gay rights. In recent years, the pursuit of pink money has come under scrutiny in some circles, questioning the sincerity of their support for LGBT causes.

== In the United Kingdom ==
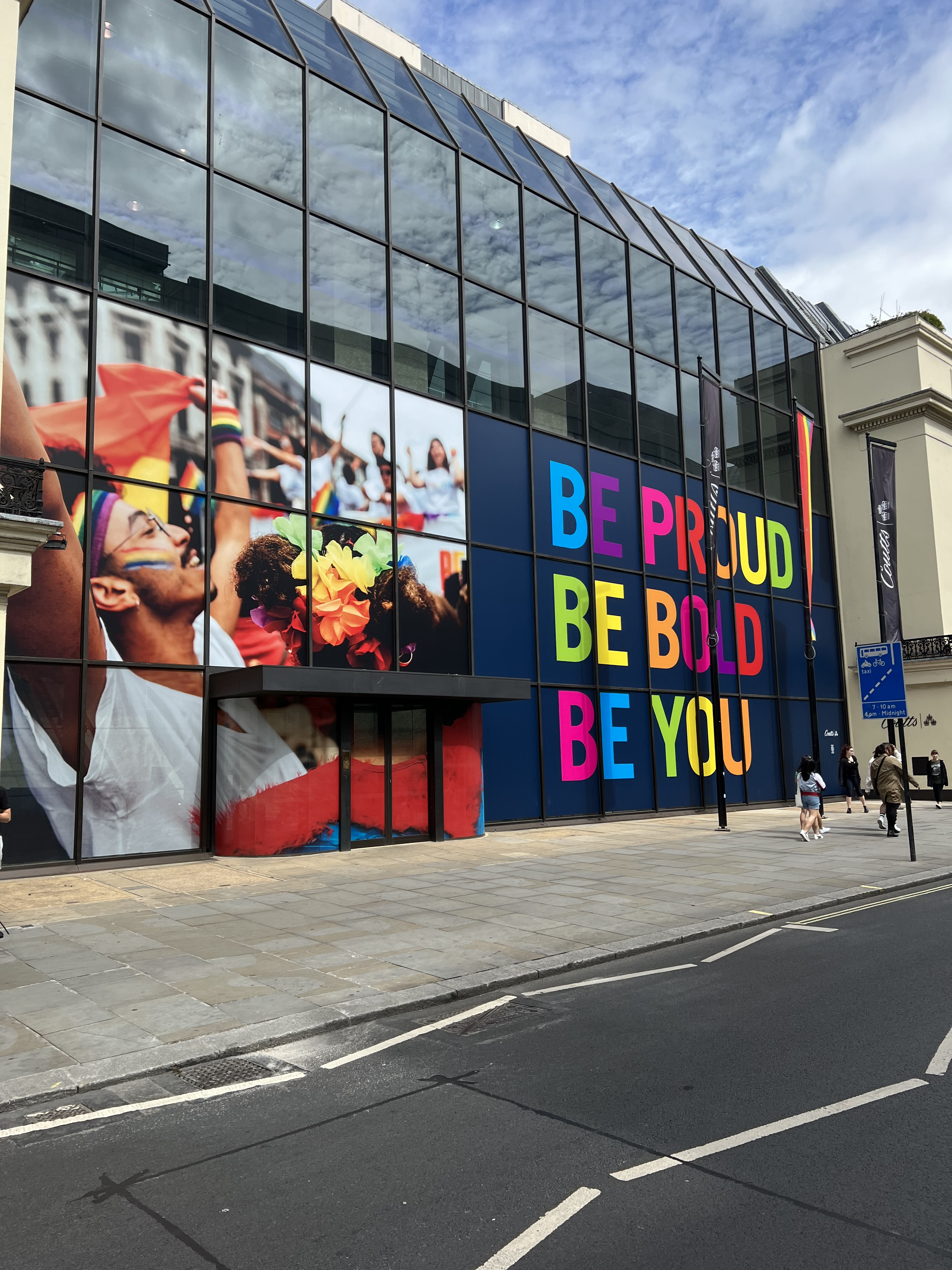
Coutts' London headquarters featuring a LGBTQ pride display, 2022

Known as the pink pound in the United Kingdom, the British gay market is estimated to be worth up to £6 billion a year.

The Pink Pound is often considered to be responsible for the high sales of specific products seen to be favored by a large number of gay people, most noticeably music sales of records by gay icons such as Madonna, Lady Gaga, Kylie Minogue and Cher. A range of large corporations have recently realised the power of the Pink Pound and have begun to directly market their products towards the gay community through advertising in the gay press. In June 2006 a specialized marketing conference called the Pink Pound Conference was held in London and a similar conference was held in November 2006 by the Market Research Society.

Groups and organizations concerned with the ghettoisation, conformity, and commercialism of the pink pound include OutRage!, the NUS LGBT Campaign and the Queer Youth Alliance—paralleling the more general criticisms of pink money.

A large market of goods and services for gay people has appeared in recent years, including gay wedding services, gay press including radio and television, and domestic services such as builders and plumbers. In 2001 several gay companies produced pink stickers and stuck them onto thousands of Pound Coins which are still in circulation.

== In the United States ==
Known as the pink dollar or "Dorothy dollar" in the United States, estimates of the US LGBT market put its value at approximately $790 billion in the year 2012. In addition, many of these households are known by demographers as "DINKY"—which generally have more disposable income.

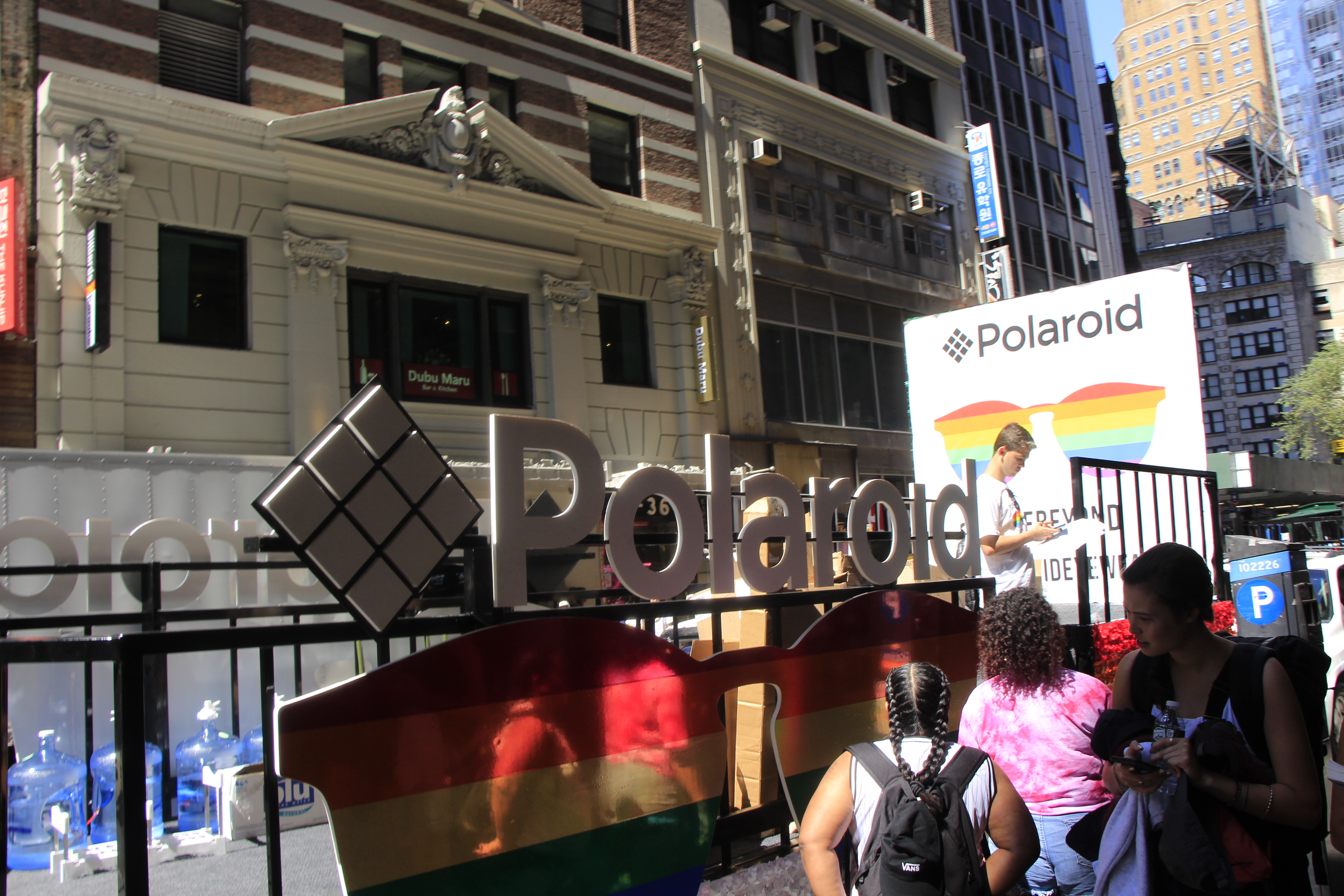
The LGBT Pride float representing Polaroid for the Stonewall 50 - WorldPride NYC event

Some US industries have tried to focus on these markets with specific advertising campaigns; for example, American Airlines saw its earnings from LGBT people rise from $20 million in 1994 to $193.5 million in 1999, after formation of a team devoted to gay and lesbian marketing.

In politics, pink money has been viewed as controversial, mainly due to pressure from conservative groups promoting traditional values—for instance, Presidential Candidate Michael Dukakis publicly disassociated himself from pink money during the 1988 US presidential election. However, more recently pink money has become politically acceptable, especially as a major source of liberal funding for the Democratic Party—in 2000, contributing $5 million to the Democratic National Committee alone, "a total that puts them among the top tier of Democratic givers, along with unions, [and] trial lawyers". Major candidates such as Bill Clinton, Al Gore, John Edwards, Barack Obama, Hillary Clinton, Howard Dean, John Kerry, and Joe Biden have actively campaigned for the gay vote.

Since around 2005, Bob Witeck's Washington, D.C.–based communications firm Witeck Communications has conducted an annual buying power study of U.S. gay, lesbian, bisexual and transgender adults. In 2016, Witeck's analysis determined that the combined buying power of American LGBT adults was $917 billion in 2015, a 3.7% increase from the previous year. This figure approached the combined buying power of other American minority groups, such as black Americans ($1.2 trillion) and Hispanic Americans ($1.3 trillion), and exceeds that of Asian Americans ($825 billion).

== See also ==
- Double-duty dollar, a similar concept in African-American community
- Gay friendly
- Gay village
- Gaymer, a name for LGBT video game players
- Pink capitalism
