= Corporate sociopolitical activism =

Public demonstration of corporate support or opposition to a partisan sociopolitical issue

Corporate sociopolitical activism (CSA) is a firm's public demonstration of support or opposition to a partisan sociopolitical issue. CSA has become increasingly prominent in the 2010s and 2020s, as firms have taken stances on issues such as climate change, racial justice, reproductive rights, gun control, immigration, LGBTQ rights, and gender equality.

Some commentators use terms such as woke capitalism, woke capital, and stakeholder capitalism, to refer to forms of marketing, advertising, and corporate structures that pertain to sociopolitical standpoints apparently tied to social-justice and activist causes. The term "woke capital" was coined by columnist Ross Douthat in "The Rise of Woke Capital", an opinion piece written for and published in The New York Times in 2018.

CSA is comparable to but distinct from two related firm activities: corporate social responsibility (CSR) and corporate political activity (CPA). Firms may engage in CSA to appeal to purpose-driven ideals, as well as contribute to more strategic motives, in line with consumers' existing preferences for moral purchasing options. A recent study found that 64% of global consumers choose to buy or boycott a given brand on the basis of its political leanings, a result suggesting the increasing importance of ethical consumerism practices.

A 2020 survey of CMOs revealed that a growing proportion of marketing leaders find it acceptable to make changes to products and services in response to political issues (47%), have executives speak out on political issues (33%), and use marketing communications to speak out on political issues (28%). Furthermore, brands engaged in an unprecedented level of activist behavior in response to consumers protesting racial injustice in 2020.

Firms have historically shown reluctance to vocalize stances on controversial sociopolitical matters, with the understanding that doing so could sever certain stakeholder relationships; however, modern cultural shifts have precipitated a "hyper-partisan" climate, leading to demand for firms to exercise purpose-driven efforts in the marketplace. As stated by Richard Edelman, chief executive officer (CEO) of Edelman, "Brands are now being pushed to go beyond their classic business interests to become advocates. It is a new relationship between a company and consumer, where a purchase is premised on the brand's willingness to live its values, act with purpose, and, if necessary, make the leap into activism."

== Definition ==
CSA is a unique form of cause-related firm behavior defined broadly by two distinct characteristics: publicity and partisanship. Specifically, CSA involves a firm's public support of or opposition to a partisan sociopolitical issue. Such issues are described as "salient unresolved social matters on which societal and institutional opinion is split, thus potentially engendering acrimonious debate among groups". Notably, while the controversy surrounding a given issue can change or be resolved, a firm's efforts may be considered CSA to the extent that they reflect engagement with an issue defined as partisan at a given point in time, politics, and culture. Furthermore, the term "brand activism" has been used to describe similar efforts by individual brands (i.e. owned by firms) to vocalize public stances on sociopolitical issues; brand activism can, thus, be considered CSA delivered through a brand's voice.

=== Conceptual distinctions ===
==== Corporate social responsibility ====
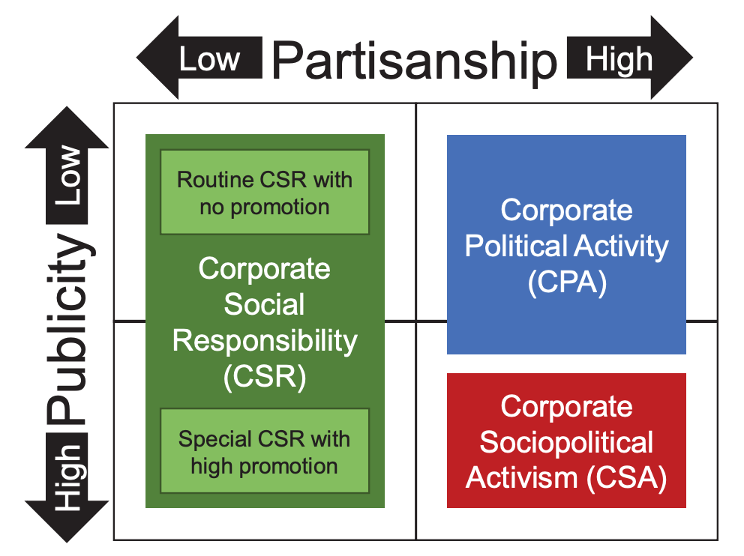
Conceptual distinctions among CSA, CSR, and CPA

CSR involves firms' contributions to widely favored societal goals (e.g. community resources, education, and donations to disease prevention research) via philanthropic or charitable efforts, CSA pertains to a firm's engagement in causes for which there is no universally acceptable correct response. Furthermore, CSA may involve a lower level of monetary investment (e.g. a press release or an open letter) compared to CSR; however, there is greater risk associated with CSA, due in part to the potential for backlash from various stakeholders.

==== Corporate political activity ====
CSA is distinct from CPA—a firm's efforts (e.g. campaign contributions, lobbying, and donations to political action committees) to sway political processes and gain policy-related market advantages. While both types of firm activities reflect involvement in the political process, they differ in the extent to which they are publicized. CSA is often utilized as a public demonstration of a firm's core values and principles. Conversely, CPA is an often-discreet activity that is typically made public only through "accidental disclosure".

== Examples ==
2019 promotional video from Nickelodeon presenting various instances of progressive messaging in the 1990s series Rugrats

Firms have increasingly taken activist stances on sociopolitical issues across a variety of domains.

=== Racial justice ===
Firms have spoken out about racial justice in a number of ways (e.g., affirming support for the Black Lives Matter movement and donating a portion of profits to civil rights organizations). Among the most prominent examples of racial justice CSAs came in September 2018, when Nike announced football player Colin Kaepernick as the spokesperson for its thirtieth-anniversary advertising campaign. Notably, Kaepernick stirred national debate in 2016 by kneeling during the National Anthem in protest of racial inequality and police brutality in the United States. In Nike's campaign, Kaepernick said, "Believe in something, even if it means sacrificing everything." News agencies characterized this tagline as implicit support for Kaepernick's platform of racial justice advocacy.

While Nike's decision initially sparked consumer backlash and a dip in its stock price, the firm's value reached an all-time high only a week later. According to a Quinnipiac University poll, much of the persistent consumer support for the ad came from consumers between 18 and 34, two-thirds of whom approved of Nike's actions. This case has been considered a critical turning point in the emergence of CSA as a prominent brand practice. Additional examples of racial justice CSAs include the following:

- Home Depot CEO Craig Meaner said in a statement, "We are all confronting deep pain and anguish over the senseless killing of George Floyd, Ahmaud Arbery, and other unarmed Black men and women in our country. We cannot ignore that their deaths are part of a pattern of racism and reflect the harsh reality that as a nation we are much too far from fulfilling the promise of equal justice for all."
- Netflix promoted a new Black Lives Matter collection to U.S. subscribers, featuring a number of television and movie titles about racial injustice and the experience of Black Americans.
- Walmart announced that it will donate $100 million over five years to create a new center for racial equity.

=== LGBTQ rights ===
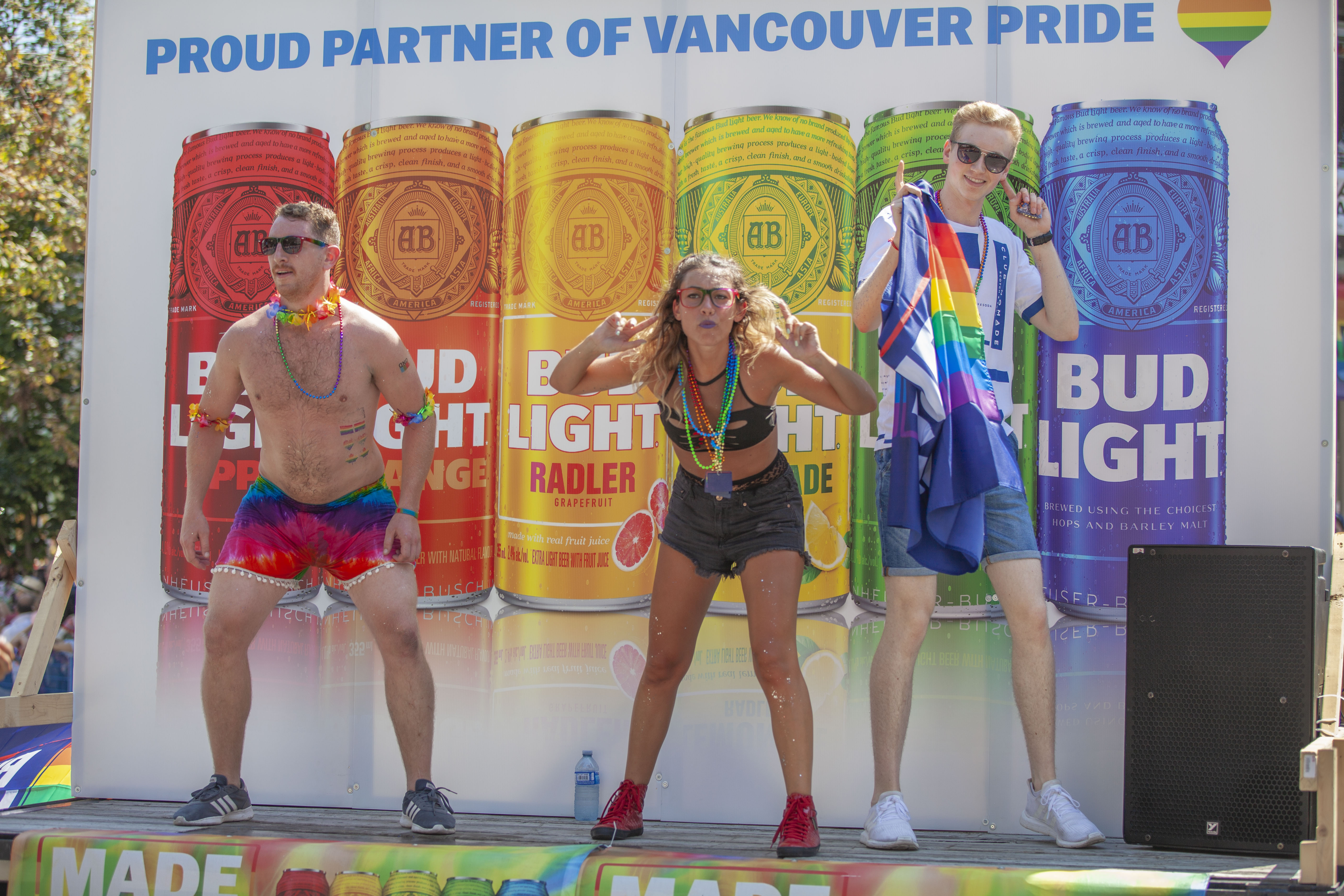
A Bud Light advertisement at an LGBTQ pride event

Firms have utilized both internal and external resources to take a stand on issues facing the LGBTQ community. For instance, many firms act as corporate sponsors of Pride parades internationally and assist in LGBTQ community-building efforts. Published since 2002, the Human Rights Campaign has utilized its Corporate Equality Index (CEI) to measure the extent to which American businesses treat equitably their LGBTQ employees, customers, and investors. Criteria used to assess companies include, among others, a written policy of non-discrimination based on sexual orientation, gender identity, and gender expression; appropriate and respectful advertising to the LGBTQ community; and transgender-inclusive health benefits.

There has been an increase in the number of firms with a perfect CEI rating every year since the tool's inception. Such firms frequently release statements and press releases to express satisfaction at having been recognized for their diversity and inclusivity efforts. Notably, many brands have also released Pride-related merchandise in recent years to signal support for LGBTQ rights, as well as position themselves as advocates for LGBTQ consumers.

- Converse released a collection of Pride-inspired low- and high-top sneakers featuring a rainbow flag with a brown and black stripe dedicated to queer people of color. Also included in this collection was a pair of sneakers adorned with the pink, light blue, and white colors of the transgender flag.
- Sephora's "We Love Pride" make-up collection featured a metallic red lipstick called "Love Is Love". The brand donated a portion of sales to a variety of LGBTQ charities.
- Fossil released its second annual Pride Watch, featuring a bezel with all the colors of the rainbow flag. U.S. sales benefitted the Hetrick-Martin Institute, the nation's oldest and largest LGBTQ youth organization.

=== Climate change ===
While sustainable business practices have long been a component of firms' CSR activities, some companies have taken an activist stance in recent years to address climate change more explicitly. For example, the brand Patagonia has established itself as a chief market-based environmental justice advocate. Its November 2011 "Don't Buy This Jacket" spot in the New York Times served as both an advertisement for the firm's merchandise and an imperative for consumers to reduce their carbon footprint. The ad's message leveraged an anti-consumerist ideology to encourage the purchase of long-lasting outdoor apparel and deter the proliferation of the fast fashion industry. Most large companies across the world have made commitments to climate change. For example:

- Amazon announced in 2019 that it would transition to 80% renewable energy usage by 2024, and then to zero emissions by 2030. The firm's CEO Jeff Bezos also launched the Bezos Earth Fund in February 2020, committing $10 billion to assist in "any effort that offers a real possibility to help preserve and protect the natural world".
- Google announced in September 2020 that it is investing in manufacturing regions to create new carbon-free energy and help cities reduce their emissions.

=== Gun control ===
A number of major firearms sellers have modified their gun sales policies, particularly as a response to mass shootings taking place in the U.S. Two such notable examples are the following:

- Ed Stack, CEO of Dick's Sporting Goods, announced in February 2018 that stores would end the sales of high-capacity magazines, as well as sales of guns to persons under the age of 21. The firm also took legal action by urging Congress to ban assault-style weapons, raise the minimum age to purchase a gun to 21, and outlaw sales of high-capacity magazines and bump stocks. The firm cited the Parkland high school shooting in Parkland, Florida, as an event that directly influenced its decisions.
- Walmart CEO Doug McMillon released a statement in 2019 containing news of the firm's plans to discontinue sales of short-barrel rifle ammunition, handgun ammunition, and handguns. This statement also requested that customers no longer openly carry firearms into Walmart or Sam's Club stores, including those in states in which "open carry" is permitted. The firm cited the 2019 El Paso Walmart shooting, which took place in a Walmart store, as a critical incident shaping its decisions.

=== Other domains ===
Firms have engaged in CSA in a number of other domains. Below are select examples.

==== Reproductive health care ====
M.A.C. Cosmetics has worked with Planned Parenthood since 2008 and contributed over $2 million to the organization. According to John Demsey, executive group president of the brand's parent company Estée Lauder, "It is so important for people of all ages, all races and all genders to get the accurate information and care they need so they can live their best, healthiest lives, but we see that a lot of people aren't seeking that information and care because of stigmas that disproportionately affect women, people of color and the LGBTQ community."

==== Net neutrality ====
Burger King advocated for net neutrality with a January 2018 ad that illustrated the concept of paid prioritization through hamburger sales—customers were told they would have to wait longer for their food, unless they were willing to pay a premium for immediate service.

==== Gender non-discrimination ====
Target issued a statement in September 2016 encouraging store employees and patrons to use the restroom or fitting room facility that corresponds with their gender identity.

==== Immigration ====
In January 2017, nearly 100 Silicon Valley firms filed an amicus brief against the Trump administration's anti-immigration policy directed at refugees, travelers, and visa holders originating from predominantly Muslim portions of the world.

==== Controversial symbols ====
NASCAR announced in July 2020 that it would ban the Confederate flag from all its racing venues.

== Potential business benefits ==
Research has uncovered the broader financial implications of CSA on firm value including improving firm's attractiveness to a wider segment of investors and customers. On average, investors respond negatively to CSA, though there are a number of factors that may buffer or even reverse this relationship. Most notably, a firm's CSA elicits positive abnormal stock returns when there is high alignment between the firm's CSA and the values of its stakeholders (e.g. customers, employees, and state legislators). In particular, researchers observed an increase in sales growth over the next quarter and year when CSA aligned with customer values.

A number of CSA characteristics have been shown to further heighten investor response: if the activism takes the form of an action, is announced by the CEO, is not justified by a business objective, and is announced alone (vs. in a coalition with other firms). Notably, managers may find it especially appropriate to engage in CSA if they are deeply committed to activism, and it aligns with their strategic objectives (i.e. acquiring a more liberal or conservative customer base). Still, CSA requires strategic deliberation. CSA activities may signal to stakeholders that the firm is willing to engage in risky behaviors and even divert resources from profit-generating activities. Given the enduring nature of activism, it is often plausible for investors to believe CSA serves as a value-based indication of a firm's future decisions, particularly those related to purpose, reputation, and relationship management.

== Criticism and concerns ==
Critics have expressed concern about the degree to which CSA is helpful, either for advancing sociopolitical causes or as a firm activity more generally. By the mid-2010s, forms of rhetoric that were later retroactively labelled as "woke" had entered mainstream media and were being used in marketing and advertising; campaigns associated with this trend have been generally perceived by consumers as insincere and inauthentic, and have provoked cultural backlashes.

Cultural scientists Akane Kanai and Rosalind Gill described woke capitalism as a then-"dramatically intensifying" trend in which public relations pertains to the concerns of historically marginalized groups (such as in terms of race, gender and religion), using them as mascots in advertisements with messages of empowerment. On the one hand, this creates an individualized and depoliticized idea of social justice, using depictions of social action to signify an increase in self-confidence; on the other hand, the omnipresent visibility in advertising of minorities can also amplify a backlash against their equality. For people in lower economic strata, the equality of these minorities thus becomes indispensable to the maintenance of capitalism, with the minorities being seen as responsible for the losses of the system.

=== Woke-washing ===
The term woke-washing was used in 2019 by Alan Jope, chief executive of Unilever, who warned that brands which failed to take verifiable action on their rhetoric could "further destroy trust in our industry". Helen Lewis held the opinion that cancel culture is the result of what she calls "the iron law of woke capitalism", and believes that it is used for inexpensive messaging as a substitute for genuine reform. Will Hutton wrote that he believed woke capitalism is "the only way forward", citing principles of corporate responsibility. Alternatively, Elizabeth Bruenig observed that while woke capitalism has been seen as an evolution of capitalism that can create unprecedented benefits for the public good, it remains a form of capitalism and hence cannot be celebrated without aligning with capitalist interests; similarly, Andrew V. Abela held the opinion that it does little to actually further progressive causes.

A common argument is that firms are profit-seeking and thus care more about image and reputation than the causes they address. Some have referred to firms' political behavior as akin to "woke-washing", a pejorative term adapted from the similar concepts of "greenwashing" and "pinkwashing". Woke-washing is a critique leveraged against firms thought to "appropriate the language of social activism into marketing material". Critics have further argued that firms may utilize greater capital on the appearance of progressivism (i.e. through advertisements and promotional efforts) than on actual cause-related awareness or fundraising efforts. In such circumstances, activism has been criticized as a deceptive marketing tool for capturing demand among belief-driven consumers. Action-based follow-through could be important for fostering perceptions of authentic connection to supported sociopolitical causes. In a 2020 Harvard Business Review article, journalists Erin Dowell and Marlette Jackson said, "Empty company statements can seem to say that Black lives only matter to big business when there's profit to be made."

=== Corroding democratic values ===
Some warn that the rise of corporate social activism could corrode democratic values and threaten the public's faith in democratic systems. The "market values of businesses could supplant the moral values of society" and social activism for the public good may not align with a corporation's driving force: profits.

== "Go woke, go broke" counter-movement ==
Beginning to a major degree in the 2020s, members of the American right have perpetuated efforts to boycott companies that openly support "woke" causes. The phrase "Go woke, go broke" has been an American political umbrella catchphrase used by right-wing groups to criticize and boycott businesses publicly supporting progressive policies, including empowering women, LGBTQ people (i.e. rainbow capitalism) and critical race theory ("going woke"), claiming that stock value and business performance will inevitably suffer ("going broke") as a result of adopting values of diversity, equity, and inclusion. Many companies subject to "go woke go broke" campaigns, including AB InBev, Target, and the Walt Disney Company have seen declines in revenue, profit, and/or stock value as a result of the "go woke go broke" backlash campaigns. Some figures in business, such as Mark Cuban, have defended companies engaging in "wokeness" by arguing that engaging in social justice causes reflects companies caring about their customers.

When customers boycotted various companies in 2023, such as Bud Light, Target, and The Walt Disney Company, these companies experienced a loss in sales and stock value drops, while Disney lost subscribers to its streaming platform Disney+. Experts said these losses could not be solely attributed to the boycotts and that they could stem from other causes, such as the companies' responses to the boycotts. Some movies said to be "woke" have gone on to financial success, such as Greta Gerwig's 2023 movie Barbie, while others, such as The Marvels, released to a record low box office for Marvel. A 2025 study that analyzed responses to 10,000 films concluded that there was no consistent pattern linking progressive themes in movies to harm in the box office results. The study suggested problems may be linked instead to poor execution, such as "heavy-handed political messaging, clumsy canon changes, or anachronistic dialogue".

=== Validity ===
Some researchers have found little validity in the phrase, arguing instead that diversity and inclusivity may be beneficial. In 2024, Unstereotype Alliance, a business alliance convened by UN Women that promotes inclusive advertising, published a study performed by researchers from the Saïd Business School at the University of Oxford, which analyzed data from 392 brands across 58 countries found that the catchphrase "Go woke, go broke" is wrong. The study found that businesses that authentically and positively portray diverse backgrounds led to a 3.5% increase in shorter-term sales and 16% increase in the longer term. The study was regarded as a rebuke to the claim that "going woke" meant companies were "going broke", with reports calling the phrase a "myth" as a result.

In September 2025, film industry analyst and researcher Stephen Follows published an analysis of responses to 10,000 films, concluding that there was no consistent pattern that would indicate that progressive themes in movies negatively affected the success of movies. Summarizing "So is 'Go Woke, Go Broke' true? The short answer is no", but added "it's not without grains of truth." Follows' analysis found that while some movies with "woke-adjacent theme" may be successful and others fail, "the same is true of films without those themes." His research instead found that the bad outcomes of movies are a result of poor execution, such as "heavy-handed political messaging, clumsy canon changes, or anachronistic dialogue reduce audience satisfaction and profitability." His research highlighted that inauthentic changes or portrayal, such as in historical movies can increase the risk of failures, while other genres, such as horror, thriller, sports or music films actively benefitted from "diverse casting and identity-driven stories" leading to a positive effect on commercial success. Follows' final conclusion was that "'Go Woke, Go Broke' does not hold up as a general rule. Films are too diverse, and audience responses too varied, for a cute slogan to explain outcomes across the whole industry." Follows nevertheless noted that there are risk: "Audiences react poorly when identity-driven changes are seen as imposed rather than motivated by character or story. The risks multiply when several shifts occur at once.

=== Early usage ===
The phrase "get woke, go broke" is believed to have been coined by the American military science fiction author John Ringo in 2018. It originated in a dispute involving Ringo's invitation to ConCarolinas where objections were raised because Ringo wrote books in which the central character has impulses to rape. The organizers rescinded their invitation, saying that they could not guarantee he would be free of hostile actions from those who objected to his presence at the convention. The incident was reported in a right-wing Web site that has since ceased operation, Dangerous.com; it said that according to Ringo, the convention "pushed its conservative members out of its planning committee, attendance dropped over years, and it's now defunct." Ringo characterized the effect on organizations that give in to the demands of social activists as "Get woke, go broke". The phrase is then interpreted as a reference to companies that engage in politically correct activities as part of their corporate strategy, but only to see such strategy result in significant financial loss for them.

The phrase quickly gained popular usage by those on the right after it was coined. One of the early incidents the phrase was invoked concerned the use of Colin Kaepernick in Nike's "Just Do It" ad campaign in September 2018, which drew criticism from Donald Trump and calls for its boycott. Nike nevertheless continued with its campaign. It also reported increased sales, and this has been used as an example where a company that made a commitment and stayed the course can reap the benefits despite alienating some customers. The phrase is also used in political discourse in the United Kingdom.

Another early application of the phrase involved Gillette. In January 2019, Gillette ran an Internet campaign "The Best Men Can Be" that criticised toxic masculinity and suggested how men should act. While the campaign received praise from some quarters, it also received widespread criticism from men who were their core customers, and led to calls for boycott. In July 2019, some months after the ad was released, the parent company of Gillette, Procter & Gamble, announced that while it had record sales for other products, it took an $8 billion write-down on its revenue for Gillette. The company said that the write-down was due to currency fluctuation, greater competition and a shrinking market as men shave less frequently. Critics of the campaign, however, believed that the campaign had hurt the company, and this campaign has often been cited as an example of "get woke, go broke".

Right-wing politicians and individuals used the slogan to refer to the knockout round loss of the United States women's national soccer team (USWNT) against Sweden during the 2023 FIFA Women's World Cup, particularly player Megan Rapinoe, who was noted for missing a penalty kick during the shootouts against Sweden's team. The USWNT supports various progressive values, which conservatives argued was the reason they lost. James Dator of SB Nation and Alex Abad-Santos of Vox reported the loss stemming from player injuries, organizational reasons and play, noting Rapinoe did not enter the field until extra time.

=== The Walt Disney Company ===
After the passage of Florida's Parental Rights in Education Act, colloquially known as the "Don't Say Gay law" due to its restrictions on "classroom discussion" or giving "classroom instruction" (Note: The preamble to the act utilizes the phrase "classroom discussion". The relevant numbered section of the act utilizes the phrase "classroom instruction".) about sexual orientation or gender identity from kindergarten through 3rd grade, The Walt Disney Company initially did not take a public stance on the matter. However, as public pressure mounted and in response to employees' concerns, Disney eventually publicly opposed the bill. This stance led to a dispute with Republican Governor Ron DeSantis, who had supported the bill's passage and later expansion to all grades K–12 and has repeatedly criticized Disney for being "woke" and accusations of "grooming". As a result, the Florida legislature repealed and renamed the Reedy Creek Improvement District, a special taxation ward controlled by Disney and hosting the Walt Disney World resort, to the Central Florida Tourism Oversight District. Disney responded by filing a lawsuit against Governor DeSantis and cancelling their expansion plans in Florida.

Disney's streaming service Disney+ was reported in February 2023 to have lost over two million subscribers for the last quarter of 2022, over 4 million the first quarter of 2023, and over 11 million worldwide the following quarter. Right-wing commentators have attributed the decline to Disney's "woke activism"; The New York Times, however, noted that the losses came from India after Disney+ lost the rights to Indian Premier League cricket matches, while the rest of the world showed an increase of 800,000 subscribers.

In 2023, a number of films released by Disney under-performed on the box office, including Ant-Man and the Wasp: Quantumania, Indiana Jones and the Dial of Destiny, and The Marvels, under-performance attributed by some to Disney having gone "woke". Others, however, attributed the decline to the expectation that Disney-related films would eventually be released on Disney+, and potential customers chose to wait for the films to be streamed. The 2025 Disney's live-action remake Snow White, widely described by its detractors as "woke", under-performed at the box-office resulting in large expected losses for the studio. Analysts, however, point to reasons other than 'anti-woke backlash', such as the audience not connecting with the film resulting in mixed reviews, a declining interest in a character from older film, the failure of the studio to counter bad publicity, or that Disney's strategy of live-action adaptation has become "tired". Nevertheless, film historian Jonathan Kuntz argued that "Disney in the 21st century has been at the forefront of foregrounding race and gender issues and pushing a political agenda ... if you have a political agenda you are going to inevitably alienate half the audience."

=== Bud Light ===
The beer company AB InBev, which owns Bud Light, partnered with transgender influencer Dylan Mulvaney on April 1, 2023, sending her custom Bud Light cans featuring her face to celebrate the anniversary of her "365 Days of Girlhood" series, which documented her gender transition. In response, several notable figures on the American right called for a boycott of the company. In the month following the advertisement, Bud Light sales dropped. During a conference call with investors on May 4, 2023, AB InBev's CEO Michel Doukeris said the drop in Bud Light sales "would represent around 1% of our overall global volumes for that period." The company placed its marketing vice president, who authorized the promotion, Alissa Heinerscheid, on administrative leave.

Bernd Debusmann Jr, writing for BBC News, reported that experts believed the boycott's success depended on the company's response, and they considered Bud Light to have made a mistake when handling the boycott. Public relations professor Tony D'Angelo considered the company's stance to be "waffling", stating "If you waffle, then people are going to rightly question what they really stand for". While research suggests that consumer boycotts tended to be short-lived, the effect of this boycott continued for some months, and Bud Light lost its leading position as America's best-selling beer, with the company's profits in the US dropping by more than 28% in the quarter. Owen Myers of the Guardian described the boycott as one of the biggest in US history.

=== Cinema ===
A study by Film data analyst Stephen Follows in 2025 analyzed responses to over 10,000 films concluded that there was no consistent pattern linking progressive themes in movies to their box office results. The study instead said that "Problems … are linked to execution," The study noted that for some genres such as horror, sports and music, diversity and identity narratives in films can have "substantially positive" effect on the box-office. However, for big-budget franchises, a film perceived to have deviated from its "core canon" due to execution issues may increase financial risks, saying "Heavy-handed political messaging, clumsy canon changes, or anachronistic dialogue reduce audience satisfaction and profitability."

The phrase was notably used in the context of the Marvel Cinematic Universe films Captain Marvel and Black Panther: Wakanda Forever, which challenged the notion of diversity backlash and the success of boycotts against the films. Regarding Captain Marvel, Bethany Lacina, writing for The Washington Post, concluded that there likely was no strong conservative resistance when she analyzed search traffic and Fox News coverage of the film. Lacina also noted that superhero movies the alt-right has objected to have performed well in conservative parts of the United States. After The Marvels debuted in 2023 to a record low opening for the MCU, Forbes published an article on the film's anti-woke backlash. The article quoted film industry analyst David A. Gross as saying "female-powered entertainment is enjoying extraordinary success right now, but audiences are not embracing these stories".

Barbie released to 2023's largest opening weekend as well as the largest ever opening weekend for a female director. Barbie's feminist themes and inclusion of a transgender actress triggered backlash from some conservatives, who argued that the film's overt messages made it less entertaining. Barbie would go on to gross over $1.4 billion and a positive critical reception.

=== Target ===
The American retailer Target released its annual LGBT pride merchandise collection in May 2023, which sparked a boycott from American conservatives, after viral posts by Gays Against Groomers and other social media accounts falsely claimed that the company was marketing "tuck-friendly" swimsuits to minors. According to Reuters, these swimsuits, which are designed to "tuck male genitalia", were sold only in the women's section. The company's stock price decreased by over 10% following the release of the products, and the company has been the focus of scrutiny from several GOP politicians.

== See also ==
- Corporate political responsibility
- Girl power
- Hashtag activism
- Managerial state
- Pinkwashing
- Rainbow capitalism
- Slacktivism
- Social justice warrior
- Virtue signalling
- 2020s anti-LGBTQ movement in the United States
- Sweet Baby Inc.
