= Nationalism and gender =

Scholarship on nationalism and gender explores the processes by which gender affects and is impacted by the development of nationalism. Sometimes referred to as "gendered nationalism," gender and nationalism describes the phenomena whereby conceptions of the state or nation, including notions of citizenship, sovereignty, or national identity contribute to or arise in relation to gender roles.

== Overview and key themes ==
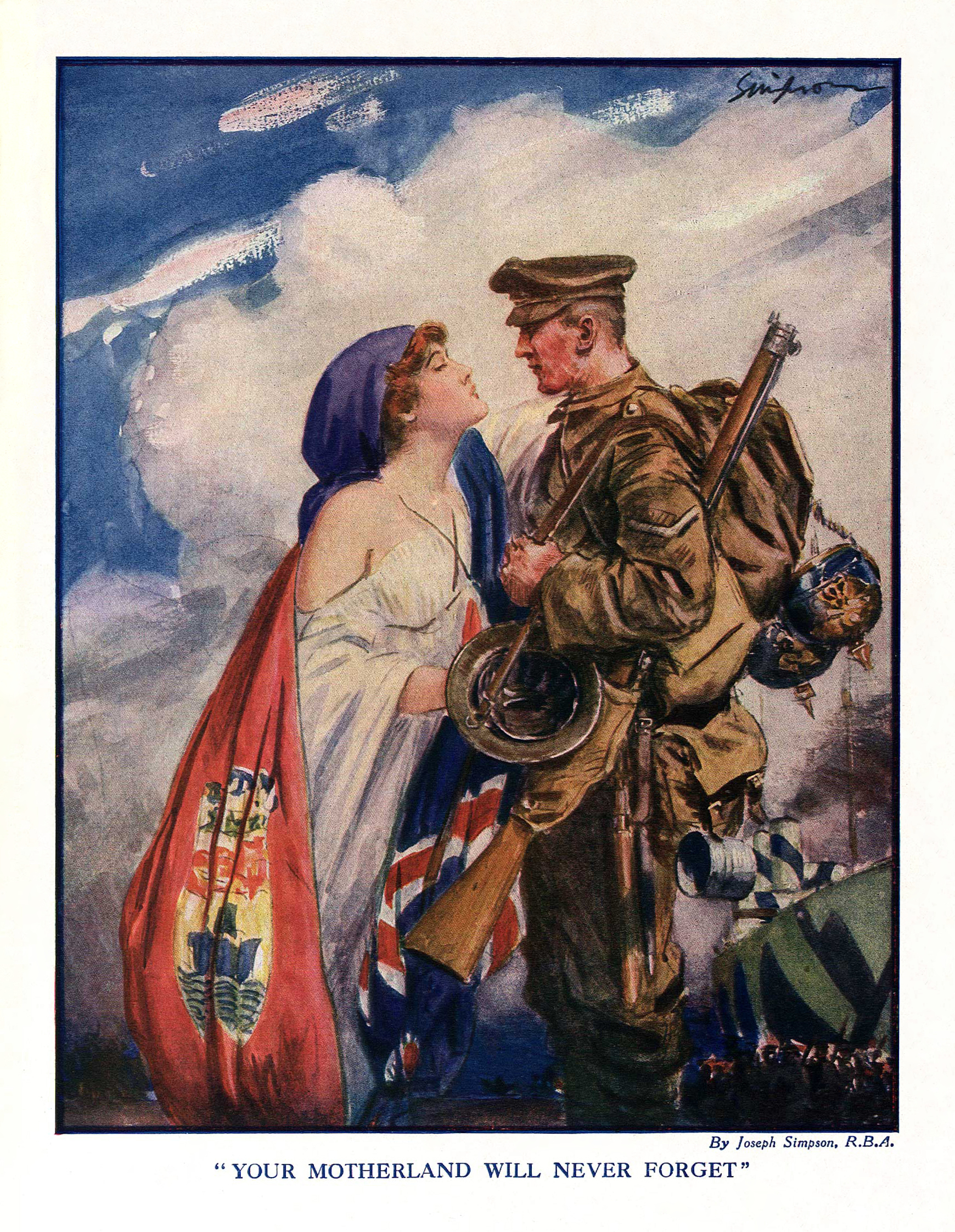
"Your motherland will never forget", WWI-era illustration from Canada in Khaki. Artist: Joseph Simpson, restored by Adam Cuerden.

Though there are different varieties of nationalism, gender and sexuality affect the way nationalism develops in specific contexts. Different gender systems and gender roles are instituted by or invoked to support nationalist movements in differing ways.

For example, in nationalist movements, the identity of the nation state is often imagined or personified in gendered ways, usually in a patriarchal context. The physical land itself (i.e. the "Motherland") is often symbolically considered to be a "female body" in constant danger of violation by "foreign" males, while national pride and protectiveness of "her" borders is gendered as masculine. As V. Spike Peterson writes, "Also implicit in the patriarchal metaphor is a tacit agreement that men who cannot defend their woman/nation against rape have lost their 'claim' to that body, that land. Clearly, the nation/woman is being denied agency. Rather, 'she' is man's possession, and like other enabling vessels (boats, planes) is valued as a means for achieving male-defined ends: the sovereign/man drives the ship of state. Thus, the motherland is female but the state and its citizen-warriors are male."

Legal rights related to gender and sexuality are also impacted by nationalist movements. Kumari Jayawardena's work has explored how the desire for legal recognition and equity motivated women's participation in nationalist movements in Asia. Relatedly, Emil Edenborg has investigated how opposition to legal rights for LGBT people in Russia and Chechnya is linked to particular nationalist discourses. Scholarship on gender and nationalism has tended to examine the relationships between gender, sexuality, and national structures by exploring themes of men and masculinity, women and femininity, heteronormativity and sexuality, or along the intersection of religion, race, gender and nationalism.

=== Men, masculinity, and nationalism ===
Normative understandings of masculinity and male behavior vary across cultural, historical, or geographical contexts. Because male behavior and masculinity impact social and political relations, men and masculinity affect the development of nationalism. George Mosse has argued that modern masculine stereotypes exist in a mutual relationship to modern nationalism. Nationalism and the structure and expansion of the state are closely related, and institutions like the military as well as state projects such as imperialism and colonialism are often dominated by male participants.

Shirin M. Rai has also pointed out how economic development tied to nation-building projects in postcolonial contexts is often gendered as masculine, ultimately devaluing the economic stability of women and subaltern men. Within national structures, hierarchical models of authority and decision-making often prioritize men's authority, legal rights, labor, and sexuality. Symbolically and ideologically, nationalist movements frequently valorize masculine projections of honor, patriotism, bravery, physical virility, rationality, individualism, and duty.

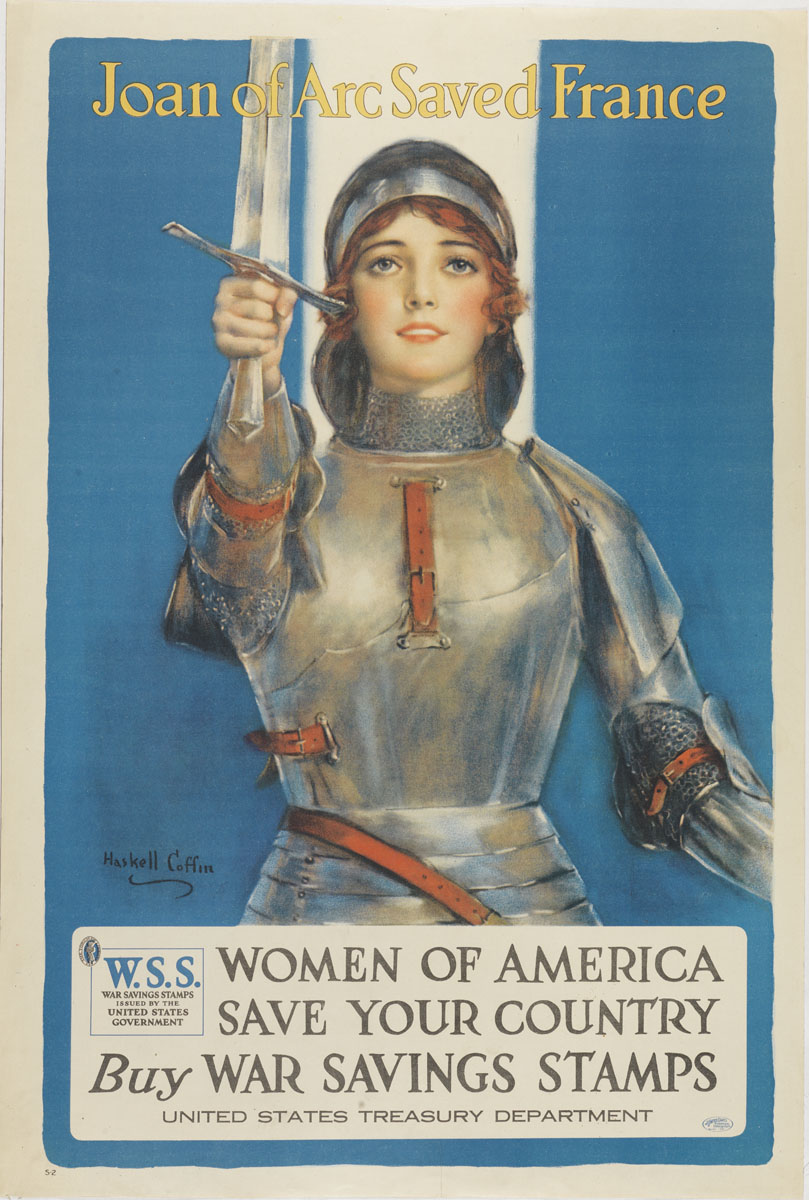
World War I-era poster urges to American women to buy War Saving Stamps by using Joan of Arc as a symbol of female patriotism. Issued by the United States Treasury Department; artist: Haskell Coffin.

=== Women, femininity, and nationalism ===
Specific social and political roles expected of women are not only tied to conceptions of femininity, but are also linked to local and national power relations. Social responsibilities, such as child-rearing, or particular forms of employment and interpersonal engagement become feminized and expected of women. Women's labor and women's bodies have provided material and symbolic resources to nationalist and colonial projects. National identities are often linked to women and their reproductive capacity.

When women resist these expectations, projections, and roles, their resistance impacts the development of national identity. At the same time, nationalist movements have also provided disenfranchised women with potential opportunities to be treated as active participants within political and social spheres. Summarizing the relationship between women and nationalism, Nira Yuval-Davis and Flora Anthias distinguish five forms by which women participate in nationalism. In their framework, women act as: biological producers of new national members, symbols of national difference, carriers and creators of cultural narratives, agents enforcing the boundaries of the nation, active participants in national movements.

=== Heteronormativity, sexuality, and nationalism ===
Nationalist movements are often aligned with heteronormative family models, that is, heterosexual family units assuming male leadership, female reproduction, as well as natural and complementary roles between men and women. Thus, nationalism has been identified as a tool to support heteronormative structures of power that exclude or subjugate sexual minorities and those outside of the male-female gender binary. These kind of movements also tend to emphasize heterosexual ideals as an antagonism of countries where LGBTI rights have been legislated, in a dynamic that some have called heteronationalism.

=== Religion, race, gender, and nationalism ===
Race and religion intersect with the development of nationalism and impact how gender roles are structured in relation to nationalism. Racialization, the process of ascribing race to particular social groups or individuals, always corresponds to particular configurations of gender, class, and nationalism. For example, according to scholar Anne McClintock, the development of Afrikaner nationalism in South Africa was dependent on the rise of an apartheid doctrine among Afrikaner people and was also tied to gender roles that positioned women as subservient to men and with responsibilities of service to the nation. Religion may also affect participation in nationalist movements, nationalist discourse, and motivations for establishing nation-states.

The inclusion or expulsion of particular religious communities may be aligned with particular forms of gendered nationalist discourse. Theorist Jasbir Puar suggests that gendered discourses of nationalism often demonize or advocate the expulsion of Muslim people in the United States, thus tying particular understandings of the nation-state and nationalism to specific configurations of gender. Religion may also inform gender roles in particular locations, thus when nationalist projects are undertaken women and men may feel tension between the gender expectations of their religion and the gender expectations associated with nationalist discourse.

== Scholarly studies of nationalism and gender ==
Nationalism and gender studies is a subfield within the broader interdisciplinary study of nationalism, also referred to as nationalism studies. Nationalism and gender studies draw on feminism, queer theory, postcolonialism, and interdisciplinary methods to investigate the interplay between gender and nationalism. A shared evaluation among many scholars is that gender, sexuality, and nationalism are socially and culturally constructed. Scholars of gender and nationalism thus argue that gender configurations are always intimately related to and impact the development of nationalism. The development of nationalism and gender studies arose due to a lack study about the way gender and sexuality intersect with nationalism by mainstream scholars of nationalism. Feminist scholars were among the first theorists to approach the relationship between nationalism and gender and began writing of the relationship between gender, sexuality, and nationalism in the 1980s and 1990s. These early feminist studies of gender and nationalism focused primarily on the role of women in the development of nationalism. However, several scholars are now approaching multiple dimensions of gender and sexuality in relation to the development of nationalism.

Context and location are important for understanding how nationalism develops. Therefore, scholars often use case studies to explore how gender and nationalism are linked in specific contexts. Among other locations, case studies exploring gender and nationalism have analyzed situations in Canada, Argentina, India, South Africa, Israel, Russia, Ireland, and the United States. Due to the interplay between colonialism, migration, and nationalism, other theorists have paid specific attention to the interplay of gender and nationalism in postcolonial contexts and have explored the relationship between transnationalism and gender.

=== Related terms ===
==== Muscular nationalism ====
Muscular nationalism is a term developed by the political scientist Sikata Banerjee to describe the development of nationalism amidst tensions produced by gender binaries. Banerjee describes muscular nationalism as a form of nationalism that relies on a binary notion of gender with opposing conceptions of man versus woman. In such a situation, female activists and political actors contest a dualistic notion of nationalism, thus generating political, cultural, and social tension. The form of nationalism resulting from the binary and its contestation is muscular nationalism.

==== Queer nationalism ====
Within studies of nationalism, gender, and sexuality, queer nationalism refers the process wherein homosexuality and queer sexuality function as the basis of social and political organization and produce particular nationalisms. Queer nationalism can also refer to the process of using queerness as a metaphor for types of affiliations between nation-states.

==== Homonationalism ====
Scholars have used the term homonationalism to describe the emergence of nationalism that advances support for homosexuality and LGBT rights while also promoting xenophobic, racist, colonialist, and supremacist ideologies. Jasbir Puar, who first developed the term homonationalism, has argued that it describes a form of nationalism that assumes "sexual exceptionalism, queer as regulatory, and the ascendancy of whiteness."

==== Femonationalism ====
Developed by theorist Sara Farris, femonationalism describes a particular form of nationalism within western European contexts. Farris defines femonationalism as a form of nationalism that deploys feminist critique and support for gender equality while simultaneously promoting xenophobic, racist, and anti-Islam sentiment and policy.

==== Heteronationalism ====
Heteronationalism refers to the ideological articulation between nationalism and heteronormativity, through which heterosexuality and traditional sexual values are used as markers of belonging, cohesion, and national pride, as well as criteria of superiority over other nations, cultures, or social groups.
