= Women and migration =

Almost half of international migrants are women, generally travelling as either migrant workers or refugees. Women migrant workers migrate from developing countries to high-income countries to engage in paid employment, typically in gendered professions such as domestic work. Because their work disproportionately takes place in private homes, they are vulnerable to exploitation and abuse. Wages earned are largely sent home to the originating country to support the cost of living of the family left behind.

Refugee women face multiple challenges including limited access to healthcare, discrimination, sexual violence, and risks of human trafficking. Mental and physical health are often affected as a result.

== International migration ==
Almost half of international migrants are women, which is one of the most significant migrant-pattern changes in the last half century. Women migrate alone or with their family members and community. Even though female migration is largely viewed as associations rather than independent migration, emerging studies argue complex and manifold reasons for this.

== Migrant workers ==
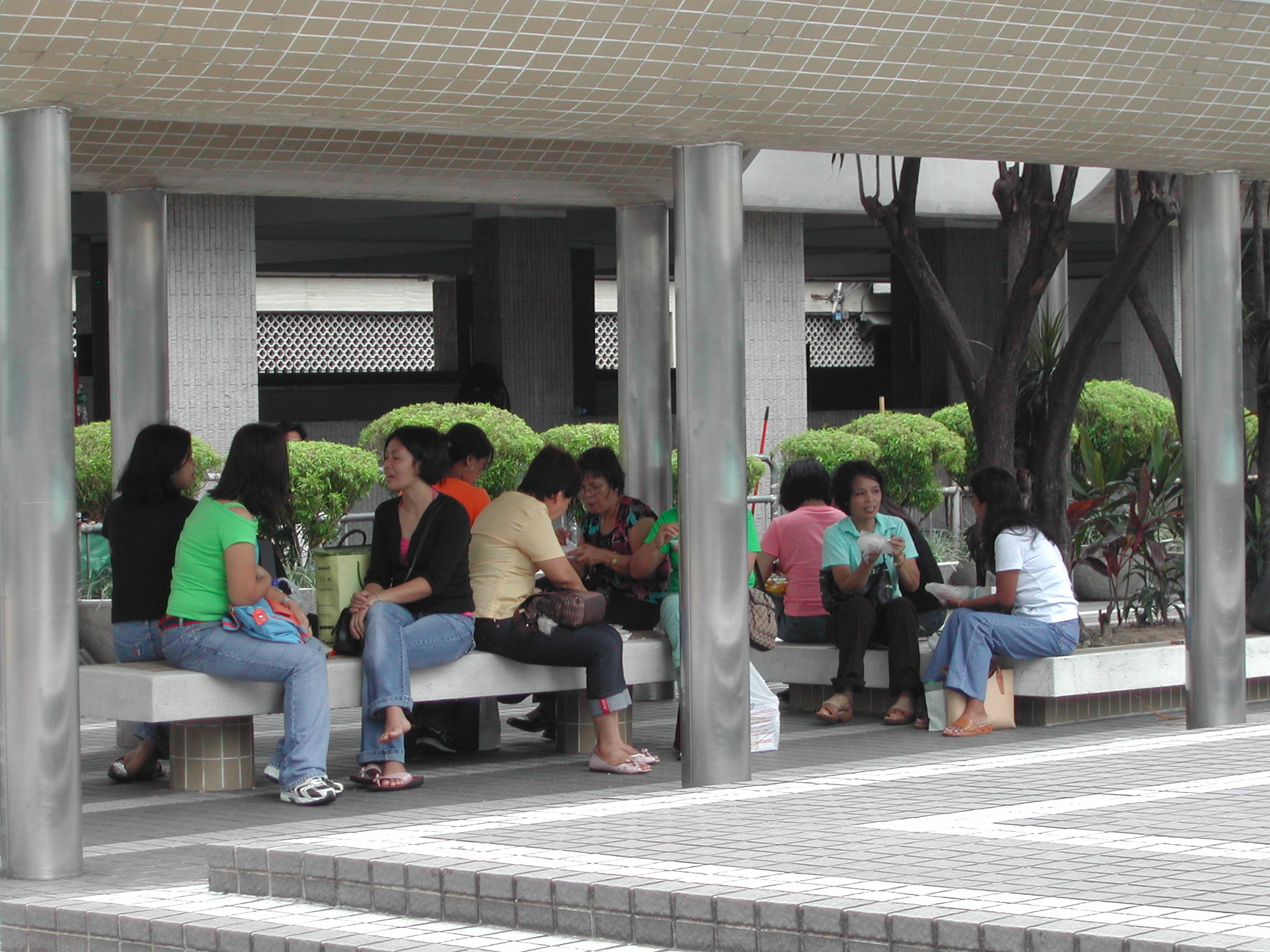
Filipina migrant workers in Hong Kong

Women migrant workers from developing countries engage in paid employment in countries where they are not citizens. While women have traditionally been considered companions to their husbands in the migratory process, most adult migrant women today are employed in their own right. In 2017, of the 168 million migrant workers, over 68 million were women. The increase in proportion of women migrant workers since the early twentieth century is often referred to as the "feminization of migration".

Most women workers immigrate from developing countries to high-income countries, with significant impacts on both their countries of origin and destination countries. Women migrant workers send upwards of $300 billion in remittances to their countries of origin each year, often using this money to pay for their families’ basic health, housing and education needs. On a macroeconomic level, remittances from emigrant workers can account for up to 25% of national gross domestic product, and help these developing countries cope with trade deficits and external debts. However, women migrant workers have to leave their countries of origin to provide financially, and are often separated from their own families. This has led to an uneven distribution of reproductive labor globally: in destination countries, immigrant women help address the care worker shortage, and enable more local women to enter the workforce. On the other hand, in countries of origin, the emigration of large numbers of women forces other members of the community to shoulder greater domestic work burdens.

Women migrant workers typically pursue gendered professions such as domestic work and disproportionately work in private homes. As a result, they are comparatively “hidden” from society and are more vulnerable to exploitation and abuse. A variety of governmental policies, moreover, have also increased the vulnerability of these women migrant workers to abuse. For example, in the Arab states, migrant domestic workers depend on their employers for legal status, causing the workers to tolerate a significant amount of abuse for fear of deportation. Several countries also prohibit women migrant workers from having sex or becoming pregnant.

In the United States, immigrant women are highly concentrated in low-wage care and service jobs, and their economic mobility is often limited by language barriers and the lack of recognition of foreign credentials. These conditions contribute to gendered labor inequalities that affect immigrant women differently than native-born women. Wage discrimination is when an employer pays different wages to two seemingly similar employees, usually on the basis of gender or race. Kampelmann and Rycx (2016) explain two different explanations for the differences observed in wages. They explain that employer tastes and preferences for foreign workers and/or customers can translate into having a lower demand for them as a whole and as a result offering them lower wages, as well as the differences in career dynamics, whereas, if there is large differences between immigrant workers and “native” workers, it could lead to wage discrimination for immigrant workers. Within the discrimination of domestic to foreign workers there is also discrimination among foreign workers based on gender. Female migrant workers are faced with a “triple-discrimination”. This "triple-discrimination" states that women foreign workers are more at risk to experience discrimination because they are women, unprotected workers, and migrant workers.

== Refugee women ==
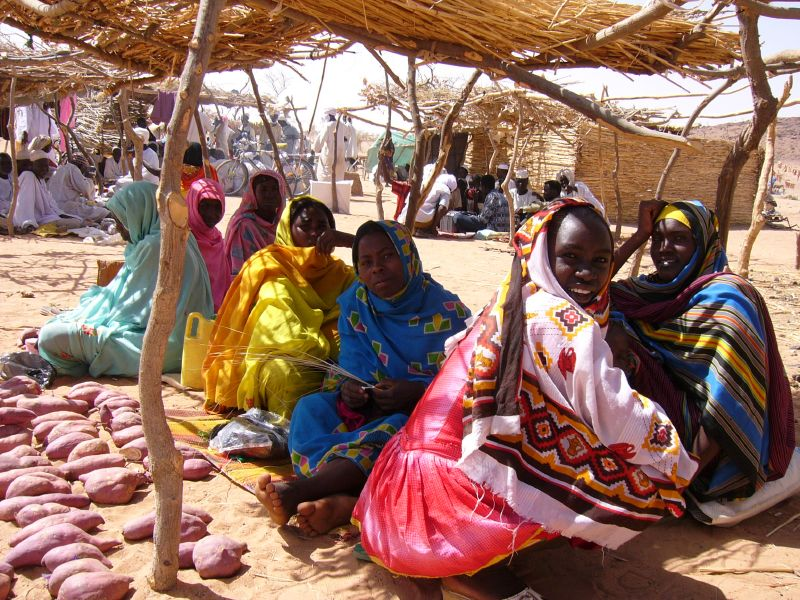
Refugee Women in Chad

Refugee women face gender-specific challenges in navigating daily life at every stage of their migration experience. Common challenges for all refugee women, regardless of other demographic data, are access to healthcare and physical abuse and instances of discrimination, sexual violence, and human trafficking are the most common ones. But even if women don't become victims of such actions, they often face abuse and disregard for their specific needs and experiences, which leads to complex consequences including demoralization, stigmatization, and mental and physical health decay. The lack of access to appropriate resources from international humanitarian aid organizations is compounded by the prevailing gender assumptions around the world, though recent shifts in gender mainstreaming are aiming to combat these commonalities.

== Migration to the United States ==
Currently, there are over 20 million immigrant women residing in the United States. The American Immigration Council states that the majority of these immigrant women come from Mexico, meaning that the main demographic of immigrant women in the U.S. are Latina. As the fastest growing minority group in America, Latinas are becoming primary influencers in education, economics and culture in American society and the consumer marketplace.

== Violence against women in anti-immigration rhetoric ==
Anti-immigration actors often deploy rhetoric about protecting women and girls from sexual violence by immigrants to advance exclusionary policy goals. The German campaign "120 Dezibel" leveraged migrant-led sexual assaults to promote xenophobic immigration policy under a feminist banner, and the UK-based "Pink Ladies" formed in 2025 after anti-immigration protests following the sexual assault of a 14-year-old girl by an asylum seeker. In France, the slogan "Ni voile, ni viol" ("neither veils nor rape") was previously used by anti-Islam campaigners and U.S. nativist groups similarly use allegations of sexual violence to justify border surveillance. This phenomenon, dubbed "femonationalism", uses gender equality alongside nationalism to depict migration and Islam as security threats.

== Sources ==
=== Books ===
- Knörr, Jacqueline. Women and Migration. Anthropological Perspectives, Frankfurt & New York: Campus Verlag & St. Martin's Press, 2000.
