= Sara R. Farris =

Italian sociologist

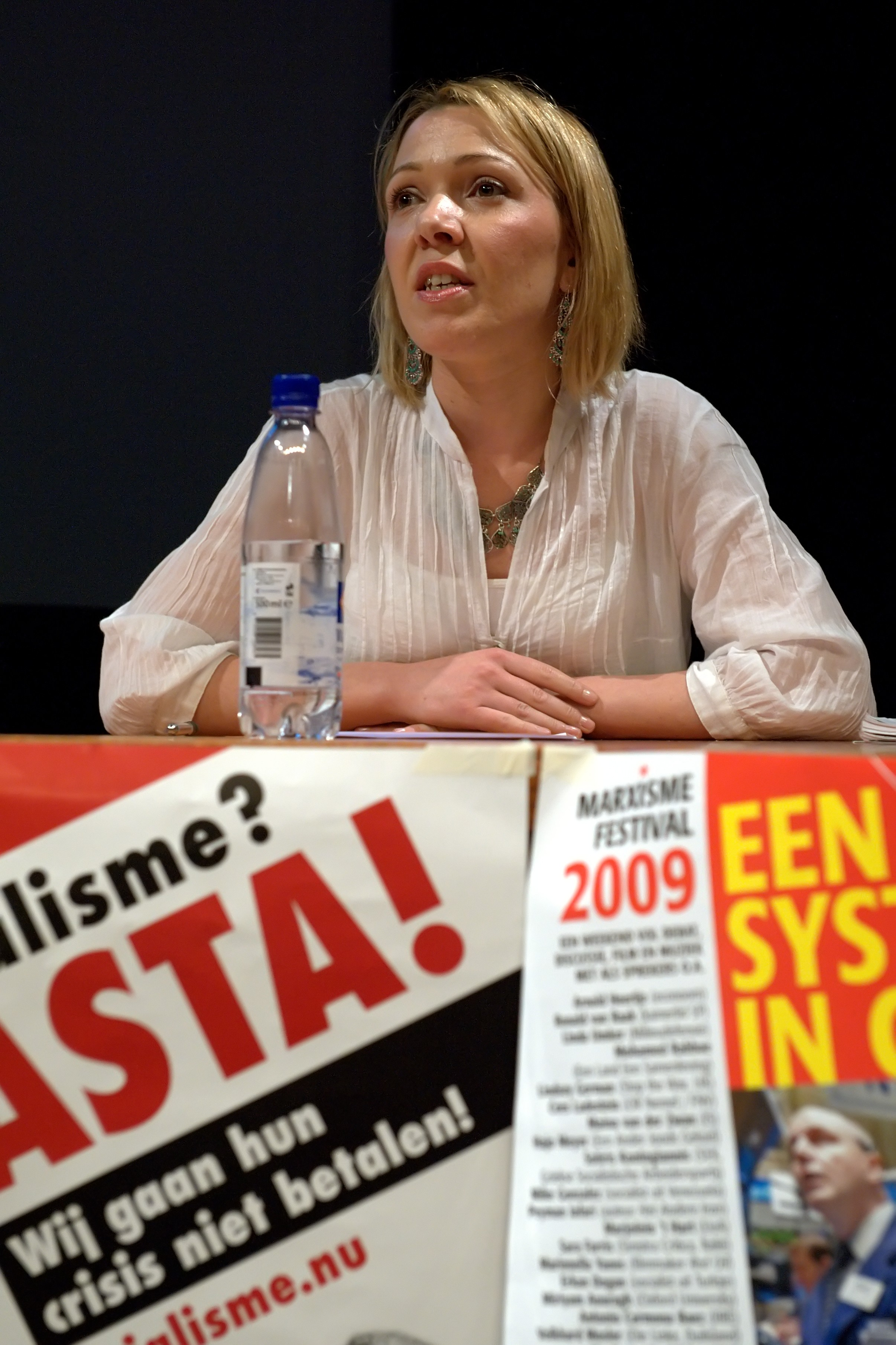
- Sara R. Farris

Academic background
- Education: Sapienza University of Rome (PhD)

Academic work
- Discipline: Sociology
- Institutions: Goldsmiths, University of London

Sara R. Farris is a British sociologist at Goldsmiths, University of London. She is known for coining the term femonationalism, the use of feminist ideas to further racist, xenophobic, and aporophobic positions. Farris co-directs the PhD Program in the Department of Sociology at Goldsmiths and is the Chair of the Anti-Racism committee.

== Works ==
=== Books ===
- Farris, Sara R. (2017). In the Name of Women's Rights: The Rise of Femonationalism. Durham and London: Duke University Press. ISBN 978-0-8223-6974-5
- Farris, Sara R. (2013). Max Weber's Theory of Personality: Individuation, Politics and Orientalism in the Sociology of Religion. Leiden: Brill. ISBN 978-90-04-25409-1

=== Academic articles ===
- Farris, Sara R. (November 20, 2012). "Femonationalism and the "Regular" Army of Labor Called Migrant Women". History of the Present. 2 (2): 184–199 doi:10.5406/historypresent.2.2.0184
- Farris, Sara R & Marchetti, Sabrina. (June 1, 2017). "From the Commodification to the Corporatization of Care: European Perspectives and Debates". Social Politics. 24 (2): 109–131 – via Oxford University Press. doi:10.1093/sp/jxx003
- Farris, Sara R. (February 2015). "Migrants' Regular Army of Labour: Gender Dimensions of the Impact of the Global Economic Crisis on Migrant Labor in Western Europe". The Sociological Review. 63 (1): 121–143 – via Sage Publications. doi:10.1111/1467-954X.12185

=== News articles ===
- Farris, Sara R. (December 19, 2022). "Giorgia Meloni Is a Female Face for an Anti-Feminist Agenda". Jacobin. Retrieved October 22, 2023.
- Farris, Sara R. (February 10, 2019). "#MeToo Shows Sexism is not Men of Colour's Prerogative". Al-Jazeera. Retrieved October 22, 2023.

== See also ==
- Purplewashing
- Purple capitalism
- Homonationalism
- Jasbir Puar
- Interest convergence
