= Homonationalism =

Sexual diversity as a symbol of national pride

Homonationalism is an academic term coined to describe the selective acceptance of LGBTQ+ people in order to promote a nationalist ideology. It describes a phenomenon in which some nations strategically show increased support for LGBTQ+ rights as a means of reinforcing racial, religious, and cultural hierarchies. The term explains how discourses of sexual inclusion and LGBTQ+ acceptance, particularly in Western contexts, are used to justify xenophobic, Islamophobic, or racist policies, often by portraying marginalized communities as inherently homophobic and Western nations as sexually progressive.

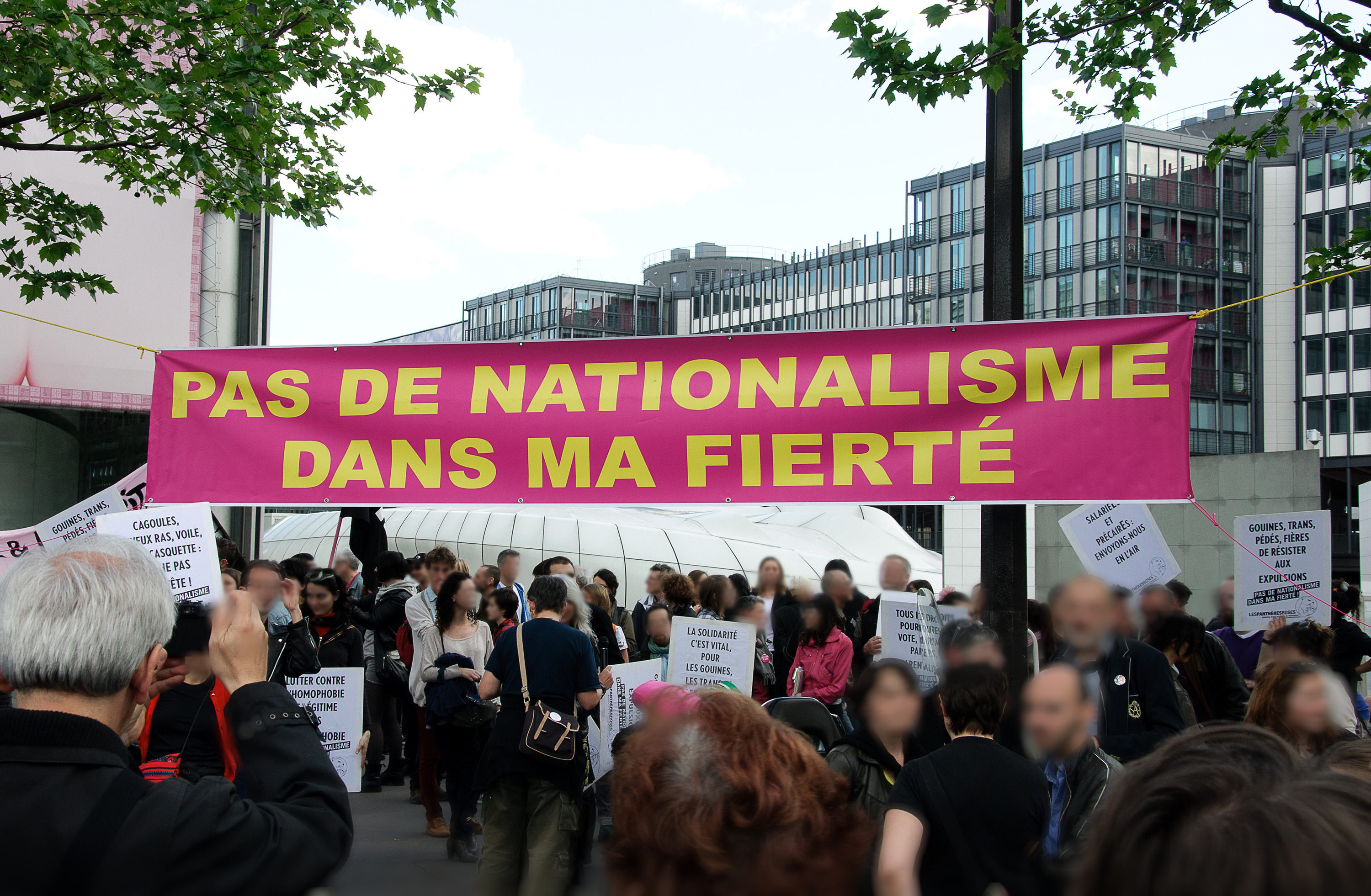
Demonstration against homonationalism during Labour Day 2012 in France by Les Panthères roses

== Theoretical context and development ==
The term "homonationalism" was coined by gender studies scholar Jasbir K. Puar in her 2007 book Terrorist Assemblages: Homonationalism in Queer Times. The term refers to how, in the context of Western modernity, liberal power structures co-opt certain LGBTQ+ rights discourses — typically centered on white, cisgender, citizen-identifying queer subjects — to construct a national identity that is portrayed as progressive and tolerant, while simultaneously justifying racist, xenophobic and aporophobic policies, particularly against Muslim communities. As a result, sexual diversity and LGBTQ+ rights are sometimes used to support political positions opposing immigration, a strategy that has become increasingly common among far-right parties.

Homonationalist narratives often rely on orientalist and homophobic stereotypes that depict immigrants, especially those from Muslim-majority countries, as inherently intolerant and regressive, thereby reinforcing notions of a morally superior Western society. By that, these portrayals can be used to legitimize exclusionary practices, such as increased border security, surveillance and anti-immigration legislation. Puar describes the association between sexual rights with such (homo)nationalist aims as "form of sexual exceptionalism [dependent on the] segregation and disqualification of racial and sexual others", a framework wherein only selected LGBTQ+ are incorporated into the national imaginary, while others are excluded or made invisible.

This dynamic has also been explored further by philosopher Judith Butler who in 2008 referred to it as a form of sexual politics. Butler argues that the promotion of progressive rights, such as same-sex marriage, is often used to cement national identity by contrastring liberal, secular, European norms with the perceived conservatism of migrant or Muslim populations.

The concept of homonationalism was developed to analyze and critique how LGBTQ+ movements have been incorporated into nationalist discourses, often alongside increasing anti-immigrant sentiment, while overlooking the continued presence of homophobia within Western societies. This critique includes how LGBTQ+ rights are frequently defined in terms of access to heteronormative institutions, e.g. military service and legal marriage while structural inequalities and ongoing homophobia within Western societies are often minimized. Claims of social equality in Western societies are often contrasted with countries that criminalize homosexuality or do not legally recognize same-sex marriages, particularly Muslim-majority nations, with such comparisons frequently used to reinforce civilizational hierarchies.

In her 2013 article, "Rethinking Homonationalism", Puar emphasizes that the concept should not be reduced to a critique of individual political actors, policies or solely as a description of "bad politics". Rather, she presents homonationalism not as an isolated phenomenon, but as a feature of modernity, embedded within broader systems of neoliberal governance, security frameworks, and (global) capitalism, aligned with dominant Western societal constructions to uphold existing power structures.

== Related concepts ==
=== Pinkwashing, also known as rainbow-washing ===
The term Pinkwashing, also known as rainbow-washing, emerged informally in the United States in 2010 and refers to the co-option of LGBTQ-friendly messaging by states, corporations, or other institutions to present themselves as progressive while deflecting criticism of their other policies or practices such as human rights abuses. The term is used in discussions about Israel's public diplomacy, alleging that Israel uses its support for LGBTQ+ rights to deflect criticism of its treatment of Palestinians. Academics such as Maya Mikdashi and Sarah Schulman argue that such representations frame Israel as a beacon of LGBTQ+ inclusivity, while portraying Palestinian Arab and/or Muslim societies as inherently homophobic, reinforcing orientalist and Islamophobic assumptions.

=== Femonationalism ===
The concept of femonationalism, introduced by sociologist Sara R. Farris in 2012, describes how nationalist ideologies and neoliberal policies align with certain feminist discourses to justify anti-immigrant and Islamophobic agendas. Like homonationalism, femonationalism instrumentalizes progressive ideals, in this case women's rights, to portray Muslim men or societies as inherently patriarchal and Western societies as fundamentally egalitarian. This logic can be mobilzed to legitimize restrictive immigration policies and sustain a narrative of Western moral superiority under the guise of aiming for progressive gender equality.

== Political applications ==
=== National identity ===
National identity narratives have been found to be influenced by homonationalism, especially in Western democracies where the advancement of LGBTQ+ rights is frequently linked to ideals of modernity, progress, and tolerance. These rights are occasionally juxtaposed with representations of immigrant, Muslim, or African communities as homophobic or patriarchal, often reinforcing national narratives that marginalize Indigenous and racialized communities even as the state celebrates LGBTQ+ inclusion. This contrast is seen as reinforcing hierarchies by portraying Western societies as sexually progressive. In this context, LGBTQ+ inclusion may function as a symbolic indicator of national belonging, while racialized or immigrant populations are positioned as others the normative boundaries of the nation. Some scholars also argue that homonationalism selectively integrates LGBTQ+ subjects into images of national belonging to project progressiveness and modernity, including via tourism or mega-sports event branding. For example, at the 2010 Vancouver Winter Olympics, "Pride Houses" promoted a narrative of Canadian inclusivity while the Games nonetheless occurred on unceded Indigenous land and amid protests from certain Indigenous groups, showing how queer visibility can be tied to settler-colonial governance or city marketing. In such contexts, scholars suggest that LGBTQ+ inclusive branding and marketing can "perform" national progress as an act to give off the "progressive" national image, even as Indigenous, racialized, and migrant communities still face stark unequalities and lack recognition.

=== Anti-immigration and security ===
In Europe and North America, rightwing and populist parties have been using homonationalist language more and more to portray immigration as a danger to LGBTQ+ safety and gender rights. This framing has been found to resonate not only with conservative constituencies but also with segments of liberal and centrist voters. A study by sociologist Christopher A. Bail found that civil society organizations in the United States were more successful in influencing media and public discourse when they framed opposition to Muslim immigration in terms of protecting liberal values such as gender equality and LGBTQ+ rights, rather than relying on overtly nationalist or religious rhetoric. In this context, LGBTQ+ rights are used not for emancipatory reasons, but as a political tool to justify exclusionary border regimes and surveillance. This aligns with Michel Foucault's concept of Biopower, whereby state control is exercised through the regulation of bodies and populations, often in the name of protecting national values.

A study on Populist Radical Right (PRR) parties in 2021 Western Europe found that despite the increasing number of homonationalist ideas, voters who either identified as queer or expressed support for the LGBTQ+ rights did not necessarily align electorally with the PRR parties. Instead, many supported mainstream parties such as the Dutch VVD, which took a more moderate stance on immigration. However, alignment between homonationalist rhetoric and voting behavior was observed in Austria, Norway, Sweden, and Switzerland. The study did note that such narratives where absent in PRR parties in Central and Eastern Europe, where blatant homophobic political discourse remain mainstream.

An experimental study found that individuals exposed to anti-LGBTQ+ protest were significantly more likely to express support for LGBTQ+ plus rights when protesters were stereotypical depicted as Muslims, compared to when the protesters were presented as white people. Suggesting, that support for LGBTQ+ rights can be influenced by racial and religious framing.

=== Framing terrorism ===
In Terrorist Assemblages, Jasbir Puar argues that queerness is deployed within post-9/11 counterterrorism narratives in the United States and other Western contexts. Some queer people, especially white, cisgender and nationally assimilated people, are praised as modern, patriotic citizens, representative of liberal democracy. On the other hand, Muslim and racialized bodies, queer or not, are portrayed as abnormal, backward, or pro-terrorist. She writes that "sexual deviance is linked to the process of discerning, othering, and quarantining terrorist bodies, but these racially and sexually perverse figures also labor in the service of disciplining and normalizing subjects worthy of rehabilitation away from these bodies, in other words, signaling and enforcing the mandatory terms of patriotism". According to Puar, the binary logic of inclusion and exclusion, which is produced through both the securitization of Muslim bodies during the war on terror and the marginalization of queer bodies, has led to the conditional inclusion of certain LGBTQ+ individuals into the "U.S. national citizenship within a spatial-temporal domain" a process which she refers to as homonationalism, "short for 'homonormative nationalism.'"

Abu Ghraib was a U.S. military prison in Iraq which was closed following citations of human rights violations committed against the detained. Pictures of some of the violations were sent to CBS news, creating a nationwide scandal in 2004. The photos taken depict sexual abuse, rape, and torture of the detainees. Much of the sexual abuse taking place simulated homosexual acts in a "culturally specific [...] matrix of torture". The inclusion of homosexuality into an American national identity, homonationalism, was specifically employed in Abu Ghraib to torture and sexually and racially other the detainees. According to Puar, during this scandal, queer liberal news medias continued to other Muslim sexuality and identity.

Gaetano Venezia III argues homonationalist narratives were demonstrated in response to the Pulse nightclub shooting in Orlando, Florida in 2016 which was the deadliest mass shooting in American history until the Las Vegas shooting the following year. Venezia argues this disregards historical shootings with more victims, "'...including race riots and labor disputes in the early 1900s and massacres perpetrated by the U.S. Army or settlers in the American West.' Thus, describing the Pulse shooting as the worst mass shooting obscures state violence, protects the image of the state, and minimizes or erases the oppression of indigenous people and racial minorities." Venezia argues that the responses to the Pulse shooting strengthen and protect not only the image of the state but its officials. "Police and politicians often get good press by expressing their sympathy and solidarity with the LGBTQ+ community, even as they remain unapologetic and unresponsive in regards to oppressive policies and actions, like the Stonewall riots, abuse of trans folk, and restrictions on LGBTQ+ rights and protections."

== International case studies ==
=== Americas ===
==== The United States ====
After 9/11, U.S. national security discourse began using LGBTQ+ rights, especially those of white, cisgender, assimilated individuals, to symbolize modernity and reinforce patriotic belonging, as Puar argues in Terrorist Assemblages.

The 2010 repeal of "Don’t Ask, Don’t Tell" was seen as progress for LGBTQ+ rights. However, scholars argue that this inclusion also served to align LGBTQ+ identities with nationalistic and militaristic agendas, potentially marginalizing those who do not conform to normative standards. While the repeal allowed gays and lesbians to serve openly in the U.S. military, scholars like Margot Canaday argue that this inclusion was framed within the context of military effectiveness, national security, and unit cohesion, which reflect normative and nationalistic standards.

The 2016 Pulse nightclub shooting was widely framed as an attack by a racialized Muslim outsider on American values. Gaetano Venezia argues this framing allowed U.S. officials to present the state as protector of LGBTQ+ citizens while diverting attention from systemic racism, gun violence, and domestic homophobia, reflecting dynamics of homonationalism that reinforce state power and obscure social inequalities.

Homonationalism can also be found in U.S. foreign policy. In 2011, Secretary of State Hillary Clinton declared that “gay rights are human rights” in a speech to the United Nations in Geneva. While widely praised, scholars such as Cynthia Weber argue that this rhetoric positioned the U.S. as a moral authority, reinforcing Western superiority and using LGBTQ+ rights to justify interventionist policies, thus exemplifying homonationalist dynamics.

=== Asia ===
==== India ====
The rise of the Hindu Nationalism and the Bharatiya Janata Party has also seen some members of the LGBT community in India allying with Hindutva, while furthering tropes of Islamophobia and casteist rhetoric. Specifically, the allyship with the Hindutva movement leads to upper-caste queers having freedom of expression and the right to exist while queers who are of lower-caste and Muslim to lack these rights and freedoms. These individuals are further oppressed by the same upper-caste queers through the Hindu nationalist movement. This has also been seen in attempts to justify policy changes such as the revocation of Article 370 in Jammu and Kashmir. In 2019 an event at SOAS, London was disrupted by masked individuals wearing balaclavas and carrying a rainbow flag that said “Gay for J&K”, “Article 370 is homophobic”, and “Regressive Left, don’t betray us". In 2023, the Indian Government's Ministry of Social Justice appointed scholar Giti Thadani to the National Council for Transgender Persons amidst allegations of Islamophobic tweets and hate speech.

A top leader of the Rashtriya Swayamsevak Sangh, a Hindu Nationalist paramilitary organisation, had also come out in support of the LGBT community while the Supreme Court of India was hearing petitions to legalise same-sex marriage stating that "Hindu society does not see the transgender community as a problem" and that LGBTQ people "should have their own private and social space". Abhijit Iyer-Mitra, a petitioner in the Supreme Court case to legalise same-sex marriage, has also been described by Al Jazeera as a 'Hindutva Ideologue' when he met with U.S. Democratic Congressman Ro Khanna. The Indian-American Muslim Council issued a statement saying it was “deeply disappointed to see Khanna engaging with a far-right Islamophobe”, and condemned him for embracing those who “enable [this] cycle of hate and violence” against Muslims.

==== Israel ====
In a 2011 article, Sarah Schulman argues that the Israeli government, as part of a marketing campaign to depict Israel as "relevant and modern", although critics note this framing often obscures the experiences of queer Palestinians living under occupation, "harness[ed] the gay community to reposition its global image." Schulman writes that anti-occupation LGBT activists have labeled these strategies as pinkwashing: "a deliberate strategy to conceal the continuing violations of Palestinians' human rights behind an image of modernity signified by Israeli gay life."

Also writing in 2011, Maya Mikdashi states, "Today, the promise of 'gay rights' for Palestinian[s] goes something like this: The United States will protect your right to not be detained because [you are] gay, but will not protect you from being detained because you are Palestinian." Mikdashi argues that pinkwashing is not about the toleration of queer bodies and identities, but is instead a political strategy within a discourse of Islamophobia and Arabophobia, and it is part of a larger project to anchor all politics within the axis of identity, and identitarian (and identifiable) groups. Thus, critics of pinkwashing who assume an international queer camaraderie repeat a central tenet of homonationalism: homosexuals should be in solidarity with and empathize with each other because they are homosexual. Mikdashi warns this framing masks structural violence and reinforces settler-colonial narratives under the guise of LGBTQ+ rights advocacy.

Pinkwashing tactics are described as the whitewashing of racial and religious oppression while claiming to support and enact modern gay rights solely for the representative image of modernity and liberalism. Though Puar describes pinkwashing mostly within the context of Israel, other Western societies including the United States and Canada enact pinkwashing tactics to promote tourism, keep healthy trade and communication lines with other liberal governments, and feign the idea liberalism and democracy.

A notable example occurred in November 2023, during Israels military operations in Gaza, when the official Israeli state Twitter account (@Israel) as well as the official Israel state Instagram account posted an image of an IDF soldier holding a pride flag in a war-torn urban environment with the caption “In the name of love.” Together with the accompanying tweet stating: "The first ever pride flag raised in Gaza, Yoav Atzmoni who is a member of the LGBTQ+ community wanted to send a message of hope to the people of Gaza living under Hamas brutality. His intention was to raise the first pride flag in Gaza as a call for peace and freedom".

=== Europe ===
==== France ====
France has used the rhetoric of secularism and gender equality to target Muslim populations, particularly around the headscarf debate and same-sex marriage. Scholars argue that the French state selectively invokes gender and sexual equality, particularly in the context of laïcité to frame Islam, and its customs such as wearing the hijab or nikab as incompatible with “Republican values"

==== Ukraine ====
During the Russian invasion of Ukraine, members of the LGBT community in Ukraine who support their government's war effort feared setbacks in the progress made since Euromaidan. Political scientist Emil Edenborg invoked the concept of homonationalism in Ukraine and the West as a counterpart to a Russian nationalism centered on traditional values, writing that "Russia's geopoliticization of gender is mirrored by homonationalist and femonationalist discourses in the West, when gay rights and gender equality are portrayed as evidence of 'our' national superiority vis-à-vis backward Others, whether Muslim immigrants or homophobic Russians."

== Criticism and debate ==
The term homonationalism by Jasbir Puar has been both influential and contested. Bruno Perreau has critiqued Puar for potentially idealizing the "sexually nonnormative racialized subject", arguing that the deconstruction of norms often reproduces the very norms it seeks to critique. Thereby, Perreau explains that "deconstruction of norms cannot be dissociated from their reproduction".

Further, Jason Ritchie has raised concerns about the overextension of the concept, especially as it is often used as a totalizing theory particularly in its deployment within discussions of Israel and Palestine. He critiques queer theory's potential detachment from "the politics of the ordinary" warning that homonationalism, when used uncritically, leaves no room for the complexity of queer experiences, especially of those in the local area or conflict zones.

Rahul Rao highlights the risk of blindly transplanting homonationalism to the Global South, where queer politics may function according to distinct political and historical logics. He cautions that such uses run the risk of repeating Western theoretical domination and erasing local agency.

Intersectional and decolonial scholars have emphasized the need to integrate analyses of race, class and settler colonialism into critiques of homonationalism. These scholars argue that queer subjects of color are often simultaneously included and excluded through neoliberal multiculturalism and securitization, a dynamic that is called "queer necropolitics".

Together, these critiques call for a more grounded and context-sensitive queer politics, one that is not grounded in nationalist, securitized, or neoliberal agendas.

== See also ==
- Heteronationalism – Heterosexuality as a symbol of national pride
- Ethnocentrism – Judging another culture by the values and standards of one's own culture
- Gay friendly
- Homonormativity – Application of heterosexual norms to LGBTQ culture
- LGBTQ conservatism
- LGBTQ people and Islam
- Model minority myth
- Nationalism and gender
- National Socialist League (United States)
- Pink capitalism
- Pink money
- Pink triangle
- Purplewashing – Use of feminist aesthetics to promote organisations
- Regressive left – Pejorative term for overly tolerant left-wing politics
