= Heteropatriarchy =

Social system in which maleness and heterosexuality are privileged

In feminist theory, heteropatriarchy (etymologically from heterosexual and patriarchy) or cisheteropatriarchy, is a social construct where (primarily) cisgender (same gender as identified at birth) and heterosexual men have authority over other cisgender men, women, and people with other sexual orientations and gender identities. It is a term that emphasizes that discrimination against women and LGBT people is derived from the same sexist social principle.

The concept postulates that in heteropatriarchal societies, cisgender heterosexual men generally occupy the highest positions of power in society, causing women (including transgender women), non-binary people, transgender men, and other LGBT people to experience the bulk of social oppression in relation to gender and sexuality.

== Theory ==
The theory of the concept asserts that, as a social system, heteropatriarchy perceives heterosexuality and patriarchy as normal while other configurations are considered abnormal. Normalization of heteropatriarchy is said to perpetuate an environment of oppression and inequality for racial and sexual minority groups.

Heteropatriarchy is a facet of popular feminist analysis used to explain modern hierarchical social structure, which is dependent upon, and includes, the perspective of gender roles, based on a system of interlocking forces of power and oppression. It is said to be commonly understood, in this context, that men typically occupy the highest positions of power and women experience the bulk of social oppression.

This system of socio-political dominance is said to be reinforced by gender norms, which ascribe traits of femininity and masculinity to people, whereby cisgender heterosexual men are favored and are routinely remunerated for presenting masculine traits, and conversely, women and people who display traits deemed feminine receive less societal privilege. The concept implies that historically this has manifested in economic disadvantages such as unequal pay, or the inability for women to own land.

The practice of legal (and social) culture of relegating gender to the realm of "women's issues" and sexual orientation to the realm of "sexual minorities' issues” is fundamental to this concept of a heteropatriarchal society. It implies further, that not only are heterosexual men given primacy over other gender and sexual minorities, but they also are encouraged and rewarded by a heteropatriarchal society, and that on the microscopic level, heteropatriarchy could be evident in consumption habits and relationships while on the macroscopic level, it is demonstrated by the glass ceiling, marriage, and the legal control over the bodies of women.

From a historical point of view, the term patriarchy refers to the father as the power holder inside family hierarchy, and thereby, women become subordinate to the power of men. Patriarchy is a social system in which men have predominant power and are dominant and have privilege in roles such as: political, economical, societal, and social roles. With the emergence of queer theory around the 1980s and the 1990s and the questioning of heteronormativity and gender binary in contemporary societies, this kind of domination was described not only in terms of gender (the predominance of men over woman, or the masculine over the feminine) or sex, but also in terms of sexuality (the heteronormativity, or heterosexuality above other sexual orientations and the cisgender over other identities). The term heteropatriarchy is said to have evolved from what is described as the previous, less specific term 'patriarchy' in order to emphasize the formation of a male-dominated society based upon the cultural processes of sexism or heterosexism.

== Background history ==
The concept presumes that since ancient times, heteropatriarchy has shaped the way societies across the world have viewed masculinity and femininity and that this societal system has had negative effects on societies that remain apparent in modern days.

Research by Evelyn Nakano Glenn postulates that Ancient China is an example that confirms this, being a society having male emperors with dominant power, in which women and people who showed feminine traits were objectified and oppressed. Exceptions to the premise not being addressed, women were seen as obedient housewives whose main purpose was to serve men. The conclusion seems to be that due to this, the voices of women have been ignored and suppressed, leading to a system that grew into a society denying women rights and that they were dehumanized.

Some contemporary research postulates that while there is no definitive origin for heteropatriarchy, various places and societies may have contributed significantly to its creation. The classical period of ancient Greek society is identified as one of these contributory factors. Records that show that the ancient Greek system used gender and sex as the very foundation of human identity and the very basis of social organization. The concept asserts that these Greeks had a critical role in the institutionalization of patriarchy in the Western world and also had an impact on Roman imperialism that furthered their gender/sex ideas into modern arrangements. Recently, some of these scholars have begun to document the critical role of these Greeks in the institutionalization of patriarchy in the Western World. Synthesizing the work of such scholars is thought to demonstrate how the Greek gender/sex system, as mediated through Roman imperialism, gave rise to the gender/sex conceptions that birthed contemporary arrangements.

In a premise where heteropatriarchy is established in a domestic arrangement, heteropaternalism is identified as another cause that has led to heteropatriarchy, meaning that the father of a house is the leader and center power of a family household, and is in charge of any social arrangements. Even though heteropatriarchy and heteropaternalism mainly define the perspective of patriarchy that makes up a mindset about gender wherein men are seen as strong and capable while women are perceived as weak and less capable, the concept asserts that this ideology has been promoted through colonization and spreading of Eurocentric culture, reaching hegemony around the world and removing other gender systems as well as other ways of understanding society, gender, or eroticism.

== Relevance ==
Some researchers in this field of study cite one of the main foundations of heteropatriarchy as the normalization of the nuclear family as the only acceptable family unit, manifesting this societal system into modern day, which they postulate has regulated the bodies of Indigenous women, queer, and trans people and sets out to destroy, control, and manipulate these differences into hierarchies. The effects of heteropatriarchy are said to have disproportionately affected minority groups, indigenous people, and the LGBT community.

== See also ==
- Androcentrism
- Cishomonormativity
- Gender role
- Hegemonic masculinity
- Heterosexism
- Heteronationalism
- Homophobia
- Intersectionality
- Machismo
- Masculism
- Pink capitalism
- Queer theory
- Sexism
- Transfeminism
