= Manuel Tzoc =

Guatemalan writer (born 1982)

Manuel Gabriel Tzoc Bucup (born 1982) is a Guatemalan poet. He is part of a group of local authors who began addressing sexual diversity in their writing from the early XXI century, and which also includes figures such as Numa Dávila, Fabricio Quemé, and Rebeca Lane.

== Career ==
He studied arts at the National School of Visual Arts and language and literature at the University of San Carlos of Guatemala. He also holds a diploma in Contemporary Art.

He began his literary career in 2006 with the publication of his first book, the poetry collection Esco-p(0)etas para una muerte en versos b…ala, which was also the first work of Ediciones Bizarras to have sexual diversity as its central theme. His next works were the poetry books De textos insanos (2009) and Gay(o) (2010), the latter considered a homo-porn text.

In 2015, Tzoc co-founded the publishing house La Maleta Ilegal with Chilean writer Rodrigo Arenas Carter, focused on producing dissident literature. In addition to Tzoc's own texts, the publisher released LGBT-themed works by authors such as Arenas Carter and Fabrizio Quemé. Tzoc also collaborated on the creation of LGBT cultural projects such as the fanzine La Macha, alongside Quemé, and Cuirpoétikas, together with Numa Dávila.

He has also ventured into theater, with poetic pieces such as El jardín de los infantes locos and La escafandra de oro, premiered in 2013. In 2017, his theatrical poem "Atómica" was selected as one of the finalists for the Artistic Research and Creation Grant of the Yaxs Foundation.

== Works ==
Among Tzoc's works are:

- Esco-p(0)etas para una muerte en versos b…ala (2006)
- De textos insanos (2009)
- Gay(o) (2010)
- El ebrio mar y yo (2011)
- Polen (2014)
- Cuerpo de niño triste (2015)
- Constante huida (2016)

== See also ==
- LGBT literature
