= Heterosexualism =

Heterosexualism may refer to:

- Heterosexism, a system of attitudes, bias, and discrimination in favor of opposite-sex sexuality and relationships
- Heterosexuality, romantic attraction, sexual attraction or sexual behavior between persons of the opposite sex or gender
