= Femonationalism =

Association between nationalism and some feminist ideas with xenophobic motivations

Femonationalism, sometimes known as feminationalism, is the association between a nationalist ideology and some feminist ideas when driven by xenophobic motivations, including in the context of Islamophobia. Femonationalism is short for "feminist and femocratic nationalism".

== History ==
The term was originally proposed by the researcher Sara R. Farris. Farris first wrote of Femonationalism in her 2012 article, Femonationalism and the “Regular” Army of Labor Called Migrant Women, then again in her book In the Name of Women's Rights: The Rise of Femonationalism. Femonationalism is used to refer to the usage of feminist ideas in order to justify islamophobic, aporophobic, racist, and xenophobic positions, arguing that immigrants are sexist and that Western society is entirely egalitarian. The term was developed following the September 11 attacks, as stereotypes and concerns over Arab/Islamic people rose that governments sought to address.

Anti-immigration actors often deploy rhetoric about protecting women and girls from sexual violence by immigrants to advance exclusionary policy goals. The German campaign "120 Dezibel" leveraged migrant-led sexual assaults to promote xenophobic immigration policy under a feminist banner, and the UK-based "Pink Ladies" formed in 2025 after anti-immigration protests following the sexual assault of a 14-year-old girl by an asylum seeker. In France, the slogan "Ni voile, ni viol" ("neither veils nor rape") was previously used by anti-Islam campaigners and U.S. nativist groups similarly use allegations of sexual violence to justify border surveillance.

== Critiques ==
The main critiques of this phenomenon focus on the partial and sectarian use of the feminist movement to further ends based on social intolerance, ignoring the sexism and lack of real social equality in Western society as a whole. An example of this would be political endorsement of anti-muslim policies by feminists. Also, Sara Farris critiques that money is taken from state programs for gender inequality and given to programs for women in minority groups that lead them to work in social reproduction jobs such as cleaning and providing childcare. Social reproduction jobs such as these were a point of contention in Second-wave feminism in the US. Farris also states that Femonationalist public figures contribute to the painting of Islam as misogynistic.

== See also ==
- Embedded feminism
- Ethnocentrism
- Feminism and racism
- Gendered Islamophobia
- Heteronationalism
- Homonationalism
- Islamophobia
- Imperial feminism
- Nationalism and gender
- Pinkwashing (LGBT)
- Purple capitalism
- Purplewashing
- TERF
- White feminism
- Xenophobia
- Criticism of Islam
- Collectif Némésis
