= My Father the Genius =

My Father the Genius is a 2002 documentary film directed by Lucia Small.

== Synopsis ==
When long-estranged father, dreamer and visionary architect, Glen Small bequeaths his daughter the task of writing his biography, she answers instead with a film about his career and rocky private life - while he is still alive. My Father, The Genius explores the precarious framework on which a career and family are built. How does a man dedicate his entire life to "saving the world through architecture," yet miss some basics at home? How does one balance creative obsession with familial obligations?
