= Homonormativity =

Application of heterosexual norms to LGBTQ culture

Homonormativity is the adoption of heteronormative ideals and constructs onto LGBTQ culture and identity. It is predicated on the assumption that the norms and values of heterosexuality should be replicated and performed among homosexual people. Those who assert this theory claim homonormativity selectively privileges cisgender homosexuality (that is coupled and monogamous) as worthy of social acceptance.

== Origin ==
The term "homonormativity" was popularized by Lisa Duggan in her 2003 critique of contemporary democracy, equality, and LGBTQ discourse. Duggan draws from heteronormativity, popularized by Michael Warner in 1991, and concepts rooted in Gayle Rubin's notion of the "sex/gender system" and Adrienne Rich's notion of compulsory heterosexuality.

Duggan writes, "homonormativity is a politics that does not contest dominant heteronormativity assumptions and institutions but upholds and sustains them while promising the possibility of a demobilised gay culture anchored in domesticity and consumption." Catherine Connell says homonormativity "emphasises commonality with the norms of heterosexual culture, including marriage, monogamy, procreation, and productivity." Queer theorist David M. Halperin sees the values of heteronormativity replicated and privileged as LGBTQ visibility and civil rights become normalized, writing "the keynote of gay politics ceases to be resistance to heterosexual oppression and becomes, instead, assimilation...the drive to social acceptance and integration into society as a whole."

Halperin says that the urbanization, gentrification and recapitalization of inner city queer areas and gay-ghettos contribute to the prevalence and privileging of established heterosexual norms. Halperin has linked the HIV/AIDS epidemic and the advent of online dating as contributing to the displacement of LGBTQ people. He also attributes the shift in political rhetoric, discourse, and attitude from liberation to assimilation as a further reinforcement of a homonormative binary.

Gayle Rubin's notion of "sex hierarchy" – that sees Western heteronormative society graduate sexual practices from morally "good sex" to "bad sex" – delineates the forms of homosexual behaviour that engenders conditional acceptance. She writes, "Stable, long-term lesbian and gay male couples are verging on respectability [...] if it is coupled and monogamous, the society is beginning to recognize that it includes the full range of human interaction." Rubin writes that these poles of acceptability and deviancy see a homonormative privileging of long-term gay couples over the bodies of transgender, non-binary, and promiscuous members of these groups, and that "Individuals whose behaviour stands high in this hierarchy are regarded with certified mental health, respectability, legality, social and physical mobility, institutional support and material benefits."

== Discrimination ==
Homonormative discrimination is deployed similarly to heteronormativity. Social institutions and policies reinforce the presumption that people are heterosexual and that gender and sex are natural binaries. However, Rubin writes that homonormativity functions to displace the exclusive hold heterosexuality has over normative behavior, instead selectively privileging cisgendered homosexuality (that is coupled and monogamous) as worthy of social acceptance.

=== Transgender people ===
Among transgender people, Gerdes argues that homonormativity functions to selectively relegate identities and behaviors into sanctioned acts and ideals. Rubin states that the replication of heterosexual norms – monogamy, white-privilege, gender binary – contribute to the stigmatization and marginalization of perceived deviant forms of sexuality and gender. In the 1990s, transgender activists deployed the term "homonormative" in reference to intracommunity discrimination that saw an imposition of gay and lesbian norms over the concerns of transgender people. During the AIDS epidemic in the United States, transgender people were often excluded from the gay and lesbian demonstrations held in the capitol and denied access to the healthcare initiatives and programs established to combat the crisis.

Transgender activist Sylvia Rivera spoke of her experiences campaigning for gay and trans liberation in the 70s and 80s, only to be stonewalled and ignored by those same people once their needs were met. In a 1989 interview she said:

And the gay rights bill, as far as I'm concerned, you know, to me, the gay rights bill and the people that I worked with on the gay rights bill and when I did all the petitioning and whatnot, when the bill was passed... That bill was mine as far as I'm concerned. I helped word it and I worked very hard for it. And that's why I get upset when I give interviews and whatever, because the fucking community has no respect for the people that really did it. Drag queens did it. We did it, we did it for our own brothers and sisters. But, damn it, don't keep shoving us in the fuckin' back and stabbing us in the back and that's... And that's what really hurts. And it is very upsetting [...] And when we asked the community to help us, there was nobody to help us. We were nothing. We were nothing!

— Eric Marcus, Making Gay History: Interview with Sylvia Rivera, December 9th, 1989

Holly Lewis states that continued pressure for non-normative individuals "to conform to traditional, oppositional sexist understandings of gender" has resulted in homonormativity permeating the behaviors and identities of the LGBTQ community, while replacing the radical past politics of the Gay Liberation Movement with goals of marriage equality and adoption. These are seen as conservative when framed against 70s/80s/90s LGBTQ activism. Homonormativity is perceived to stymie diversity and authenticity, with queer subcultures becoming commercialized and mainstreamed and political discourses structured around assimilation and normalization.

This aspect of homonormativity has been called transnormativity. Evan Vipond describes transnormativity as "the normalization of trans bodies and identities through the adoption of cisgender institutions by trans persons," such that transgender identity upholds the sex and gender binary. Transnormativity encompasses transmedicalism, basing transgender identity on the medicalized transition from one side of the gender binary to the other, de-legitimizing non-binary identity and transgender people without gender dysphoria.

== Politics ==
Politics and International Relations Lecturer at the University of New South Wales Penny Griffin says that politically homonormativity has been found to uphold, rather than critiquing, neoliberal values of monogamy, procreation and binary gender roles as inherently heterosexist and racist. Griffin sees homonormative behavior intertwined with capitalistic world systems, with consumer culture and materialism functioning at its core. Duggan asserts that homonormativity fragments LGBTQ communities into hierarchies of worthiness, and that LGBTQ people who come the closest to mimicking heteronormative standards of gender identity are deemed most worthy of receiving rights. She also writes that LGBTQ people at the bottom of this hierarchy (e.g. bisexual people, trans people, non-binary people, people of non-Western genders, intersex people, queers of color, queer sex workers) are seen as an impediment to this class of homonormative people realizing their rights.

== Media ==
Andre Cavalcante says that as homosexuality becomes socially tolerated, representations of LGBTQ characters in film and television have come to reinforce strictures of cisgender, white, and binary authority. Gay writer and director Ryan Murphy's sitcom The New Normal has been critiqued for its homonormative portrayal of queer culture and deemed "more damaging than entertaining." Homonormative media representations are seen only as mimetic of heterosexual normality, reinforcing gay caricatures and "palatable adherents to cherished societal norms and dominant ideologies." Such representations, it is argued, omit the queer realities of non-white, non-binary LGBTQ people, papering over the lived experiences of variant identities and enforcing a "hierarchy by which individuals are expected to conform and are punished if they do not."

While studies show having LGBTQ characters appearing in the media decreases prejudice among viewers, many network, cable and streaming services still lack diversity or cross-"community" representation when portraying queer characters. A 2015 GLAAD report profiling LGBTQ media representation found gay men (41%) still overwhelmingly featured as primary queer characters, despite increases in LGBTQ representation across a variety of sexual and gender identities. More LGBTQ content was produced in the media in 2018. According to GLAAD'S Annual Where We Are on TV Report, which records LGBTQ+ representation on television, the number of queer characters on TV shows rose 8.8%. Queer people of color also saw an increase in screen time; they outnumbered white queer people on television for the first time in the report's history. 1% of the population is intersex, so intersex people are almost completely omitted in the media, with discourses of binary gender identity largely excluding and displacing those who do not fall into the two categories of sex and gender.

== See also ==
- Respectability politics
- Bisexual erasure
- Discrimination against intersex people
- Gender studies
- Heteronormativity
- Intersex and LGBT
- List of transgender-related topics
- Non-binary discrimination
- Normality (behaviour)
- Pink capitalism
- Straightwashing
- Transphobia

== Bibliography ==
- Marcus, Eric. "Silvia Rivera." Making Gay History, 1989.
