= Joseph Simpson (artist) =

British artist (1879–1939)

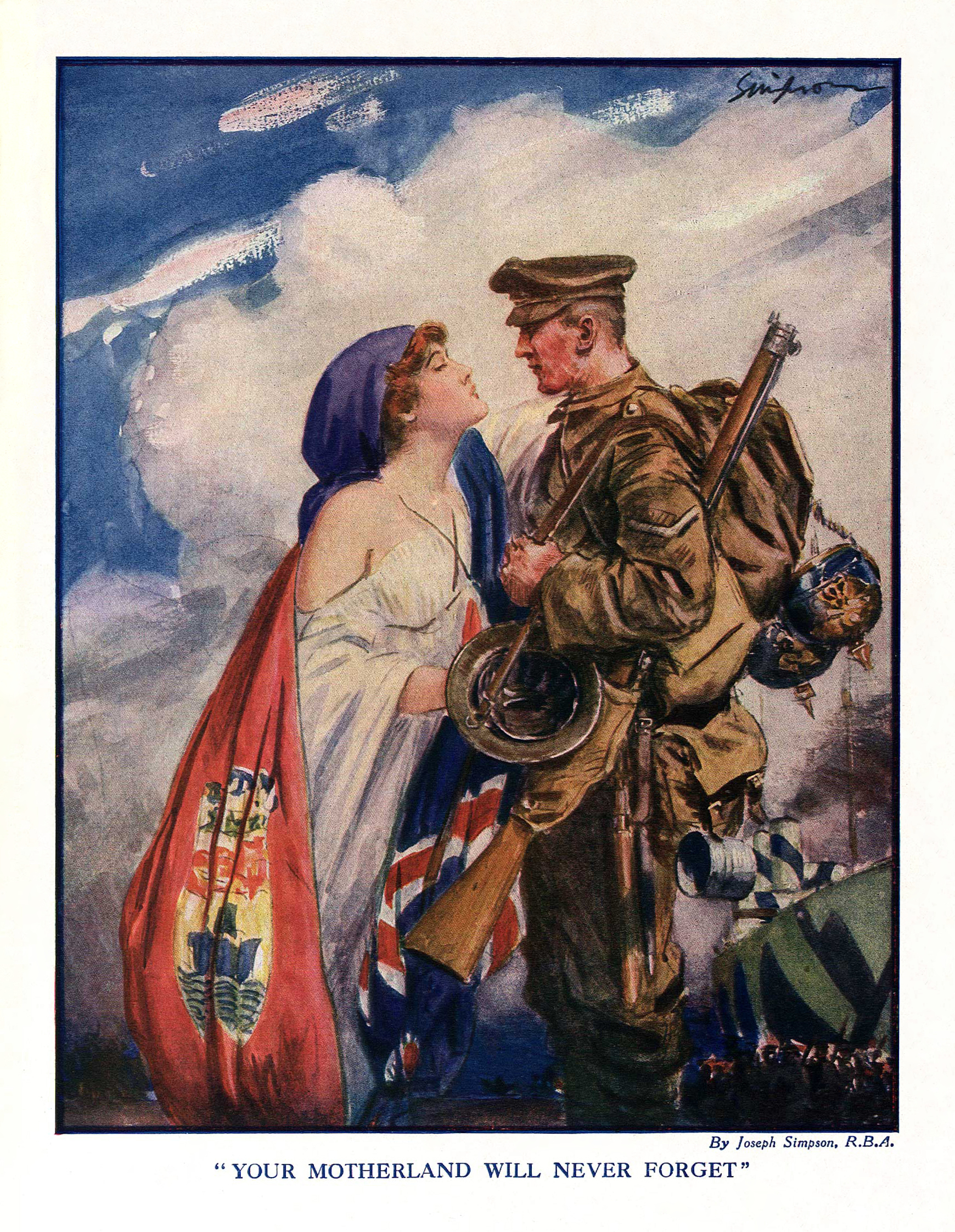
"Your Motherland Will Never Forget", illustration by Simpson from Canada in Khaki, a magazine published in Toronto between 1917 and 1919 that described the participation of Canadians in World War I and aimed to raise money for the Canadian War Memorial Fund. The illustration depicts a personification of the "Motherland" welcoming back a First World War soldier returning victorious from the front, as suggested by the German helmets on the soldier's backpack.

Joseph William Simpson (1879–1939) was a British painter and etcher of portraits and sporting subjects, and a magazine illustrator.

== Biography ==
Simpson was born in Carlisle, Cumberland, in 1879. He attended the Glasgow School of Art and initially worked in Edinburgh as an illustrator and cartoonist. He was the editor of The Book of Bookplates (1900-1903), Books and Bookplates (1903-04) and the later publication The Book-Lovers' Magazine. In 1901 he was the co-author with Wilbur Macey Stone of The Purple Book of Book-plates, which was published in New York. He was employed by the publishers T. N. Foulis as a typeface designer and also designed some covers and bookplates in chapbook style. In 1905, Simpson came to London, working for the press doing poster designs and doing oil paintings in his spare time. His studio was next door to that of Frank Brangwyn who in 1909 encouraged Simpson to do his first etching. He taught for a while at the London School of Art and in 1918, became an official war artist with the Royal Air Force, spending time stationed in France. His first exhibition of etchings took place in Glasgow at Wishart Brown in March 1926, and this was followed in November by a very successful London exhibition, staged by Alex, Reid & Lefevre. He also exhibited in Munich, Venice, Florence and Stockholm. He died in London in 1939.

== Artists' group ==
The Scotsman, after Simpson's death, reported that he had been part of

an interesting coterie of young artists in the early stage of his career. ... A number of young artists of about the same time used to meet in Simpson's studio in Castle Street. By and by they formed themselves into a club for sketching, as well as for discussion and social recreation. The question arose at one point as to what this club should be called; and on the suggestion of one of the company, it was resolved to-call it the "S. P. O." The meaning of these letters was a mystery to those who were not initiated. They really stood for the favourite supper of the club members — sausages, potatoes and onions. At the regular meeting of the club, picture compositions, designing, and drawing were practised and models were engaged. The company included the late S. J. Peploe, R.S.A.; the late Mr Rbt. Hope, R.S.A; Mr J. D. Ferguson (now resident in Paris where his work is well known); Mr Cruickshanks; the Hon. Morton Stuart (afterwards the Earl of Moray), Mr John Menzies, and Mr Ritchie. This band of zealous young artists formed a notable and interesting group. They by and by acquired a cottage, at Rayelston, which formed their country headquarters. They made the cottage a centre for landscape painting in the adjoining woods and the countryside. ... Simpson figured in a number of amusing Bohemian episodes after club meetings, which, for those who knew him in those Edinburgh days, provide happy memories.

== Bibliography ==
- Granville Fell, H. "The Etched Work of Joseph Simpson." The Print Collector’s Quarterly Vol 19 (1932): 212-233 a catalogue of 74 etchings (up to 1931).
