= Canada in Khaki =

Canada in Khaki was a magazine published in Toronto by the Musson Book Company and by the Canadian War Records Office to illustrate Canadians' actions during World War I and raise money for the Canadian War Memorial Fund. Canada in Khaki was published in 1917–1919 in three volumes. The magazine had a subheading A Tribute to the Officers and Men now serving in the Overseas Military Forces of Canada. A collection of war art reproductions, cartoons, military history and personal recollections, it featured illustrations by contemporary artists, such as John Byam Liston Shaw, Harold H. Piffard and others.

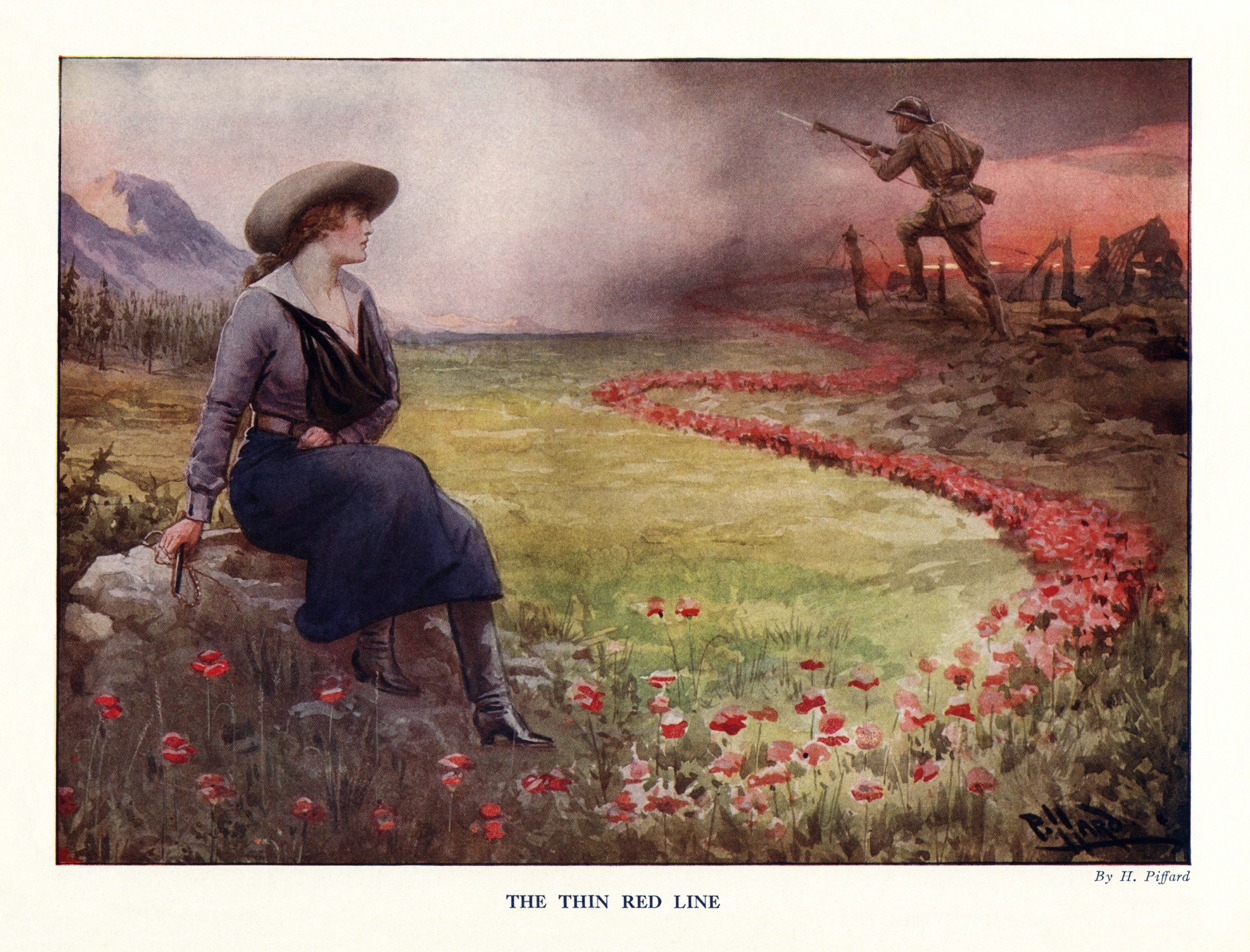
The Thin Red Line by Harold H. Piffard from Canada in Khaki

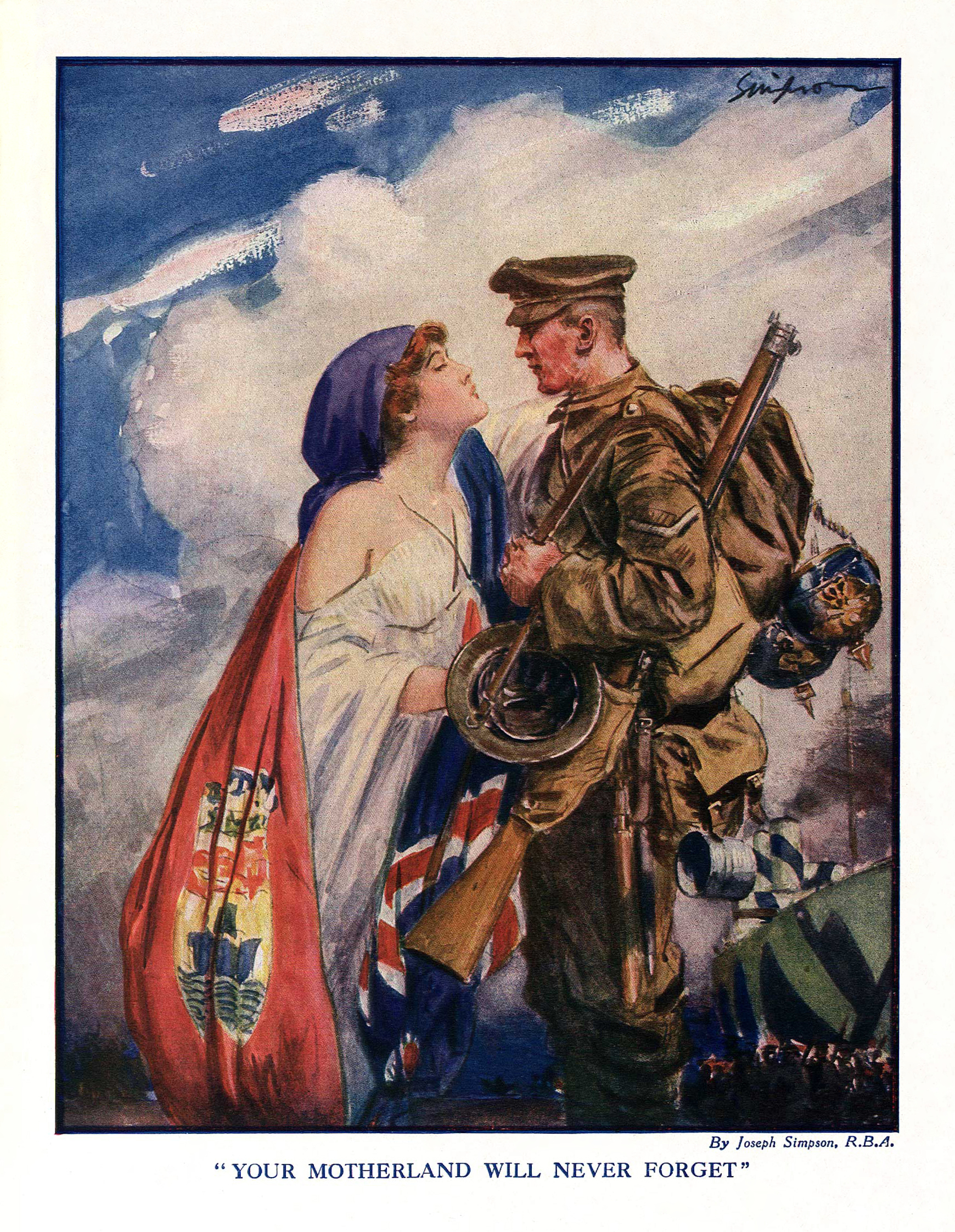
Your Motherland Will Never Forget by Joseph Simpson from Canada in Khaki
