= Heterosexism =

System of bias and prejudice in favor of heterosexuality

Heterosexism is a system of attitudes, bias, and discrimination in favor of heterosexuality and heterosexual relationships. According to Elizabeth Cramer, it can include the belief that all people are or should be heterosexual and that heterosexual relationships are the only norm and therefore superior.

Although heterosexism is defined in the online editions of the American Heritage Dictionary of the English Language and the Merriam-Webster Collegiate Dictionary as anti-gay discrimination or prejudice "by heterosexual people" and "by heterosexuals", respectively, people of any sexual orientation can hold such attitudes and bias, and can form a part of internalised hatred of one's sexual orientation.

Heterosexism as discrimination ranks gay men, lesbians, bisexuals and other sexual minorities as second-class citizens with regard to various legal and civil rights, economic opportunities, and social equality in many of the world's jurisdictions and societies. It is often related to homophobia.

== Background ==
While the Merriam-Webster Collegiate Dictionary notes the first use of the term heterosexism as having occurred in 1972, the term was first published in 1971 by gay rights activist, Craig Rodwell.

=== Etymology and usage ===
Similar terms include "heterocentrism" and "heterosexualism". Although the well-established term heterosexism is often explained as a coinage modeled on sexism, the derivation of its meaning points more to (1.) heterosex(ual) + -ism than (2.) hetero- + sexism.

Given this lack of semantic transparency, researchers, outreach workers, critical theorists and LGBTQ activists have proposed and use terms such as institutionalized homophobia, state(-sponsored) homophobia, sexual prejudice, anti-gay bigotry, straight privilege, The Straight Mind (a collection of essays by French writer Monique Wittig), heterosexual bias, compulsory heterosexuality or the much lesser known terms heterocentrism, homonegativity, and from gender studies and queer theory, heteronormativity. However, not all of these descriptors are synonymous with heterosexism.

=== Contrast to homophobia ===
Homophobia, a form of heterosexism, refers both to "unreasoning fear of or antipathy towards homosexuals and homosexuality" and to "behavior based on such a feeling". Heterosexism, however, more broadly denotes the "system of ideological thought that makes heterosexuality the sole norm to follow for sexual practices". As a bias favoring heterosexuals and heterosexuality, heterosexism has been described as being "encoded into and characteristic of the major social, cultural, and economic institutions of our society" and stems from the essentialist cultural notion that maleness-masculinity and femaleness-femininity are complementary.

Psychology professor Gregory M. Herek states that "[Heterosexism] operates through a dual process of invisibility and attack. Homosexuality usually remains culturally invisible; when people who engage in homosexual behavior or who are identified as homosexual become visible, they are subject to attack by society." Furthermore, in interviews with perpetrators of anti-gay violence, forensic psychologist Karen Franklin believes that "heterosexism is not just a personal value system, [rather] it is a tool in the maintenance of gender dichotomy." She continues by saying that "assaults on homosexuals and other individuals who deviate from sex role norms are viewed as a learned form of social control of deviance rather than a defensive response to personal threat."

=== Parallels and intersections ===
Using the term heterosexism highlights the parallels between antigay sentiment and other forms of prejudice, such as racism, antisemitism, and sexism.

— Gregory M. Herek, researcher, author, and professor of psychology at UC Davis.

It has been argued that the concept of heterosexism is similar to the concept of racism in that both ideas promote privilege for dominant groups within a given society. For example, borrowing from the racial concept of white privilege, the concept of heterosexual privilege has been applied to benefits of (presumed) heterosexuality within society that heterosexuals take for granted. The analogy is that just as racism against non-white people places white people as superior to people of color, heterosexism places heterosexual people or relationships as superior to non-heterosexual ones. In trying to rebut this premise, some commentators point to differences between the categories of race and sexual orientation, claiming they are too complex to support any generalizations. For example, "trainer on diversity" and consultant Jamie Washington has commented, although heterosexism and racism are "woven from the same fabric" they are "not the same thing". Some American Conservative leaders such as Rev. Irene Monroe comment that those who suggest or state "gay is the new black", as in a cover story of The Advocate magazine, exploit black people's suffering and experiences to legitimize their own. Nonetheless, a study presented at the British Psychological Society's Division of Occupational Psychology 2009 Conference shows that heterosexist prejudice is more pervasive than racism.

Heterosexism can also intersect with racism by further emphasizing differences among arbitrary groups of people. For example, heterosexism can compound the effects of racism by:

- promoting injustices towards a person already facing injustices because of their race
- establishing social hierarchies that allow one group more privilege than other groups.

Likewise, racism can allow LGBT people to be subjected to additional discrimination or violence if they belong to or are considered a part of a socially devalued racial category. Some of the privileges afforded to people falling into the categories of white people and (perceived) heterosexuals include, but are not limited to, social acceptance, prestige, freedom from negative stereotypes, and the comfort of being within the social norm and thereby not being marginalized or viewed as different.

== As a set of beliefs and attitudes ==
=== Individual and group level ===
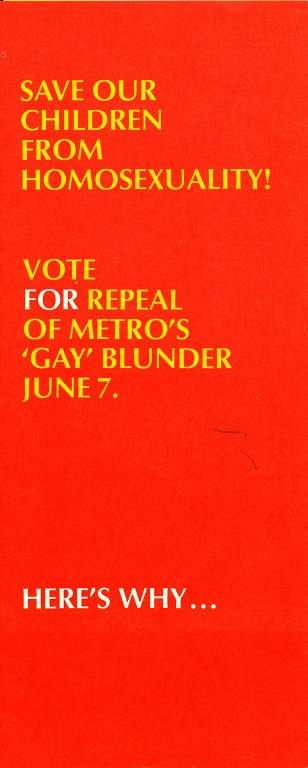
Brochure used by Save Our Children in 1977

Heterosexism as a set of beliefs and attitudes relies on a core tenet according to which homosexuality and bisexuality do not normally exist and, as such, constitute mental illnesses or deviant behaviors. Within a heterosexist ideology or mindset, the concept of sexual orientation is rejected or deemed irrelevant. A set of more nuanced heterosexist views, which some may consider faith, dogma, universal truths, natural law, appeals to authority, or popular beliefs, but others consider to be conventional wisdom or sociobiological knowledge can include, among others, the following:

- Non-heterosexual people should keep their sexual orientations private (i.e., they should remain "closeted").^{p. 15}
- The attitude that gay men are not "real" men or lesbians are not "real" women because of the socially pervasive view that heterosexual attractions or activities are the "norm" and therefore superior.
- "God created Adam and Eve, not Adam and Steve (or Madame and Eve)" and similar essentialist cultural notions that maleness-masculinity and femaleness-femininity are complementary;
- Heterosexuality alone being natural, good and right.^{p. 18}
- The idea that (in the words of Anita Bryant during her Save Our Children campaign): "homosexuals cannot biologically reproduce children; therefore, they must recruit our children."
- Because of their lifestyle, homosexuals do not have families with children, so they undermine the survival of the human race (natalism).
- Homosexuality is an affectional or mental disorder or simply a social ill, therefore, it can be cured or stamped out. If it is not eradicated, it will lead to social disintegration and societal collapse.
- Homosexuals can be converted to heterosexuality.^{p. 109}

In an attempt to bring awareness to people who exhibit heterosexist views but are possibly not aware of it, Mark Rochlin constructed a set of questions in 1977 which are questions that non-heterosexual people are often exposed to, but not heterosexuals, such as "What do you think caused your sexuality?" This heterosexuality questionnaire is often distributed around college campuses to bring awareness of heterosexist sexual prejudice against LGBT persons.

=== Institutional level ===
As well as comprising attitudes held by an individual or a social group, heterosexism can also exist as the expression of attitudes within an institution. As a result, schools, hospitals, and correctional facilities can act as a showcase for heterosexist attitudes in various ways. First, schools may implement these attitudes and ideas through unequal and inconsistent disciplinary actions. One such example is meting out harsher punishment to a same-sex couple violating the school ground rules while allowing a heterosexual couple to pass with a more lenient disciplinary action for an equal or identical violation. Also, hospitals may limit patient visiting only to immediate family, i.e., relatives, and exclude same-sex partners.

Heterosexism affects the family in several ways. For example, in many countries around the world, same-sex marriage is not allowed, so non-heterosexual persons must remain unmarried or enter into heterosexual marriage. Many countries also deny rights and benefits to same-sex couples, including custodial and adoption rights for children, Social Security benefits, automatic durable power of attorney, and hospital spousal rights.

== Research and measurements ==
=== Measurements ===
Psychologists have aimed to measure heterosexism using various methods. One particular method involves the use of a Likert scale. However, since heterosexism is perceived as something that is unseen, it is difficult to determine if someone is heterosexist based on a self-report method. Researchers, thus, have constructed implicit measurements of heterosexism. An example of this would be an Implicit Association Test. A popular implicit association test measuring heterosexism that is open to the public is a virtual laboratory called Project Implicit.

One limitation present in research on heterosexism is that there often is not a distinction between homophobia and heterosexism. Individuals are more likely to be aware of homophobic tendencies rather than heterosexist views; thus, researchers often measure homophobia instead of heterosexism.

=== Research ===
Research on heterosexism has focused on variables that may affect views of heterosexism. For instance, in a study by psychologist, Gregory M. Herek, it was found that there was a gender difference between heterosexual attitudes toward lesbians and gay men. Specifically, the study reveals that heterosexual individuals all seem to have some heterosexist tendency, however, heterosexual males have a greater tendency than heterosexual females to exhibit negative attitudes towards non-heterosexual individuals (this includes gay men, lesbians, and bisexuals). Another notable finding of Herek's study was that heterosexual males showed a greater tendency to demonstrate hostility towards gay men rather than lesbians. Other factors that Herek acknowledges to contribute to heterosexism include individual differences, religiosity, conforming to social norms, right-wing authoritarianism, customs and beliefs regarding cultural tradition, and personal experience with non-heterosexual individuals. Research has also recognized the effects of level of education on views of heterosexism. Wright et al. revealed that higher levels of education, or having more years of education, is related to less homophobic tendencies.

== As discrimination ==
=== Explicit or open ===
This type of heterosexism includes anti-gay laws, policies, and institutional practices, harassment based on sexual orientation or perceived sexual orientation; stereotyping, discriminatory language and discourse, and other forms of discrimination against LGBT persons such as:

- Hate speech, terms of disparagement, hate mail, death threats, "murder music"
- Scapegoating, mobbing, witch-hunts, moral panic; using gay men and homosexuality as a folk devil for the AIDS pandemic.
- Negative portrayals or stereotypes of gay men, lesbians, and bisexuals solely as villains, suicide or murder victims
- Using the gay panic defense in assault or murder cases.
- Sodomy laws when enforced almost exclusively against consenting, adult, same-sex partners. See also: Bowers v. Hardwick and Lawrence v. Texas
- In some countries where homosexuality is criminalized, such as Mauritania, Saudi Arabia, and the Islamic Republic of Iran, offenders may receive the maximum sentence of capital punishment. See also: Paragraph 175
- Discrepancies in age of consent laws in which legal sexual activity between members of the same sex is set at a higher age than that for partners in female–male relationships. Most such laws apply explicitly (or have historically applied) only to male homosexual sexual activity. See also: Morris v. The United Kingdom, State v. Limon
- Prohibiting youths from bringing a same-sex date to high school prom. See also: Fricke v. Lynch, Marc Hall v. Durham Catholic School Board
- Adoption bans against either same-sex couples or gay, lesbian, or bisexual individuals. See also: LGBT adoption, In re: Gill
- Legislation that prevents legal and social equality, i.e., laws that prohibit protection against discrimination based on sexual orientation or perceived sexual orientation, particularly with regard to health care, housing, and employment.
- The institution of female–male marriage and reserving the right to marry strictly for female–male couples via explicit definitions or through bans on same-sex marriage such as "marriage protection acts" (such as DOMA in the United States);^{pp. 145–151}
- Also, the above restriction even when same-sex couples have access to civil unions that are either analogous to or not on a par with marriage;
- Barring gay men, lesbians, and bisexuals from serving in the armed forces or from working in the education field; this can include policies such as the American military's "Don't ask, don't tell" policy or Lech Kaczyński and other conservative Polish politicians' stance to exclude gay men and lesbians from entering the teaching profession. See also: LGBT rights in Poland
- Organized opposition to gay rights; labeling such rights and privileges as "special rights" or the "Gay Agenda";
- Referring to a suspected criminal's homosexuality or bisexuality when in analogous situations there is no mention of a suspect's heterosexuality.

=== Implicit or hidden ===
This form of heterosexism operates through invisibility, under-representation, and erasure. It includes:

- Lack or under-representation of homosexual or bisexual people in advertising to the general public;
- Censorship of homosexual or bisexual characters, themes, and issues in works of art, literature, entertainment; see also "Sugar Time" episode of Postcards from Buster
- Exclusion of historical and political figures' and celebrities' homosexuality or bisexuality; their portrayal as heterosexuals;
- Complete avoidance of mentioning these people and their positive contributions particularly in news media;
- In the context of sex education or professional advice, referring only to female–male relationships when discussing female or male sexual attraction and activity;
- Silence on issues affecting homosexual and bisexual people at school or work or absence of their discussion in a positive light;
- Implementation and use of content-control software (censorware) to filter out information and websites that focus on homosexuality or bisexuality;
- Postal censorship and border control or customs seizure of publications deemed obscene solely on the basis of them containing material related to homosexuality even when they contain no erotic or pornographic material; see also Little Sister's Book and Art Emporium
- Work environments that tacitly require gay men, lesbians, and bisexuals not to reveal their sexual orientation via discussion of their relationship status while heterosexuals can discuss their relationships and marital status freely;
- At public libraries or bookstores: rejection, removal or destruction of books (e.g. Jenny lives with Eric and Martin), films, and posters with homosexual themes;
- Refusal to include families headed by same-sex parents at school events or to represent such family diversity in school curricula; see also anti-bias curriculum;
- Coercive or forced sex reassignment surgery on gay men, lesbian women, and bisexuals – an issue addressed in Tanaz Eshaghian's 2008 documentary, Be Like Others. See also: LGBT rights in Iran
- Forced disappearance, damnatio memoriae, ostracism, shunning, and other forms of social rejection geared towards making homosexual or bisexual people personae non gratae.

== Effects ==
Heterosexism causes a range of effects on people of any sexual orientation. However, the main effects of heterosexism are marginalization, and anti-LGBT violence and abuse.

=== Marginalization ===
The main effect of heterosexism is the marginalization of gay men, lesbians, and bisexuals within society. Heterosexism has led to stigmatization and persecution of not only these people but also those of other sexual diversity such as transgender, and transsexual people. Along with homophobia, lesbophobia, and internalized homophobia, heterosexism continues to be a significant social reality that compels people to conceal their homosexual or bisexual orientation, or metaphorically, to remain in the closet in an effort to pass for heterosexual.

Marginalization also occurs when marriage rights are heterosexist. More specifically, when marriage rights are exclusive to female–male couples, all same-sex couples, be they gay, lesbian, straight or mixed, are prevented from enjoying marriage's corresponding legal privileges, especially those regarding property rights, health benefits, and child custody. Moreover, such limitation prevents same-sex couples from receiving the inherent social respect of marriage and its cultural symbolism.

=== Anti-LGBT violence and abuse ===
Yolanda Dreyer, professor of practical theology at University of Pretoria, has stated that "Heterosexism leads to prejudice, discrimination, harassment, and violence. It is driven by fear and hatred (Dreyer 5)." Along the same lines, forensic psychologist Karen Franklin explains violence caused by heterosexism toward both men and women, regardless of their sexual orientations:

[T]hrough heterosexism, any male who refuses to accept the dominant culture's assignment of appropriate masculine behavior is labeled early on as a "sissy" or "fag" and then subjected to bullying. Similarly, any woman who opposes male dominance and control can be labeled a lesbian and attacked. The potential of being ostracized as homosexual, regardless of actual sexual attractions and behaviors, puts pressure on all people to conform to a narrow standard of appropriate gender behavior, thereby maintaining and reinforcing our society's hierarchical gender structure.

Another form of heterosexist violence as social control that most often targets lesbian women is corrective rape: a gang rape of a lesbian to "cure" her of her same-sex attractions. A notorious example from South Africa is the corrective rape and murder of Eudy Simelane, LGBT-rights activist and member of the women's national football team.

According to a Frontline article titled "Inside the Mind of People Who Hate Gays", bias-related violence against homosexuals is believed to be widespread in the United States, with perpetrators typically described by victims as young men in groups who assault targets of convenience. Victims accounts suggest that assailants possess tremendous rage and hatred; indeed, documentation of horrific levels of brutality has led gay activists to characterize the violence as political terrorism aimed at all gay men and lesbians. Other motives for antigay violence suggested in the literature include male bonding, proving heterosexuality, and purging secret homosexual desires.

== Responses ==
According to an article in the Howard Journal of Communications, some LGBT individuals have responded to heterosexism through direct confrontation and communication, or through the removal of self from the hostile environment.

== See also ==
- Anti-LGBT rhetoric
- Culture war
- Discrimination against non-binary gender people
- Discrimination against people with HIV/AIDS
- Harassment (categories and types)
- Heteronationalism
- Heteropatriarchy
- Identity politics
- Intolerance
- LGBT stereotypes
- Liberal homophobia
- Minority rights
- Transphobia
- Straightwashing
- Straight pride
