= Heteronationalism =

Heterosexuality as a symbol of national pride

Heteronationalism refers to the ideological articulation between nationalism and heteronormativity. It establishes racialized, gendered heterosexuality as a requirement for full membership in the national community, using traditional sexual values as markers of belonging and national pride, as well as the criteria by which a nation asserts superiority over other cultures or social groups.

The concept has been used to describe how certain nationalist discourses rely on homophobia and heteronormativity to define the features of national identity, usually in opposition to liberal policies that are associated with the Western world.

In heteronationalist discourses, LGBTI people are often portrayed as groups whose belonging and loyalty to the nation are called into question, since they are linked to values considered imported or decadent. Within this framework, they are frequently represented as internal vectors of an external influence perceived as a threat to the moral, cultural, or demographic integrity of the nation.

== See also ==
- Homonationalism – Sexual diversity as a symbol of national pride
- Compulsory heterosexuality – Social vision of heterosexuality as the natural inclination or obligation
- Heterosexism – System of bias and prejudice in favor of heterosexuality
- Heteropatriarchy – Social system in which maleness and heterosexuality are privileged
- Hegemonic masculinity – Concept in gender studies
- Straight pride – Countermovement to LGBTQ+ pride movements and events
- Androcentrism – Centering a masculine point of view
- Lavender Scare – Mid-20th century U.S. government discrimination against homosexuals
- Nationalism and gender
- Persecution of homosexuals in Nazi Germany
