= Feminist capitalism =

Capitalist appropriation and assimilation of feminism

The sale of t-shirts with feminist slogans is often criticized because the majority of global textile production is carried out by women in countries of the global South under conditions of labor exploitation.

Purple capitalism or feminist capitalism is a term used to describe, from a critical perspective, the incorporation of some principles of the feminist movement into capitalism and the market economy.

The critique of capitalism in terms of feminism is based on several arguments. First, that the integration of women into the labor market has not led towards a more horizontal and egalitarian socio-economic model. Additionally, gender wage gaps persist, and care work has not been evenly distributed, remaining predominantly shouldered by women.

There is also scrutiny regarding how feminism is instrumentalized to sell products (such as music or clothing). This instrumentation is criticized because the feminist message loses its political significance and becomes merely a trend. These products do not question the production conditions of the majority of global textiles.

== See also ==
- Feminationalism
- Gender bias
- Gender gap
- Gender parity
- Gender perspective
- Green capitalism
- Inclusive capitalism
- Intersectionality
- Pink capitalism
- Progressive capitalism
- Purplewashing
- Women's liberation
