= 120 Dezibel =

Anti-immigration group in the German-speaking world

120 Dezibel (English: "120 decibels"; often stylized as #120dB) was a far-right, anti-immigration social media campaign launched in January 2018. Initiated by members of the Identitarian movement in the German-speaking world (primarily in Austria and Germany and heavily tied to Identitarian Movement Austria activist Martin Sellner), the campaign sought to position itself as an alternative to the global #MeToo movement.

The name of the campaign refers to 120 decibels, which is the standard volume of a commercial personal pocket safety alarm. These alarms are frequently marketed to women for protection against attackers and predators ("rape alarms"). Far-right groups linked a surge in sales of these alarms in European countries to the 2015 European migrant crisis. The campaign targeted sexual assault and violence against women and girls. However, it focused exclusively on crimes alleged to have been committed by immigrants, refugees, or men with migrant backgrounds.

Researchers argue that the campaign utilized "femonationalism"—the weaponization of feminist talking points by nationalist or far-right actors—to foster social solidarity based on exclusion and xenophobia rather than universal women's rights.

== See also ==
- Pink Ladies (anti-immigration group)
