= V. Spike Peterson =

Professor of international relations

- Born: United States
- Citizenship: United States
- Occupation: Professor of international relations

V. Spike Peterson is a professor of international relations in the School of Government and Public Policy at the University of Arizona, and affiliated faculty in the Department of Gender and Women's Studies, the Institute for LGBT Studies, International Studies, Human Rights Practice Program, and the Center for Latin American Studies. Her cross-disciplinary research and teaching are focused on international relations theory, gender and politics, global political economy, and contemporary social theory. Her recent publications examine the sex/gender and racial dynamics of global inequalities and insecurities and develop critical histories of ancient and modern state formation and Anglo-European imperialism in relation to marriage, migration, citizenship and nationalism. Peterson is "considered to be among the most internationally important senior scholars currently working at the intersections of International Relations, Feminist and Queer Theory, and of International Political Economy."

== Career ==
Like other feminist scholars in the field of international relations, Peterson studies the workings of power, and socially-constructed ideas about sex, gender and sexualities in global politics. Rethinking the terms of IR analyses, International Relations scholars using a feminist and/or queer lens seek to broaden the space in which critical approaches to politics are explored – amongst other features of the international system, critiques are applied to the social reproduction of identities and ideologies, heteronormativity, and structural hierarchies. Peterson describes her research and personal interests as concerned with difference, and with crossing borders – both 'conceptually and territorially'. She has written and published over 75 book chapters and journal articles. As well as her role at the University of Arizona, she has been an Associate Fellow at the Gender Institute, London School of Economics (2008–2011), and has held visiting research scholar or professorships at University of Bristol (2018), University of Manchester (2016), Durham University (2014), London School of Economics (2007, 2008), University of Göteborg (2000), University of Bristol (1998) and the Australian National University (1995).

Peterson has been awarded a MacArthur Foundation Research and Writing Grant (1996), a Fulbright Scholarship for research in the Czech Republic (1997), an Udall Center Public Policy Fellowship (2007), and a Rockefeller Bellagio Scholarly Residency (2008). Throughout her career Peterson has received numerous awards, including the LGBTQA Eminent Scholar Award of the International Studies Association (2018), the Charles A. McCoy Lifetime Achievement Award of the American Political Science Association (2016), the Feminist Theory and Gender Studies Eminent Scholar Award of the International Studies Association (2004), the national Mentor Award of the Society for Women in International Political Economy (2000), and three teaching awards at the University of Arizona: the Provost's General Education Teaching Award (2001), the Magellan Circle Award for Teaching Excellence (2008), and the College of Social and Behavioral Sciences Dean's Award for Excellence in Upper Division Teaching (2014).

V. Spike Peterson holds a Ph.D. in international relations, from American University, Washington, D.C., 1988, an M.A. in social sciences: anthropology/African studies, from the University of Illinois, Urbana, IL, 1975 and a B.S. with Honors, in psychology/philosophy, from the University of Illinois, Urbana, IL, 1970.

== Publications ==
- Gendered States: Feminist (Re)Visions of International Relations Theory (Ed.) (Lynne Rienner Publishers, 1992). ISBN 978-1555873288
- Global Gender Issues with A. S. Runyan (Westview Press, 1993, 1999) and Global Gender Issues in the New Millennium with A. S. Runyan (Westview Press, 2010, 2014).
- A Critical Rewriting of Global Political Economy: Integrating Reproductive, Productive and Virtual Economies (Routledge, 2003).
- "Family Matters in Racial Logics: Tracing Intimacies, Inequalities, Ideologies." 2020. Review of International Studies 46, 2: 177–196.
- "Intimacy, Informalization and Intersecting Inequalities." 2018. Labour and Industry 28, 2: 130–145.
- "Towards Queering the Globally Intimate." 2017. Political Geography 56 (Jan): 114–116.
- "Family Matters: How Queering the Intimate Queers the International." 2014. International Studies Review 16, 4: 604–608.
- "Sex Matters: A Queer History of Hierarchies." 2014. International Feminist Journal of Politics 16, 3: 389–409.
- "The Intended and Unintended Queering of States/Nations." 2013. Studies in Ethnicity and Nationalism 13, 1 (Apr): 57–68.
- "Rethinking Theory." 2012. International Feminist Journal of Politics 14, 1: 1–31.
- "Informalization, Inequalities and Global Insecurities." 2010. International Studies Review 12: 244–270.
- "Global Householding amid Global Crises." 2010. Politics and Gender 6, 2: 271–281.
- "Interactive and Intersectional Analytics of Globalization." 2009. Frontiers 30, 1: 31–40.
- "'New Wars’ and Gendered Economies." 2008. Feminist Review 88, 1: 7–20.
- "Thinking Through Intersectionality and War." 2007. Race, Gender & Class 14, 3–4: 10–27.
- "How (the meaning of) gender matters in political economy." 2005. New Political Economy 10.4: 499–521.
- "Sexing Political Identities/Nationalism as Heterosexism. 1999. International Feminist Journal of Politics 1, 1: 34–65.
- "Transgressing boundaries: Theories of knowledge, gender and international relations." 1992. Millenium 21: 183–206.
