= Pink Ladies (anti-immigration group) =

British anti-immigration activist group

The Pink Ladies are a British women-led anti-immigration group that started in 2025. They began in Epping, Essex and their main focus is against immigration and the use of hotels for asylum seekers, framing it as a threat to women's and girls' safety. After that, local groups using the Pink Ladies name showed up in parts of the United Kingdom.

The group was founded by Orla Minihane, a former Reform UK activist. The Pink Ladies have been talked about by New Statesman and Semafor as part of a rise in women's involvement in British anti-immigration activism. The anti-fascist magazine Searchlight has characterised the group as far-right.

== History ==
=== Origins ===
The Pink Ladies grew out of protests in Epping, Essex, that were about the use of the Bell Hotel to accommodate asylum seekers. The demonstrations began in July 2025 after Hadush Kebatu, an Ethiopian asylum seeker staying at the hotel, was charged with sexually assaulting a 14-year-old girl.

The protests drew local residents as well as established far-right activists and sometimes led to disorder and clashes with police. According to The Guardian, Minihane was worried that masked men and hooliganism were hurting the public image of the protests and she believed local mothers should play a bigger part. She then started the Pink Ladies, who got their name from the clothing that the participants wore.

Minihane had previously served as vice-chair of Reform UK's Epping Forest branch and had been selected as a candidate for the 2025 local elections, which were subsequently postponed.

=== Expansion ===
In August 2025, women who called themselves Pink Ladies protested outside the Britannia International Hotel in Canary Wharf, London. Other groups wearing pink clothing later joined anti-immigration and asylum-hotel protests in other parts of the UK.

In January 2026, Emily Lawford of the New Statesman wrote that the Pink Ladies were part of a shift in British anti-immigration activism, with women taking on more prominent roles. Semafor described the group as an example of increasing female participation in opposition to immigration.

== Views and campaigning ==
The Pink Ladies campaign against immigration and the use of hotels to accommodate asylum seekers. The group says that protecting women and girls is the important issue and they focus on sexual offences said to be carried out by migrants and asylum seekers.

Lawford said that the Pink Ladies were part of a shift in how people talk about stopping asylum hotels. She wrote that arguments that used to focus on money spent by the public and pressure on state resources were now being talked about as risk of violence against women and girls.

Searchlight, an anti-fascist magazine, has described the Pink Ladies as far-right. It has said that the Pink Ladies wearing pink clothes and stressing women's safety has drawn support from people who normally do not join far-right politics.

== Political associations ==
Minihane was formerly vice-chair of Reform UK's Epping Forest branch and was selected as a Reform candidate for the 2025 local elections. She later joined Restore Britain, the political party founded by Rupert Lowe, where she served as its spokesperson on women's and girls' safety before leaving the position in September 2026.

In December 2025, Byline Times reported that Minihane was at a protest with Callum Barker, a member of the Homeland Party, a far-right political party. During her speech, Minihane said, "If I've got to wear a far-right title because that's what the narrative is, then so be it". Minihane said that she did not know about Barker's political views before appearing alongside him.

== Organisation ==
The Pink Ladies operate through a network of local groups, with social media (especially Facebook and TikTok) used to plan protests and share campaign material. Minihane has been described as the group's founder and leader.

== See also ==
- 120 Dezibel, anti-migrant campaign puportedly opposing violence against women and girls in the German-speaking world
