= Jasbir Puar =

American academic (born 1967)

Jasbir K. Puar
- Born: 1967 (age 58–59)

Education
- Education: Rutgers University (BA); University of York (MA); University of California (PhD)
- Thesis: Transnational Sexualities and Trinidad: Modern Bodies, National Queers (1999)
- Doctoral advisor: Norma Alarcón

Philosophical work
- Institutions: University of California, Berkeley; San Francisco State University; New York University; Rutgers University
- Main interests: Queer theory; race studies
- Notable ideas: Homonationalism
- Website: jasbirkpuar.com

Jasbir K. Puar (born 1967) is an American academic and author. She is the author of Terrorist Assemblages (2007) and The Right to Maim (2017).

She has written on South Asian diaspora; LGBTQ tourism; terrorism studies; surveillance studies; biopolitics and necropolitics; disability and debility; intersectionality, affect, and assemblage; animal studies and posthumanism; and homonationalism, pinkwashing, and Palestine. She has been credited with coinining the term homonationalism.

== Early life ==
Jasbir K. Puar was born in 1967 and raised in Basking Ridge, Bernards Township, New Jersey. Growing up in a religious Sikh family, her family often participated in protests against the Indian government's repression of Sikhs during her childhood. Puar wrote an op-ed for her high school newspaper explaining the 1984 anti-Sikh riots in India following the assassination of Indira Gandhi.

== Education ==
Puar graduated in 1985 from Ridge High School. She received a Bachelor of Arts in economics and German from Rutgers University in 1989. She has a Master of Arts in women's studies from the University of York and completed her PhD in ethnic studies at the University of California, Berkeley, in 1999.

== Teaching ==
She was a faculty member at Rutgers University's Women’s, Gender, and Sexuality Studies Department for 23 years, where she is now professor emerita. From 2014 to 2020 Puar was the graduate director of women's studies and gender studies at Rutgers.

She is a professor in the Social Justice Institute at the University of British Columbia and in the Women’s and Gender Studies Department at the University of the Western Cape in South Africa.

== Writing ==
In "Queer Times, Queer Assemblages", published in 2005, Puar analyzes the war on terror as an assemblage of racism, nationalism, patriotism, and terrorism, suggesting that it is "already profoundly queer." Her focus is on terrorist corporealities in opposition to "normative patriot bodies," and she argues that "discourses of counterterrorism are intrinsically gendered, raced, sexualized, and nationalized." Puar draws from the assemblage approach developed by Gilles Deleuze and Félix Guattari. She critiques the deployment of homonationalism in the United States as a justification to violently implement the doctrine of American exceptionalism embodied in the war on terror. The United States flaunts its supposedly liberal openness to homosexuality to secure its identity in contradistinction to sexual oppression in Muslim countries. This oppression serves as an excuse for the United States to "liberate" oppressed women and sexual deviants in these countries, simultaneously papering over sexual inequality in the United States. United States exceptionalism and homonationalism are mutually constitutive, blending discourses of manifest destiny, racist foreign policy, and an urge to document the unknown (embodied in the terrorist) and conquer it through queering its identity, hence rendering it manageable and knowable.

Puar's Terrorist Assemblages: Homonationalism in Queer Times, published in October 2007, describes connections between contemporary "gay rights" discourse, the integration of gay people into consumerism, the ascendance of "whiteness", and Western imperialism and the war on terrorism. Puar argues that traditional heteronormative ideologies are now accompanied by "homonormative" ideologies replicating the same hierarchical ideals of dominance in terms of race, class, gender. Some reviewers have associated this argument with the "queer Marxism" of Kevin Floyd. The book is credited with coining the term homonationalism, which went on to become influential in the fields of queer studies, activism and political science.

In 2017, Puar published her second book, The Right to Maim: Debility, Capacity, Disability with Duke University Press. The Right to Maim won the Alan Bray Award from the Modern Language Association’s GLQ Caucus and the Alison Piepmeier Book Prize from the National Women's Studies Association.

She is currently working on a collection of essays around "duration, pace, mobility, and acceleration in Palestine," titled Slow Life: Settler Colonialism in Five Parts.
