= Gender system =

Social system defining genders and roles

Gender systems are the social structures that establish the number of genders and their associated gender roles in every society. A gender role is "everything that a person says and does to indicate to others or to the self the degree that one is either male, female, or androgynous. This includes but is not limited to sexual and erotic arousal and response." Gender identity is one's own personal experience with gender role and the persistence of one's individuality as male, female, or androgynous, especially in self-awareness and behavior. A gender binary is one example of a gender system.

== Gender binary ==
Gender binary is the classification of sex and gender into two distinct, opposite, and disconnected forms of masculine and feminine. Gender binary is one general type of a gender system. Sometimes in this binary model, "sex", "gender" and "sexuality" are assumed by default to align.

== Gender systems around the world ==
In cultures where the gender binary is prominent and important, transgender people are a major exception to the societal norms related to gender. Intersex people, those who cannot be biologically determined as either male or female, are another obvious deviation. Other cultures have their own practices independent of the Western gender binary.

=== Native American ===
When European settlers first arrived in North America, they discovered different Native American nations had different concepts of sex and gender. In the Native North American society "berdaches" were given that name to identify them as gender variants. The Europeans "attempted to explain the berdache from various functional perspectives...in terms of the contributions these sex/gender roles made to social structure or culture." The term "berdache" was deemed inappropriate and insulting as time passed and awareness increased, so a new term was coined in 1990, "Two-Spirit". There were many roles for male and female Two-Spirits, productive specialization, supernatural sanction and gender variation. Some widespread features of the variety of gender roles are: transvestism, cross-gender occupation, same sex (but different gender) sexuality, recruitment to different roles, special languages, ritual roles, and associations with spiritual power. Cross-dressing was the most visible marker but has proven a variable and less reliable indicator of status as a Two-Spirit. However the main interest is that these people are an accepted portion of their society. In some cases they were even given special respect and various honors. The roles varied greatly between nations. For example, a male variant might have to wear male clothing during warfare, but women's clothing any other time. These gender roles were often decided at a young age. If a boy was interested in women's activities, or vice versa, a gender variant role would likely be undertaken in adulthood. "In some societies, same-sex sexual desire or practice did figure into the definition of one's gender variant role, in others, it did not." In the case of the Navajo, there are four genders: man, woman, masculine female-bodied nádleeh, and feminine male-bodied nádleeh. Intercourse between two people of different genders, regardless of biological sex, was not stigmatized. In the majority of Native American societies, biological sex played no part in any gender variant role.

==== The Mohave Alyha ====
In Mohave society, pregnant women believed they had dreams forecasting the anatomic sex of their children. These dreams also sometimes included hints of their child's future gender variant status. A boy who "acted strangely" before he participated in the boys' puberty ceremonies in the Mohave nation would be considered for the transvestite ceremony. Expressing interest in dolls, the domestic work of women, women's gambling games, and inquiring about the female skirt were all ways a boy may be considered for the transvestite ceremony. Before the ceremony, relatives would try to dissuade him, but if the boy persists, they would assist in the preparations for the ceremony. The ceremony itself was meant to surprise the boy. It was a test of willingness. Other nearby settlements would receive word to come and watch. A circle of onlookers would sing special songs. If the boy danced like a woman, it confirmed his status as an alyha. He was then taken to a river to bathe, and was given a skirt to wear. The ceremony would permanently change his gender status within the nation. He then took up a female name. The alyha would imitate many aspects of female life, including menstruation, puberty observations, pregnancy, and birth. The alyha were considered great healers, especially in curing sexually transmitted diseases like syphilis.

=== Juchitán, Oaxaca, Mexico ===
A documentary film entitled Blossoms of Fire, produced in 2000, depicts the people of Juchitán de Zaragoza, Oaxaca, Mexico. It follows the daily lives of the women as they run their businesses, wear colorfully bold traditional clothing and hold their heads firmly high as they carry the weight on top. The film clearly depicts the empowered women and the tolerance of homosexuality and transgender individuals. The community exemplifies an alternative gender system unlike the gender binary that has been established throughout the world. On many occasions this community has been criticized and labeled as a matriarchy; however, the individuals who are interviewed throughout the film tend to say otherwise. They strongly believe that their community is able to function because gender roles are not placed on individuals but rather that everyone is equal—for example there is no identifiable "bread winner". Children are taken care of by whoever can help; food is cooked by anyone who is able to and drinking beer and smoking is not only okay for the "men" of the community. Gay, lesbian, and transgender people tend to feel more accepted in this alternative gender system. Juchitán's society operates under a more egalitarian gender system in which men and women have different, but not exclusive roles, and in which these roles are not necessarily expected. Due to liberal gender performance, third genders also have more prominence in Juchitán than other parts of the world.

=== Machi (Mapuche Shamans) of Chile ===
The machi are the shamans of the Mapuche people of Chile, and are viewed to a large extent by both Mapuche and the Chilean state as keepers of Mapuche political, cultural, and spiritual tradition and power. In many ways the machi represent an alternative gender system in that homosexual acts are more accepted, gender switching occurs, and the practice of polygamy took place. However, though it appears there is more gender freedom, gender switching occurs based on different shamanic practices performed, and the gender associated with the practice is either derived from physical sex based on reproduction, etc., or from the hegemonic gender system of the nation of Chile. For example, political participation has become a masculine practice, while spiritual practices are considered feminine. While one does not have to be a physical "male" or "female" necessarily to perform these practices, they must channel that gender to perform them.

The machi were inevitably influenced by the dominant Western gender system of Chile through state sponsored evangelization, (most Mapuche today are Catholic) and by the Indigenous Law. The Indigenous Law further politicized the machi and further subjected them in national discourse to the gender norms of the Chilean state, changing the way that machi perform gender. "Machi juggle various gendered systems of knowledge and identities according to their intentions, who is present, and in what context"

=== Indian Hindu ===
In Hindu India, there also exists different concepts of what is socially accepted when gender is in question. When compared to the native North Americans, the gender system is essentially binary, but the ideas themselves are quite different from Western thoughts. These ideas often come from religious contexts. Some Hindu origin myths feature androgynous or hermaphroditic ancestors. Ancient poets often showed this idea by presenting images with mixed physical attributes between the two sexes. These themes still exist in the culture, and are even still institutionalized. The most prominent group are the hijras.

==== Hijras ====
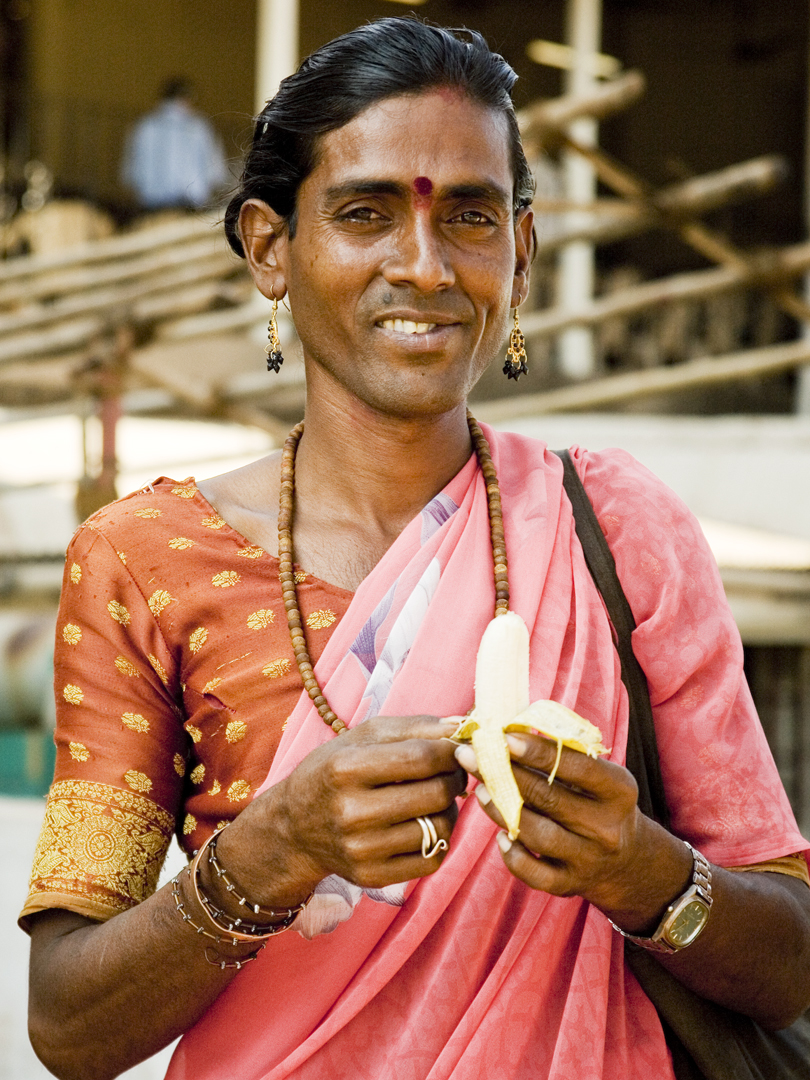
A Hijra from India

"The recognition of more than two sex/genders is recorded in India as early as the eighth century BCE". In modern India, the term hijra is most commonly meant as "eunuch" or intersexed, and is a term of sexual impotence. In the culture's definition, a hijra is one born as a male, but adopts the clothing, behavior, and occupations of women. Their status in society is neither male nor female, neither man nor woman. When hijras are asked whether or not they are male or female, most often they respond with comments like "We hijras are like women", demonstrating their place in culture. Hijras walk, gesture, speak, and use facial expressions more common to women in India. They even take feminine names as part of their gender transformation. Becoming a Hijra however is not outside of Indian society. Being a hijra means making a commitment that gives social support and some economic security, as well as a cultural meaning, linking them to the larger world.

"A male who is not born biologically intersexed who wishes to become a hijra must transform his sex/gender through an emasculation operation". This operation is a rebirth for the hijras, and contains elements of childbirth to symbolize this. The process includes castration, bloodletting, and special rituals. Among the hijra society there is a hierarchy of gurus, or teachers, and chelas, or disciples. In order for one to be accepted into the hijra society they must be sponsored by a guru, who in turn teaches them and helps them form a family.

As of November 11, 2013, the country of Bangladesh has decided to begin a third gender birth certificate.

==== Sādhin ====
The sādhin are similar to Hijras culturally. Their development is quite different however, and their existence is much less prominent. It is a girl's choice to become a sādhin. They wear men's clothing and keep their hair short. They commonly keep their female name and are still treated as a female in society, although the status of sādhin, like hijra, transcends the gender labels of India. A sādhin candidate must be a virgin, and swear to celibacy.

=== Brazil ===
Like in Indian culture, some subcultures in Brazil follow a gender binary that differs from the traditional Western one. Rather than men and women, certain areas of Brazil have men and not-men. Men are masculine, and anyone who displays feminine qualities falls under the category of not-man. This concept is a result of sexual penetration as the deciding factor of gender. Any one who is penetrated becomes feminine, and is not-male. Everyone else, regardless of sexual preference, remains a male in Brazilian society.

Some older authors describe travestis as:

1. Existing outside a religious context unlike in native North America and India.
2. Making an individual choice to become a travesti.
3. Born as males, they go to extensive measures to try to appear female with some injecting female hormones and getting silicone implants to more closely imitate the curves of the Brazilian female body.
4. Not identifying as female and not wishing to become female.
5. Living in a culture that is based on this man/not-man premise and (unlike the hijras) having no desire to remove their penises despite hiding their genitalia.
6. Feeling that castration would not get them any closer to becoming a woman.
7. Having a view of homosexuality that follows the man/not-man binary. If a travesti has a boyfriend, that man is not considered a homosexual, because the travesti is not a man. If, at any time, the boyfriend expresses interest in the travesti penis, the travesti will immediately lose interest in him as a partner because he has also become a "not-man".

Some activist organizations of travestis disagree with such statements and describe travesti as:

A person who is born in the male or female sex but who has a gender identity opposite to their biological sex, assuming gender roles different from those imposed by society. Many travestis modify their bodies through hormone therapy, silicone injections and/or plastic surgeries. However, it's important to highlight that this is not a rule for all travestis. (definition adopted by the National LGBT Conference in 2008).

Differently from transsexuals, travestis do not wish to go through with gender reassignment surgery (change of the genital organ).

When talking about travestis (those who have feminine, boobs, bodies, clothes, hair and/or shape), the feminine gender article "A" should be used. It is incorrect to use the masculine article, e.g. "O travesti Maria" because this is referring to a person of the feminine gender.

In 2020, the State of São Paulo published a booklet with the following definition:

Travesti: a person who is born with the male sex and has a feminine gender identity. She has no discomfort with her biological sex of birth, nor with the ambiguity in female and male body traces, assuming a gender identity different from that imposed by society.

Many travestis modify their bodies through hormone therapies, silicone injections and/or plastic surgeries, but, in general, they do not wish to undergo gender reassignment surgery (known as "sex change").

=== Naples and Southern Italy ===
Femminielli or femmenielli (singular femminiello, cf. Standard Italian femmina, "a female", -ello, masculine diminutive suffix) is a term used to refer to a population of males with markedly feminine gender expression in traditional Neapolitan culture. It may be hard to define this term within modern Western notions of "gay men" versus "trans women" since both these categories overlap to a degree in the case of femminielli It has been noted that this term is not derogatory and does not carry stigma, with femminielli instead traditionally believed to bring luck.

It is often considered reductive to insert the Neapolitan femminiello within the macro-category of transgender usually adopted in Anglo-Saxon and North American contexts. The femminiello, instead, could be considered as a peculiar gender expression, despite a widespread sexual binarism. The cultural roots of this phenomenon confer to the femminiello a cultural and even socially legitimized status. For the historical and symbolic coordinates of Naples, the identity construct of the femminiello is not superimposable to more common European and euro-centric transgender clusters.

The femminiello in Campania may enjoy a relatively privileged position thanks to their participation in some traditional events, such as Candelora al Santuario di Montevergine (Candlemas at the Sanctuary of Montevergine) in Avellino or the Tammurriata, a traditional dance performed at the feast of Madonna dell'Arco in Sant'Anastasia. Generally, femminielli are considered good luck. For this reason, it is popular in the neighborhoods for a femminiello to hold a newborn baby, or participate in games such as bingo. Feminielli participate in games of Tombola or Tombolata dei femminielli, a popular game performed every year on 2 February, as the conclusive part of the Candlemas at the Sanctuary of Montevergine. Achille della Ragione suggests that recent surveys have shown that Neapolitans have a generally negative view of what he calls "the politically correct model of homosexuality of a hypocritical do-gooder society" (implying the mainstream Western gay culture), yet he contrasts femminielli as enjoying a favorable attitude from part of Neapolitan society.

=== Polynesia ===
In Polynesia there are many different terms for gender roles, for example in Tahiti the role is called māhū. In Samoa the male gender variant is called faʻafafine which means "like a woman". Tuva and Tonga have terms also. In Tonga the term is fakaleiti and in Tuva the term is pinapinnaine. All of these terms are used when a male engages in women's work, clothes, speech tones, and nonverbal gestures. However, in Polynesia when a man crosses genders and "acts like a woman" he is not viewed as becoming a woman, but is suspended between male and female, being neither at the same time, but having the elements of both. They tend to be effeminate and interested in women's household tasks, but do not dress exclusively as women. They often seek oral sex with men, who may ridicule them in public, but seek them out for pleasure in private.

=== Thailand ===
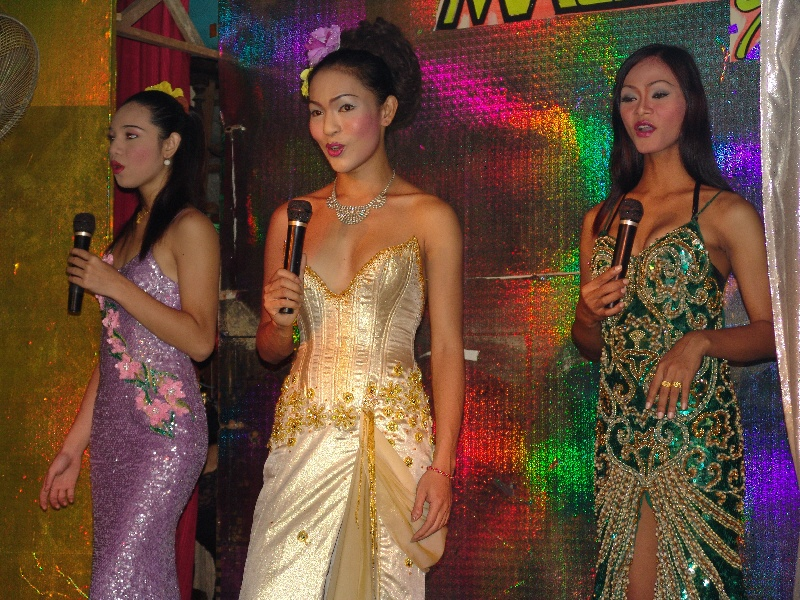
Kathoeys on the stage of a cabaret show in Pattaya

Kathoey is the term used by both males and females that allows them to be alongside the normative masculine and feminine identities. Up until the 1970s hermaphrodites and cross-dressing men and women could all come under the term kathoey, however the term has been dropped for the cross-dressing masculine females who are now referred to as tom. As a result of the shifts, kathoey today is most commonly understood as a synonym for transgender woman. Kathoey is derived from the Buddhist myth that describes three original human sex/genders, male, female, and a biological hermaphrodite or kathoey. Kathoey is not defined as merely being a variant between male or female but as an independently existing third sex.

=== Philippines ===
The notable gender variant role in the Philippines is the bakla. Bakla are males with a feminine spirit, or core identity, who cross-dress and are assumed to take the receiving role in sex. In the Philippines, a "real man" is simply one who is not bakla. Since there are negative connotations of local terms for gender diversity, many bakla prefer to self-identify as gay, rather than a new gender. The baklas' partners are not considered homosexual by Filipino society. Over time, baklas have tried to gain status as a third sex or gender as an attempt to normalize their nonconformity and be equal to males and females in society.

== The cultural definition of homosexuality ==
In cultures where the difference between male and female in the gender binary is masculine and feminine, it is important to look at how same-sex sexuality changes between cultures. In some cultures, like the travesti, homosexual behavior moves one from one part of a gender binary to another.

Homosexuality, and its effects on the individual's place in society is sometimes drastically different in various other cultures. In certain Sambia people of New Guinea for example, it is believed that a boy is unable to reach puberty or maturity without first ingesting the semen, considered life-force, of an older male. In addition, these Sambian people believe that a man is unable to replenish his semen on his own, so the ritual continues until a certain time, usually marriage, when he is told of a tree that exudes a milky semen-like sap he may ingest instead.

In Basotho society in contemporary Lesotho, girls and women may exchange long kisses, engage in cunnilingus, and even fall in love and form a marriage-like union. In this society however, sex requires penetration, and marriage requires a man as a husband. Therefore, in this context, there is no concept of lesbianism.

== The Alternative Model of Gender ==
In "The Five Sexes: Why Male and Female Are Not Enough", Anne Fausto-Sterling explores the possibilities of the intersex and how these individuals fit into the traditional labeling of "male" and "female". Her "Alternative Model of Gender" is a proposition that allows for the inclusion of intersexual individuals into the traditional gender labeling system. Anne Fausto-Sterling proposes that a body does not necessarily have to fit into the orthodox gender binary set by a society, but rather can be categorized under the possibility of male, female, merm, ferm, and herm, which are labels given to individuals born with a variation in sex characteristics. Fausto-Sterling's "Of Gender and Genitals" discuses the fate of the individuals born with "ambiguous" genitalia and the need to surgically correct the deviations these individuals propel into a male-female society. She explores the need for allowing the body to be labeled as is, rather than configuring it into the expectations of society, as the traditional binary gender labeling calls for. The Alternative Model allows for this type of gender labeling as well as to be comprehended in terms of behavioral, biological, and mental characteristics.

== Gendered violence ==
Gendered violence is a worldwide issue that can take place in different forms with varying consequences. It can be similar to a hate crime in which physical violence is specifically targeting the victim's gender. Transgender people and women experience the most gender violence but anyone can be a victim. Women are particularly at risk of gender violence in intimate relationships involving substance abuse, psychological abuse, and sexual abuse. During the COVID-19 pandemic, women were more prone to gender violence due to factors of staying quarantined. Women are 10 times more likely to be a victim of intimate partner violence. This act of violence occurs in the public as well as the private domain and can sometimes be overlooked. Many deaths have resulted from gendered violence, as seen in the film Two Spirits. Organizations such as California Coalition Against Sexual Assault support the Latino communities in particular to end domestic violence. It is also a matter related to the dominant gender system, which often underlies the motives for gendered violence. The dominant gender system also creates structural violence.

== See also ==
- Gender and Sexual Diversity
- Transsexualism
- Transgender
- Transgender rights movement
- Intersexuality

== Bibliography ==
- Duberman, Martin. "Gender Diversity in Native North America: Notes toward a Unified Analysis". A Queer World. New York And London: New York University Press, 1997. 65. Print.
- Kulick, D. "The Gender of Brazilian Transgendered Prostitutes." American Anthropologist 99.3 (1997): 574–85.
- Nanda, Serena. Gender Diversity: Crosscultural Variations. Waveland Press, 1999. Print.
- Nanda, Serena. Neither Man nor Woman: the Hijras of India. Belmont, CA: Wadsworth Pub., 1990. Print.
- Peoples, James G. "The Cultural Construction of Gender and Manhood." Men and Masculinity. 1st Edition ed.Cengage Learning, 2001. 9–18. Print.
- Rupp, Leila J. "Toward a Global History of Same-Sex Sexuality." Journal of the History of Sexuality 10.2 (2001): pp. 287–302. Web.
