= Sexual diversity =

Set of sexes, sexual orientations and gender identities

Sexual diversity or gender and sexual diversity (GSD), refers to all the diversities of sex characteristics, sexual orientations and gender identities, without the need to specify each of the identities, behaviors, or characteristics that form this plurality.

== Overview ==
In the Western world, generally simple classifications are used to describe sexual orientation (heterosexuals, homosexuals and bisexuals), gender identity (transgender and cisgender), and related minorities (intersex), gathered under the acronyms LGBTQ or LGBTQIA+ (lesbian, gay, bisexual, asexual, transgender/transsexual people, and sometimes intersex people); however, other cultures have other ways of understanding the sex and gender systems. Over the last few decades, some sexology theories have emerged, such as Kinsey theory and queer theory, proposing that this classification is not enough to describe the sexual complexity in human beings and, even, in other animal species.

For example, some people may feel an intermediate sexual orientation between heterosexual and bisexual (heteroflexible) or between homosexual and bisexual (homoflexible). It may vary over time, too (sexual fluidity), or include attraction not only towards women and men, but to all the spectrum of sexes and genders (pansexual). In other words, within bisexuality there exists a huge diversity of typologies and preferences that vary from an exclusive heterosexuality to a complete homosexuality (Kinsey scale).

Sexual diversity includes intersex people, those born with a variety of intermediate features between women and men. It also includes transgender and transsexed people, genderfluid people, and so on.

Lastly, sexual diversity also includes asexual people, who feel little or no sexual attraction; and all those who consider that their identity cannot be defined, such as queer people.

Socially, sexual diversity is claimed as the acceptance of being different but with equal rights, liberties, and opportunities within the Human Rights framework. In many countries, visibility of sexual diversity is vindicated during Pride Parades.

== See also ==
- Gender diversity
- Gender systems
- Heterosexual–homosexual continuum
- Intersex and LGBT
- LGBTQ
- LGBTQ community
- LGBTQ symbols
- Men who have sex with men
- Non-heterosexual
- Queer theory
- Sexual minority
- Sexuality and gender identity-based cultures
- Women who have sex with women
