= Gender roles in non-heterosexual communities =

Gender roles in non-heterosexual communities are a topic of much debate; some people believe traditional, heterosexual gender roles are often erroneously enforced on non-heterosexual relationships utilizing heteronormative culture and attitudes towards these non-confirmative relationships.

== History ==
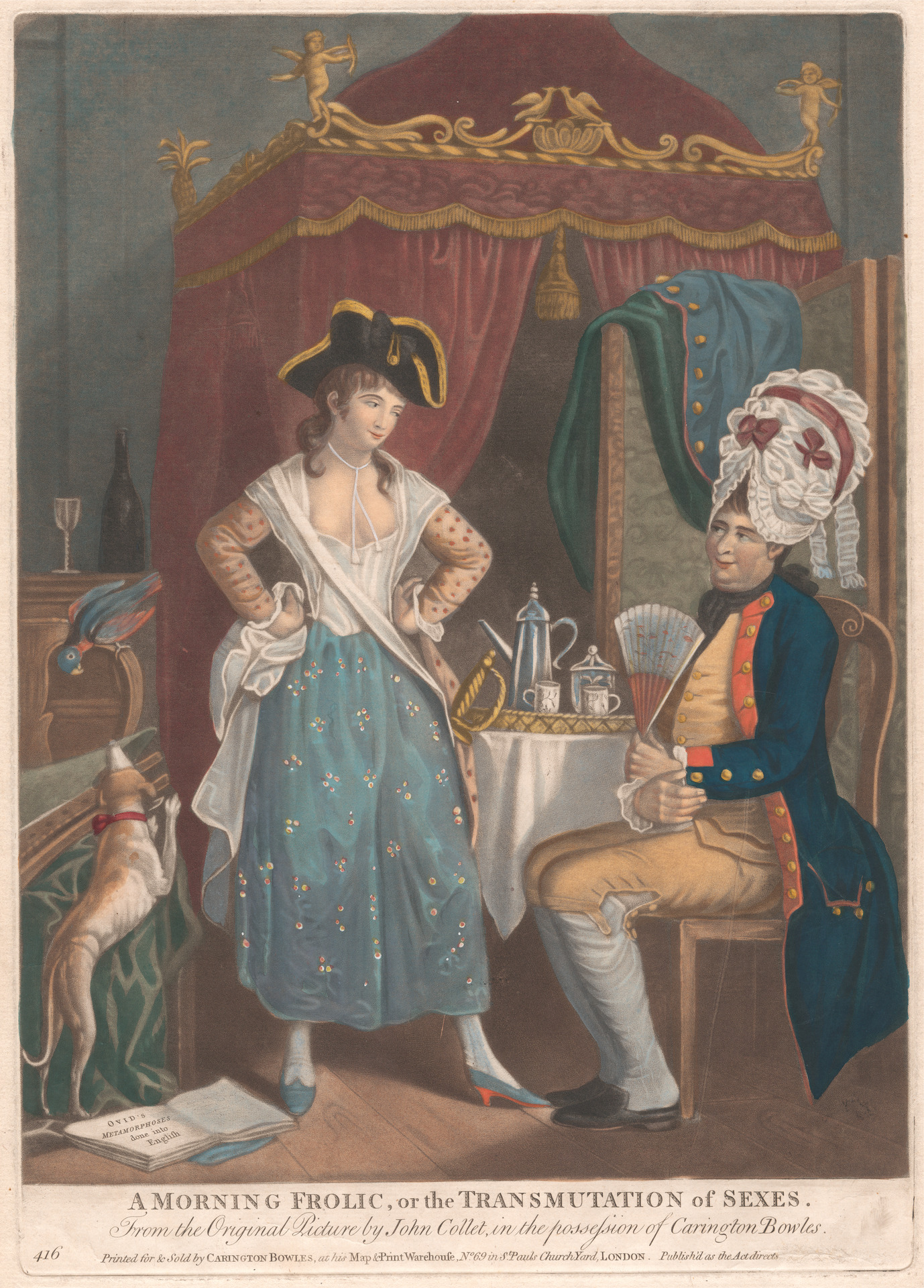
Satire on cross-dressing, around 1780 Britain

Gender roles in non-heterosexual communities have been the subject of debate in Western society. Peter M. Nardi of Pitzer College says:

The connection between sexual orientation and gender roles has been confused by many people. Too often, assumptions about homosexuality or heterosexuality have led to assumptions about masculinity or femininity ... Understanding the differences between sexual identity and gender roles is enhanced when focusing on the issues of friendship and sex among gay men. For many people, being gay has been interpreted in terms of not being masculine or, more specifically, being seen as feminine.

According to human rights campaigner Peter Tatchell:

Queers subvert the gender system. Gay men love males and are not adequately macho and aggressive. Lesbians love women and are insufficiently passive and dependent on men. That's why we're persecuted. Our nonconformity threatens the system which sustains the social hegemony of male heterosexuality and misogyny.

This has been described as "gender fuck politics".

Havelock Ellis and Sigmund Freud thought homosexuality resulted from reversed gender roles. Most modern scientists accept there is no strong evidence that a homosexual or bisexual orientation must be associated with atypical gender roles. Many factors have been linked to homosexuality, including genetic factors, anatomical factors, birth order, and hormones in the prenatal environment.

Terms such as butch, are used within the lesbian, gay, bisexual, transgender (LGBT), and cross-dressing subcultures to ascribe or acknowledge a masculine identity with its associated traits, behaviours, styles, and self-perception.

== Gay and bisexual communities ==
Although many bisexual and pansexual people may consider themselves "gender blind", writers on bisexual issues often disagree with the idea that bisexuals make a conscious decision to disregard socially-constructed gender roles.

=== Women ===
In some ways, [gay people] are already more advanced than straight people. We are already outside the family and we have already, in part at least, rejected the "masculine" or "feminine" roles society has designed for us. In a society dominated by the sexist culture it is very difficult, if not impossible, for heterosexual men and women to escape their rigid gender-role structuring and the roles of oppressor and oppressed. But gay men don't need to oppress women in order to fulfil their own psycho-sexual needs, and gay women don't have to relate sexually to the male oppressor, so that at this moment in time, the freest and most equal relationships are most likely to be between homosexuals.

— Gay Liberation Front Manifesto, 1971

The application of the traditional "man" and traditional "woman" in lesbian relationships is common, as with gay male relationships. However, questions such as "Who's the man in the relationship?" are believed to stem from heteronormative and patriarchal setups of traditional heterosexual relationships.

=== Men ===
Dr. Joseph Pleck says the hierarchy of masculinities among men exist largely in a dichotomy of homosexual and heterosexual males, and says, "our society uses the male heterosexual-homosexual dichotomy as a central symbol for all the rankings of masculinity, for the division on any grounds between males who are 'real men' and have power, and males who are not".

Gay men are considered by some to "deviate from the masculine norm", and are benevolently stereotyped as "gentle and refined" (even among other gay men), and pertain to a specific mode of masculinity for themselves, according to human rights activists such as Peter Tatchell, which each make their contributions to society.

[Heterosexual] men are sometimes advised to get in touch with their "inner feminine." Maybe gay men need to get in touch with their "inner masculine" instead. Identifying those aspects of being a man we most value and then cultivate those parts of our selves can lead to a healthier and less distorted sense of our own masculinity.

— Gay men and masculinity

In a documentary called The Butch Factor, several gay men—one of them transgender—were asked about their views on masculinity. The consensus was that showing masculine traits was an advantage, both in and out the closet. For the "butch" gay men, this allowed them to conceal their sexual orientation for longer when doing masculine activities such as playing sports, as effeminacy is often incorrectly associated with homosexuality so much so that they doubted their own sexual orientation; because they did not see themselves as effeminate, they did not feel they were gay. Because of this, they did not feel as much of a connection with gay culture. Men who had a more feminine appearance were the first to come out of the closet; they were the first to be labelled gay by their peers. They were more likely to face bullying and harassment throughout their lives; many gay men have been taunted using derogatory words that imply feminine qualities, for example, sissy. Effeminate or camp-acting gay men sometimes use what John R. Ballew describes as "camp humour", such as referring to one another using female pronouns as "a funny way of defusing hate directed toward [gay men]". Ballew has also said this "can cause [gay men] to become confused in relation to how we feel about being men".

Some feminine gay men in the documentary felt uncomfortable about their femininity, even if they were comfortable with their sexuality. Feminine gay men are often looked down upon by stereotypically masculine men in the gay community.

A study conducted by researchers from the Center for Theoretical Study at Charles University in Prague and The Academy of Sciences of the Czech Republic found there are significant differences in the shape of faces of heterosexual and gay men; gay men have masculine features, which they say "undermined stereotypical notions of gay men as more feminine looking".

Following a period of non-recognition from the media, gay men have been presented in the media in a stereotypical feminine way, which is open to ridicule (as well as lesbians and transvestites). Films such as Brokeback Mountain challenge this stereotype, though there is disagreement over the definition of the lead characters' sexuality. A newer portrayal of gay men in the LGBT community is as bears—a sub-culture of gay men who celebrate rugged masculinity and "secondary sexual characteristics of the male: facial hair, body hair, proportional size, baldness". Smyth (2004) identified four classic stereotypes of gay men as effeminate, mentally ill, predatory or libido-driven maniacs; these stereotypes arrived in the popular discourse during different periods. This is significant, as if an individual does not interact with LGBT people regularly, they may rely on the mass media for information on LGBT people and LGBT issues and thus retain these stereotypes.

==== Feminine gender roles ====
Multiple studies have correlated childhood gender nonconformity with eventual homosexual or bisexual outcomes in males, (Note: Some studies say that a majority of those who identify as gay report being gender non-conforming as children. However, the accuracy of these studies has been questioned. Brookley, Robert (2002). Reinventing the Male Homosexual: The Rhetoric and Power of the Gay Gene. Indiana University Press. pp. 60–65. ISBN 978-0-253-34057-3.) and gay and bisexual boys who adopted more feminine gender roles at a younger age are at higher risk of reporting suicide.

In the United States, boys are often homosocial, and gender role performance determines social rank. While homosexual boys receive the same enculturation, they are far less compliant. Martin Levine says:

Harry (1982, 51–52), for example, found that 42 percent of his gay respondents were 'sissies' during childhood. Only 11 percent of his heterosexual samples were gender role nonconformists. Bell, Weinberg, and Hammersmith (1981, 188) reported that half of their man homosexual subjects practiced gender-inappropriate behaviour in childhood. Among their heterosexual men, the rate of noncompliance was 25 percent. Saghir and Robins (1973, 18) found that one-third of their gay man respondents conformed to gender role dictates. Only 3 percent of their heterosexual men deviated from the norm.

Thus, effeminate boys, or sissies, are physically and verbally harassed, causing them to feel worthless and to "de-feminise" themselves.

Prior to the Stonewall riots, changes in stereotypical gender role performance were observed among certain segments of the gay male population: According to Stearn:

They have a different face for different occasions. In conversations with each other, they often undergo a subtle change. I have seen men who appeared to be normal suddenly smile roguishly, soften their voices, and simper as they greeted homosexual friends ... Many times I saw these changes occur after I had gained a homosexual's confidence and he could safely risk my disapproval. Once as I watched a luncheon companion become an effeminate caricature of himself, he apologised, [saying] "It is hard to always remember that one is a man."

There is a definite prejudice towards men who use femininity as part of their palate; their emotional palate, their physical palate. Is that changing? It's changing in ways that don't advance the cause of femininity. I'm not talking frilly-laced pink things or Hello Kitty stuff. I'm talking about goddess energy, intuition and feelings. That is still under attack, and it has gotten worse.

—RuPaul.

Pre-Stonewall "closet" culture accepted homosexuality as effeminate behavior, and thus emphasized camp, drag, and swish behavior, including an interest in fashion and decorating. Masculine gay men were marginalized and formed their own communities, such as the leather subculture and bear subculture, and wore clothes such as sailor uniforms that were commonly associated with working-class people. Post-Stonewall, "clone culture" became dominant and effeminacy is now marginalized. This is evident in a definite preference shown in personal ads for masculine-behaving men. Sheila Jeffreys termed this the butch shift of the 1970s, described it as having been inspired by the success of the gay liberation movement, and saw it as being exemplified in the Village People dance music group.

The avoidance of effeminacy by men, including gay ones, has been linked to possible impedance of personal and public health. Regarding HIV/AIDS, masculine behavior was stereotyped as being unconcerned about safe sex practices while engaging in promiscuous sexual behavior. Early reports from New York City indicated more women had been tested for HIV/AIDS at their own behest than men.

David Halperin compares "universalising" and "minoritising" notions of gender deviance. He says, "'Softness' either may represent the specter of potential gender failure that haunts all normative masculinity, an ever-present threat to the masculinity of every man, or it may represent the disfiguring peculiarity of a small class of deviant individuals." The term "effeminaphobia" was coined to describe strong anti-effeminacy. In 1995, J. Michael Bailey coined the similar term, "femiphobia", to describe the ambivalence gay men and culture have about effeminate behavior. Gay author Tim Bergling also coined the term "sissyphobia" in his work Sissyphobia: Gay Men and Effeminate Behavior.

==== Top, bottom and versatile ====
In gay slang, to top means to have anal sex in an insertive capacity (penetrating with one's penis); to bottom means to have anal sex in a receptive capacity (being penetrated). When the terms are used as designations of self-identity, a top may be a man who has a clear preference for topping, and a bottom may be a man who has a clear preference for bottoming; versatile refers to a man who enjoys both and has no clear preference. Studies suggest that most gay men are in this sense versatiles. One study has found that a top is also more likely to act as an insertive partner in other forms of penetrative sex, such as penetrative fellatio and sex toy play.

Because in heterosexual penetrative sex a man normally performs an insertive function and a woman normally performs a receptive function, popular opinion associates topping with masculinity and bottoming with femininity. Gender roles often color power dynamics in a hierarchical manner. Although this is not a requirement, some expect a top to be dominant in a relationship or at least during sex, while a bottom may be expected to be submissive. The expression power bottom refers to a bottom who tends to be dominant during sex.

== Parenting, marriage and the family ==
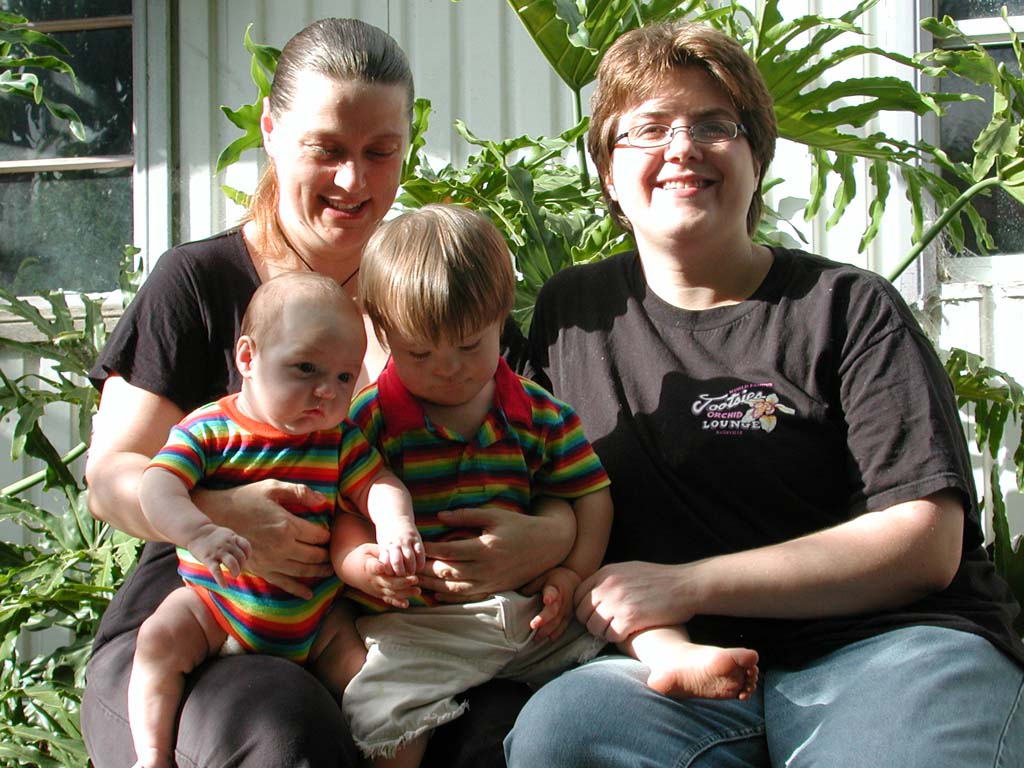
A lesbian nuclear family

There is considerable debate as to whether childhood gender stereotypes are inborn or are influenced by environmental factors. The presence of homosexual or heterosexual relationships in families influences play patterns in children: children of same-sex couples are raised differently, resulting in gender roles different from those of opposite-sex parents, according to the gender binary. A study by Goldberg, Kashy and Smith shows that sons of lesbian mothers play in a less-masculine way than sons of homosexual fathers or of heterosexual parents.

Non-traditional families, that is families where e.g. the mothers work, are now in a majority in the United States; (Note: In the social sciences, the term "traditional family" refers to the childrearing environment that social scientists formerly considered the norm – a middle-class family with a bread-winning father and a stay-at-home mother, married to each other and raising their biological children. "Nontraditional" family forms, by definition, involve any kind of variation from this pattern. — JOANNE PEDERSEN v. OFFICE OF PERSONNEL MANAGEMENT) with the advent of artificial insemination, surrogate mothering, and adoption, families do not have to be formed by the biological union of a male and a female.

The consequences of these changes for the adults and children involved are much debated. In a 2009 Massachusetts spousal benefits case, developmental psychologist Michael Lamb testified that parental sexual orientation does not negatively affect childhood development. Columnist Maggie Gallagher says heteronormative social structures are beneficial to society because they are optimal for the raising of children. Psychologists, Costa and Davies (2012), found that enforcing conservative gender roles, a social structure, is correlated with holding negative feelings and ideas for the LGBT community. Australian-Canadian ethicist Margaret Somerville says, "giving same-sex couples the right to found a family unlinks parenthood from biology".

There has also been much research into childhood gender nonconformity and sexual orientation. Gay men often report having been feminine boys and lesbian women often report having been masculine girls. In men, CGN is a strong predictor of sexual orientation in adulthood, but this relationship is not as well understood in women. Women with congenital adrenal hyperplasia reported more male-typical play behaviours and showed less heterosexual interest.

=== Division of labour ===
Maura Kelly and Elizabeth Hauck conducted research on the division of labour within same-sex relationships by interviewing a sample of same-sex couples (2015). Kelly and Hauck's study found that labour in same-sex couples is divided based on time availability and personal preference. These factors are more influential in the division of labour than the belief that the labour should be divided evenly between the partners in same-sex couples.

Kelly and Hauck's research found that divisions of labour within a same-sex relationship cannot be viewed as setting a precedent as to what gender roles are normal. A female partner in a same-sex relationship may perform chores that are considered feminine, like cooking, cleaning, and child-rearing. However, the other female partner may perform chores that are considered masculine, like outside work and employment outside of the home. The partners' behaviors do not support gender roles because women perform all the roles. There is not an inherent distinction made between masculine and feminine because women are performing both types of chores. This lack of gender role discrimination would be true in same-sex relationships between two men as well.

== Feminism ==
One large myth about lesbians is that they are all feminists. While this is not true, there is a specific branch of feminism called "lesbian feminism", a cultural movement in the Western world, most influential in the 1970s–1980s, that advocates lesbianism as the logical result of feminism.

Vanessa Thorpe says in The Observer, "... key members of the Votes For Women movement led a promiscuous lesbian lifestyle". The women's suffrage movement is generally considered a feminist movement.

Lesbian feminism typically situates the state of being a lesbian as a form of resistance to patriarchal institutions. Sexual orientation is posited here as a choice, or at least a conscious response to a situation. It is also seen as a critique of male supremacy, chauvinism, and masculinity in general. Lesbian separatism is a form of separatist feminism specific to lesbians. In separatist feminism, lesbianism is posited as a key feminist strategy that enables women to invest their energies in other women, creating new space and dialogue about women's relationships, and typically limits their dealings with men.

Second-wave pro-feminism paid increased attention to issues of sexuality, particularly the relationship between homosexual men and hegemonic masculinity. This shift led to more cooperation between the men's liberation and gay liberation movements. In part, this cooperation arose because masculinity was understood to be a social construction, and as a response to the universalization of "men" seen in previous men's movements. In 2010, Elizabeth Wilson wrote that the Gay Liberation Front and feminism worked alongside one another to "spark a way of thinking about human relations in society that has led to significant change"; Peter Tatchell wrote about the GLF's "idealistic vision [that] involved creating a new sexual democracy, without homophobia, misogyny, racism and class privilege".

== See also ==
- Association of gender variance with sexual orientation
- Effeminacy and gay men
- Gender role
- Gendered sexuality
- Hegemonic masculinity
- Heteronormativity
- Human sexuality
- Masculinity and LGBT communities
- Pansexuality
- Sexual orientation hypothesis
- Sissy
- Sociology of gender
- Sociology of the family
- Tomboy
- Western stereotype of the male ballet dancer

== Bibliography ==
- Darryl B. Hill, "Feminine" Heterosexual Men: Subverting Heteropatriarchal Sexual Scripts? (The Journal of Men's Studies, Spring 2006, Men's Studies Press; ISSN 1060-8265)
- Bergling, Tim (2001). Sissyphobia: Gay Men and Effeminate Behavior. New York: Harrington Park Press. ISBN 1-56023-990-5.
- Gagnon, John H. (1977). Human Sexualities. Glenview, Ill.: Scott, Foresman. ISBN 9780673150332.
- Harry (1982). Gay Children Grown Up: Gender, Culture and Gender Deviance. New York: Praeger.
- Saghir and Robins (1973).
- Levine, Martin P. (1998). Gay Macho. New York: New York University Press. ISBN 978-0-8147-4694-3.
- Karlen, Arno (1978). "Homosexuality: The Scene and Its Student", The Sociology of Sex: An Introductory Reader, James M. Henslin and Edward Sagarin eds. New York: Schocken.
- Cory, Donald W. and LeRoy, John P. (1963). The Homosexual and His Society: A View from Within. New York: Citadel Press.
- Newton, Esther (1972). Mother Camp: Female Impersonators in America. Englewood Cliffs, N.J.: Prentice-Hall.
- Stearn, Jess (1962). The Sixth Man. New York: MacFadden.
- Bailey, Michael; Kim, Peggy; Hills, Alex; and Linsenmeier, Joan (1997). "Butch, Femme, or Straight Acting? Partner Preferences of Gay Men and Lesbians.", Journal of Personality and Social Psychology, 73(5), pp. 960–973.
- Halperin, David M. (2002). How To Do The History of Homosexuality, p. 125. Chicago: The University of Chicago Press. ISBN 0-226-31447-2.
- Bailey, Michael (1995). "Gender Identity", The Lives of Lesbians, Gays, and Bisexuals, p. 71–93. New York: Harcourt Brace.
- Nardi, Peter M. (26 February 1992). Men's Friendships. SAGE Publications. ISBN 978-1-4522-5307-7.
- Gay Liberation Front (1971). "Gay Liberation Front Manifesto: A New Lifestyle" (PDF). Gay Liberation Front. Archived from the original (PDF) on 10 April 2015.
