= Dominatrix =

Woman who takes the dominant role in BDSM activities

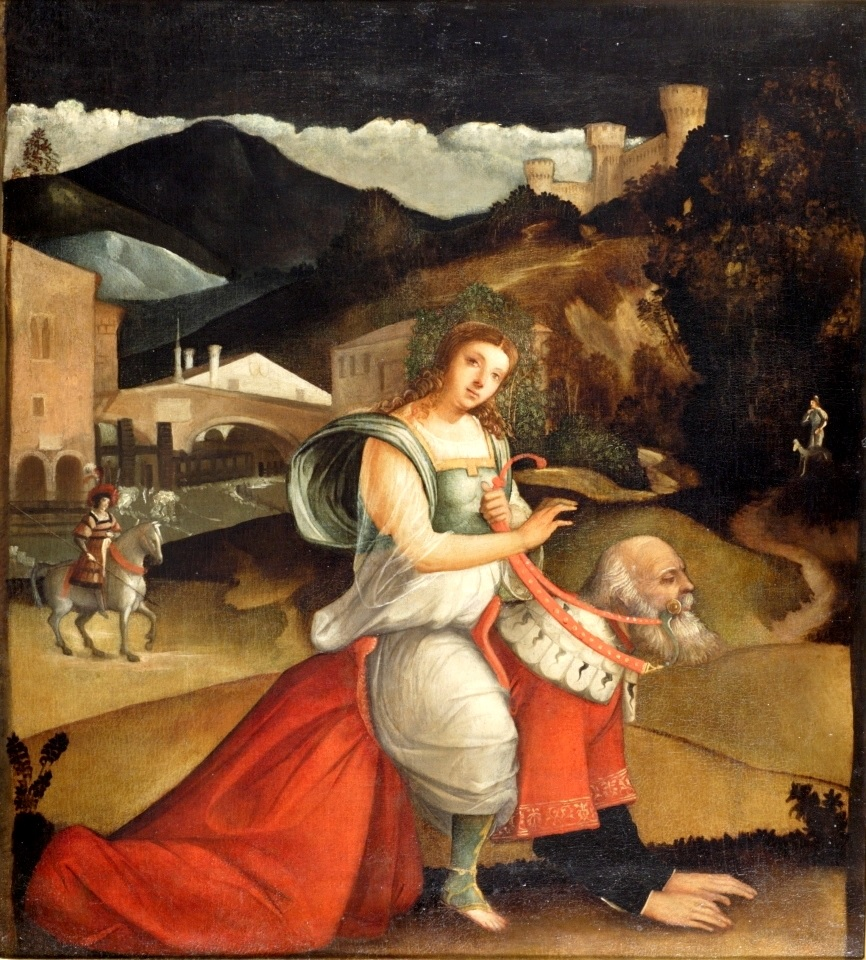
Phyllis and Aristotle, a fictional tale written in the 13th century, as depicted by artist Giovanni Buonconsiglio in the early 1500s

A dominatrix (/ˌdɒmɪˈneɪtrɪks/ DOM-in-AY-triks; pl. dominatrixes or dominatrices /ˌdɒmɪˈneɪtrɪsiːz, ˌdɒmɪnəˈtraɪsiːz/ DOM-in-AY-triss-eez, DOM-in-ə-TRY-seez), or domme, is a woman who takes the dominant role in BDSM activities. The BDSM practice is called female dominance, or femdom. A dominatrix can be of any sexual orientation, but this does not necessarily limit the genders of her submissive partners. Dominatrices are popularly known for inflicting physical pain on their submissive subjects, but this is not done in every case. In some instances erotic humiliation is used, such as verbal humiliation or the assignment of humiliating tasks. Dominatrices also make use of other forms of servitude. Practices of domination common to many BDSM and other various sexual relationships are also prevalent. A dominatrix is typically a paid professional (pro-domme) as the term dominatrix is little-used within the non-professional BDSM scene.

== Terminology and etymology ==
Dominatrix is the feminine form of the Latin dominator, a ruler or lord, and was originally used in a non-sexual sense. Its use in English dates back to at least 1561. Its earliest recorded use in the prevalent modern sense, as a female dominant in sadomasochism, dates to 1961. It was initially coined to describe a woman who provides punishment-for-pay as one of the case studies within Bruce Roger's pulp paperback The Bizarre Lovemakers. The term was taken up shortly after by the Myron Kosloff title Dominatrix (with art by Eric Stanton) in 1968, and entered more popular mainstream knowledge following the 1976 film Dominatrix Without Mercy.

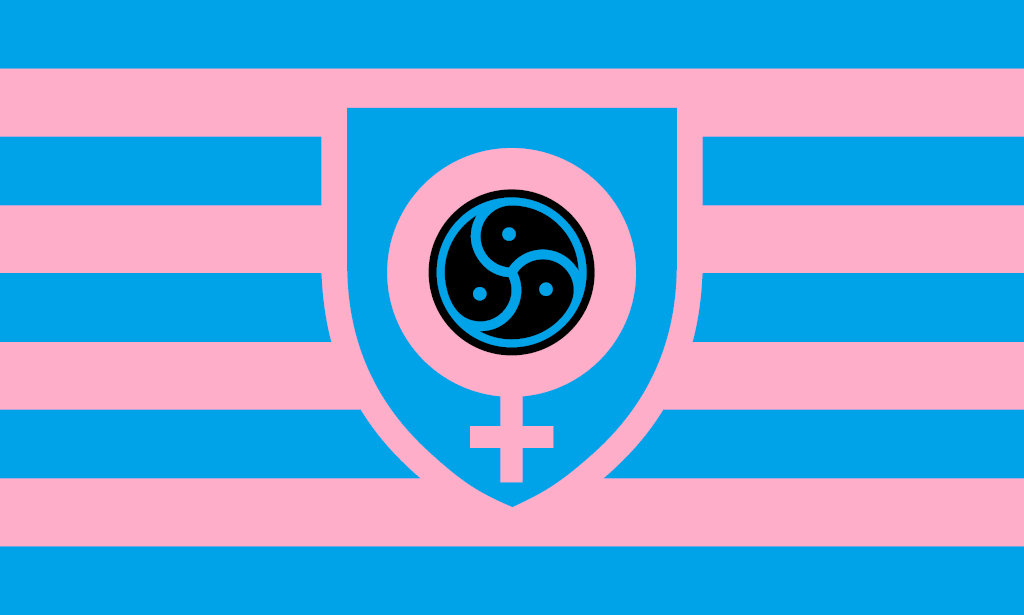
Femdom flag in the Leather subculture

The term domme is likely a coined pseudo-French feminine inflection of the slang dom (short for dominant). The use of domme, dominatrix, dom, or dominant by any woman in a dominant role is chosen mostly by personal preference and the conventions of the local BDSM scene. The media often use the term mistress, as do many professional dominatrices and their submissives, sometimes in the form of the expression dominant mistress. Female dominance (also known as female domination or femdom) is a BDSM activity in which the dominant partner is female.

Members of the BDSM community often avoid using the term mistress. This is because it can be confused with mistress in the sense of a woman who has an illicit relationship with a married man, a term which has the negative implication of cheating on a partner. Since there is a large overlap between the BDSM and polyamory communities, where ethical conduct is a prime concern, any such relationship is a source of disapproval.

Although the term dominatrix was not used, the classic example in literature of the female dominant-male submissive relationship is portrayed in the 1870 novella Venus in Furs by Austrian writer Leopold von Sacher-Masoch. The term masochism was later derived from the author's name by Richard von Krafft-Ebing in the latter's 1886 forensic study Psychopathia Sexualis.

== History ==
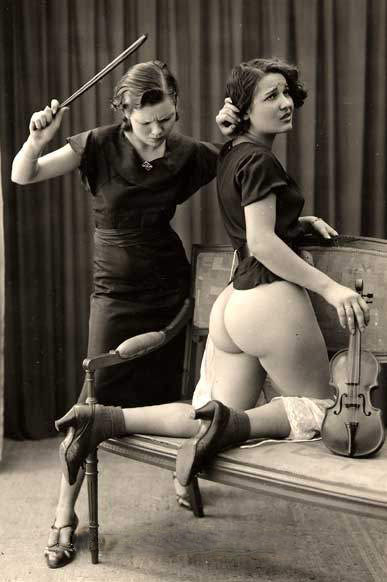
Erotic photograph, c. 1930s, showing a dominant female music teacher caning the buttocks of a submissive female student with a violin bow

The history of the dominatrix is argued to date back to rituals of the goddess Inanna (or Ishtar as she was known in Akkadian), in ancient Mesopotamia. Ancient cuneiform texts consisting of "Hymns to Inanna" have been cited as examples of the archetype of the powerful, sexual female displaying dominating behaviors and forcing gods and men into submission to her. The pseudonymous archaeologist and BDSM historian Anne O. Nomis notes that Inanna's rituals included cross-dressing of cult personnel, and rituals "imbued with pain and ecstasy, bringing about initiation and journeys of altered consciousness; punishment, moaning, ecstasy, lament and song, participants exhausting themselves with weeping and grief."

The fictional tale of Phyllis and Aristotle, which became popular and gained numerous versions from the 12th century onwards, tells the story of a dominant woman who seduced and dominated the male intellect of the greatest philosopher. In the story, Phyllis forces Aristotle to kneel on the ground so that she rides on his back while whipping and verbally humiliating him.

The profession appears to have originated as a specialization within brothels, before becoming its own unique craft. As far back as the 1590s, flagellation within an erotic setting is recorded. The profession features in erotic prints of the era, such as the British Museum mezzotint "The Cully Flaug'd" (c. 1674–1702), and in accounts of forbidden books which record the flogging schools and the activities practised.

Within the 18th century, female "Birch Disciplinarians" advertised their services in a book masked as a collection of lectures or theatrical plays, entitled "Fashionable Lectures" (c. 1761). This included the names of 57 women, some actresses and courtesans, who catered to birch discipline fantasies, keeping a room with rods and cat o' nine tails, and charging their clients a Guinea for a "lecture".

The 19th century is characterised by what Nomis characterises as the "Golden Age of the Governess". No fewer than twenty establishments were documented as having existed by the 1840s, supported entirely by flagellation practices and known as "Houses of Discipline" distinct from brothels. Amongst the well-known "dominatrix governesses" were Mrs Chalmers, Mrs Noyeau, the late Mrs Jones of Hertford Street and London Street, the late Mrs Theresa Berkley, Bessy Burgess of York Square and Mrs Pyree of Burton Crescent. The most famous of these Governess "female flagellants" was Theresa Berkley, who operated her establishment on Charlotte Street in the central London district of Marylebone. She is recorded to have used implements such as whips, canes and birches, to chastise and punish her male clients, as well as the Berkley Horse, a specially designed flogging machine, and a pulley suspension system for lifting them off the floor. Such historical use of corporal punishment and suspension, in a setting of domination roleplay, connects very closely to the practices of modern-day professional dominatrices.

The "bizarre style" (as it came to be called) of leather catsuits, claws, tail whips, and latex rubber only came about in the 20th century, initially within commercial fetish photography, and taken up by dominatrices. Within the mid-20th century, dominatrices operated in a very discreet and underground manner, which has made them difficult to trace within the historical record. A few photographs still exist of the women who ran their domination businesses in London, New York, The Hague and Hamburg's Herbertstraße, predominantly in sepia and black-and-white photographs, and scans from magazine articles, copied and re-copied. Amongst these were Miss Doreen of London who was acquainted with John Sutcliffe of AtomAge fame, whose clients reportedly included Britain's top politicians and businessmen. In New York, the dominatrix Anne Laurence was known within the underground circle of acquaintances during the 1950s, with Monique Von Cleef arriving in the early 1960s, and hitting national headlines when her home was raided by police detectives on 22 December 1965. Von Cleef went on to set up her "House of Pain" in The Hague in the 1970s, which became one of the world capitals for dominatrices, reportedly with visiting lawyers, ambassadors, diplomats and politicians. Domenica Niehoff worked as a dominatrix in Hamburg and appeared on talk shows on German television from the 1970s onwards, campaigning for sex workers' rights. Mistress Raven, founder and manager of Pandora's Box, one of New York's best known BDSM studios, was featured in Nick Broomfield's 1996 documentary film Fetishes.

== Professional dominatrices ==
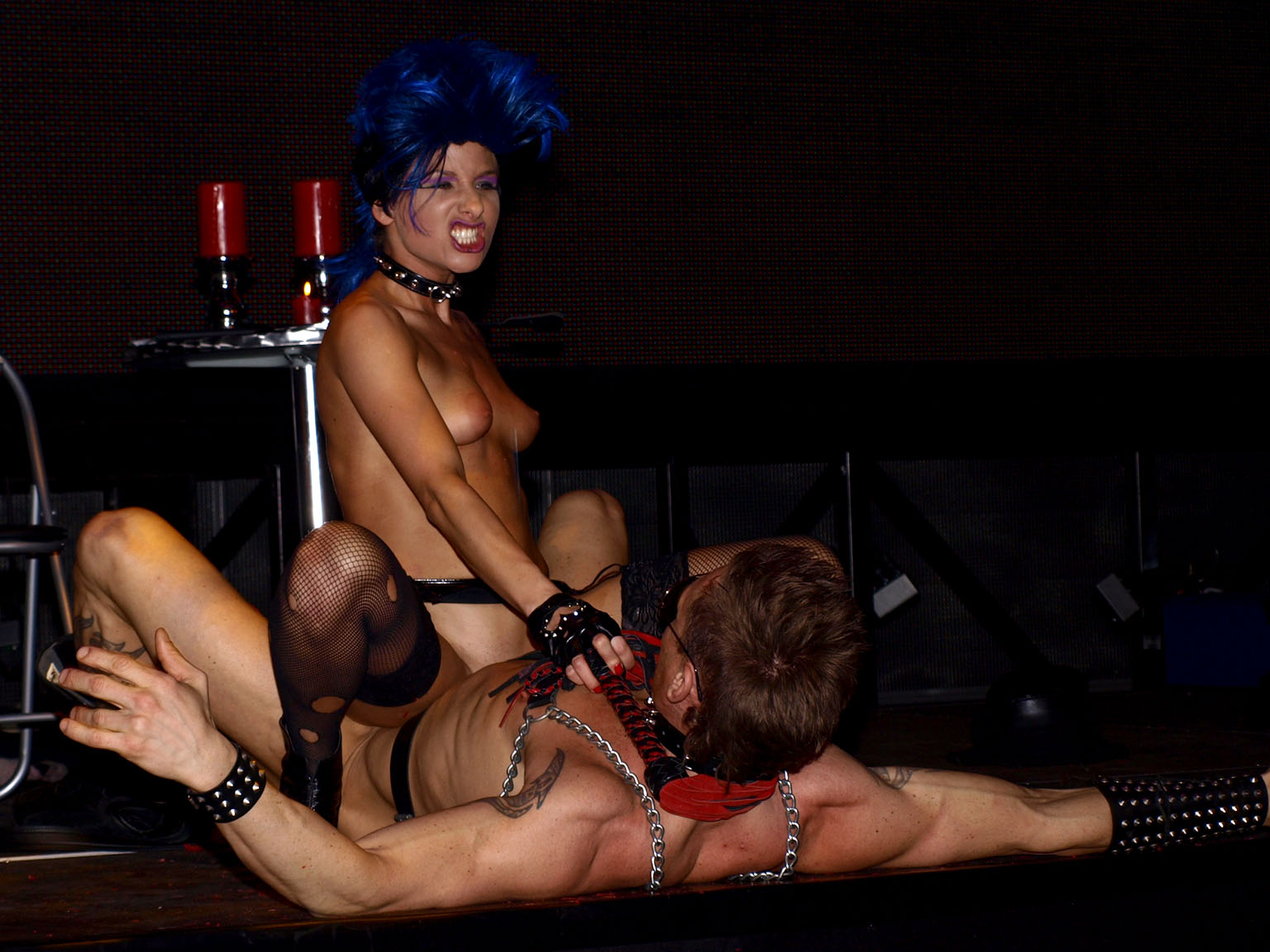
A professional dominatrix and a submissive male perform for the audience at a sex show in Austria.

The term dominatrix is mostly used to describe a female professional dominant (or "pro-domme") who is paid to engage in BDSM play with a submissive. Professional dominatrices are not prostitutes, despite the sensual and erotic interactions they have. An appointment or roleplay is referred to as a "session", and is often conducted in a dedicated professional play space which has been set up with specialist equipment, known as a "dungeon". Sessions may also be conducted remotely by letter or telephone, or in the contemporary era of technological connectivity by email, online chat or platforms such as OnlyFans. Most, but not all, clients of female professional dominants are men. Male professional dominants also exist, catering predominantly to the gay male market.

Women who engage in female domination typically promote and title themselves under the terms "dominatrix", "mistress", "lady", "madame", "herrin" (German for "mistress") or "goddess". In a study of German dominatrices, Andrew Wilson said that the trend for dominatrices choosing names aimed at creating and maintaining an atmosphere in which class, femininity and mystery are key elements of their self-constructed identity.

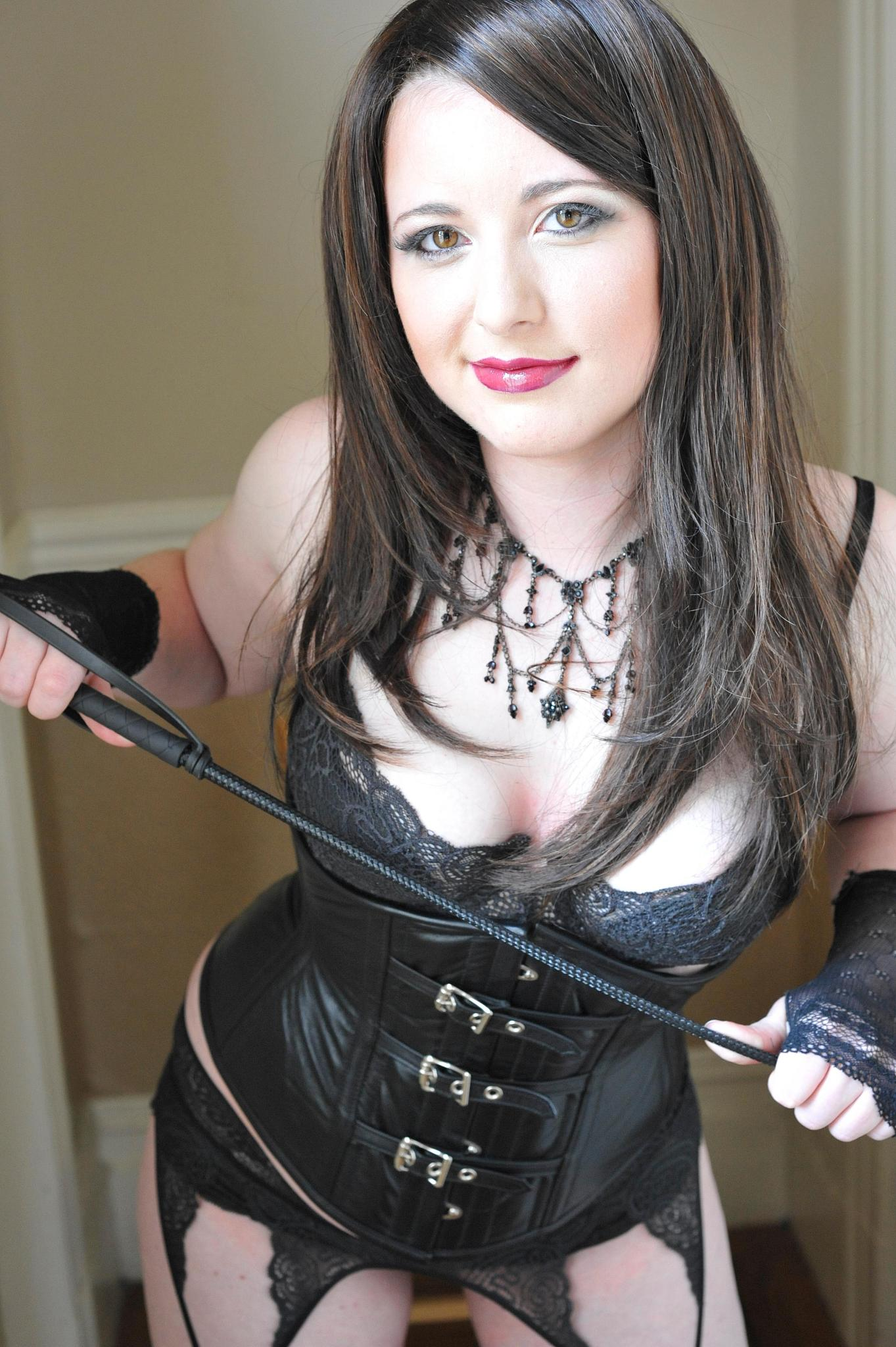
Dominatrix-style attire, 2008.

Some professional dominatrices set minimum age limits for their clients. Popular requests from clients are for dungeon play including bondage, spanking and cock and ball torture, or for medical play using hoods, gas masks and urethral sounding. Verbal erotic humiliation, such as small penis humiliation, is also popular. There are some professional dominatrices that engage in sexual contact activities such as facesitting, handjobs or fellatio but others disapprove of this. Other BDSM activities can include various forms of body worship, such as foot worship, ass worship, breast worship and pussy worship; corporal punishment such as caning and whipping; as well as electric play, wax play, golden showers, tease and denial, orgasm control, and "forced" chastity.

It is not unusual for a dominatrix to consider her profession different from that of an escort and not perform tie and tease or "happy endings". Typically professional dominatrices do not have sexual intercourse with their clients, do not become naked with their clients and do not allow their clients to touch them. Fees charged by dominatrices are typically significantly higher than those charged by prostitutes. The Canadian dominatrix Terri-Jean Bedford, who was one of three women who initiated an application in the Ontario Superior Court seeking invalidation of Canada's laws regarding brothels, sought to differentiate for clarity her occupation as a dominatrix rather than a prostitute to the media, due to frequent misunderstanding and conflation by the public of the two terms.

On the other hand, it is now generally accepted that a professional dominatrix is a sex worker, and many of the acts conducted during a session may be interpreted as equally sexual to the participants.

While dominatrices come from many different backgrounds, it has been shown that a considerable number are well-educated. Research into US dominatrices published in 2012 indicated that 39% of the sample studied had received some sort of graduate training.

A 1985 study suggested that about 30 percent of participants in BDSM subculture were female. A 1994 report indicated that around a quarter of the women who took part in BDSM subculture did so professionally. In a 1995 study of Internet discussion group messages, the preference for the dominant-initiator role was expressed by 11% of messages by heterosexual women, compared to 71% of messages by heterosexual men.

Professional dominatrices can be seen advertising their services online and in print publications which carry erotic services advertising, such as contact magazines and fetish magazines that specialise in female domination. The precise number of women actively offering professional domination services is unknown. Most professional dominatrices practice in large metropolitan cities such as New York, Los Angeles, and London, with as many as 200 women working as dominatrices in Los Angeles.

Professional dominatrices may take pride or differentiation in their psychological insight into their clients' fetishes and desires, as well as their technical ability to perform complex BDSM practices, such as Japanese shibari, head-scissoring, and other forms of bondage, suspension, torture roleplay, and corporal punishment, and other such practices which require a high degree of knowledge and competency to safely oversee. From a sociological point of view, Danielle Lindemann has stated the "embattled purity regime" in which many pro-dommes emphasise their specialist knowledge and professional skills, while distancing themselves from economic criteria for success, in a way which is comparable to avant-garde artists.

Some dominatrices practice financial domination, or findom, a fetish in which a submissive is aroused by sending money or gifts to a dominatrix at her instruction. In some cases the dominatrix is given control of the submissive's finances or a "blackmail" scenario is acted out. In the majority of cases the dominatrix and the submissive do not physically meet. The interactions are typically performed using the Internet, which is also where such services are advertised. Findom was originally a niche service that a traditional dominatrix would offer, but it has become popular with less-experienced online practitioners.

To differentiate women who identify as a dominatrix but do not offer paid services, non-professional dominants are occasionally referred to as a "lifestyle" dominatrix or Mistress. The term "lifestyle" to signify BDSM is occasionally a contention topic in the BDSM community and that some dominatrices may dislike the term. Some professional dominatrices are also "lifestyle" dominatrices—i.e., in addition to paid sessions with submissive clients they engage in unpaid recreational sessions or may incorporate power exchange within their own private lives and relationships. However, the term has fallen out of general usage with respect to women who are dominant in their private relationships, and has taken on more and more the connotation of "professional". Nathalie Lugand in her 2023 book "A Psychodynamic Approach to Female Domination in BDSM Relationships" describes this strict separation as artificial.

== Notable dominatrices ==
Catherine Robbe-Grillet is a lifestyle dominatrix. Born in Paris on September 24, 1930, she then became France's most famous lifestyle dominatrix. She is also a writer and actress, the widow of nouveau roman pioneer and sadist Alain Robbe-Grillet. She currently lives with Beverly Charpentier, a 51-year-old South African woman who is her submissive companion. Although being such a famous dominatrix, she has never accepted payment for her "ceremonies". She's quoted as saying "If someone pays, then they are in charge. I need to remain free. It is important that everyone involved knows that I do it solely for my pleasure." "Catherine is my secret garden," Charpentier says. "I have given myself to her, body and soul. She does whatever she wants, whenever she wants, with either or both, according to her pleasure—and her pleasure is also my pleasure." Robbe-Grillet identifies as a "pro-sex feminist" and "the kind of feminist who supports the right of any man or woman to work as a prostitute, if it is their free choice."

== Imagery ==
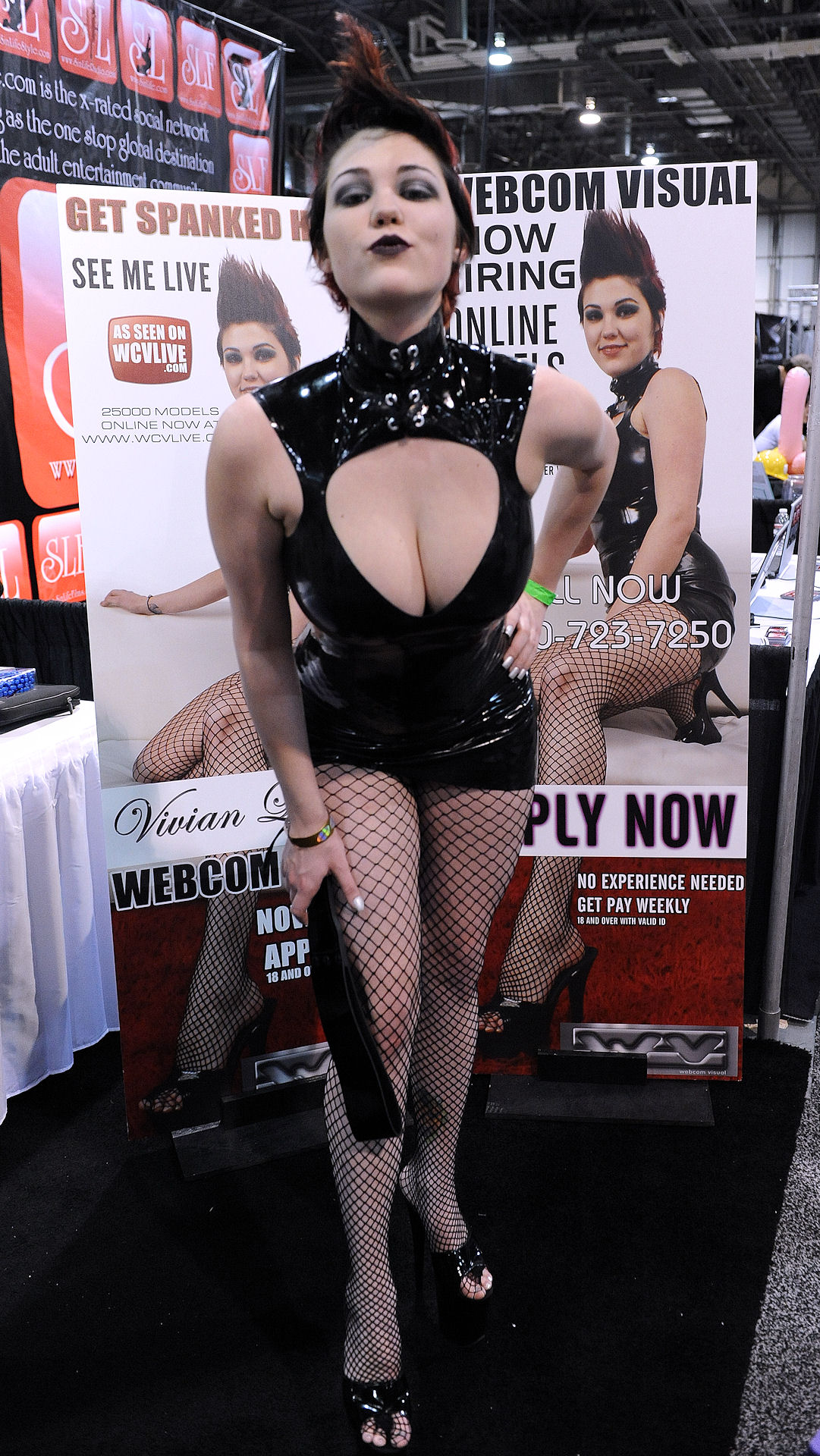
A dominatrix wearing typical fetish fashion themed latex dress, fishnet stockings and stiletto heels. She is holding a spanking paddle.

The dominatrix is a symbolic female archetype. In popular culture, the conception of the dominatrix is generally associated with specialized clothing and props used to signify her role as a strong, dominant, sexualised woman. This role is linked to but distinct from images of sexual fetish. During the twentieth century, dominatrix imagery was developed by the work of a number of artists including the costume designer and photographer Charles Guyette, the publisher and film director Irving Klaw, and the illustrators Eric Stanton and Gene Bilbrew who drew for the fetish magazine Exotique.

One of the garments associated with the dominatrix is the catsuit. The black leather female catsuit entered dominant fetish culture in the 1950s with the AtomAge magazine and its connections to fetish fashion designer John Sutcliffe. Its appearance in mainstream culture began when catsuits were worn by strong female protagonists in popular 1960s TV programs like The Avengers and by comic super-heroines such as Catwoman. The catsuit represented the independence of a woman capable of "kick-ass" moves and action, giving complete freedom of movement. At the same time, the one-piece catsuit accentuated and exaggerated the sexualized female form, providing visual access to a woman's body, while simultaneously obstructing physical penetrative access. "You can look but you can't touch" is the message, which plays upon the BDSM practice known as "tease and denial".

Another common image is that of a dominatrix wearing thigh-high boots in leather or shiny PVC, which have long held a fetishistic status and are sometimes called kinky boots, along with very high stiletto heels. Fishnet stockings, seamed hosiery, stockings and garter belts (suspenders) are also used in the representation and attire of dominatrices, to emphasize the form and length of the legs with erotic connotation.

Tight leather corsets are another popular dominatrix garment. Gloves, whether long opera gloves or fingerless gloves, are often a further accessory to emphasize the feminine role. Neck corsets are also sometimes worn.

Dominatrices frequently wear clothing made from fetish fashion materials. Examples include PVC clothing, latex clothing and garments drawn from the leather subculture. In some cases elements of dominatrix attire, such as leather boots and peaked cap, are drawn from Nazi chic, particularly the black SS officer's uniform which has been widely adopted and fetishized by underground gay and BDSM lifestyle groups to satisfy a uniform fetish.

A dominatrix often uses strong, dominant body language which is comparable to dominant posturing in the animal world. The props she brandishes signify her role as dominatrix, such as a flogger, whip or riding crop, as illustrated in the artwork of Bruno Zach in the early 20th century.

Another often-depicted characteristic of the dominatrix character is of smoking, either of tobacco cigarettes or cannabis products. While smoking tobacco has been in rapid decline worldwide, depiction of it in BDSM literature and media is increasing, as the negative image of smoking reinforces the "bad girl" stereotype associated with a dominatrix.

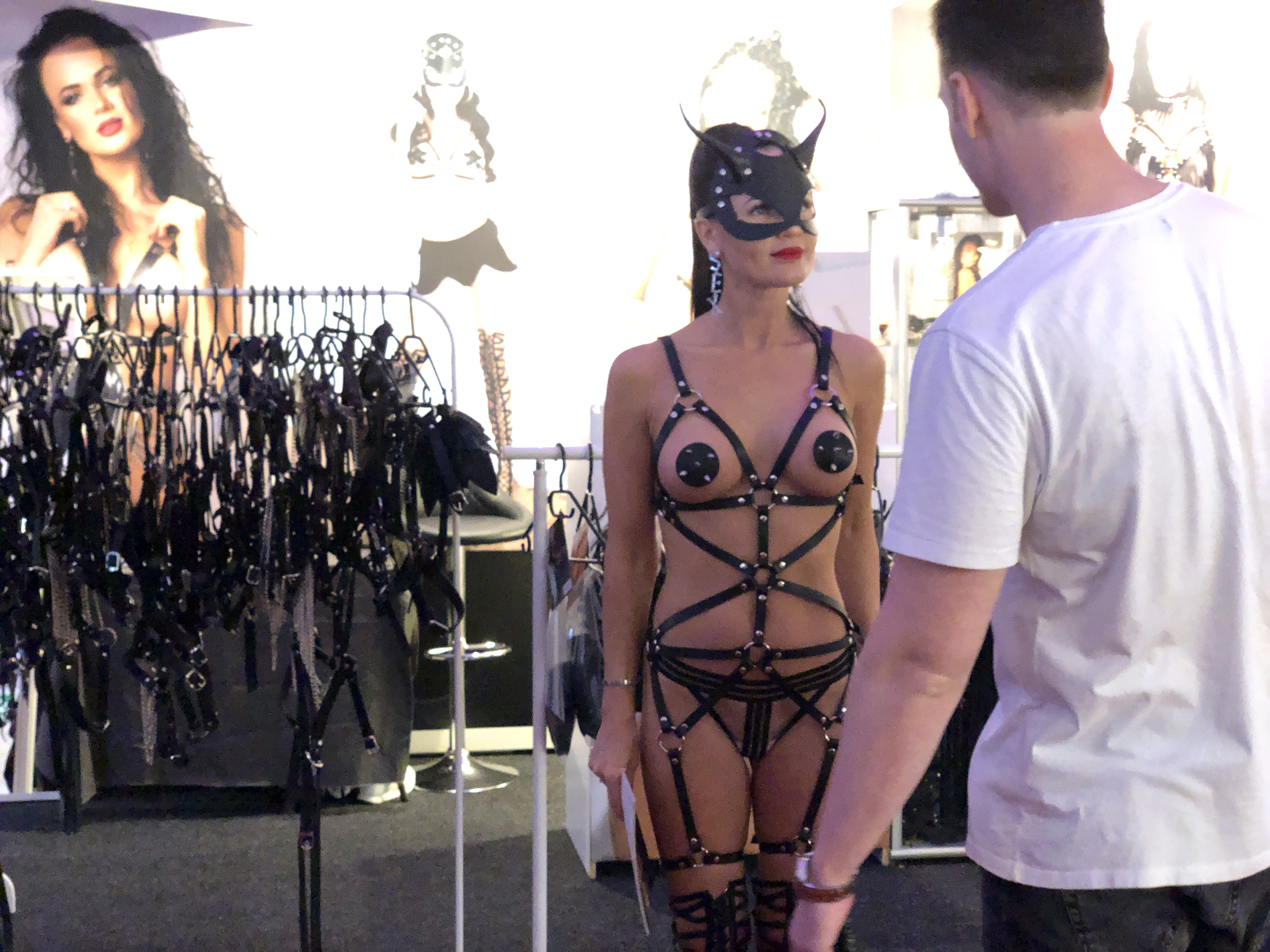
A woman wearing a bondage harness, face mask and pasties at Venus Berlin, 2019

Practicing professional dominatrices may draw their attire from the conventional imagery associated with the role, or adapt it to create their own individual style. There is a potential conflict between meeting conventional expectations and a desire for dominant independent self-expression. Some contemporary dominatrices draw upon an eclectic range of strong female archetypes, including the goddess, the female superheroine, the femme fatale, the priestess, the empress, the queen, the governess and the KGB secret agent.

== In literature ==
Themes associated with the dominatrix character have appeared in literature since the 10th century. Canoness Hroswitha, in her manuscript Maria, uses the word Dominatrix for the main character. She is portrayed as an unattainable woman who is too good for any of the men who are in love with her. The theme of "the unattainable woman" has been used thoroughly in medieval literature as well, although it differs from a dominatrix. Medieval themes surrounding the unattainable woman concerned issues of social classes and structure, with chivalry being a prime part of a relationship between a man and woman. There are some exceptions to this trend during medieval times. In Robert Herrick's Hesperides, a book of poems published in 1648, there were three revealing poems An Hymne to Love, The Dream, and To Love which showcase masculine longing for domination, restraint, discipline. In Ulysses by James Joyce, the character Leopold Bloom has many fantasies of submission to a lady and of receiving whippings from her.

== In popular culture ==
There have been a number of depictions of dominatrices in film and television, almost always featuring a professional dominatrix. Depictions of dominatrices in popular culture include:

- Euphoria is a TV series in which Kat Hernandez, portrayed by Barbie Ferreira, moonlights as a dominatrix. She has to hide this part of her life from her friends and family due to societal shame.
- Bonding is a TV series in which Tiffany "Tiff" Chester, portrayed by Zoe Levin, is a psychology student by day, and dominatrix "Mistress May" by night. Many viewers have not liked the depictions of a dominatrix in the first season, often citing it as "inaccurate". However, they hired a consultant who worked as a dominatrix for 15 years to assist them in the script for the second season and fix the inaccuracies.
- Exit to Eden is a film based on a novel of the same name with a dominatrix-based plot.

== See also ==
- BDSM in culture and media
- Chastity belt (BDSM)
- Domination and submission
- Female bodybuilding
- Female-led relationship
- Female submission
- Feminization (sexual activity)
- Fisting
- Latex and PVC fetishism
- Masculinization (sexual activity)
- Male dominance (BDSM)
- Male submission
- Pegging (sexual practice)
- Sadism and masochism in fiction
- Session wrestler
