= Gynecocracy (novel) =

Victorian pornographic novel

- A modern printing of Gynecocracy.
- Author: "Viscount Ladywood"
- Genre: Victorian erotica
- Published: 1893
- Publication place: England

Gynecocracy: A Narrative of the Adventures and Psychological Experiences of Julian Robinson is a Victorian pornographic novel in the form of an autobiography by the pseudonymous "Viscount Ladywood", in three volumes, published in 1893. It is one of the first published books on petticoat discipline of unruly boys in Victorian England. Its psychological insights were praised by Magnus Hirschfeld.

The author recounts his punishment as a boy at the hands of the governess to whom he is sent, along with three female cousins, after having taken indecent liberties with a household maid. Forced to wear girls' clothing as his ordinary attire, Julian, as Julia, is subjected to frequent flagellations, as are his cousins, one of whom he later marries, submitting to her dominance through continued forced feminization and cross-dressing.

== See also ==
- BDSM
- Cross-dressing
- Cuckold
- Dominatrix
- Sadism and masochism in fiction
- Sadomasochism
- Victorian erotica
