= Sexual orientation hypothesis =

The sexual orientation hypothesis is a hypothesis proposed by Donald McCreary in 1994 that attempts to explain the impact of gender stereotypes on judgments about sexual orientation. This hypothesis states that feminine men are more likely to be assumed gay than masculine women are to be assumed lesbians. This model asserts a broad tendency to associate gender-atypical behavior in men with homosexuality. This is combined with a stigmatization of behaviors held as signs of same-sex attraction in men, and reinforces a stronger culture of exclusive homophobia than among young women.

== Research ==
McCreary ties much of this behavior to particular rigidity around male gender roles. McCreary notes that boys are more severely punished by parents and ostracized from peer groups for displaying typically effeminate traits, which serves to amplify in-group homophobia.

McCreary connects this lack of tolerance among young men to the impact of male gender roles on social status. Overall, the combination of negative reinforcement from parents and a social hierarchy based upon obeying fixed notions of masculinity makes homophobia among young men uniquely toxic. McCreary also notes that the elevation of typically "male" behavior as a social ideal, especially one that is tied to power and authority, amplifies the harshness of in-group homophobia among young men and adolescent boys. However, this latent sexism means that women who manifest more typically male behaviors are not treated as harshly as men who display effeminate traits.

One of McCreary's studies presented a spread of invented personas to a set of college-aged students and asked subjects to identify the sexual orientation of each. These personas included both male and female profiles, presenting either typical or atypical gender traits. Interview subjects were significantly more likely to assume that male personas who displayed gender-atypical behavior were gay or bisexual. These findings suggested that preconceptions about gender roles are more instrumental in judgments about male sexuality, and play a large role in the stigmatization of gay men.

== See also ==
- Androgyny
- Gender bias
- Gender roles in non-heterosexual communities
- Gender roles
- Gender studies
- Homophobia
