= Sissyphobia: Gay Men and Effeminate Behavior =

Book by Tim Bergling

- Author: Tim Bergling
- Language: English
- Subject: Effeminacy, gay men
- Genre: Non-fiction
- Published: 2001 (Southern Tier Editions)
- Publication place: United States
- Media type: Print
- Pages: 133
- ISBN: 1560239891
- OCLC: 44885293

Sissyphobia: Gay Men and Effeminate Behavior is a book by gay author Tim Bergling, published in 2001, that investigates why some gay men are more masculine than others and why society finds effeminate men objectionable. The neologism sissyphobia designates the fear or hatred of effeminate men, pejoratively called sissies.

While researching this topic, Bergling interviewed a number of men, both straight and gay, and analyzed the contents of personal ad sections of dozens of gay newspapers from the US. Bergling found that 40 percent of the ads were masculine-themed, for instance containing clichés like "straight acting", while only two percent were feminine-themed. Bergling argues that many "straight-acting" gay men see effeminate gay men as slowing the process towards gays achieving equal rights. For example, he found that masculine gay men point to press coverage of gay pride events where only a small percentage of the attendees are drag queens, yet the press focuses on the latter. Bergling confesses that "I still wrestle with some sissyphobia myself, as do many of my interviewees."

== See also ==
- Heterosexism
- Homophobia
- Sexism
- Femme
