= Erotic hypnosis =

Use of hypnosis in erotic practices and fetishism

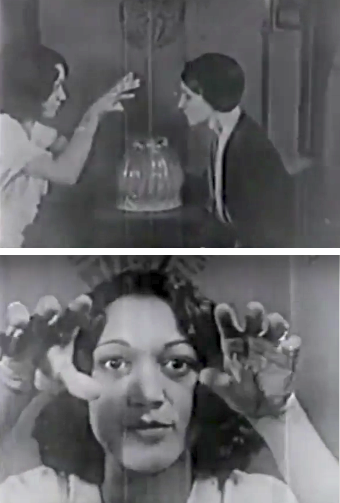
Frames from the 1930s stag film The Hypnotist

Erotic hypnosis (also known as hypnokink) is a broad term for a variety of erotic activities involving hypnosis, often practiced in the context of BDSM relationships and communities. In addition, for some people hypnosis is inherently erotic, making it an example of a sexual fetish or paraphilia.

== Practices ==
Erotic hypnosis can involve hypnotic suggestions intended to increase arousal, to create or enhance sexual pleasure (which may involve "hands-free orgasms"), to produce new sensations, to freeze partners in place or simulate bondage, or to enhance roleplay, with popular types of hypnotic roleplay including animal transformations, robot play and doll play. Erotic hypnosis may be done face-to-face, over video conferencing or text chat, or through pre-recorded audio files or videos. Sessions may involve suggestions that are to take effect during trance or afterwards, in the form of post-hypnotic suggestions, some of which might be triggered by an action or situation.

== Relation to BDSM ==
Hypnosis is an increasingly popular practice within a dominance and submission relationship to reinforce power exchange and as a form of kinky play. Some people report that being hypnotized produces a strong feeling of giving up control, for example the feeling that they must obey the hypnotist's commands. Major BDSM events in North America now frequently contain classes and workshops dedicated to erotic hypnosis, such as events run by Black Rose and TES. In addition to a presence at these general BDSM events, since 2009 national-level erotic hypnosis conventions have been held in cities in North America and worldwide, as well as local meetups such as munches.

== As a fetish ==
A subset of those interested in erotic hypnosis find hypnosis inherently erotic, making it an example of a sexual fetish. They may be aroused by hypnotizing others, by the feeling of being hypnotized, and/or by seeing people being hypnotized.

Hypnosis fetishism has been recorded in the clinical literature as far back as 1957, when George Merrill noted that "to many hypnotic subjects, hypnosis has strong sexual connotations". In one case study of a patient who eroticized hypnosis, he wrote

Her enthusiasm for hypnosis, her obvious enjoyment of the trance, and her relaxed, happy, 'starry-eyed' appearance after awakening from each trance suggested that she was deriving more gratification from the hypnotic experience than would be likely just from the relief of symptoms and the gaining of insight.

Hypnosis fetishism has a large overlap with mind control fetishism, which in addition to typically unrealistic, fantasy depictions of hypnotic control, may include magic (e.g., telepathy, vampirism) or fictional technology (e.g., brainwashing machines, robotization) as plot devices.

Psychologist and author Devon Price has discussed having a hypnosis fetish, writing, "Even in its most stagey and sterile forms, I find it inescapably erotic."

== Society and culture ==
=== Cinema and stag films ===
Hypnosis had a link to perceptions of erotic and criminal transgression in mainstream cinema, particularly in the early to mid-twentieth century, popularising the idea of the "evil hypnotist" and the "scientific brainwasher." These tropes were replicated in stag films at the time, such as the 1930s stag film The Hypnotist.

=== On the internet ===
A model poses as a hypnotist for an erotic photoshoot.

==== History ====
Hypnosis and mind control fetish content has been shared on the internet since its early years, as in a 1997 survey of stories from alt.sex.stories which found that "five percent of stories involved some kind of mind control (such as hypnosis, the use of mythical mind control machines or drugs)". Erotic hypnosis content on the internet has appeared as audio files, videos, and literature.

==== Modern day ====
Erotic hypnosis is now somewhat prominent as a niche on the internet. As of 2025, the r/EroticHypnosis subreddit on Reddit has over 179,000 members.

Videos consisting of rapidly edited sexual clips combined with text or audio that caters to fantasies of being brainwashed, for example into feminization, have gained in popularity. A 2023 study in Sexuality & Culture found that "sissy hypno" content is viewed by cisgender men, as well as transgender women who may use the media "as a tool of sexual identity affirmation and further sexual exploration." Another article in Transgender Studies Quarterly found that for transgender women, these videos "create space for viewers to experiment with gendered embodiment through imagining a future-oriented transformation into a trans* subject."

==== Controversy ====
Erotic hypnosis (sometimes branded "Hypnokink") content has been subject to restrictions on pornographic websites for a combination of reasons, though particularly due to concerns about sexual consent. In 2019, subscription platform Patreon banned erotic content depicting non-consensual hypnosis under its policy against "glorification of sexual violence," particularly what it called "coerced consent" content. Proponents of hypnosis pornography argue that it is an example of consensual non-consent, and that many examples of hypnosis in fictional media portray it as non-consensual, leading to the belief that hypnotized performers do not fully consent to the experience in real life.

In 2023, an article from BuzzFeed News alleged a series of recordings known as Bambi Sleep had eroded and violated the consent of their hypnotic subjects by supposedly creating "obedient, feminine, dim-witted, sex-obsessed people" who could not recall the incidents afterwards. Other practitioners of erotic hypnosis criticized the article, agreeing that the files were "unsafe," but arguing that the article portrayed the community as a "monolith," and that "Bambi Sleep is a tiny part of an intensely broad hypnokink space."
