= Straight-acting =

Gay person who presents as straight

Straight-acting is a term for LGBT individuals who do not exhibit the typical appearance or mannerisms of what is seen as stereotypically gay. Although the label is used by and reserved almost exclusively for gay and bisexual men, it may also be used to describe lesbian or bisexual women exhibiting a typically feminine appearance and mannerisms. Since the term invokes negative stereotypes of gay people, its application is often controversial and may cause offense. An alternative term for men is simply masculine.

== Proposed explanations and criticisms ==
Communication scholar Shinsuke Eguchi and Tim Berling proposed that sissyphobia – stigmatization of or discrimination against effeminate men (not restricted to gay men) – explained the emergence of the straight acting phenomenon in 2009.

Sex advice columnist Dan Savage commented on the popularity of the term "straight-acting" in gay personal ads, criticizing both the practice and the idea that a man seeking a gay relationship through a gay personal ad is acting straight. Defenders of the term maintain it refers merely to one's mannerisms and that critics' isolation of the word "acting" in the phrase distorts the intended meaning of the phrase. Use of the term itself has been labeled as damaging to the LGBT community, as it associates certain attributes with homosexuality.

Men who use the expression "straight-acting" may express resentment that critics claim the term implies they are acting and not being their true selves.

== QUASH ==
Queers United Against Straight Acting Homosexuals (QUASH) was the organization in Chicago that published an often cited article in their newsletter in 1993, titled "Assimilation is Killing Us Fight For a Queer United Front." The article calls for a new order in our gendered social systems to be inclusive and not exclude anyone from liberation, challenging the power and privilege of the dominant members of society. An article similar to "Assimilation is Killing Us", published a year later, entitled, QUASH, still standing for Queers United Against Straight-Acting Homosexuals, used the same concept of rejection of the established gendered protocols, specifically, that there can be varied and better institutions than couplehood and marriage.

== See also ==
- Acting white
- Butch (gay slang)
- Down-low
- Gaydar
- Gender role (in non-heterosexuals)
- Internalized homophobia
- Liberal homophobia
- Masculinity
- Men who have sex with men
- Metrosexual
- LGBT erasure
- Same-sex attraction
- Straightwashing
