= Liberal homophobia =

Acceptance of homosexuality that is homophobic in nature

Liberal homophobia is the acceptance of homosexuality as long as it remains hidden. It is a type of homophobia in which, despite outward acceptance of sexual diversity, prejudices and stereotypes that marginalize or underestimate LGBTQ people are perpetuated.

== Definition ==
Liberal homophobia is a practice that is based on understanding relationships and sexuality as private issues and, therefore, accepting individual freedom over them as long as they do not emerge in the public sphere. However, members of the LGBTQ movement maintain that sexual orientation is an inherently public issue because straight people are not constrained to hide their relationships in public as gay people are.

Liberal homophobia is expressed in many areas where homosexuality is made public, such as the LGBT pride parades, awareness campaigns in schools, at work, being out of the closet, or having gender non-conforming mannerisms or dress, without taking into account the discrimination that LGBTQIA+ people face.

Authors such as Alberto Mira and Daniel Borrillo consider that this is a type of homophobia that is characterized by the "yes, but...". Homosexuality is tolerated, provided it is silenced and heterocentric normality is accepted. Any transgression of that norm is rejected as victimist, ghettoed, activist or proselytizer. In the words of Mira:

It's extraordinarily simple: "yes, but...". In this syntactic structure, any type of statement is inserted: "homosexuals are wonderful and very good friends of mine, but they must abandon the flamboyance; homosexuals are people like everyone but the exhibitionism that they manifest is out of place." There is a limit that still has to be overcome: that of positive images or vindication.
Es extraordinariamente simple: «sí, pero…». En esta estructura sintáctica se inserta cualquier tipo de enunciado: «los homosexuales son maravillosos y muy amigos míos pero deben abandonar la pluma; los homosexuales son personas como todos pero el exhibicionismo que manifiestan está fuera de lugar». Hay un límite que todavía cuesta superar: el de las imágenes positivas o la reivindicación.

— Alberto Mira, De Sodoma a Chueca

== See also ==
- Coming out
- Don't ask, don't tell
- Riddle scale
- Gay-friendly
- Homonationalism
- Internalized homophobia
- Pink money
- Pink vote
- Pinkwashing
- Queerbaiting
- Rainbow capitalism
- Straight-acting
- Straightwashing
- Transphobia
