= John Samson =

John Samson may refer to:

- John K. Samson (born 1973), Canadian musician
- John Samson (filmmaker) (1946–2004), Scottish documentary filmmaker
