= Sissy hypno =

Pornography genre

Sissy hypno is an edited form of pornography that uses erotic hypnosis tropes, captions and looped audio to promote self-feminisation and submissive scripts in viewers. It often remixes mainstream pornography and transgender pornography with imperative, persuasive overlays that instruct compliance (for example, “be a good sissy”). Scholars link the genre to online “microporn” and remix practices, though many works are long-form videos rather than short GIF loops.

== Description ==
Sissy hypno typically overlays captions and/or narrated commands onto porn clips, drawing on film and stage hypnosis tropes to focus attention and persuade the viewer toward eroticised emasculation and feminisation. Common techniques include pulsing lights and spirals, rapid-cut edits, text-to-speech narration and binaural audio timed to instruction scripts.

== Production and distribution ==
Academic work describes sissy hypno as a remix form that appropriates professionally produced pornography and layers imperative text, audio and hypnotic visual tropes to produce suggestibility and hyperarousal. Researchers also note the emergence of hypno-specific platforms and tagging, which facilitate search and circulation.

== Public criticism ==
Sissy hypno is invoked in political and activist debates. A 2020 submission by WHRC to the UK Parliament’s Women and Equalities Committee described it as constructing “transgenderism,” reflecting public concern about persuasive framing and claimed effects. In the United States, media have covered right-wing commentary alleging that “sissy hypno” pornography can push men toward transgender identification; these claims are contested and presented without causal evidence.

== Scholarly debate and counter-positions ==
While much sissy-hypno content frames feminisation through humiliation scripts, researchers have identified a trans-affirming subgenre that reframes feminisation as self-realisation and gender self-authorship. TSQ scholarship argues that “sissy” remix cultures construct and contest transfeminine subjectivity, and cautions against reading the genre only through moral panic or static tropes. Historical work on porn hypnosis also emphasizes how “evil hypnotist” myths and brainwashing fears circulated long before the online genre, complicating simple claims of direct causal power.

== Research limitations ==
Available evidence is limited. The main qualitative study relies on a small, self-selected online sample and self-report. Although compulsivity, escapism and identity confusion appear repeatedly in participant accounts, establishing behavioral addiction or causality requires larger clinical and longitudinal research. Scholars also note that subgenres and audience motivations vary, which further complicates general claims about effects.
