= Fetishes (film) =

- DVD cover for Fetishes
- Directed by: Nick Broomfield
- Written by: Nick Broomfield
- Produced by: Nick Broomfield
- Starring: Mistress Beatrice; Mistress Catherine; Mistress Delilah; Mistress Natasha; Mistress Raven
- Cinematography: Christophe Lanzenberg
- Edited by: William C. Carruth
- Music by: Jaimie Muhoberac
- Distributed by: HBO
- Release date: 1996
- Running time: 84 min
- Language: English

Fetishes is a 1996 documentary by Nick Broomfield filmed at Pandora's Box, one of New York City's most luxurious SM/fetish parlours. The film contains interviews with professional dominatrices and their clients including the New York filmmaker Maria Beatty.

The documentary opens with black and white footage from an Irving Klaw film depicting models, including Bettie Page, wearing fetish attire. Nick Broomfield and his film crew then arrive at Pandora's Box on Manhattan's Fifth Avenue and are given a tour of the facility by Mistress Raven, including the dungeon and the medical room. The rest of the documentary consists of the following eight chapters:

- Slaves
- Mistresses
- Rubber fetish
- Wrestling fetish
- Corporal punishment
- Masochism
- Infantilism
- Socio-political fetishes

The film was produced in the United Kingdom and was originally made for HBO. It was released in the United States on DVD, (runtime 84 minutes, in colour), and more recently as part of Nick Broomfield's 'Documenting Icons' box set. A full, uncut version with additional archive material is also available in the UK.

== See also ==
- BDSM
- Fetishism
- Rubberist
- Maria Beatty
