= Pandora's Box (BDSM) =

Professional BDSM studio in New York City

Pandora's Box is a professional domination BDSM studio founded and managed for over a decade by Mistress Raven (who was at the time one of the most famous dominatrixes in America) in New York City. It has been the subject of the documentary Fetishes by Nick Broomfield, and a book by the photographic journalist Susan Meiselas, as well as the subject of numerous magazine and newspaper articles. In 2018, Meiselas photographed the dungeon once again for Garage Magazine, featuring some of its new, current Mistresses.

Its premises are a large basement facility in the Chelsea district of Manhattan. In 2006 it absorbed another domination studio, Den of Iniquity. It provides a wide range of BDSM activities, including fetish and roleplay. Like other New York domination studios, it does not permit sex on the premises.

== See also ==
- Dominatrix
