= Niang pao =

Chinese gender-based slur

- 娘炮
- Pronunciation: Niángpào
- Etymology: Literally "girlie guns / cannons"
- Meaning: Effeminate man
- Definition: Derogatory Chinese slang term for men perceived as effeminate
- Classification: Gender-based slur

Other terms
- Synonyms: "Sissy"

Demographics
- Native to: Chinese language and culture

Niang pao (Chinese: 娘炮) is a derogatory Chinese term for men perceived to be effeminate.

== Overview ==
Niang pao literally translates to "girlie guns / girlie cannons" but is more commonly translated as "sissy". It is generally used as an insult for effeminate men.

== History ==
The Chinese Communist Party (CCP) used the term in a 2018 Xinhua item intended to show its preference for the portrayal of virile Chinese men on the Internet.

In 2018, the official WeChat account of People’s Daily published a commentary denouncing “such derogatory phrases including ‘niangpao,’” and called for respect and tolerance of diversified aesthetics.

In 2019, the Chinese Academy of Social Sciences endorsed the conspiracy theory that the United States Central Intelligence Agency initiated the phenomenon with a deliberate "campaign to 'brainwash' Asian men" starting in 1962 in Japan with the Johnny & Associates talent agency.

On 2 September 2021, the CCP's Publicity Department announced that it would work on "comprehensive government" of the entertainment industry. This was a response to excesses in the industry, including violations of law (such as tax evasion) and public scandals (as when a major online talent program had voting based on QR codes in milk caps, and some fans bought bottles solely for the QR codes and wasted the bottled milk). The document stated that celebrity behavior that set a bad example for young people should be reined in, stating the need to curb "lawless and immoral entertainers" and "abnormal aesthetics." Also on 2 September, the National Radio and Television Administration (NRTA) issued a more concrete edict to prevent fandom behaviors deemed unhealthy: It stated that abnormal aesthetics included niangpao, which garnered media attention outside of China. The Guardian noted Chinese television programs Youth With You and Produce 101 as examples that were targeted.

== See also ==
- Little fresh meat
- LGBTQ rights in China
