= Straightwashing =

LGBT term

Straightwashing (also called hetwashing) is portraying LGBT (lesbian, gay, bisexual, transgender, asexual) or otherwise queer characters in fiction as heterosexual (straight) or altering information about historical figures to make their representation comply with heteronormativity or cisnormativity.

Straightwashing plays out through both historical revisionism and fiction.

Straightwashing is a relatively contemporary term which has increased in usage and acknowledgement in recent years. Despite an increasing presence of queer characters and storylines in American television, concerns about the straightwashing of queer characters and storylines persist. Common justifications for straightwashing include "producers' concerns about audience reactions and social norms and stereotypes regarding acceptable forms of queerness."

== Etymology ==
Etymologically, straightwashing is derived from the term 'whitewash', which alludes to "both censorship and the intersectional link with the discrimination faced by people of color."

== History ==
In the US, from 1930 to 1968, the Motion Picture Production Code caused major studios to eliminate gay characters or references from movies. The 1995 documentary The Celluloid Closet shows how some screenwriters and directors tried to use queer coding to subtly introduce gay characters, roles or themes, without it being noticed by censors, such as with Gore Vidal adding in a gay relationship in Ben-Hur.

The Motion Picture Production Code also led to the elimination of depictions of bisexuality in the film version of Truman Capote's novel Breakfast at Tiffany's. In the book, the male "artsy gigolo-writer" had "male and female clients", but in the movie, he is only shown with Holly Golightly. As well, the Code led to the elimination of a gay relationship in the film version of Tennessee Williams' play Cat on a Hot Tin Roof. In the play, Brick Pollit is depicted as being the lover of a family patriarch named Skipper. In the 1958 film version, the story arc of the gay relationship is replaced with a story of Skipper's frustration over his faded football career and a heterosexual sexless marriage.

Historical accounts of lesbian suffragettes Eva Gore-Booth and Esther Roper in some cases straightwash their sexuality, with the historian Gifford Lewis denying they were lesbian or queer in his biographies of them. Some letters by the composer Pyotr Ilyich Tchaikovsky in which he expressed his homosexual feelings remained censored and unpublished until 2018.

The New York Times published no more than two front-page articles per year that made any kind of references to gays from the end of World War II through until 1965. This number did not increase much over the following 20 years. It was rare that anything published was positive; most saw gays as security threats in the time of the Cold War. Gross (2001) pointed out gays' invisibility in this time period along with their concerns being publicly excluded.

In 1981, the AIDS crisis also received little media attention, even with the death rate rising rapidly. The New York Times did not mention AIDS until years after the outbreak and finally made the front page in 1983. Edward Alwood (1996), James Kinsella (1989) and Randy Shilts (1987) all commented on The Times' silence in relation to LGBT issues, especially the AIDS crisis. Coverage in the New York Times remained infrequent until the mid 1980s and then increased dramatically. This change in media is seen to be reflective of changes in society. Rock Hudson's death, Ronald Reagan's statements on AIDS in 1987, and President Bill Clinton's 1992 campaign proposal and the early 1993 congressional debate over the ban on lesbians and gays in the military all increased Times coverage of lesbian and gay issues.

== In fiction ==
Dragos Manea distinguishes between changing a queer character in fiction into a straight character, toning down the queer aspects of a character to make the character more acceptable to a heterosexual audience, removing queer referents from marketing posters or DVD covers, and changing the depiction of entire queer cultures or societies into a heterosexual version.

=== Film ===
The X-Men character Mystique is depicted as bisexual in the comic books, with her most prominent relationship was with Destiny, a female "fellow member of the Brotherhood of Mutants with whom she raised a child." However, within the X-Men films released by 20th Century Fox between 2000 and 2019, the character of Mystique, played by Rebecca Romijn (2000–2011) and Jennifer Lawrence (2011–2019), did not have any relationship or interest in another female character.

The 2015 film Stonewall was accused of ciswashing—the comparable concept for transgender people—for minimizing the roles of black and trans activists involved in the Stonewall riots.

In Stuart Richard's article "The Imitation Game and the 'straightwashing' of film", about the film The Imitation Game, Richards states that WW II code breaker "Alan Turing's [gay] sexuality is downplayed and used as a plot device", to show him as a "tragic hero and an eccentric, secretive man"; to make the film " 'safe' for a potentially conservative audience", the film only depicts him romantically with Joan Clarke (Keira Knightley).

=== Television ===
The character John Constantine, played by the actor Matt Ryan, from the NBC television series Constantine has been highly criticized for not displaying the same sexuality that was originally written in the DC comic book series, Constantine: Hellblazer. The TV executives decided that John Constantine's bisexuality was not to be included in the TV show and he was depicted as a straight male. However, when Ryan reprised the role on Legends of Tomorrow, the character was portrayed as bisexual.

The TV series Riverdale from The CW television network has been subject to criticisms about their depiction of one of the main characters Jughead Jones (played by American actor Cole Sprouse) as a straight male character. According to an interview with comicbook.com, Chip Zdarsky, the author of the Jughead comic book, stated that he wrote Jughead as an asexual character, while also noting the character (who debuted in 1941) had been featured in various incarnations over the years and was sometimes depicted as being heterosexual. Journalist Julia Alexander noted "many within the asexual community are upset about the development" on the television series.

The NBC TV drama Rise has been criticized for changing the basis of the production, a "real-life gay drama teacher" in a working class town, into a straight man; Out magazine calls it "cultural theft and [gay] erasure" that "should have been the story of a complicated LGBTQ hero".

The Japanese anime and manga series Sailor Moon is well known for several LGBTQIA+ characters who in the English translated version made by DiC and Cloverway, were altered to minimize their identity. Examples include the gay relationship of Kunzite (named Malachite in the English translation) and Zoisite, the latter of whom was edited to be a woman, as well as the lesbian relationship of Haruka Tenou as Sailor Uranus and Michiru Kaiou as Sailor Neptune. As well, several translations into other languages of the final season, Stars, also changed the Sailor Starlights, who take on a day role as part of a boy band named The Three Lights but who transform into females when they take on their superheroine persona.

The 2004 Japanese anime adaptation of the 1844 novel The Count of Monte Cristo by Alexandre Dumas, the character of Eugénie Danglars was altered to being the heterosexual love interest of Albert de Morcerf. This is in stark contrast to Eugénie's portrayal in the novel, who has a strong dislike for men, an equally strong desire for independence, and is implied to be a lesbian. Her girlfriend, Louise d'Armilly, was also left out of the adaptation.

=== Video games ===
Games such as Blizzard's World of Warcraft can be seen as inherently queer, since in the game both gender and sexuality are fluid and customizable. Here, the possibility of playing a non-straight main character is developmental. An example of this included a 2006 Valentine's Day in-game event where players could flirt with female and male NPCs for rewards, regardless of their character's gender. In 2010, the event was changed to reduce romantic overtones in the interactions.

The video game Undertale has "been straight-washed by many writers and fans", leading to the "erasure of the queerness found in Undertale and a recasting of the game as one that jibes with the interests of heterosexual male gamers".

Edmond Chang, an assistant professor of women's and gender studies at the University of Oregon, gave a speech at the University of California, Santa Barbara in 2016 entitled "Brown Skins, White Avatars: Racebending and Straightwashing in Digital Games". Chang states that video games such as Assassin's Creed and World of Warcraft "manipulate race and sexuality, reinforce stereotypes and sometimes lack diversity".

Heidi McDonald conducted a survey which statistically positioned BioWare as the industry leader of game romances, both gay and straight. BioWare's romance content has been evolving towards more inclusive romances for over 15 years. Females were more supportive of wanting more queer romance content than males; however, more than half of straight males were also supportive of this.

== In current affairs ==
After the mass shooting of gay men at the Pulse nightclub in Orlando, a gay club, some commentators did not refer to the LGBT victims, with the Republican National Committee denouncing "violence against any group of people simply for their lifestyle or orientation" and Senate Majority Leader Mitch McConnell not mentioning LGBT people in his statement. Activist John Becker stated that media are "straightwashing" the attack by "downplaying or even omitting the fact that the shooting was a crime of hatred against the LGBT community". However, it appeared perpetrator Omar Mateen selected Pulse based on the lack of security and not because it was a gay club. According to the FBI, "a complete picture of what motivated Mateen remains murky and may never be known since he was killed in a shootout with police and did not leave a manifesto."

During the 2018 Winter Olympics' Opening Ceremony, the television network NBC did not "mention or highlight a single out LGBTQ athlete in its three hours of Opening Ceremony coverage" according to journalist Cyd Zeigler, nor did the network acknowledge the only "publicly out American woman at the Games" or the first four "openly gay [men] at the Olympic Games".

Lotte Jeffs has criticized the straightwashing of the London's LGBT pride event, stating that rather than focus on recognizing the rights of queer, trans and non-heterosexual people, it has switched to making the LGBTQIA+ event "palatable for the masses" and for heterosexual people who will attend. She says that while big companies sponsor activities and include rainbow themes in their publicity materials, they hire straight celebrities to endorse products and brands for the event, with few "dar[ing] to use the words "gay", "lesbian", "trans" or "bi" when they show their support for Pride".

== See also ==
- Color-blind casting
- Liberal homophobia
- Pinkwashing (LGBTQ)
- Queer erasure
- Straight-acting
- Whitewashing in film
