= Masculinization (sexual activity) =

Submissive sexual practice

Masculinization or masculinisation, sometimes referred to as forced masculinization, is a practice within various dominance and submission or kink subcultures where a participant, often a woman or transgender male , assumes a masculine role. This can involve cross-dressing, adopting male mannerisms, or engaging in activities steriotypically associated with male gender roles, often as part of a consensual sexual or lifestyle practice. Masculinization can be an aspect of BDSM, where it serves purposes ranging from erotic humiliation to role reversal.

== Overview ==
Masculinization in the context of sexual activity is not about transitioning one's gender identity but rather about the temporary or situational adoption of masculine traits for sexual or fetishistic pleasure. Participants in masculinization might engage in:

Wearing clothing typically associated with men, such as suits, ties, or traditional male undergarments. Taking on roles like "the boss," "the mechanic," or any other stereotypically male occupation or persona.

The practice is often consensual and can be part of a broader BDSM or kink scene where power dynamics are explored through gender role reversal.

== Psychological and social aspects ==
Similarly to feminization, masculinization can serve as an outlet for exploring one's sexuality or identity in a safe, controlled environment. It might resonate with individuals who either challenge or wish to explore the boundaries of traditional gender roles:

For some, gender exploration of this fashion may be a way to delve into aspects of gender identity and expression that are otherwise suppressed due to societal norms. There can also be an aspect of humiliation where the participant might enjoy feeling as if they're being forced into a masculine role, playing into societal taboos or personal fantasies. Masculinization can invert power dynamics, where someone who is usually submissive assumes a more dominant role through masculine presentation and behaviors.

This practice can be seen as a form of identity play, where traditional gender roles are not just challenged but actively reversed for mutual pleasure or curiosity.

== Cultural and historical context ==
In many ancient cultures, activities such as warfare, religious rituals, leadership, or community defense were not associated with a gender, but rather with contextual needs, situated abilities, and relationships with the environment.

In some narratives or historical contexts, women's participation in religious rites, warfare, or leadership is framed as taking on "male roles," which reflects the logic of gender hierarchies rather than the realities of those practices. Similarly, within BDSM communities, masculinization is discussed as a symbolic and erotic narrative constructed inside gendered and hierarchical imaginaries, explored in literature and forums as part of specific fantasies and social frameworks.

== See also ==
- Cuckoldry
- Cuckqueanry
- Feminization (sexual activity)
- Sissy
