= John Sutcliffe (designer) =

British fashion designer

- Born: 1913; Hampstead, England
- Died: 1987 (aged 73–74)
- Occupations: Fashion designer, photographer
- Years active: 1957-1987
- Known for: AtomAge label
- Notable work: AtomAge magazine

John Sutcliffe (1913 – 1987) was a British fetish clothing designer and publisher of the fetish magazine AtomAge. He has also been credited with the invention of the catsuit.

== Early life ==
Sutcliffe was from Hampstead, England, and after serving as an RAF pilot, worked as an aircraft engineer. In the mid-1950s, he was divorced because his feelings about leather had been diagnosed as mental illness, which treatment had not altered, and he moved out of his family home. He began to work as a wedding photographer and used his earnings to purchase a motorcycle. Sutcliffe's interest in fashion design began with his creation of a waterproof leather motorcycle suit for a female rider, which has been reported as the invention of the first catsuit.

== Career ==
=== Fashion design ===
In 1957, after receiving orders for more leather motorcycle suits, Sutcliffe started AtomAge, a fetish clothing business he registered as a “manufacturer of weatherproofs for lady pillion riders”. Utilizing his engineering background, Sutcliffe developed techniques to create bespoke garments from materials including leather, rubber, and vinyl. He created a sewing needle for vinyl that improved the ability to stitch and work that material, and a method for attaching a muslin-type fabric to latex, which after that could be securely sewn. He also created a sewing machine specifically for leather and asked Singer to manufacture it, but as remembered by his friend Robert Henley, "Singer were so horrified, they called the police."

In the 1960s, the success of AtomAge prompted relocation from Hampstead to a larger workshop on Drury Lane in Covent Garden. Sutcliffe designed and produced leather costumes for a London production of Richard Wagner's Ring Cycle and spacesuits for science fiction films including the 1969 film Moon Zero Two. Sutcliffe also created the fleece-lined leather catsuit worn by Marianne Faithfull in the 1968 film The Girl on a Motorcycle, which has also been credited to Jeanne Lanvin.

Under the AtomAge label, Sutcliffe constructed a leather costume prototype that had been designed by artist Allen Jones for pre-production of the 1971 film A Clockwork Orange. Producer Mike Wallington later noticed this costume in an art book and, with director John Samson, contacted Sutcliffe and ultimately featured him in the 1977 documentary Dressing for Pleasure. Sutcliffe also connected the filmmakers with other people in the London fetish scene, and the documentary included footage filmed at Sex, a boutique run by designer Vivienne Westwood and her then-partner Malcolm McLaren. This boutique operated between 1974 and 1976 and specialized in clothing that defined the look of the punk movement, much of which was inspired by Sutcliffe's designs and photography.

=== Publishing ===
Sutcliffe published the first AtomAge clothing catalogue in 1965 and expanded it into a fetish magazine, also titled AtomAge, in 1972. The magazine has been called the "underground bible of leather, rubber and vinyl fetish wear throughout the 1970s" and documented Britain's S/M scene. The main run of the magazine ended in 1980, when Sutcliffe created three topically specialized spinoff magazines respectively focused on rubber, bondage, and fetish fashion more broadly.

In 1982 Sutcliffe published a novel by Jim Dickson called The Story Of Gerda, about bondage and fetishism. A copy of it was sent to the police, and to keep from being prosecuted for obscenity Sutcliffe agreed to have all AtomAge stock and printing plates destroyed, in addition to paying a fine. In 1983, Sutcliffe moved the company to Park Royal, where he printed a few additional issues of the AtomAge magazines with the support of friends and clients, but circulation and business did not recover. He died at his desk in 1987.

== Legacy ==
Sutcliffe was an influence on the leather and latex catsuits worn by Emma Peel in The Avengers. These catsuits were directly inspired by Sutcliffe's AtomAge designs; an early leather prototype included a full face mask and hood, which were removed for production.

Sutcliffe's work has been credited as inspiration by artists including electronic musician Fever Ray and fashion label Kwaidan Editions.

In 2023 he was inducted into the Leather Hall of Fame.

== Bibliography ==
- Sutcliffe, John (1974). The Masters And Mistresses Association Handbook.
