= AtomAge =

British fetish magazine

- Cover of the second issue (March 1973)
- Categories: Fetish magazine
- Founder: John Sutcliffe
- First issue: 1972
- Final issue: 1980
- Country: United Kingdom
- Language: English

AtomAge was a fetish magazine published in Britain by the clothes designer John Sutcliffe in the 1970s as an offshoot of his AtomAge fetish clothing business. The magazine has been called the "underground bible of leather, rubber and vinyl fetish wear throughout the 1970s" and documented Britain's S/M scene.

== History ==
The first AtomAge brand clothing catalogue was published in 1965. With the encouragement of friends and collaborators, Sutcliffe expanded upon the catalogue by launching the AtomAge magazine in 1972.

Early issues both showcased Sutcliffe's designs through photographs and enabled fetishists, who at the time were typically otherwise isolated, to connect through articles and reader correspondence. Throughout the magazine's publication, content ranged from articles about the making and care of rubber, latex, PVC and leather clothing to documentation of related fetish activities. In 1976, bondage-related content was moved into a separate supplement, with the main magazine staying focused on clothing and lifestyle topics.

After 32 issues, the original AtomAge magazine ended in 1980.

=== Spinoffs ===
When Sutcliffe closed down the original AtomAge, he launched three more specialized magazines focused on leather and fetish fashion, bondage, and rubber fetishism respectively. These spinoffs were published until 1985.

== Reception ==
AtomAge was primarily available through mail order and circulation was limited by small print runs, with fewer than one thousand copies of the first issue published. However, readers formed an hours-long line at the first bookstore to stock the magazine. AtomAge contributed to shifting cultural attitudes toward the normalization of pornography and kink in Great Britain in the 1970s by allowing its readers to share their own photographs and stories depicting fetish outfits as mundane and "suburban". At the same time, punk fashion designer Vivienne Westwood drew inspiration from the designs showcased in AtomAge as she incorporated latex into her own early work.

In November 1983, the premises of AtomAge were raided by police, who seized back issues, current stock, and printing plates. To avoid prosecution for obscenity, Sutcliffe agreed to destroy all seized stock and plates, which both reduced circulation and prevented reprints. AtomAge is now considered an "extremely rare" magazine by collectors.

2010 saw the publication of English writer Jonny Trunk's Dressing For Pleasure: The Best Of AtomAge 1972-1980, a comprehensive pictorial retrospective of both the magazine and company. This republication of the content of AtomAge revived interest in the magazine and influenced the work of several artists: Electronic musician Fever Ray cited the photography and DIY culture documented in AtomAge as major inspirations for her 2017 album Plunge. Fashion label Kwaidan Editions drew inspiration from AtomAge for its spring/summer 2018 and fall 2021 ready-to-wear collections.
