= Feminization (sexual activity) =

Submissive sexual practice

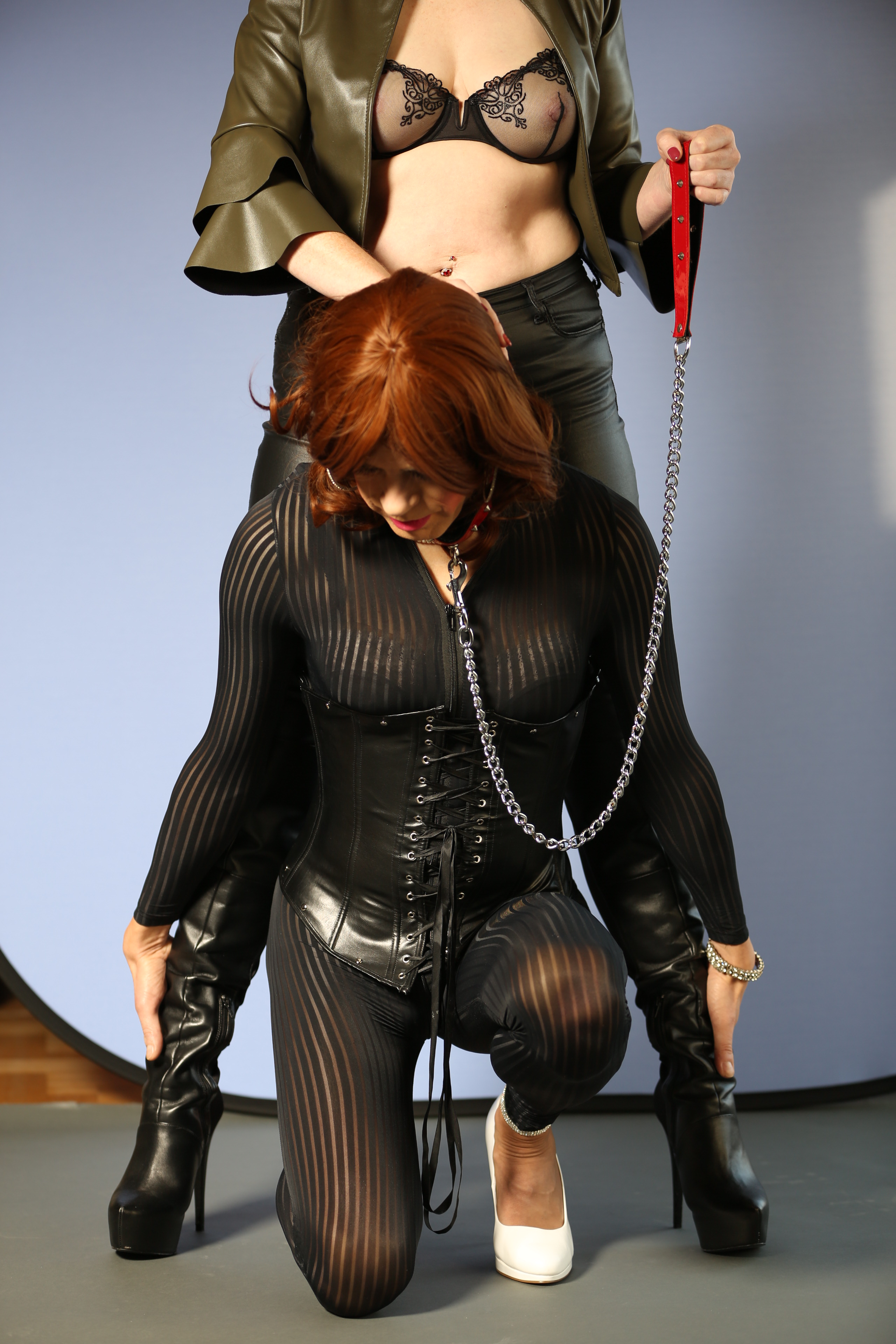
A dominant woman and a submissive man

Feminization or feminisation, sometimes forced feminization (shortened to forcefem or forced femme), and also known as sissification, is a practice in dominance and submission or kink subcultures, involving reversal of gender roles and making a submissive male take on a feminine role, which includes cross-dressing. Subsets of the practice include "sissy training" and variations thereof, where the submissive male is "trained" to become feminine.

Feminization as a sexual fetish is different from being a transgender woman, and the submissive partners engaging in it are typically cisgender men.

== Practice ==
Feminization is a practice in dominance and submission or kink subcultures, which involves reversing gender roles: a submissive partner – typically a man – takes on a feminine role, often for humiliation-based sexual pleasure. This may include them cross-dressing in feminine clothing such as lingerie, wearing makeup, jewelry, and perfume, acting in a feminine manner, getting referred to by a feminine name, having anal sex as the receptive partner, wearing prosthetic breasts, or tucking.

Participant in feminization often role-play scenarios together, based around the submissive partner's femininity or feminine clothes. Common scenarios include being caught in the act of trying on panties or lipstick; being discovered to be wearing frilly lingerie under one's clothes; being a princess; being treated like a helpless "damsel in distress"; or being hired as a woman for a female-coded job like a nurse, cheerleader, sex worker, or businesswoman. HuffPost described one dominatrix's sissification sessions as involving humiliating the submissive by "parading them around" in high heels, make-up, and lingerie, and another dominatrix as "cheerleading" men into exploring femininity.

Despite the term "forced" feminization – as the role-played scenario may involve that the submissive partner is feminized against their will – it is a fantasy that is agreed upon by its participants. Whereas not all participants are interested in the BDSM aspects of feminization, and only enjoy dressing up, it may also include things such as spanking, pegging, bondage, and humiliation such as making fun of the submissive for having a small and soft penis, or referring to it as a clitoris. The feminized partner is sometimes called a "sissy" if male, and may be said to have been "sissified".

=== Sissy training and variations ===
A subset of feminization is "sissy training", wherein the dominant partner slowly trains the submissive in being a sissy over time, having him take on "ultra-feminine" behaviors and participate in feminine activities. As part of this, it is common for the sissy to cross-dress; to shave his body, including his genitals; wear make-up; and wear women's underwear, to appear more womanly. Sissy training involves non-sexual activities, such as applying make-up or cleaning the house, as well as sexual ones.

A further subset is "sissy maid training", a common scenario, where the sissy takes on the role of a maid, taking care of housework or serving drinks and food at a party while behaving submissively and wearing an often frilly and revealing maid uniform, such as a French maid or rubber maid dress. The dominant partner in a sissy maid training scenario, overseeing the sissy's housework, may role-play punishing him through spanking, humiliation or bondage, whether the infraction was real or made up; a reward for good behavior might be allowing the submissive to orgasm.

Another common subset is "slut training", where the submissive partner is wears "slutty" feminine clothing that may reveal a lot of bare skin and show off the sissy's curves, while being teased or chided for supposedly being promiscuous or overly sexual. The training involves making the often shy or embarrassed sissy overcome those emotions, shifting his mindset to instinctively act more provocatively and uninhibitedly. The training may involve provocative poses, such as spreading one's buttocks or exposing one's genitals, and learning to instinctively assume certain such positions in certain contexts.

== Society ==
According to a HuffPost feature interviewing sex workers, including dominatrixes and escorts, forced feminization is one of the most common sexual fantasies among sex workers' clients: one dominatrix said that a vast majority of her clients want to be sissified. In Danielle Lindemann's book Dominatrix, about a third of a sample of 305 sex worker clients were interested in being made to cross-dress. The fantasy is to a large degree practiced by heterosexual, cisgender men as the submissive partners, although Vice noted that there were also bisexual and pansexual men present at a feminization meet-up they reported on, as well as some genderfluid and transgender people. In slut training scenarios, the submissive partner is most commonly not a man, however, but a woman. The dominant partner may likewise be of any gender; in maid training scenarios, the dominant is typically a woman.

Kinkly describes the appeal of feminization as coming from the societal pressure on men to be traditionally masculine, and how being feminine can give men a feeling of guilt. When a man who is drawn to femininity does things considered feminine as part of a scenario where he is supposedly "forced" to do them, this may provide an outlet for his feelings while also giving him a relief of the guilt, since it within the fantasy is an external force that caused him to do it. Because of this stigma, it may still be difficult for either partner to bring up the subject of feminization, however, not knowing how the other will react. Some people also use feminization as a way to explore their sexuality. As a BDSM role-play practice, being feminized may appeal to the submissive through making them feel vulnerable and reinforcing their role. Dominant partners may enjoy feminization for getting to bring out the submissive's female persona, or for getting to erotically humiliate them for their lack of masculinity.

In her book Fetish Sex, writer Violet Blue says that although the kink may seem like it is devaluing women from an outsider's perspective, submissive partners engaging in it often have a lot of respect for women. In Gender Reversals and Gender Cultures, Sabrina P. Ramet writes that although the fantasy may seem contradictory in its treatment of femininity as a source of humiliation, since it is often combined with femdom – as one could assume that the submissive's feminine clothing would be a symbol of the female superiority within a femdom–feminization role-play – the two fantasies are independent even within the role-play, with the humiliation coming from the cultural taboo of wearing women's clothing as a man.

Feminization, as a sexual fetish, is not the same as being a transgender woman. According to Ana Valens, writing for The Daily Dot, forced feminization is still a common fantasy among trans women, however, because of how trans women's stigmatized need to be women, through feminization fantasies, can be met before a trans woman has even admitted to having that need.

=== Cultural depictions ===
Visual artist Río Sofia created a series of self-portraits in 2019 themed around forced feminization, influenced by the Forced Womanhood! magazine and sharing its name. Feminization was featured in an episode of the television drama series Law & Order: Criminal Intent, which was described as an unrealistic portrayal by author Helen Boyd in her book My Husband Betty.

== See also ==
- Cuckoldry
- Cuckqueanry
- Chastity belt
- Gynecocracy (1893), by Viscount Ladywood (Pseudonym)
- Masculinization (sexual activity)
- Sissy
