= Pink vote =

Electoral influence of the LGBTQ community

Pink vote (also called the lavender vote) are the votes cast by gays and lesbians, typically considered a voting bloc. Most prevalent in Britain, the concept has already spread to US, where gays and lesbians are substantially more likely to vote Democratic, and Canada with many other countries like South Africa and Australia starting to acknowledge it. The Pink Vote is now well-established across countries in Western Europe, including Germany with gay and lesbian voters being notably more inclined to vote for social democratic parties over right-wing parties and to be far more supportive of EU integration. In addition, there are socio-political movements and political groups formed by LGBT people who are linked to political parties.

== United Kingdom ==
According to the Office for National Statistics (ONS), 1.00% of the total population in UK is homosexual and so, 480,000 people consider themselves gay or lesbian as of 2010.

Political parties in Britain now aim at the pink vote bank and leave no stone unturned to persuade the homosexual community to vote in their favour.

The significance of pink vote has increased considerably with the changing times. Charles Kennedy of The Liberal Democrats pitched for the "pink vote" and even promised a package of ways to boost homosexual rights.

Pink voters in the UK tend to vote for socially liberal "left wing" parties that have, at least traditionally, been more support of LGBT rights in the United Kingdom. In the 2017 United Kingdom general election, 51.6% of LGBT voters opted for the Labour Party (UK) while only a small minority of 12.7% voted for the Conservative Party (UK). LGBTQ+ British voters are more likely to vote for the left -- parties like Labour or the Greens -- regardless of their social class and even do so when they come from right-wing homes where their parents voted for the Tories.

== United States ==
According to a research report by Gallup, Americans interviewed estimated the gay population of the US to be 23.2% of the overall population. However, the most recent poll showed that 7.6% of Americans identify as LGBT, including almost 30% of generation Z adults. This percentage does play a big role in the elections and political parties try every way to attract these pink voters. LGBT Democrats (linked to the Democratic Party) and Log Cabin Republicans (linked to the Republican Party) are two of the largest American political groups advocated to LGBT rights issues in politics. An April 2024 Gallup poll found that 83% of lesbian, gay and bisexual women identify with the Democratic Party and only 12% identify with the Republican Party. Likewise, 83% of gay and bisexual men identify with the Democratic Party and only 17% identify with the Republican Party.

An NBC News exit poll for the 2024 presidential election found that Kamala Harris garnered more support from LGBTQ voters than any other presidential candidate in history, with 86% of LGBTQ voters backing Harris and 12% backing Donald Trump - a margin 15% larger than the edge Joe Biden had over Trump in 2020.

== Changing times ==
With the visible impact of the pink vote in Britain, Canada's political scenario also caught up with the pink vote politics. This new idea has also been a topic of debate in the Australia's political system.

There are countries like South Africa where the pink vote is yet to acquire such importance and the homosexual community is yet to be given any added importance in elections.

Recent polling of LGBT voters has revealed queer voting habits to be more complex than previously thought.

== In focus ==
There have also been debates about the impact of pink votes and their existence in politics. In spite of such debates, fever of the pink vote even caught up Oscars as well.

== See also ==
- Pink money
