= Danielle Lindemann =

American author and sociologist

- Education: PhD
- Alma mater: Columbia University, Princeton University
- Writing career
- Genres: Gender, sexuality, popular culture, deviance
- Notable work: True Story: What Reality TV Says About Us
- Website: daniellelindemann.com

Danielle Lindemann is an American author, and professor of sociology at Lehigh University.

== Early life and education ==
She received her BA in English and Creative Writing from Princeton University in 2002 and her PhD in sociology from Columbia University in 2010. Lindemann lives in Princeton, New Jersey, with her husband and two daughters.

== Career ==
=== Dominatrix: Gender, Eroticism, and Control in the Dungeon ===
Lindemann's first book, Dominatrix: Gender, Eroticism, and Control in the Dungeon, is based on her doctoral dissertation. Drawing on in-depth interviews with professional dominatrices, Lindemann argues that this seemingly "deviant" erotic world has much to teach us about gender dynamics, sexuality, and power in our everyday lives.

=== True Story: What Reality TV Says About Us ===
True Story: What Reality TV Says About Us was published in February 2022 by Farrar, Straus & Giroux. The book is "Sociology 101" through the lens of reality TV; each chapter illuminates the central theories and research within a particular sociological realm (e.g., small group dynamics, family, childhood, class, race, gender, and sexuality).
