= John Samson (filmmaker) =

Scottish independent filmmaker (1946–2004)

John Samson (1946–2004) was a Scottish independent filmmaker.

Samson was born in Ayrshire and grew up in Paisley. After leaving school at the age of 16 he worked as an apprentice in Clydeside; here he became involved with the trade unionist movement. He also joined the Anarchist movement, and participated in a number of strikes and demonstrations. He left his apprenticeship and enrolled in the Glasgow School of Art in 1963; later, after learning photography and the guitar, he began making documentary films. His first film, Charlie, gained him a scholarship to the National Film School.

Samson was not a prolific artist, producing only five films over an eight-year career. He won a BAFTA and a Peabody in 1984 for The Skin Horse, and produced a documentary on the darts player Eric Bristow entitled Arrows. His other films were Britannia, a study of train enthusiasts, Dressing for Pleasure, which examines fetishism, and Tattoo a film about tattoo artistry. Samson's films did not generally use narration.
