= Effeminacy =

Feminine qualities in boys or men

Effeminacy or male femininity is the embodiment of feminine traits in boys or men, particularly those considered untypical of men or masculinity. These traits include roles, stereotypes, behaviors, and appearances that are socially associated with girls and women. Throughout Western civilization, men considered effeminate have faced prejudice and discrimination. Gay men are often stereotyped as being effeminate, and vice versa. However, femininity, masculinity, and other forms of gender expression are independent of sexual orientation.

== Terminology ==
Effeminate comes from Latin effeminātus, from the factitive prefix ex- (from ex 'out') and femina 'woman'; it means 'made feminine, unmasculine, emasculated, weakened'.

Other vernacular words for effeminacy include: pansy, pretty boy, molly, nancy boy, nelly, girly boy, sissy, pussy, tomgirl, femboy, roseboy, baby, and girl (when applied to a boy or, especially, adult man). The word effete similarly implies effeminacy or over-refinement, but comes from the Latin term effetus meaning 'having given birth; exhausted', from ex- and fetus 'offspring'. The term tomgirl, meaning a girlish boy, comes from an inversion of tomboy, meaning a boyish girl. The term girly boy comes from a gender-inversion of girly girl.

The Chinese term for 'girly men' is niang pao. In September 2021, the Associated Press reported that the mainland Chinese government has banned effeminate men from appearing in television commercials. The Chinese government instructed broadcasters to stop showing "sissy men".

== History ==
=== Ancient Greece and Rome ===
==== Greece ====
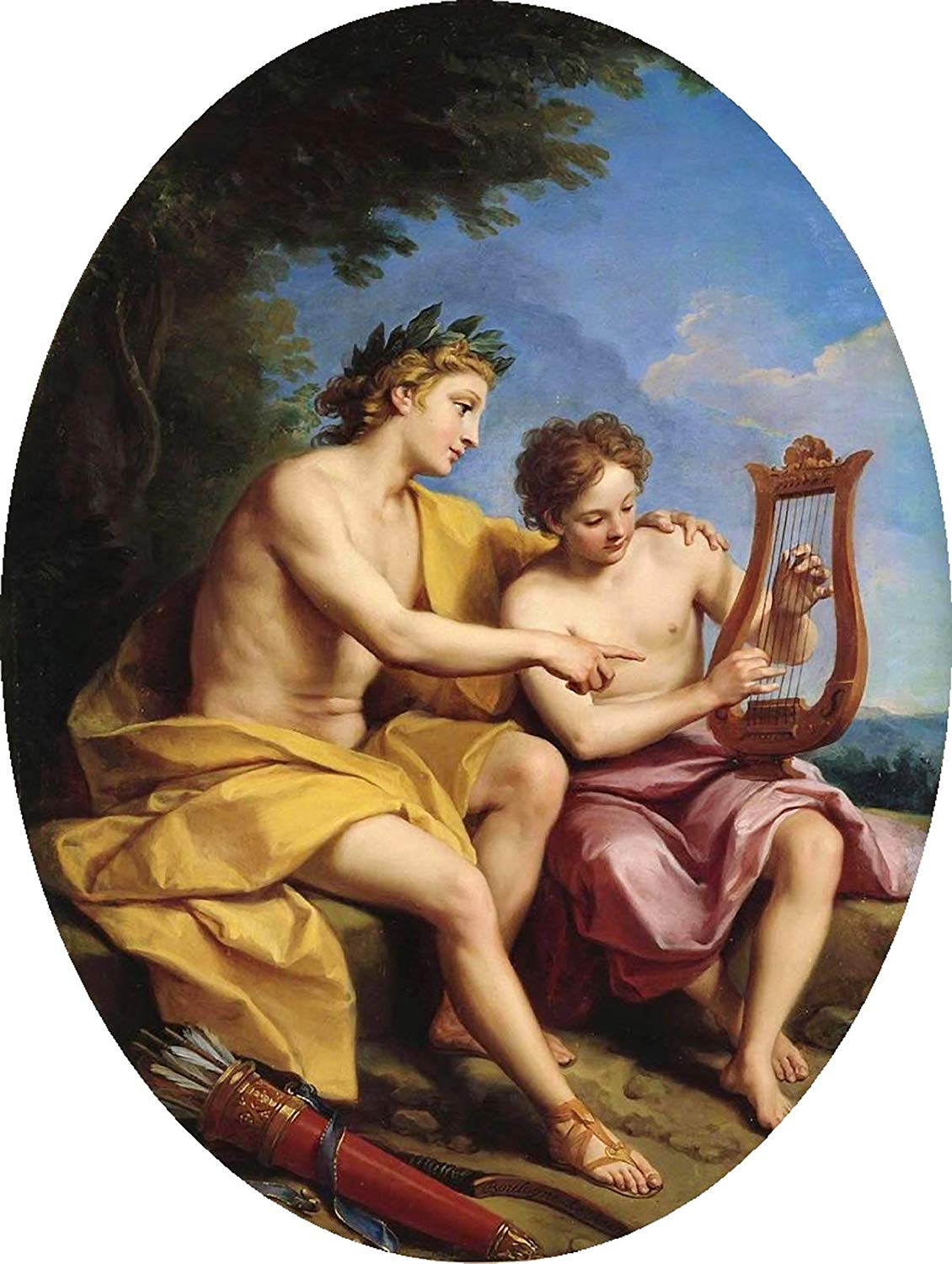
The Younger Apollo Teaching Hyacinth to Play Lyra by Louis de Boullogne

Greek historian Plutarch recounts that Periander, the tyrant of Ambracia, asked his "boy", "Aren't you pregnant yet?" in the presence of other people, causing the boy to kill him in revenge for being treated as if effeminate or a woman (Amatorius 768F).

When Aeschines was accused of treason by Athenians Timarchus and Demosthenes in 346 BC, he brought a counter suit claiming Timarchus had prostituted himself to (or been "kept" by) other men (Against Timarchus). He also attributed Demosthenes' nickname Batalos ("arse") to his "unmanliness and kinaidiā" and frequently commented on his "unmanly and womanish temper", even criticising his clothing: "If anyone took those dainty little coats and soft shirts off you... and took them round for the jurors to handle, I think they'd be quite unable to say, if they hadn't been told in advance, whether they had hold of a man's clothing or a woman's."

In ancient Koine Greek, the word for effeminate is κίναιδος kinaidos (cinaedus in its Latinized form), or μαλακός malakoi: a man "whose most salient feature was a supposedly 'feminine' love of being sexually penetrated by other men":

A cinaedus is a man who cross-dresses or flirts like a girl. Indeed, the word's etymology suggests an indirect sexual act emulating a promiscuous woman. This term has been borrowed from the Greek kinaidos (which may itself have come from a language of Ionian Greeks of Asia Minor, primarily signifying a purely effeminate dancer who entertained his audiences with a tympanum or tambourine in his hand, and adopted a lascivious style, often suggestively wiggling his buttocks in such a way as to suggest anal intercourse....The primary meaning of cinaedus never died out; the term never became a dead metaphor."

The late Greek (Note: possibly c. fourth century) Erôtes ("Loves", "Forms of Desire", "Affairs of the Heart"), preserved with manuscripts by Lucian, contains a debate "between two men, Charicles and Callicratidas, over the relative merits of women and boys as vehicles of male sexual pleasure." Callicratidas, "far from being effeminised by his sexual predilection for boys... Callicratidas's inclination renders him hypervirile... Callicratidas's sexual desire for boys, then, makes him more of a man; it does not weaken or subvert his male gender identity but rather consolidates it." In contrast, "Charicles' erotic preference for women seems to have had the corresponding effect of effeminising him: when the reader first encounters him, for example, Charicles is described as exhibiting 'a skillful use of cosmetics, so as to be attractive to women.'"

==== Rome ====
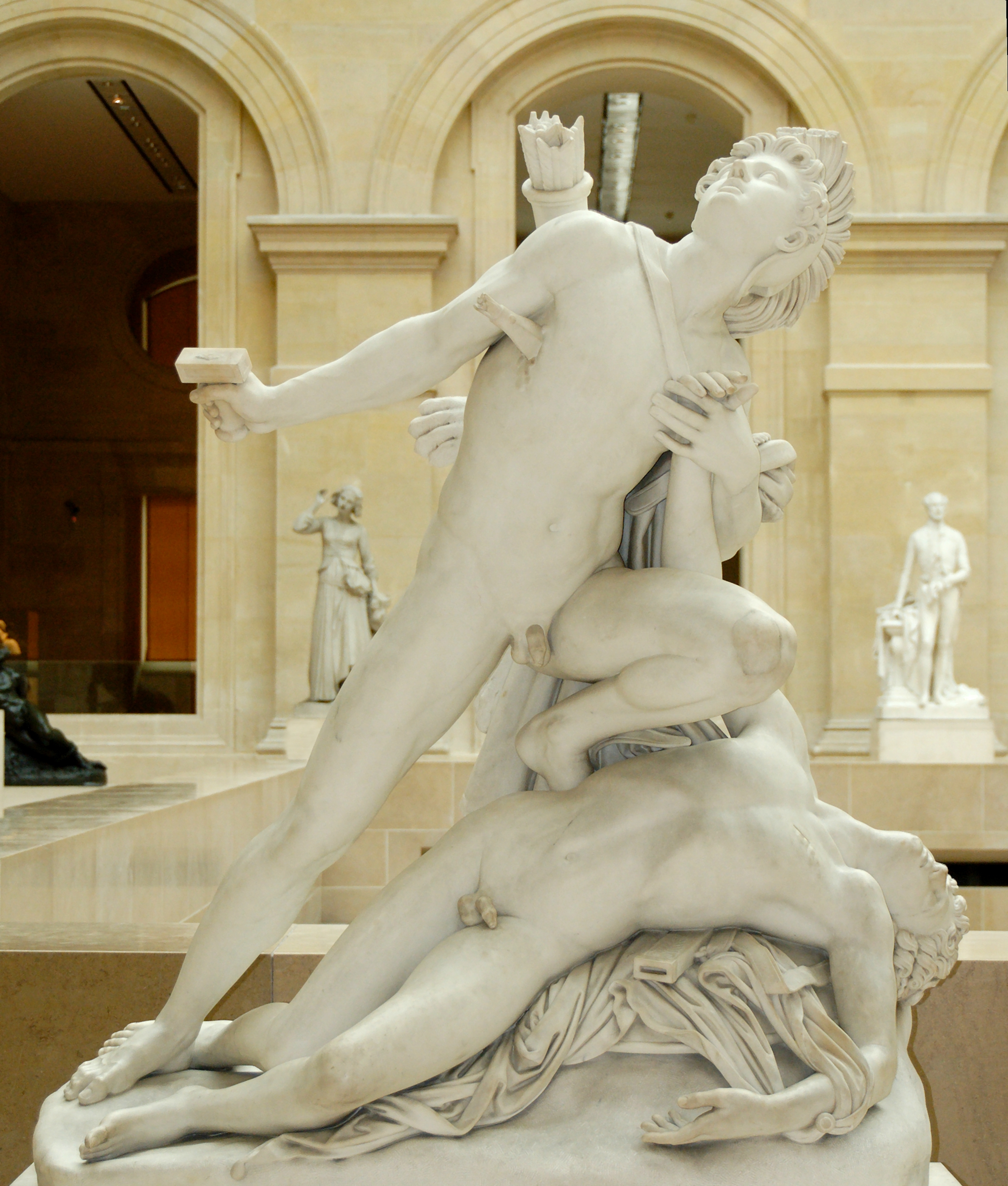
In Virgil's tale of the two young lovers, Nisus and Euryalus, Euryalus was "beautiful" and had a close relationship with his mother, while Nisus was fast and skilled with weaponry.

Over-refinement, fine clothes and other possessions, the company of women, certain trades, and too much fondness with women were all deemed effeminate traits in Roman society. Taking an inappropriate sexual position, passive or "bottom", in same-gender sex was considered effeminate and unnatural. Touching the head with a finger and wearing a goatee were also considered effeminate.

Roman consul Scipio Aemilianus questioned one of his opponents, P. Sulpicius Galus: "For the kind of man who adorns himself daily in front of a mirror, wearing perfume; whose eyebrows are shaved off; who walks around with plucked beard and thighs; who when he was a young man reclined at banquets next to his lover, wearing a long-sleeved tunic; who is fond of men as he is of wine: can anyone doubt that he has done what cinaedi are in the habit of doing?"

Roman orator Quintilian described, "The plucked body, the broken walk, the female attire," as "signs of one who is soft [mollis] and not a real man."

For Roman men masculinity also meant self-control, even in the face of painful emotions, illnesses, or death. Cicero says, "There exist certain precepts, even laws, that prohibit a man from being effeminate in pain," and Seneca adds, "If I must suffer illness, it will be my wish to do nothing out of control, nothing effeminately."

Emperor/philosopher Julian the Apostate, in his Against the Galileans, wrote: ''Why are the Egyptians more intelligent and more given to crafts, and the Syrians unwarlike and effeminate, but at the same time intelligent, hot-tempered, vain and quick to learn?''

In his Commentaries on the Gallic Wars, Julius Caesar wrote that the Belgians were the bravest of all Gauls because "merchants least frequently resort to them, and import those things which tend to effeminate the mind".

Emperor Marcus Aurelius evidently considered effeminacy an undesirable trait, but it is unclear what or who was being referred to.

== Gay men ==
=== United States ===
In the United States, boys are often homosocial, and gender role performance determines social rank. While gay boys receive the same enculturation, they are less compliant. Martin Levine summarizes: "Harry (1982, 51–52), for example, found that 42 percent of his gay respondents were 'sissies' during childhood. Only 11 percent of his heterosexual samples were gender-role nonconformists. Bell, Weinberg, and Hammersmith (1981, 188) reported that half of their male homosexual subjects practised gender-inappropriate behaviour in childhood. Among their heterosexual men, the rate of noncompliance was 25 percent. Saghir and Robins (1973, 18) found that one-third of their gay man respondents conformed to gender role dictates. Only 3 percent of their heterosexual men deviated from the norm." Thus effeminate boys, or sissies, are physically and verbally harassed (Saghir and Robins, 1973, 17–18; Bell, Weinberg, and Hammersmith 1981, 74–84), causing them to feel worthless and "de-feminise".

Before the Stonewall riots, inconsistent gender role performance had been noticed among gay men: "They have a different face for different occasions. In conversations with each other, they often undergo a subtle change. I have seen men who appeared to be normal suddenly smile roguishly, soften their voices, and simper as they greeted homosexual friends [...] Many times I saw these changes occur after I had gained a homosexual's confidence and he could safely risk my disapproval. Once as I watched a luncheon companion become an effeminate caricature of himself, he apologized, 'It is hard to always remember that one is a man.'" Before Stonewall, "closet" culture accepted homosexuality as effeminate behaviour, and thus emphasized camp, drag, and swish, including an interest in fashion and decorating. Masculine gay men were marginalised and formed their own communities, such as the leather subculture, and/or wore clothes that were commonly associated with working-class individuals, such as sailor uniforms.

There is a definite prejudice towards men who use femininity as part of their palette; their emotional palette, their physical palette. Is that changing? It's changing in ways that don't advance the cause of femininity. I'm not talking frilly-laced pink things or Hello Kitty stuff. I'm talking about goddess energy, intuition and feelings. That is still under attack, and it has gotten worse.

— RuPaul

After Stonewall, "clone culture" became dominant and effeminacy is now marginalised. One indicator of this is a definite preference shown in personal ads for masculine-behaving men. The avoidance of effeminacy by men, including gay ones, has been linked to possible impedance of personal and public health. Regarding HIV/AIDS, masculine behaviour was stereotyped as being unconcerned about safe sex practices while engaging in promiscuous sexual behaviour. Early reports from New York City indicated that more women had themselves tested for HIV/AIDS than men. David Halperin compares "universalising" and "minoritising" notions of gender deviance: "'Softness' either may represent the specter of potential gender failure that haunts all normative masculinity, an ever-present threat to the masculinity of every man, or it may represent the disfiguring peculiarity of a small class of deviant individuals."

The term effeminiphobia (sometimes effemiphobic, as used by Randy P. Conner) was coined by Will Fellows to describe strong anti-effeminacy. Michael Bailey coined the similar term femiphobia to describe the ambivalence gay men and culture have about effeminate behaviour in 1995. Gay author Tim Bergling popularized the term sissyphobia in Sissyphobia: Gay Men and Effeminate Behavior, although it was used before. Transgender writer and biologist Julia Serano has coined the similar term effemimania. Feminist sociologist Rhea Ashley Hoskin suggests that these terms can be understood as relating to a larger construct of femmephobia, or "prejudice, discrimination, or antagonism directed against someone who is perceived to identify, embody, or express femininely and toward people and objects gendered femininely." Since the 2000s, Peter Hennen's cultural analysis of gay masculinities has found effeminacy to be a "historically varying concept deployed primarily as a means of stabilising a given society's concept of masculinity and controlling the conduct of its men based upon the repudiation of the feminine".

== Modern context ==
Femboy (alternatively spelled femboi) is a modern slang term used to refer to a male who displays traditionally feminine characteristics, such as wearing dresses, skirts, and/or thigh-highs. It is a portmanteau of feminine and boy. The term femboy emerged by at least the 1990s and gained traction online, used in both sexual and non-sexual contexts. Recently, femboys have become increasingly visible due to their inclusion in popular media, and trends such as "Femboy Friday" and "Femboy Hooters". These trends involve self-identifying femboys posting images of themselves in online groups and forums, dressed in feminine clothing or a form of cosplay. Cosplay has become exceedingly popular among online femboys, usually cosplaying female, non-binary, or effeminate male characters.

While the term can be used as a slur towards trans women, it is also used as a positive/self-describing term within the LGBT community.

== See also ==
- Androgyny
- Bakla
- Bishōnen
- En femme
- Ergi
- Gender bender
- Gender variance
- Genderqueer
- Gynomorph
- Metrosexual
- Otokonoko
- Sex and gender distinction
- Social construction of gender
- Third gender
- Two-spirit
