= Sissy =

Pejorative slur used against effeminate boys and men

Sissy (derived from sister), (Note: Alternatively cissy in Australian English.) also sissy baby, sissy boy, sissy man, sissy pants, etc., is a pejorative term for a boy or man who does not demonstrate masculine traits, is effeminate and shows possible signs of fragility. Generally, sissy implies a lack of courage, strength, athleticism, coordination, testosterone, libido, and stoicism. A man might also be considered a sissy for being interested in stereotypically feminine hobbies or employment (e.g., being fond of fashion), displaying effeminate behavior, being unathletic or being homosexual.

Sissy is also the male counterpart of tomboy (a female with traits or interests of the opposite gender), but carries more strongly negative connotations. Research published in 2015 suggests that the terms are asymmetrical in their power to stigmatize: sissy is almost always pejorative and conveys greater severity, while tomboy rarely causes as much concern but also elicits pressure to conform to social expectations. In some communities, especially ones whose members are prominently part of the later generations of Millennial and Generation Z, highly effeminate males are referred to as "femboys" (feminine boy), a term which aims to provide a way to refer to effeminate males without negative connotations.

== Diminutive term ==
Sissy is also a term of endearment used as a diminutive for the female given name Cecilia. Its usage as a diminutive for Cecilia dates back to at least the late 19th century. Its usage is explicitly called out in Charles Dickens' Hard Times: For These Times. However, it has since fallen out of favor, coinciding with the rise in its usage as a pejorative.

== History and usage ==
The term sissy has historically been used among school children as a "relentlessly negative" insult, implying immaturity and gender or sexual deviance. It has been identified as sexist in guidance issued to schools in the United Kingdom and described as "just as unacceptable as racist and homophobic language." The terms gender creative, pink boy, and tomgirl have been suggested as polite alternatives. The Japanese word bishōnen (literally "beautiful youth") and the Korean word kkonminam (literally "flower boy") are also polite terms for a man or boy with gentle or feminine attributes.

The word sissy in its original meaning of "sister" entered American English around 1840–1850 and acquired its pejorative meaning around 1885–1890; the verb sissify appeared in 1900–1905. In comparison, the word tomboy is approximately three centuries older, dating to 1545–1555.

By the 1930s, "there was no more damning insult than to be called a sissy" and the word was widely used by American football coaches and sports writers to disparage rival teams and encourage ferocious player behavior. The use of the word sissy was "ubiquitous" among delinquent American youth of the 1930s; the term was used to provoke boys to join gangs, demean boys who violated group norms, force compliance with the mandates of masculinity, and justify violence (including sexual violence) against younger and weaker children. Good students were taunted as sissies and clothing styles associated with higher social classes were demeaned as sissified. Among members of a Detroit, Michigan youth gang in 1938–39, sissy was "the ultimate slur" used to tease and taunt other boys, as a rationalization for violence against rivals, and as an excuse for not observing the dicta of middle-class decorum and morality.

By the late 1980s, some men began to reclaim the term sissy for themselves. The spelling variation cissy was used in British English, at least prior to the mid 1970s. In the United States, the Comedy Central television series South Park inverted its meaning in a 2014 episode titled "The Cissy", which lampooned the controversy over transgender students' use of school restrooms; in the episode, a restroom initially designated for use by transgender students is later re-designated as "the cissy bathroom" for use by transphobic cisgender students.

== Judicial Usage ==
Antonin Scalia, in his memorable article Judicial Deference to Administrative Interpretations of Law, famously stated that "[administrative] law is not for sissies."

Beverly McLachlin, then Chief Justice of Canada, quotes Scalia in a 2015 article: "[finding] a way through the barbed and occluded thicket of administrative law is indeed no task for sissies. Or for dummies, may I add. Yet, if the rule of law is to prevail, a way must be found."

== As threats to masculine dominance ==
In China, men who display feminine characteristics are sometimes perceived as threats to masculine power. For example, in 2018, official Chinese state media derided "sissy pants" young men (who use makeup, are slender, and wear androgynous clothing) as part of a "sickly" culture that threatened the future of the nation by undermining its militaristic image. In 2021, China's Ministry of Education issued guidelines for the "cultivation of students' masculinity" to "prevent the feminization of male adolescents" through sports, physical education, and "health education" in schools.

In 2021, the National Radio and Television Administration of China added a ban on "sissy men and other abnormal esthetics" to its rules using the offensive term niang pao.

== In gender and LGBTQ studies ==
In his The "Sissy Boy Syndrome" and the Development of Homosexuality (1987), the sexologist Richard Green compared two groups of boys: one group was conventionally masculine; the other group, who Green called "feminine boys" and other children called "sissy", engaged in doll play and other behavior typical for girls. In his 15-year longitudinal study, Green looked at cross-gender behavior in boys who later turned out to be transgender, or homosexual as well as a control group, and analyzed such features as interest in sports, playroom toy preferences, doll-play fantasy, physical behavior ("acting like a girl" vs rough-and-tumble play), cross-dressing, and psychological behavior, using tests, questionnaires, interviews, and follow-ups. He also looked at the influence of parental relationships and reaction to atypical behavior. Later follow-ups found that, ultimately, 3/4 of the feminine or "sissy" boys developed into gay or bisexual men, whereas only one of the control group did. Analysis of the nature/nurture issue was inconclusive.

The term sissyphobia denotes a negative cultural reaction against "sissy boys" thought prevalent in 1974. Sissyphobia has more recently been used in some queer studies; other authors in this latter area have proposed effeminiphobia, femiphobia, femmephobia, or effemimania as alternative terms.

Gregory M. Herek wrote that sissyphobia arises as a combination of misogyny and homophobia. Communication scholar Shinsuke Eguchi (2011) stated:

The discourse of straight-acting produces and reproduces anti-femininity and homophobia (Clarkson. 2006). For example, feminine gay men are often labeled "fem," "bitchy," "pissy," "sissy," or "queen" (e.g., Christian, 2005; Clarkson, 2006; Payne, 2007). They are perceived as if they perform like "women," spurring straight-acting gay men to have negative attitudes toward feminine-acting gay men (Clarkson, 2006; Payne, 2007; Ward, 2000). This is called sissyphobia (Bergling, 2001). Kimmel (1996) supports that "masculinity has been (historically) defined as the flight from women and the repudiation of femininity" (p. 123). Thus, sissyphobia plays as the communication strategy for straight-acting gay men to justify and empower their masculinity. (p. 38).

Eguchi added, "I wonder how 'sissyphobia' particularly plays into the dynamic of domestic violence processes in the straight-acting and effeminate-acting male same-sex coupling pattern." (p. 53).

== In sexual subcultures and fetishes ==
In the BDSM practice of forced feminization, the male bottom undergoing cross-dressing may be called a sissy as a form of erotic humiliation. Another common theme is the use of a chastity belt, compounding the male bottom's humiliation by restricting the size and access to their genitals.

Autogynephilic Persuasive Pornography (AGPP) or Sissy Hypno follows the similar context of the above where the viewer (typically male) is suggested in a hypnotic manner to undergo "sissyfication" via suggestive audio and hypnotic visuals.

In paraphilic infantilism, a sissy baby is a man who likes to play the role of a baby girl.

=== Petticoating ===
Petticoating or pinaforing is a type of forced feminization that involves dressing a man or boy in girls' clothing as a form of humiliation or punishment, or as a fetish. Petticoating roleplay may include being forced to wear makeup and to carry dolls, purses, and other items associated with girls. There is some evidence that "petticoat punishment" has occasionally been used as a form of child discipline, with credible stories of such going back at least to Victorian times.

=== Techniques ===
This fantasy and sexual roleplay involves a male being forced to wear female clothing, under threat of corporal punishment, public humiliation or another erotic humiliation activity. Afterwards, the victim sometimes finds out that they actually enjoy such punishment, and becomes more "feminine," polite and controllable. He is then often forced to wear an article of girl's clothing permanently until a certain age, or until a role-play scenario is finished.

Often, there are specific themes for said petticoating. Often, petticoating revolves around the "little girl" aspect in which the submissive/child is forced to act like a little girl. Other scenarios include infantilism and sissy maid.

Clothing considered female include a bra, panties, tights, stockings, corset, petticoat, pinafore (often in the style of a French maid), dress (often extremely short or revealing, often with lock), skirt (often a mini/micro skirt), shoes (often Mary Janes or heels), etc. Other items include nail polish, choker (close fitting necklace), etc.

=== Political incorrectness ===
Stella Gonzalez-Arnal of the Department of Philosophy at the University of Hull sees pinaforing as a "politically incorrect form of sexuality" in which "women's clothing and women's traditional occupations" are regarded "as inferior and humiliating; reinforcing undesirable stereotypes by characterising females as submissive, passive, helpless and subservient." She adds "I will argue that petticoating is a politically ambiguous form of sexuality which can have positive readings. I claim that it can be educational and therapeutical and that it can subvert our notions of masculinity and femininity."

=== Literary accounts ===
A number of erotic novels of the Victorian period contain accounts of pinaforing.

In Gynecocracy: A Narrative of the Adventures and Psychological Experiences of Julian Robinson, by "Viscount Ladywood" (1893), the author recounts his punishment as a boy at the hands of the governess to whom he is sent, along with three female cousins, after taking indecent liberties with a household maid. Forced to wear girls' clothing as his ordinary attire, Julian, as Julia, is subjected to frequent flagellations, as are his cousins, one of whom he later marries, submitting to her dominance through continued forced feminization and crossdressing.

The Victorian classic, My Secret Life by "Walter" (1888), contains an account of pinaforing in which the main character, Walter, witnesses the birching of a wealthy middle-aged man by a prostitute while the man wears feminine attire.

The Pearl, A Journal of Facetiae and Voluptuous Reading (1879–1880), a Victorian pornographic magazine, also contains an account of the flagellation of a victim dressed as a woman, although, in the strict sense, this account does not represent pinaforing per se because the man, Frank, is not petticoated as part of his punishment but has, rather, dressed in ladies' garments to disguise himself as a woman: to avenge herself, Lucretia persuades Frank to pose as his sister and to join a ladies' private whipping club, the qualification for admission to which is the applicant's receipt of a whipping.

== See also ==
- Feminization
- Female submission
- Maledom
- Butch and femme
- Cuckoldry as a fetish
- Effeminacy
- Feminization (activity)
- Male submission
- Maledom
- Girly girl
- Gynecocracy, 1893 novel
- Lavender Scare
- Molly house
- Pinafore eroticism
- Sexism
- Sissy villain
- Tomboy
- Toxic masculinity
- Trans bashing
- Transphobia

== Sources ==
- Random House Dictionary of the English Language - Second Edition - Unabridged, Random House, New York (1987). ISBN 978-0-3945-0050-8
