= Metrosexual =

Lifestyle of urban men

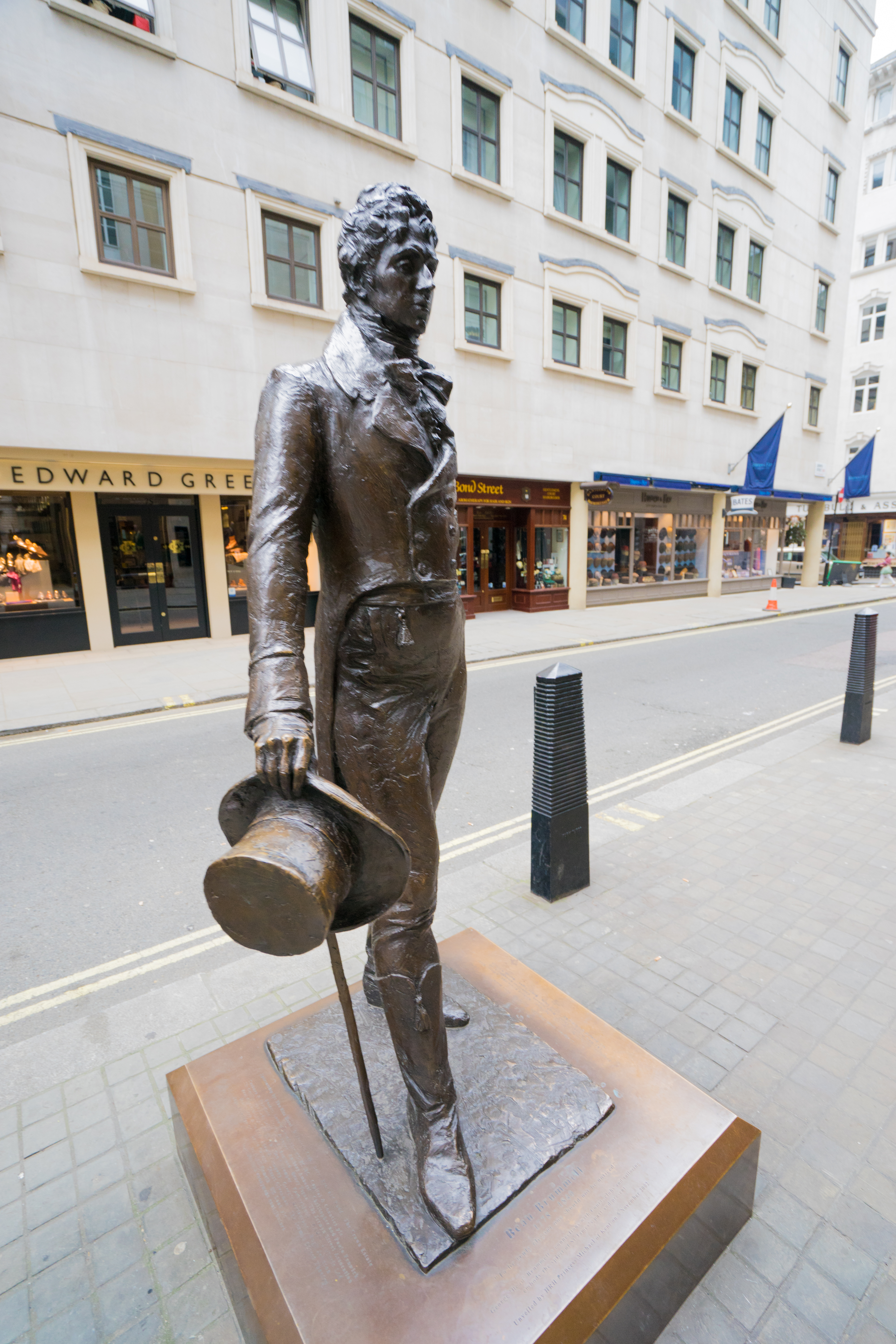
A statue of Beau Brummell on Jermyn Street, a street famous for high-class tailoring.

Metrosexual (a portmanteau of metropolitan and heterosexual) is a term for a man who is especially meticulous about his personal style, grooming and appearance. It is often used to refer to heterosexual men who are perceived to be 'effeminate' rather than strictly adhering to stereotypical masculinity standards.

== Origin ==
The term metrosexual originated in an article by Mark Simpson published on November 15, 1994, in The Independent. Although various sources attributed the term to Marian Salzman, she credited Simpson as the original source for her usage of the word.

Metrosexual man, the single young man with a high disposable income, living or working in the city (because that's where all the best shops are), is perhaps the most promising consumer market of the decade. In the Eighties he was only to be found inside fashion magazines such as GQ. In the Nineties, he's everywhere and he's going shopping.

The typical metrosexual is a young man with money to spend, living in or within easy reach of a metropolis—because that's where all the best shops, clubs, gyms and hairdressers are. He might be officially gay, straight or bisexual, but this is utterly immaterial because he has clearly taken himself as his own love object and pleasure as his sexual preference.

The advertising agency Euro RSCG Worldwide adopted the term shortly thereafter for a marketing study. In 2003, The New York Times ran a story, "Metrosexuals Come Out". The term and its connotations continued to roll steadily into more news outlets around the world. Though it did represent a complex and gradual change in the shopping and self-presentation habits of both men and women, the idea of metrosexuality was often distilled in the media down to a few men and a short checklist of vanities, like skin care products, scented candles and costly, colorful dress shirts and pricey designer jeans. It was this image of the metrosexual—that of a straight young man who got pedicures and facials, practiced aromatherapy and spent freely on clothes—that contributed to a backlash against the term from men who merely wanted to feel free to take more care with their appearance than had been the norm in the 1990s, when companies abandoned dress codes, Dockers khakis became a popular brand, and XL, or extra-large, became the one size that fit all. A 60 Minutes story on 1960s–70s pro footballer Joe Namath suggested he was "perhaps, America's first metrosexual" after filming his most famous ad sporting Beautymist pantyhose.

The term metrosexual has also been used in a pejorative fashion to refer to an effeminate or gay man.

== Historic parallels ==
Fashion designer Tom Ford drew parallels when he described David Beckham as a "total modern dandy", referencing the Aesthetic Movement of the 19th century, likening metrosexuality to a modern incarnation of a dandy. Ford suggested that "macho" sporting role models who also care about fashion and appearance influence masculine norms in wider society.

John Mercer and Feona Attwood draw parallels to earlier shifts in the gestalt of masculinity and the corresponding reaction of US media, and the media's role in defining contemporary gender archetypes. They highlight the term "crisis of masculinity" coined by political commentator Arthur Schlesinger Jr. who claimed that masculinity was imperiled by women becoming more independent. Mercer and Attwood argue that Simpson, in his articles coining metrosexuality, is a reference to a longer media tradition of writing about masculinity in fluctuation.

Thomas Erik Chris links the term metrosexual to contemporary (as of 2024) masculine archetypal language, likening "metrosexual" to "looksmaxxing alpha male" and "muscle gay", noting the historic parallels in media identity, marketing, and consumerism.

== Related terms ==
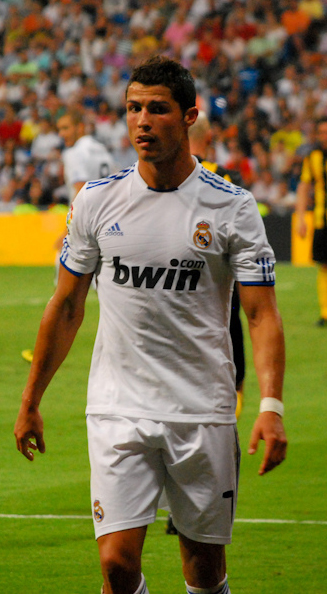
Cristiano Ronaldo has been described as a "spornosexual"

Over the course of the following years, other terms countering or substituting for "metrosexual" appeared.

- Retrosexual: It meant anti- or pre-metrosexual sense. Later on, the term was used by some to describe men who subscribed to what they believed to be the grooming and dress standards of a previous era, such as the handsome, impeccably turned-out fictional character of Donald Draper in the television series Mad Men, itself set in the early 1960s New York advertising world.
- Ubersexual: A term coined by marketing executives and authors of The Future of Men.
- Spornosexual: A term blending sports, porn, and sexual. In 2016, Simpson argued that footballer Cristiano Ronaldo represents "a fusion of sport and porn [...] Cultivating an athletic body as an object of desire, and showing it off on social networks, accumulating sexual partners. It's a tendency with young men."
- Technosexual: A term that circulated in media, fashion, and online outlets of the 2000s to describe a male that possesses a strong aesthetic sense and a love of technology. Swedish footballer Freddie Ljungberg is often cited as the perfect example of a technosexual man, due to an image of masculine sensuality and tech savviness.
- Lumbersexual: In 2016–2017, the "lumbersexual" term circulated in media, fashion, and online outlets, describing a type of male aesthetics that use outdoor gear for urban aesthetics rather than function.
- Female metrosexual: Although the term refers mostly to men, a discussion exists on whether women can be metrosexuals. Characters from the HBO series Sex and the City have been described as wo-metrosexuality to illustrate how the metrosexual lifestyle de-emphasizes traditional male and female gender roles.
- Performative male: Also known as the matcha man, performative males consume traditionally female media, fiction, and food to attract attention from women. The Times likened them to "the modern metrosexual".
- Looksmaxxer: A member of the incelosphere. The looksmaxxer demographic largely consists of young heterosexual men in the incelosphere intending to improve their looks through extreme methods such as dieting, off-label pharmaceuticals and cosmetic surgeries. The looksmaxxing community directly derives from obscure platforms of the incelosphere, and many looksmaxxers seek to improve their appearance in order to escape celibacy and become sexually successful.

=== Changing masculinity ===
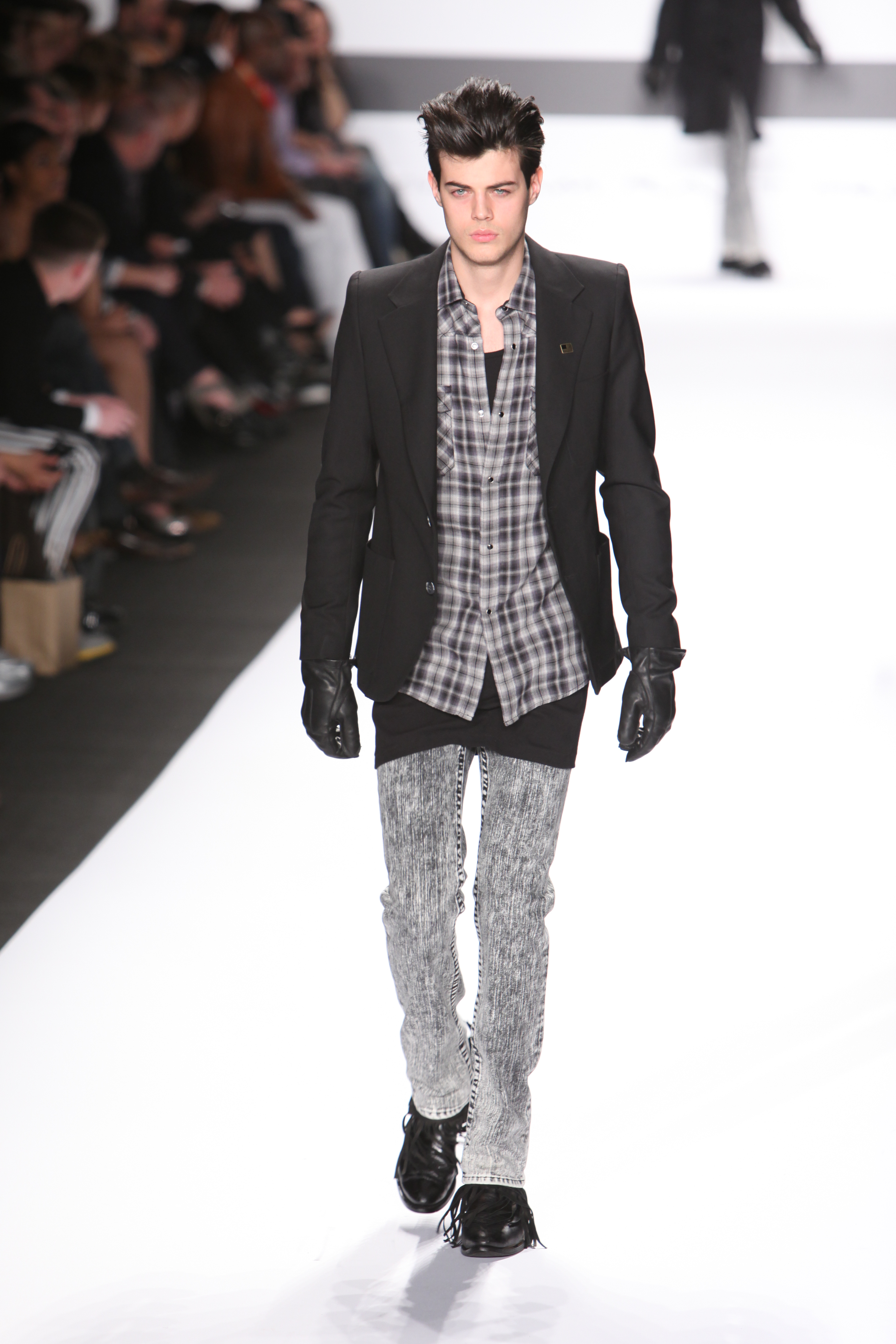
Men's fashion industry and consumer culture is closely related to the concept of the metrosexual man.

Traditional masculine norms, as described in psychologist Ronald F. Levant's Masculinity Reconstructed are: "avoidance of femininity; restricted emotions; sex disconnected from intimacy; pursuit of achievement and status; self-reliance; strength; aggression and homophobia".

Various studies, including market research by Euro RSCG, have suggested that the pursuit of achievement and status is not as important to men as it used to be; and neither is, to a degree, the restriction of emotions or the disconnection of sex from intimacy. Another norm change supported by research is that men "no longer find sexual freedom universally enthralling". Lillian Alzheimer noted less avoidance of femininity and the "emergence of a segment of men who have embraced customs and attitudes once deemed the province of women".

Men's fashion magazines—such as Details, Men's Vogue, and the defunct Cargo—targeted what one Details editor called "men who moisturize and read a lot of magazines".

Changes in culture and attitudes toward masculinity, visible in the media through television shows such as Queer Eye for the Straight Guy, Queer as Folk, and Will & Grace, have changed these traditional masculine norms. Metrosexuals only made their appearance after cultural changes in the environment and changes in views on masculinity. Simpson said in his article "Metrosexual? That rings a bell..." that "Gay men provided the early prototype for metrosexuality. Decidedly single, definitely urban, dreadfully uncertain of their identity (hence the emphasis on pride and the susceptibility to the latest label) and socially emasculated, gay men pioneered the business of accessorising—and combining—masculinity and desirability."

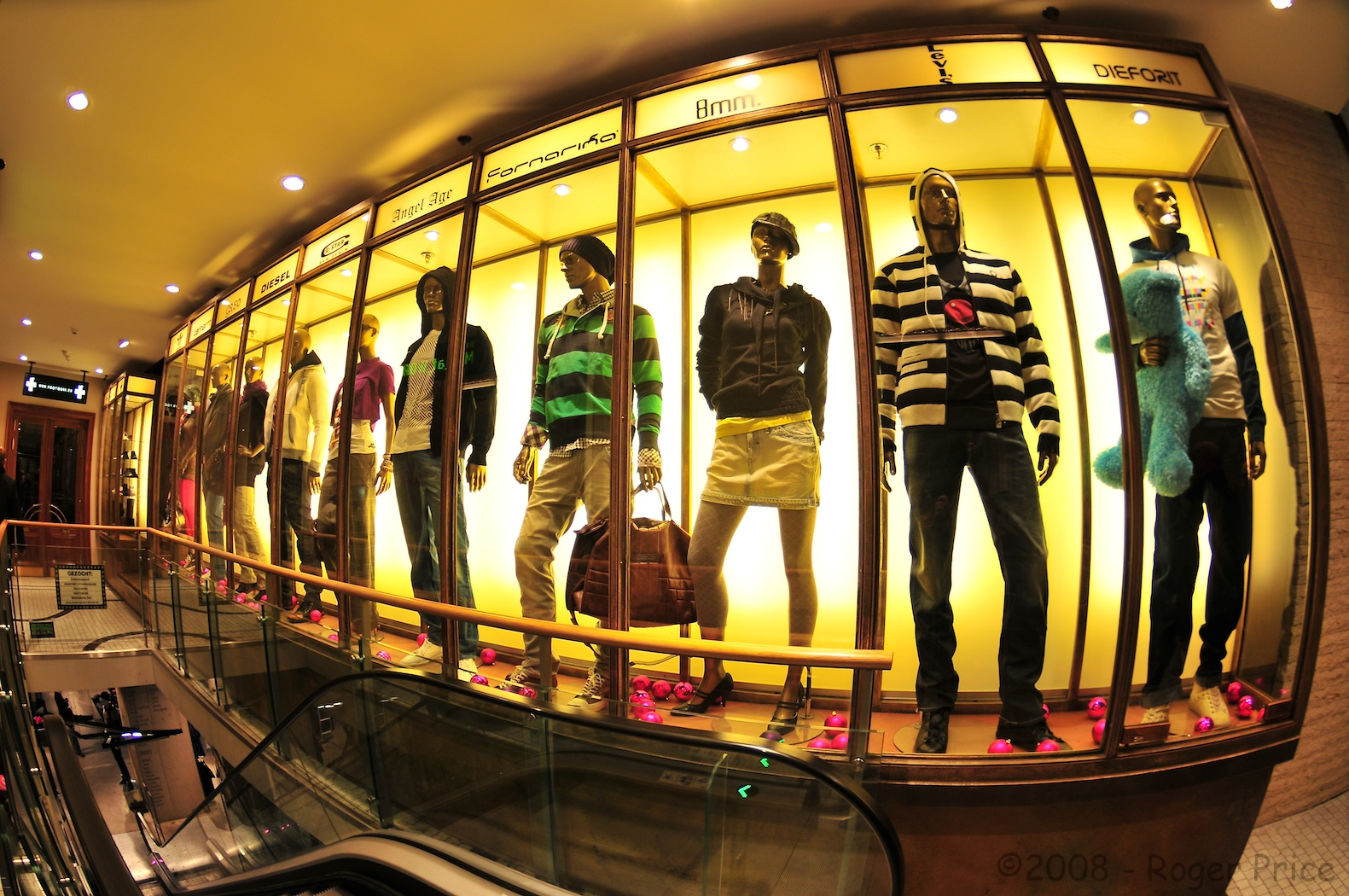
By 2004, men were buying 69 percent of their own apparel, according to retail analyst Marshal Cohen

But such probing analyses into various shoppers' psyches may have ignored other significant factors affecting men's shopping habits, foremost among them women's shopping habits. As the retail analyst Marshal Cohen explained in a 2005 article in the New York Times entitled, "Gay or Straight? Hard to Tell", the fact that women buy less of men's clothing than they used to has, more than any other factor, propelled men into stores to shop for themselves. "In 1985 only 25 percent of all men's apparel was bought by men, he said; 75 percent was bought by women for men. By 1998 men were buying 52 percent of apparel; in 2004 that number grew to 69 percent and shows no sign of slowing." One result of this shift was the revelation that men cared more about how they look than the women shopping for them had.

However, despite changes in masculinity, research has suggested men still feel social pressure to endorse traditional masculine male models in advertising. Martin and Gnoth (2009) found that feminine men preferred feminine models in private, but stated a preference for the traditional masculine models when their collective self was salient. In other words, feminine men endorsed traditional masculine models when they were concerned about being classified by other men as feminine. The authors suggested this result reflected the social pressure on men to endorse traditional masculine norms.

== In marketing ==
Whereas the metrosexual was a cultural observation, the term is used in marketing and popular media. In this context, the metrosexual is a heterosexual, urban man who is in touch with his feminine side—he color-coordinates, cares deeply about exfoliation, and has perhaps manscaped.

== Trend journalism ==
Devon Powers, a professor of critical media studies at University of Michigan, uses the early 2000s US media coverage of metrosexuality as a case study in defining the concept of trend journalism. In her analysis, she argues that the early-2000s US media interest in metrosexuality was driven by marketers who have co-opted the term from 1990s queer culture as part of an ongoing effort to get men to shop more, claiming that by this point, the concept of metrosexuality had evolved from a subversion of traditional masculinity into a drive for masculine consumerism. Moreover, Powers uses this case study as part of her thesis, that while trend journalism attempts to explain emergent cultural phenomena, that it may also play a role in trendsetting.

John Mercer and Feona Attwood echo this, arguing that changes in the polysemic definition of masculinity are not only reported and categorized in media "in the business of ‘producing’ masculinity", but that this model of masculinity is generated as one constructed by media .

== See also ==
- Alpha and beta male
- Bishōnen
- Chad
- Dandy
- Fop
- Himbo
- Homomasculinity
- Ikemen
- Kkonminam
- Lumbersexual
- Macaroni
- New Man
- New Romantic
- Pink capitalism
- Twink
- "South Park Is Gay!" (TV episode)
- Metrosexuality (TV series)
