= Technosexual =

Male personality type

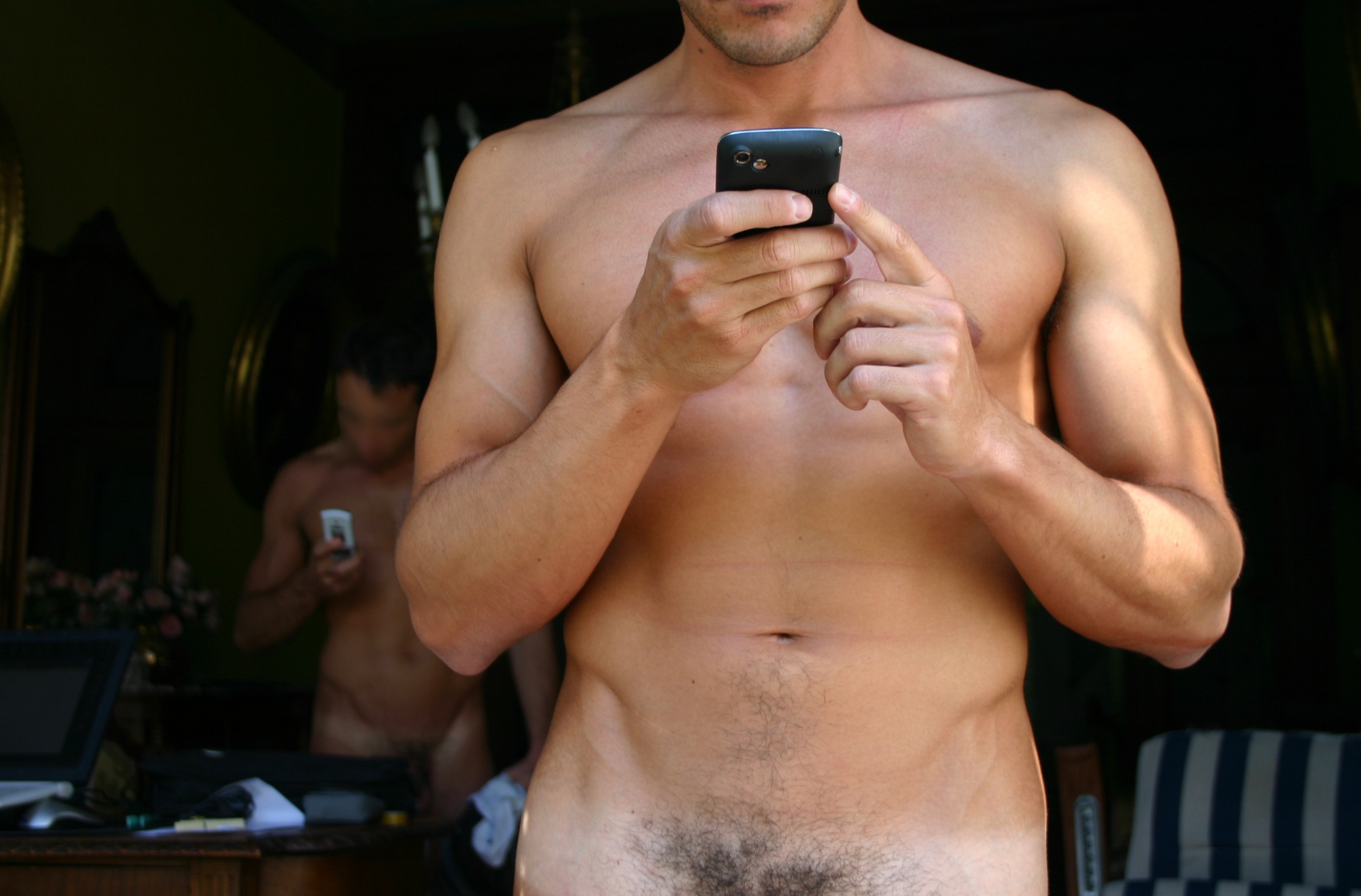
Conventionally attractive men holding mobile phones in 2007. The 00s saw both the expansion of mobile technology and changing attitudes towards the male pursuit of personal appearance, then often described as "metrosexuality".

Technosexual (derived from Greek Greek: τέχνη – technē, "art, ability, craft" and Latin sexuālis, "sexual") is a term that circulated in media, fashion, and online outlets of the 2000s to describe a male that possesses a strong aesthetic sense and a love of technology.

== History ==
The term "technosexuality" had been in use since the 70s, originally referring to a sexual attraction toward machines, robots, and androids, being synonymous with ASFR or "other sexual devices not really occurring in real life".

The first usage of the term as a concept distinct from ASFR was coined by US physicist and mathematician Ricky Montalvo in 2003, as a portmanteau of "technophile" and "metrosexual". He provided the following description of a technosexual man:

technosexual

(TEK.noh.sek.shoo.ul) n. dandyish narcissist in love with not only himself, but also his urban lifestyle & gadgets; a man who is in touch with his feminine side but has fondness for electronics such as cell phones, pda's, computers, software, and the web.

— Ricky Montalvo, Technosexual.org

Montalvo later shared the same definition to the Urban Dictionary, while augmenting it with the following passage:

Someone who is a geek in of style, or a stylish person in need of geek is a technosexual.

— Ricky Montalvo, Urban Dictionary

The term soon gained traction across news websites and social media, being dubbed as "the uber tribe of Geeks". A Facebook group titled "I married a technosexual" was created by Joanna Wiebe, who dedicated it "for anyone who is married, or attached, to a total technosexual".

In 2005 the Calvin Klein company trademarked the term technosexual as part of their 'CK in2u' fragrance campaign. The fragrance bottle was designed by Stephen Burks, resembled an Apple iPod, featuring glass and white plastic. Tom Murry, the president of the company, claimed they had "envisioned [CK in2u] as the first fragrance for the technosexual generation". Press materials for the product highlighted modern-day technology-driven interactions, with lines such as "She likes how he blogs, her texts turn him on. It's intense. For right now."

== Characteristics ==
Swedish footballer Fredrik Ljungberg is often cited as the perfect example of a technosexual man, due to an image of masculine sensuality and tech savviness.

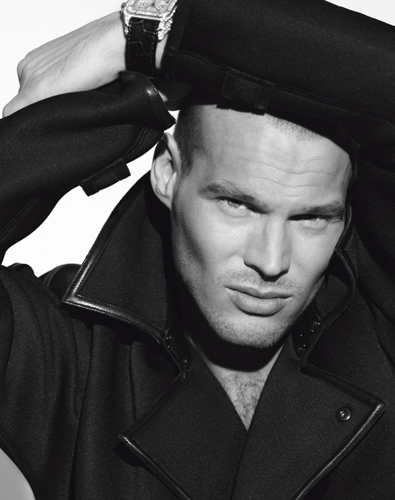
Swedish footballer Fredrik Ljungberg in model shoot for a men's magazine in 2008.

In a 2004 interview, Montalvo gave the following description of a technosexual lifestyle:

With metrosexuality, it's about style, fashion, culture, and grooming for the straight male. A metrosexual man may be seen at an NBA game one night and an art gallery opening the next.

We take it one step further by adding technology. A technosexual man may not need to go to the NBA game because he can get highlights and scores via SMS or by browsing the web on his PDA while at the art gallery.

It has been suggested that a female counterpart to a technosexual is a "technosexualista" or a "technodiva". A change in women's standards when searching for a partner is suggested to be part of the technosexual appeal, as "the woman's ideal man" has been transformed by technology from "someone who can mow the lawn, change the oil in the household cars, and clean the rain gutters" into "someone who can troubleshoot the household DSL or get last-minute movie showtimes".

== See also ==
- Technophilia
- Metrosexual
- Dandy
- Robosexual
- Spornosexual
