= Freya Fox =

- Fox at Tokyo Game Show 2025

Background information
- Born: Janelle Kao
- Genre: Electronic Dance Music
- Occupation: DJ
- Years active: 2016–present
- Website: freyafoxtv.com

Janelle Kao, known professionally as Freya Fox, is an American DJ.

== Streaming career ==
Kao grew up playing Call of Duty and specialized in fighting games. In 2018, as Freya Fox, Kao signed a content deal for her gaming content with Facebook Gaming and won the inaugural Facebook Gaming Fighting Game Championship that year at Pax West. In 2019, the deal lapsed and she shifted her focus to TikTok content.

In 2022, Kao was signed to TikTok Live US. She subsequently appeared in various TikTok Live US takeovers where Fox would take over the official @Tiktoklive US account and stream.

== Music career ==
In September 2022, Kao appeared opposite comedians Atsuko Okatsuka and Joel Kim Booster at the Life Is Beautiful festival in Las Vegas, Nevada,

In December 2022, Kao performed at the inaugural LA3C music and arts festival where she premiered her song "I'm Too Free".

== Personal life ==
Kao is a lesbian.From 2016 to 2018, she lived in Taiwan. In 2020, she moved to Las Vegas.
