= XXR =

XXR may refer to:

- Little fresh meat (Chinese: xiǎo xiān ròu), Chinese slang for handsome young males, especially celebrities
- Koropó language (ISO 639-3 code xxr), an extinct Brazilian language
- XXR, an ISO 3166 placeholder code for an imaginary country
