= Twink =

Gay slang for a thin, young-looking man

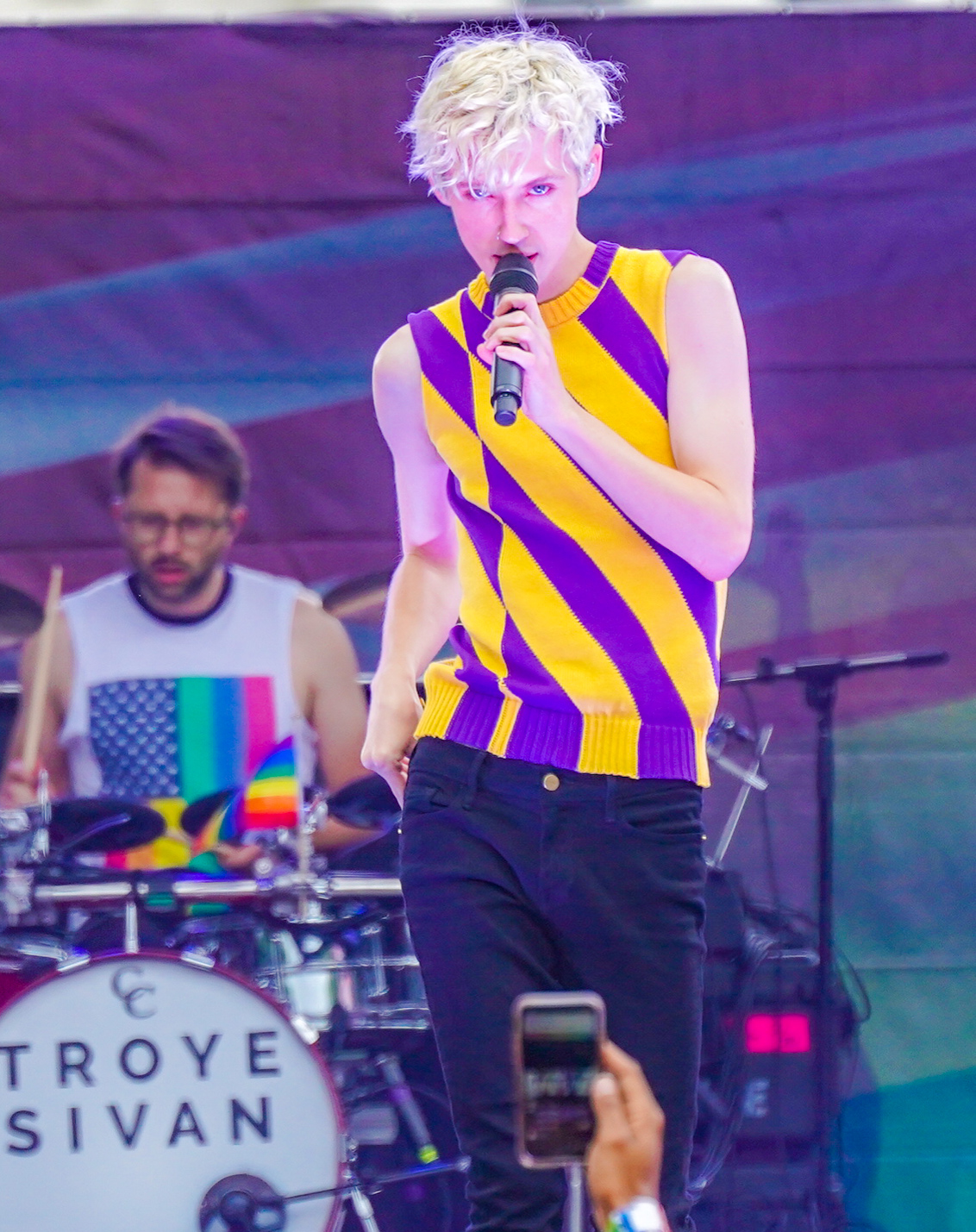
Australian singer-songwriter Troye Sivan has been described in media, and by himself, as a twink.

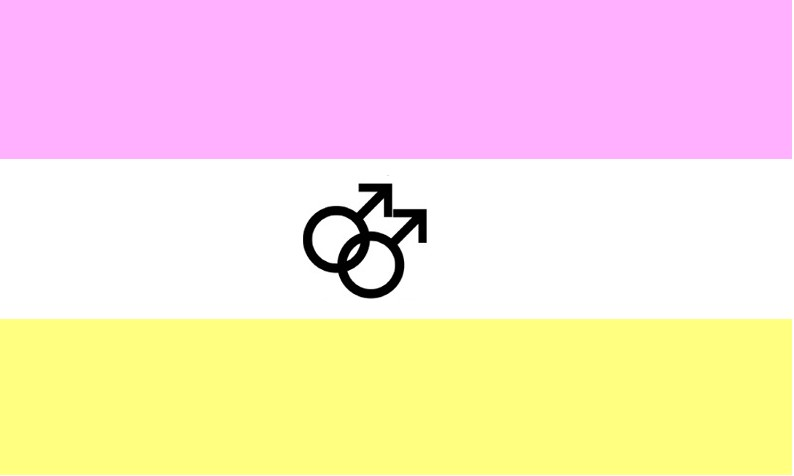
The twink pride flag has two Mars symbols entwined, representing gay men.

Twink is gay slang for a male who is usually in his late teens to twenties whose other traits may include a slim physique, a youthful appearance, and little or no body hair. The age range for twinks is generally considered to be from around 18 to 25 years old. Twink is used both as a neutral descriptor, which can be compared with bear, and as a pejorative.

== Etymology ==
The exact origins of the term twink are disputed. It may be derived from an older British gay slang term twank, which means: "The quarry of a homosexual prostitute (male); a man willing and ready to become any dominant man's 'partner'".

Another possible origin of the term may be a derivation from the American snack cake Twinkie, commonly regarded as the quintessential junk food. The food is described as "little nutritional value, sweet to the taste, and creme-filled"; by comparison, the young men are described as "short, and blond, and full of creme", with creme being a euphemism for semen.

A backronym has been constructed for twink, according to which it stands for "teenaged, white, into no kink", although these specified traits are not universally accepted as either necessary or sufficient to classify an individual as a "twink". The slang term chicken used to be used in British gay communities to refer to a young gay man, similar to twink.

=== Twunk ===
The term twunk, a portmanteau of twink and hunk, customarily refers to an older or more muscular twink.

== Usage ==
The first recorded definition of twink appeared in a 1963 article for the journal American Speech, wherein it was likened to the derogatory gay terms pansy, punk, and petunia. Oxford Dictionaries places its origins in the 1950s.

=== Popular culture ===
In his book Never Enough (2007), about a murder committed in 2003 in Hong Kong, described by The New York Times Book Review as hard-boiled clichés with a cartoonish first impression, Joe McGinniss describes a court case in which twink was defined as a gay slang term used to denote an attractive, boyish-looking gay man between the ages of 18 and 22, slender and with little or no body hair, often blond, often but not necessarily Caucasian.

The term was derisively used on online message boards to describe YouTuber Cara Cunningham, then known as Chris Cocker, after her video "Leave Britney Alone!" went viral in 2007. It had reached widespread usage in media by 2013, according to Thomas Rogers of The Awl, who pointed as proof to its usages in the television series Girls and Happy Endings and by television personalities JWoww and Andy Cohen, the latter of whom apologized for using it to refer to the boy band One Direction. Rogers also identified various television and film characters of the time, including Maxxie Oliver of Skins, Kurt Hummel of Glee, and Elijah Krantz of Girls, as "more nuanced twink characters" than had previously appeared in media. It has also been used to describe straight male celebrities who are skinny and have a youthful appearance, like Timothée Chalamet and young Leonardo DiCaprio, although some object to it being used to refer to non-gay men.

In the 2021 Netflix adult animated spy series Q-Force, the character Twink (voiced by Matt Rogers) is an effeminate twink and drag queen who moonlights as a "master of disguise".

The term twink death is used to refer to a twink aging out of the status and losing their youthful appearance. The term has also been used in popular culture to compare celebrities' appearances as they age.

=== Gay subculture ===
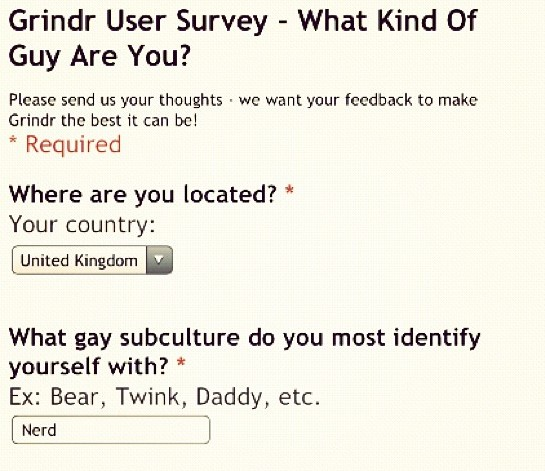
Grindr survey asking users what subculture they identify with prior to its update in 2017, using twink as an example

The term twink serves to identify a subculture within gay culture for which members of the community may self-identify, but their stable assurance mostly comes from acceptance by other members. The subculture, as examined now, serves as a purely physical marker for attributes any one person may hold or acquire, highly dependent on normative society's take on beauty standards as a whole and what the community puts forth and prescribes to.

The "Castro clone" look fell out of favor after the 1980s, partly due to its association with the rise of HIV/AIDS, and, according to Shaun M. Filiault and Murray J.N. Drummond of the University of South Australia, had largely been supplanted by the twink as the ideal look among Western gay men by the 1990s and early 2000s. Studies of young gay men in the mid-2000s showed that the markers they deemed most attractive were slim and slightly toned figures, little to no body hair, and youthfulness. Les K. Wright wrote in his 1997 book The Bear Book that twinks were representative of hegemonic masculinity and that bears were a "counter-statement" to it. Peter Hennen similarly wrote in 2005 for the journal Gender & Society that the twink had become "the dominant ideal of gay masculinity" and acted as an "oppositional anchor" for bears.

Grindr, a popular dating app for gay men, lists the term as one of many "tribes" for users to "identify themselves with a niche group and filter their search to help find their type of guy".

=== Gay pornography ===
The term is often modified by various descriptors (e.g. femme twink, Euro twink, muscle twink) and is commonly used in the gay pornography industry.

Essayist Zeb J. Tortorici notes that gay twink porn thrives on the production and performance of "consumable and visually/anally receptive masculinity." A twink is "memorable for his outer packaging", not his "inner depth". Twink can be seen as a popular subgenre in gay porn widely consumed across the globe. In gay pornographic content, a twink usually, but not in all cases, plays the role of the submissive and receiving character commonly known as a bottom.

== Analysis ==
Susan Driver, an associate professor at York University specialized in feminism and queer theory, characterized the word twink as relying on "ageist and racist tropes of youth and white desirability". In regards to the concept, she describes it as "a young, white, and performed masculinity that can be fetishized, consumed, ... clearly coded in terms of race and age", thus establishing the intersection for which race and age come together to create a hyper-sexualized denomination, often associated with sexual acts and the pornographic industry. Rogers considered the term to have morphed from "a cutesy, mildly negative stereotype" into "easy shorthand for a lot of vicious stereotypes about gay people" and a way to generally mock one's "gayness" by 2013.

== See also ==
- Age disparity in sexual relationships
- Bishōnen
- Ephebos
- Femboy
- Himbo
- Human male sexuality
- Little fresh meat
- Metrosexual
