= Ulzzang =

South Korean term

- Hangul: 얼짱
- RR: eoljjang
- MR: ŏltchang

Ulzzang (Korean: 얼짱, pronounced [ʌl.t͈ɕɐŋ]) is a popular South Korean term literally meaning "best face" or "good-looking". A person desiring ulzzang status would gain popularity on the internet through entering contests where their photos are judged and chosen by voters. The trend is unisex, as it applies both to males and females.

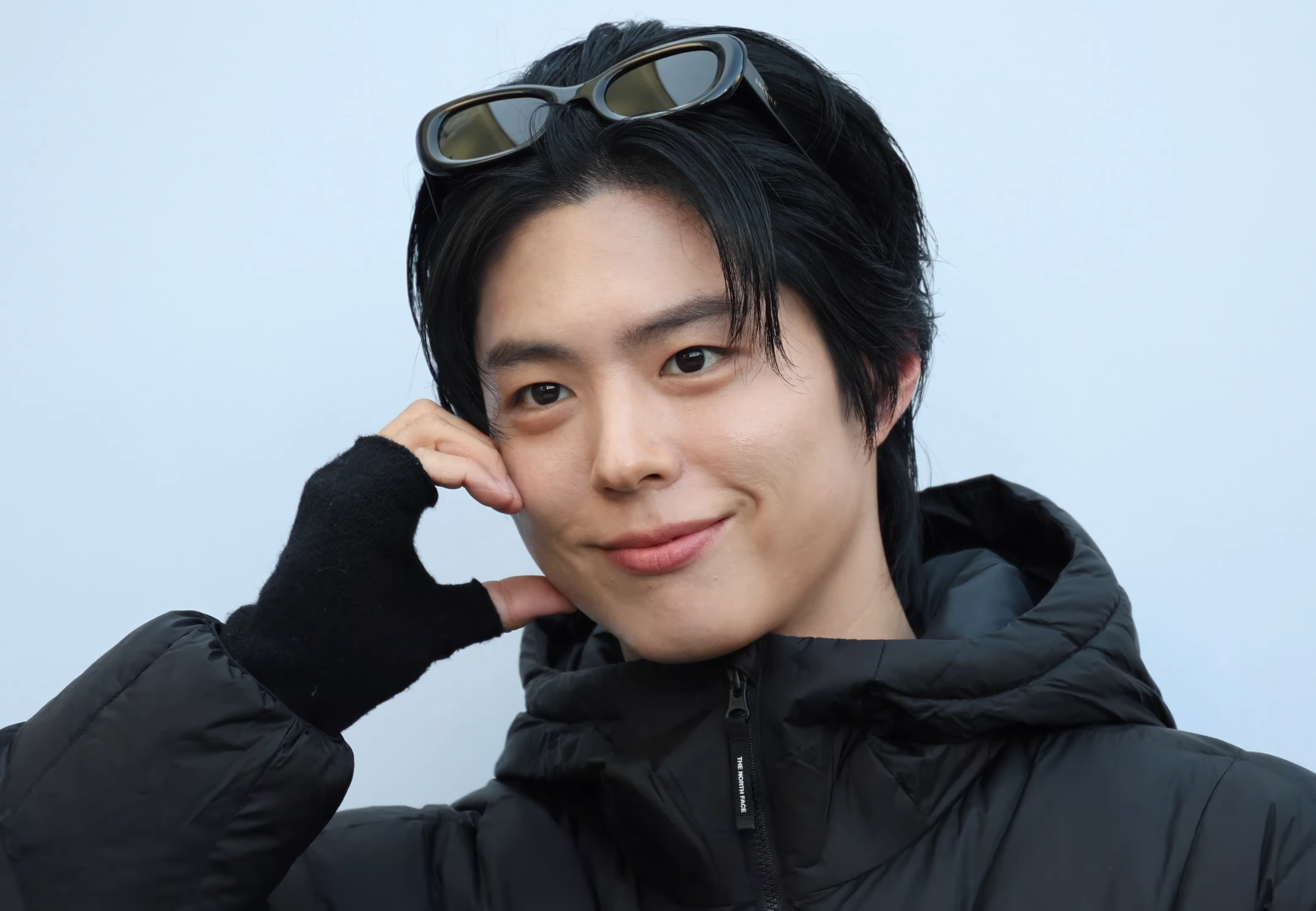
Before his debut as an actor, Park Bo-gum was known as an ulzzang in his neighborhood

Several Korean actors and K-pop idols were known as ulzzang in their neighborhoods and internet communities like Cyworld before their debuts in the entertainment industry. They include singer Kang Min-kyung of Davichi, singer Jung Yong-hwa of CNBLUE, and actor Park Bo-gum, among others.

The popularity and influence of Korean popular culture throughout Asia has led to ulzzangs becoming a trend in Asian countries such as China, Vietnam, Indonesia, Japan, Malaysia, the Philippines, Singapore, and certain parts of South Asia.

== See also ==
- Aegyo
- Bishōjo
- Bishōnen
- Ikemen
- Kkonminam
- Moe
