= Marian Salzman =

Jewish-American business executive (born 1959)

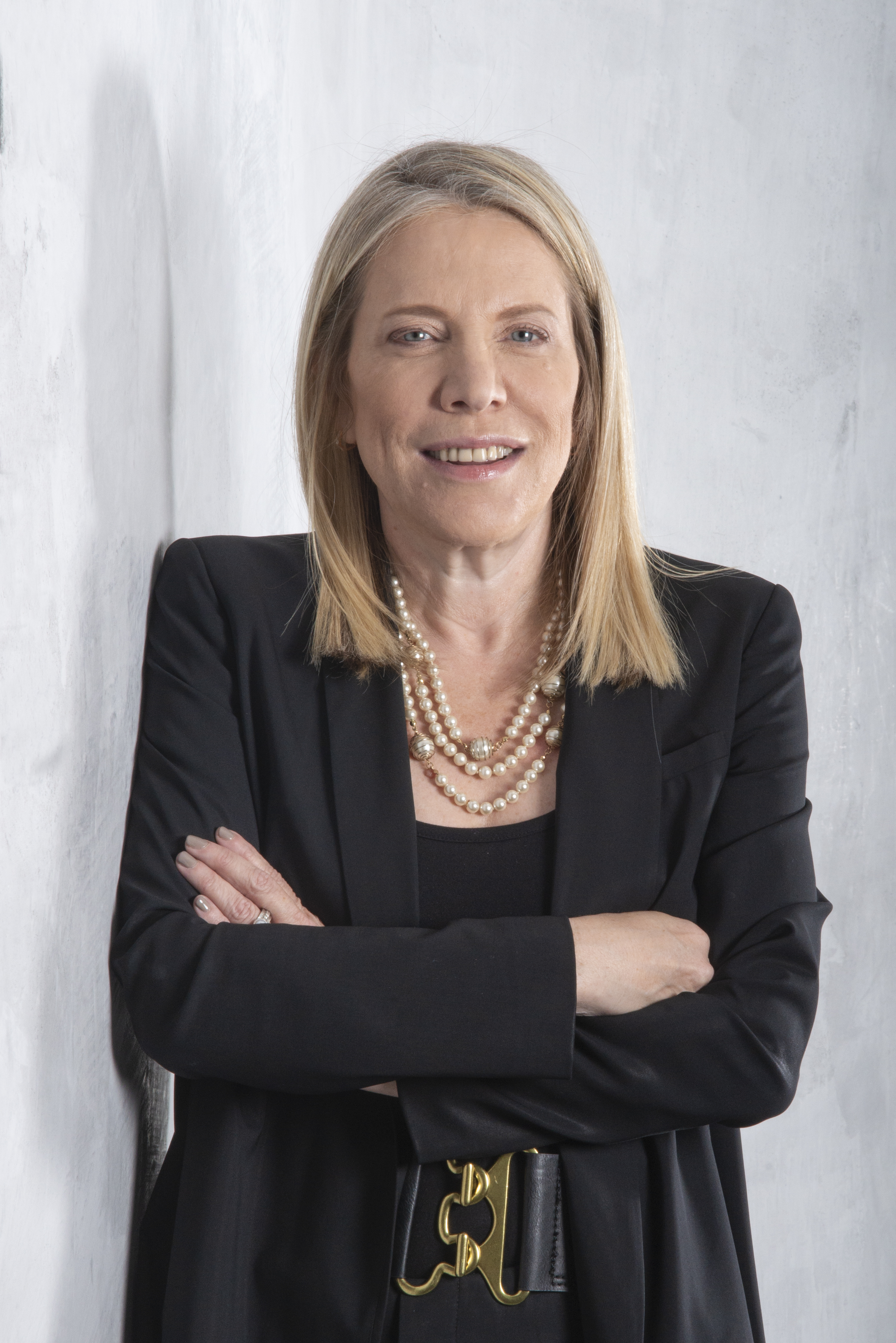
- Salzman in 2018
- Born: Marian Salzman; February 15, 1959 (age 67); New York City, New York
- Education: Brown University
- Occupation: SVP Global Communications Philip Morris International
- Spouse: Jim Diamond
- Website: mariansalzman.com

Marian Salzman (born February 15, 1959) is an American advertising and public relations executive. She is Senior Vice President, Global Communications for Philip Morris International, a tobacco company. She was formerly CEO of Havas PR North America and chaired the Global Collective, the organizing collaborative of all of the PR assets of Havas. She rejoined Euro RSCG in August 2009, having previously worked for the holding company as executive vice president, chief strategic officer, from January 2001 to October 2004.

== Career ==
Salzman is a graduate of Brown University. She began her career working on the development of new research methodologies, from slumber parties for tweenagers, a project for Levi Strauss & Co. in 1991, to the creation of Cyberdialogue in 1992, to leverage instant messaging and AOL chat rooms for social research.

- 1992: Co-founded Cyberdialogue, the world's first online market research company, with partners Jay Chiat and Tom Cohen
- 1993–1995: Director of consumer insights and emerging media at Chiat\Day
- 1995–1997: Worldwide director of TBWA’s Department of the Future
- 1997–2000: President, Intelligence Factory, Young & Rubicam
- 2001–2004: Executive vice president and chief strategy officer at Euro RSCG Worldwide
- 2005–March 2008: Executive vice president and chief marketing officer at JWT Worldwide (member of 12-person worldwide executive committee)
- March 2008–August 2009: Partner and chief marketing officer at Porter Novelli (member of 10-person worldwide executive committee)
- 2009–present: President then CEO of Euro RSCG Worldwide PR North America, now called Havas PR (member of Euro RSCG Worldwide Executive Committee with oversight for global communications and reputation); became chairman, the Havas Global PR Collective in 2012

=== Media contributions ===
In 1998 in an interview with Fast Company magazine, Salzman drew attention to “experience collections,” the idea that people are placing less value on material goods and more on personal and professional experiences and skills.

The New York Times published a Sunday feature, “Metrosexuals Come Out,” which quoted Salzman regarding metrosexuals. In 2003 the UK Observer apologized for incorrectly attributing the first use of the term to Salzman, and gave credit to Mark Simpson (journalist) for the term.

In 2007, she talked about how “sleep is the new sex” for The Economist's annual predictions and stated that lowering home values would drive consumers away from recreational shopping and toward a “less is more” mindset.

== Activism ==
In 2015, Salzman signed an open letter which the ONE Campaign had been collecting signatures for; the letter was addressed to Angela Merkel and Nkosazana Dlamini-Zuma, urging them to focus on women as they serve as the head of the G7 in Germany and the AU in South Africa respectively.

== Personal life ==
Salzman relocated to Lausanne, Switzerland for the job with Philip Morris. She is married to Jim Diamond and formerly lived in Stamford, Connecticut.
