= Kkonminam =

South Korean term for an attractive young man

Kkonminam (Korean: 꽃미남; Hanja: 꽃美男;; from 꽃 (kkot, "flower") and 미남(美男) (minam, "handsome man")) has been commonly used in South Korea since the late 1990s to refer to men who are especially concerned with personal style, grooming and fashion. This lifestyle also includes the significant usage of cosmetics. Although they are sometimes regarded as bishōnen (androgynous), generally gender or sexual orientation is unambiguous.

== History ==
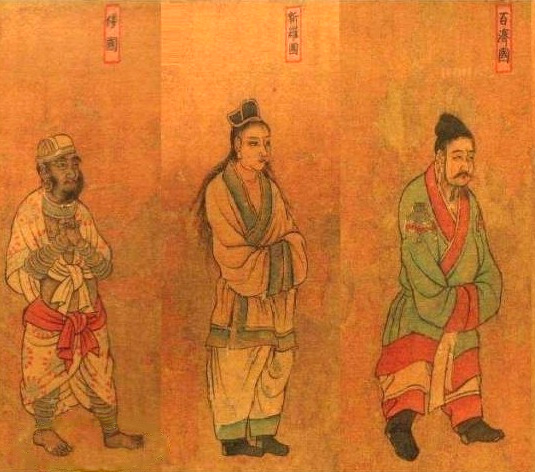
Damyeon-ribbon-wang-heedo (唐閻立本王會圖), China envoy to visit. left-to-right: Wa, Silla, Baekje Ambassador

The Hwarang, or "flower youths" or "flowering knights/gentlemen", were an elite group of male warriors in Silla, an ancient Korean kingdom. Chinese sources referred only to the physical beauty of the "flower boys" who were known for their androgynous good looks.

The word kkonminam is a neologism that was first used to describe "pretty boy characters from girls comics who regularly appeared against backgrounds filled with flowery patterns". The Korean kkonminam concept of soft masculinity originates from the Japanese concept of bishōnen in shōjo manga and anime, but, according to Sun Jung, with more purity, innocence and politeness.

The emergence of kkonminam was a socio-cultural phenomenon associated with the influence of Mandatory Military Service (strong and tall physical appeal) and Japanese entertainment's androgyny such as manga, dramas, beauty products and music (particularly visual-kei rock bands like X Japan and L'Arc-en-Ciel) in the 1990s. Even though Japanese popular culture was officially banned before 1998, Koreans gathered information in a variety of ways, mainly through underground personalized human networks, the internet, trips to Japan and piracy. H.O.T., a revolutionary K-pop group, credited for effeminating Korean masculinity, was heavily criticized at the time for borrowing Japanese style. Professor Kim Hyun Mee at Yonsei University attributes this to the growing independence and confidence of Asian women: "[they] can afford to be more selective when choosing a mate."

The National Security Act affected South Korea in the 1990s when restrictions were placed on international imports. Due to the Act, Korea experienced restrictions on television programming. Television companies turned instead to establishing channels such as Mnet in order to broadcast commercial programs such as K-pop. Mnet is a South Korean television music channel that has a variety of talk, game, and live music shows.

In the late 1990s, kkonminam images became notable in the Korean entertainment industry, glorifying "pretty" boys with smooth, fair skin, silky hair, and a feminine manner. These new images replaced the previous ones of tough and aggressive Korean men in television commercials, dramas, and on billboards. The Kkonminam phenomenon is prominent in Korean popular culture; it can be seen in fashion, music, photography, advertising, and television.

TikTok influencer Noen Eubanks identifies as a "flower boy".

=== Television ===
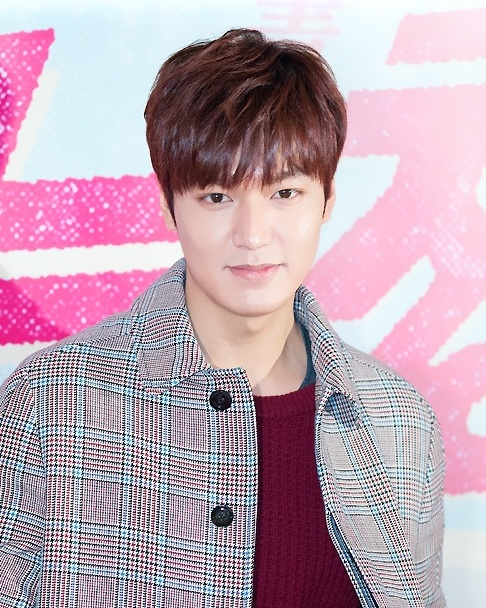
Lee Min Ho as the arrogant Gu Jun-Pyo in Boys over Flowers.

In 2009, a Korean television series called Boys over Flowers (based on Japanese shojo manga Hana Yori Dango) gained popularity in South Korea and across Asia. The plot follows an average high school girl who gets involved in the life of an arrogant rich boy and his friends. In Boys over Flowers: "the males have childlike and boyish features in contrast to their strong and muscular bodies. The popularity of the show influenced many South Korean men to take their appearance more seriously. An increasing number of South Korean males began applying cosmetics, wearing preppy and cruise-like outfits and sporting traditionally feminine looks, colors, and prints".

== Korean boy pop bands ==
Crystal S. Anderson, a Cultural Studies research scholar at Longwood University, found a variety of ways in which global fans refer to the unique masculinity of male K-pop groups. One respondent wrote: "I am also really curious about flower boys and the varying expressions of masculinity in Korean boy bands." Another respondent noted: "The first thing that attracted me when I was young is that Korean artists were exceptionally handsome/beautiful and possessed unique style, both in their music and fashion," linking appearance to a certain style.

=== Hybrid bands ===
Examples of Korean boy bands that exemplify this phenomenon are 2PM, Highlight, and MBLAQ. These bands draw on elements of "gangster" and hip-hop themes in their performances. The hybridized aspects help the bands appeal to broader audiences. Analysts note that these boy bands display masculinity of both kawaii and kkonminam elements. These boy bands test stereotypical masculinity.

Due to their tough masculine image, 2PM have been nicknamed by local Korean media and netizens as jimseung-dol (translating to "beast idol" in Korean). On-stage, they showcase theatrical manliness. In performances of "Heartbeat", the title song of their first studio album, they put on a hyper-masculine, beast-like performance. In the performances, Taecyeon tears off his shirt, Nichkhun symbolically rips out Taecyeon's heart in a brutal manner, and Chansung breathes fiercely while lifting Nichkhun over his head.

== See also ==
- Aegyo
- Bishōnen
- Himbo
- Hwarang
- Ikemen
- Little fresh meat
- Metrosexual – Western equivalent
- Moe
- Ulzzang
