= Celine (brand) =

French fashion brand

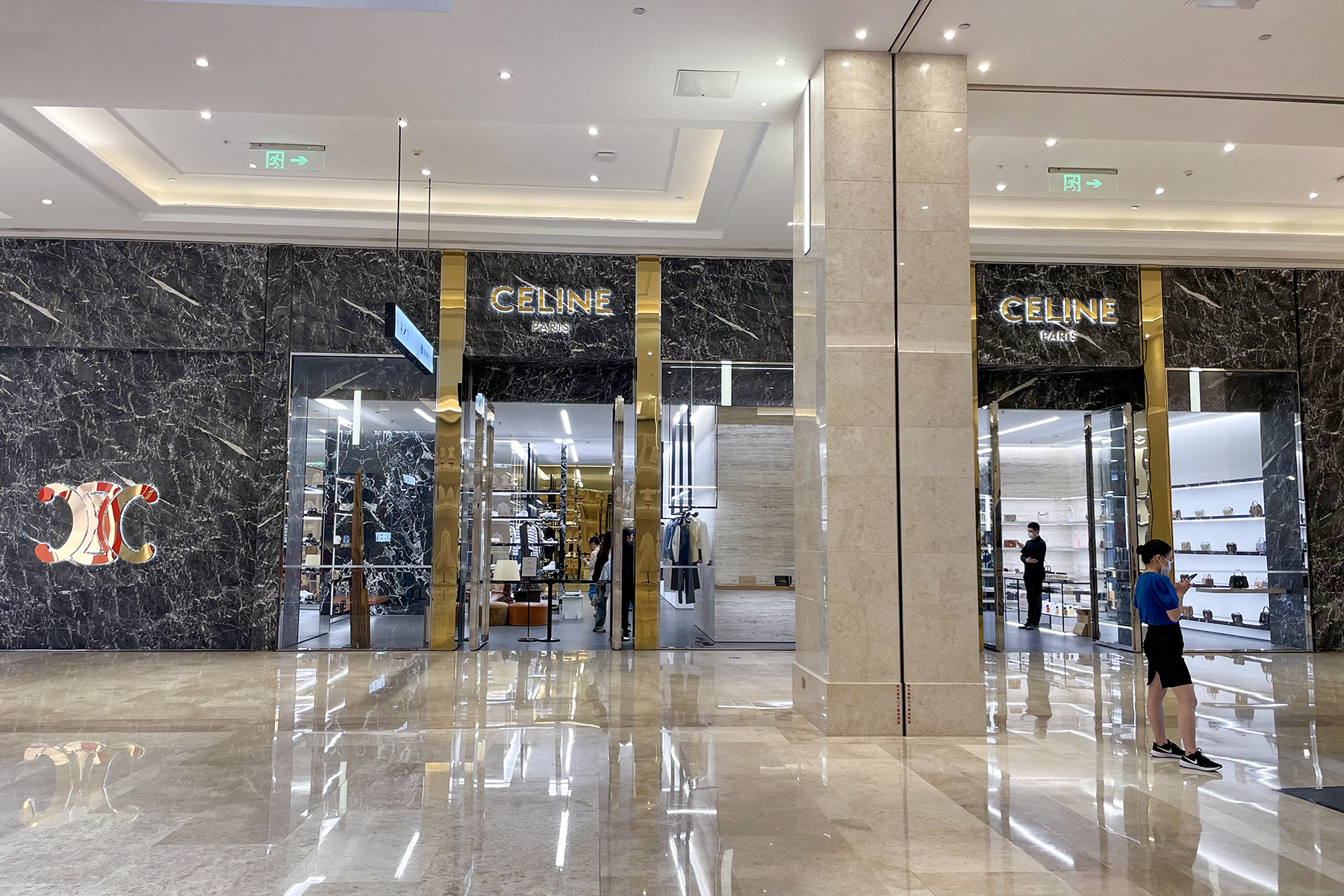
- Facade of the Celine boutique in Zhengzhou, China
- Type: Subsidiary
- Industry: Fashion
- Founded: 1945; 81 years ago
- Founder: Céline Vipiana
- Headquarters: 16 rue Vivienne, 75002, Paris, France
- Number of locations: 178 worldwide (2025)
- Key people: Michael Rider (Creative Director); Séverine Merle (CEO)
- Products: Haute couture; ready-to-wear; handbags; leather goods; perfume
- Number of employees: 2,500 (2026)
- Parent: LVMH
- Website: www.celine.com

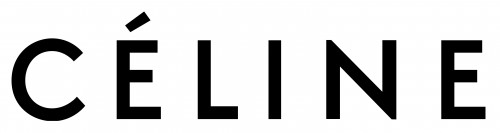
Former logo of Celine

Celine (formerly spelled Céline, stylized in all caps) is a French luxury fashion house founded in 1945 by fashion designer Céline Vipiana. The headquarters are located at 16 rue Vivienne in the 2nd arrondissement of Paris at the Hôtel Colbert de Torcy, which has French Historic Monument classification.

Séverine Merle has been the chief executive officer since April 2017. Michael Rider has been creative director of the brand since 2025 after the departure of Hedi Slimane in October 2024.

== History ==
=== Creation ===
In 1945, Céline Vipiana (1915–1997) and her husband, Richard, created one of the first luxury brands in the industry, Céline, a made-to-measure children's shoe business, and opened a first boutique at 52 rue Malte in Paris. The brand was recognised by its logo, the red elephant created by Raymont Peynet.

=== New positioning ===
In 1960, the brand altered its positioning by focusing its business on a ready-to-wear fashion brand for high society Parisian women. Henceforth, the brand specialized in artisanal leather goods such as handbags, loafers, gloves, and garments. Céline Vipiana remained the designer from 1945 until her retirement in 1988. In 1964, the launch of the new fragrance "Vent fou" and the new "American Sulky" collection of accessories gained success. The trench coat and Céline handbags became chief products of the house. Throughout the 1960s, Céline became known for the quality of its leather, and opened a leather goods boutique in Florence.

In 1973, Céline redesigned the logo with the intertwined "C" Sulky canvas, linked to the Arc-de-Triomphe, which appeared as a symbol for Parisians. At that time, Céline began its expansion in the world with the opening of various boutiques in Monte Carlo, Geneva, Hong Kong, Lausanne, Toronto and Beverly Hills. The brand's founders wished to be part of a charitable association, and Richard Vipiana established the Céline-Pasteur Prize, a sponsor for the American Hospital of Paris in 1973.

=== Acquisition by LVMH ===
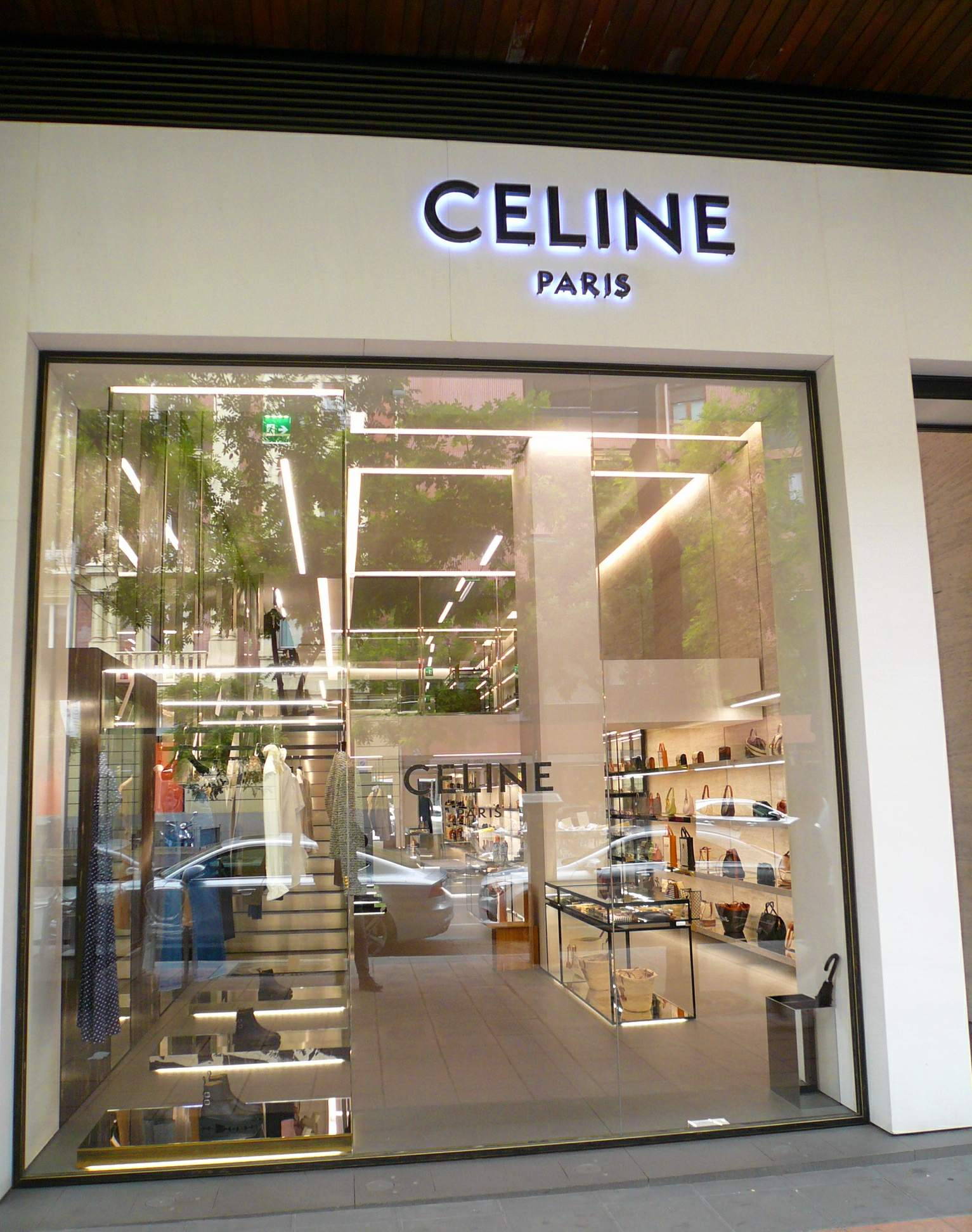
Celine boutique in Madrid, Spain

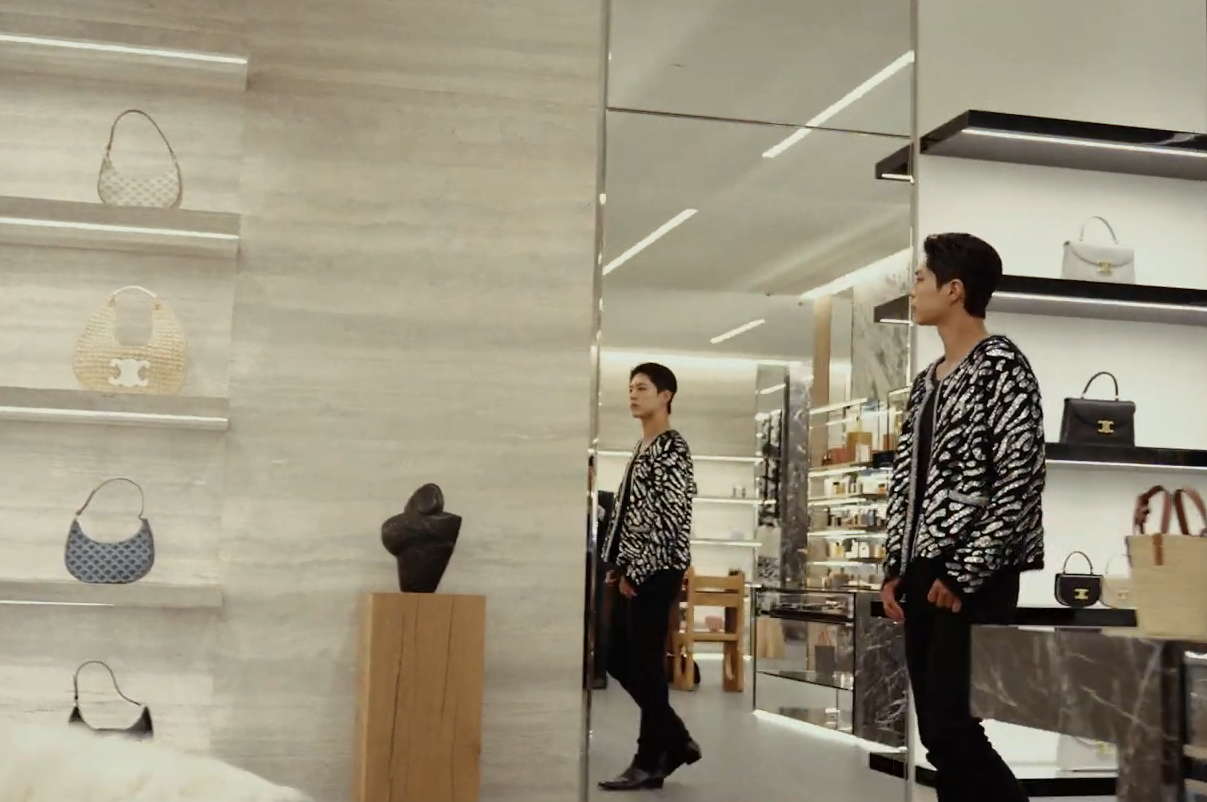
Global ambassador Park Bo-gum inside the Celine boutique in Taipei, Taiwan in 2024

Products on display in the brand's Hong Kong shop in 2022.

In 1987, with the approval of the Vipiana family, Bernard Arnault purchased a portion of Céline's capital. In 1996, the brand was integrated into the LVMH group for 2.7 billion French francs ($540 million). LVMH propelled the house to international fame with the opening of a flagship boutique at 36 avenue Montaigne in Paris.

== Creative directors ==
=== Early years ===
- 1988–1997: Peggy Huynh Kinh
- 1997–2003: Michael Kors
- 2004–2005: Roberto Menichetti
- 2005–2008: Ivana Omazic

=== Phoebe Philo, 2008–2018 ===
On September 4, 2008, the fashion portal Women's Wear Daily announced that Bernard Arnault, president of LVMH, had appointed Phoebe Philo as the new creative director of Céline. Philo's tenure at Céline began in October 2008. She presented her first ready-to-wear collection for Spring/Summer 2010 at Paris Fashion Week. Pierre-Yves Roussel, chief executive officer of LVMH’s fashion division, said that recruiting Philo was allowing her to express her vision. In 2009, Vogue defined her style as the “cool minimal trend”.

In 2010, Philo received the Designer of the Year award from British Fashion Council. In 2011, she was awarded International Designer of the Year by the Council of Fashion Designers of America. Both prizes were awarded for her work at Céline. In December 2017, Philo announced her departure from Céline after finishing the Fall 2018 collection, which was presented in March of that same year.

=== Hedi Slimane, 2018–2024 ===
On January 21, 2018, LVMH announced the appointment of Hedi Slimane as "artistic, creative and image director" in February. He directed all Céline collections, extending the brand's offering with the launch of men's fashion, couture, and fragrances.

Slimane's Céline studio was based in Los Angeles, with a prototype studio and an atelier in Paris. In September 2018, Slimane presented an updated Celine logo for the house. He created his retail flagship concept stores in Paris, Tokyo, Shanghai, Beverly Hills, Madrid, Milan and London. Slimane replaced the brand's traditional style with his signature "driven by youth culture, indie rock and sulking adolescence". Models included Noen Eubanks. Slimane exited the brand in October 2024.

=== Michael Rider, 2025–present ===
On October 2, 2024, Michael Rider was announced as the new creative director of Celine. Rider officially joined the company in early 2025. He is in charge of all Celine collections, ranging from leather goods to couture. Previously, Rider was the creative director for Ralph Lauren from 2018 to May 2024 and a senior designer for Balenciaga. He also worked as a design director at Celine during Phoebe Philo's tenure.

== CEOs ==
- 2000–2006: Jean-Marc Loubier
- 2006–2008: Serge Brunschwig
- 2008–2016: Marco Gobbetti
- 2016–2017: Pierre-Yves Roussel (ad interim)
- 2017–present: Séverine Merle

== Other activities ==
In 2000, Celine entered into a worldwide licensing agreement with De Rigo for its collection of sunglasses and frames for corrective eyewear. From 2011, the brand had a five-year licensing agreement with Safilo. From 2000 to 2011, Interparfums held the worldwide license for the development, creation, and distribution of Celine fragrance lines. The fragrance lines have since been managed in-house, beginning with Hedi Slimane's creative direction.

== Retail ==
Celine operates 178 boutiques worldwide and is available through a selective network including the luxury department stores Bergdorf Goodman (New York), Harrods (London), and Galeries Lafayette (Paris).

== Marketing ==
For its advertising campaigns, Celine has worked with notable photographers including Patrick Demarchelier (1998–2001) and Michael Thompson (2001). Its brand ambassadors have included singer Lisa (2020–2024), Park Bo-gum (since 2022; first actor global ambassador), singer V (since 2023), singer Danielle Marsh (since 2024), boy group TWS (since 2024), and actress Liu Shishi (since December 2024).
