= Little fresh meat =

Handsome young men in China

Little fresh meat (simplified Chinese: 小鲜肉; traditional Chinese: 小鮮肉; pinyin: xiǎoxiānròu) is a Chinese Internet buzzword used to describe handsome young men. It is most commonly used to refer to male celebrities, particularly rising stars.

== Positive impact ==
=== Star power and commercial value ===
This term has been widely used as a selling point by Chinese entertainment agencies in defining a star, and often helps the star in gaining more fans.

=== Box office ===
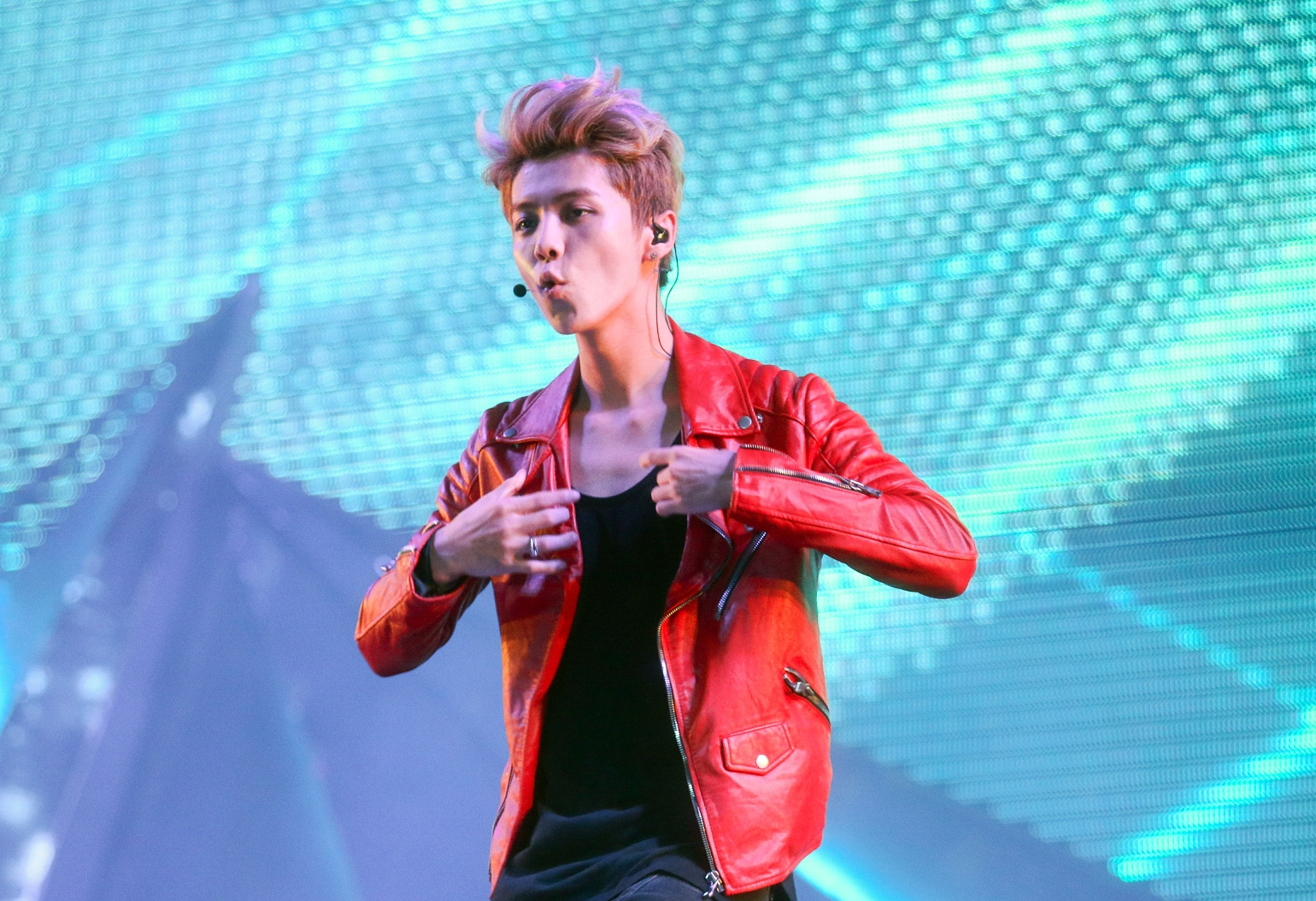
Lu Han, lead actor of Fighter of the Destiny

Films featuring "little fresh meat" have done well at the box office, in return for some of these films' low production cost. This is due to the devout fanbase of the stars. In particular, the media coined actor Lu Han's massive influence among his followers as the Lu Han effect, which helped achieve high ratings for the television drama Fighter of the Destiny in spite of poor reviews from critics.

=== Diversification of label ===
The popularity of "little fresh meat" has allowed the media to create new representations of male beauty on screen, thus diversifying the type of characters portrayed by actors in television and films. Males who possess delicate and feminine features are no longer met with contempt or ridicule.

== Negative criticism ==
=== State criticism ===
In 2018, an official Xinhua News Agency opinion piece criticized "fresh little meat" and called for a boycott of "harmful culture."

=== High salaries ===
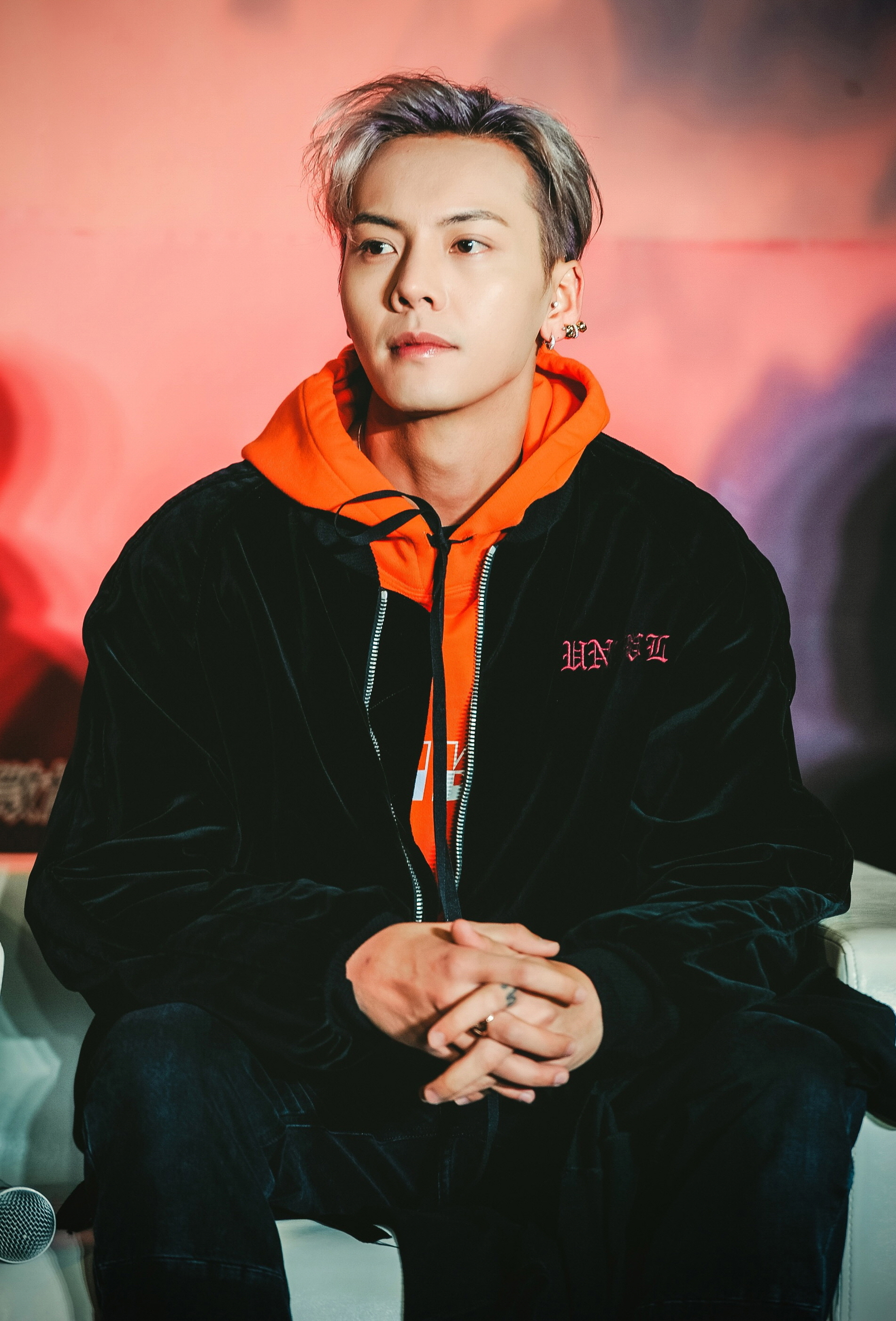
William Chan, one of China's most popular young stars

It has been reported that the high salaries demanded by some "little fresh meats" have caused a detrimental impact on film profits.

- The movies Somewhere Only We Know (2015) and Sweet Sixteen (2016) were highly dependent on leading actor Kris Wu's idol appeal. Yet while the first film grossed 286 million yuan, the latter dropped to 149 million.
- L.O.R.D: Legend of Ravaging Dynasties, which amassed some of the biggest names like Kris Wu, TFBoys, and William Chan, grossed only 382 million out of the forecasted 2 billion.

=== Unprofessional attitude ===
Some of the "little fresh meats" have often been criticized for their lack of acting skills, causing their films to receive negative reviews and online backlash. Li Yifeng was panned for not mastering the Beijing dialect for his role in Mr. Six, and received criticism for winning the Best Supporting Actor award at the Hundred Flowers Awards, which sparked a "Popularity vs Talent" controversy.

Other common unprofessional behaviour exhibited by "little fresh meats" include getting stand-ins to replace them in certain shots. Due to their popularity, they also tend to juggle multiple projects and do not give adequate time for each role, instead hiring stand-in look-alikes to replace them in shots that do not require close ups.

=== Quality ===
- Time Raiders, based on the popular novel Daomu Biji and featuring Chinese heartthrobs Jing Boran and Lu Han, earned 1 billion yuan at the box office but received overwhelming negative reviews from critics in China.
- The People's Liberation Army Daily criticized the unrealistic portrayals by some of these young actors in military-themed films.

== In the media ==
=== Empowerment of women ===
As the term "little fresh meat" has been used by women to express their desire or hunger for young, good-looking men, a psychologist stated that it is a progress for women to recognize their sexual needs and self-gratification in the otherwise restrained society in China.

=== Commercial trends ===
The popularity of the "little fresh meat" has also resulted in a change in beauty and cosmetic companies, which have increasingly begun to use young male celebrities to endorse their products instead of female celebrities.

== People associated with the title ==
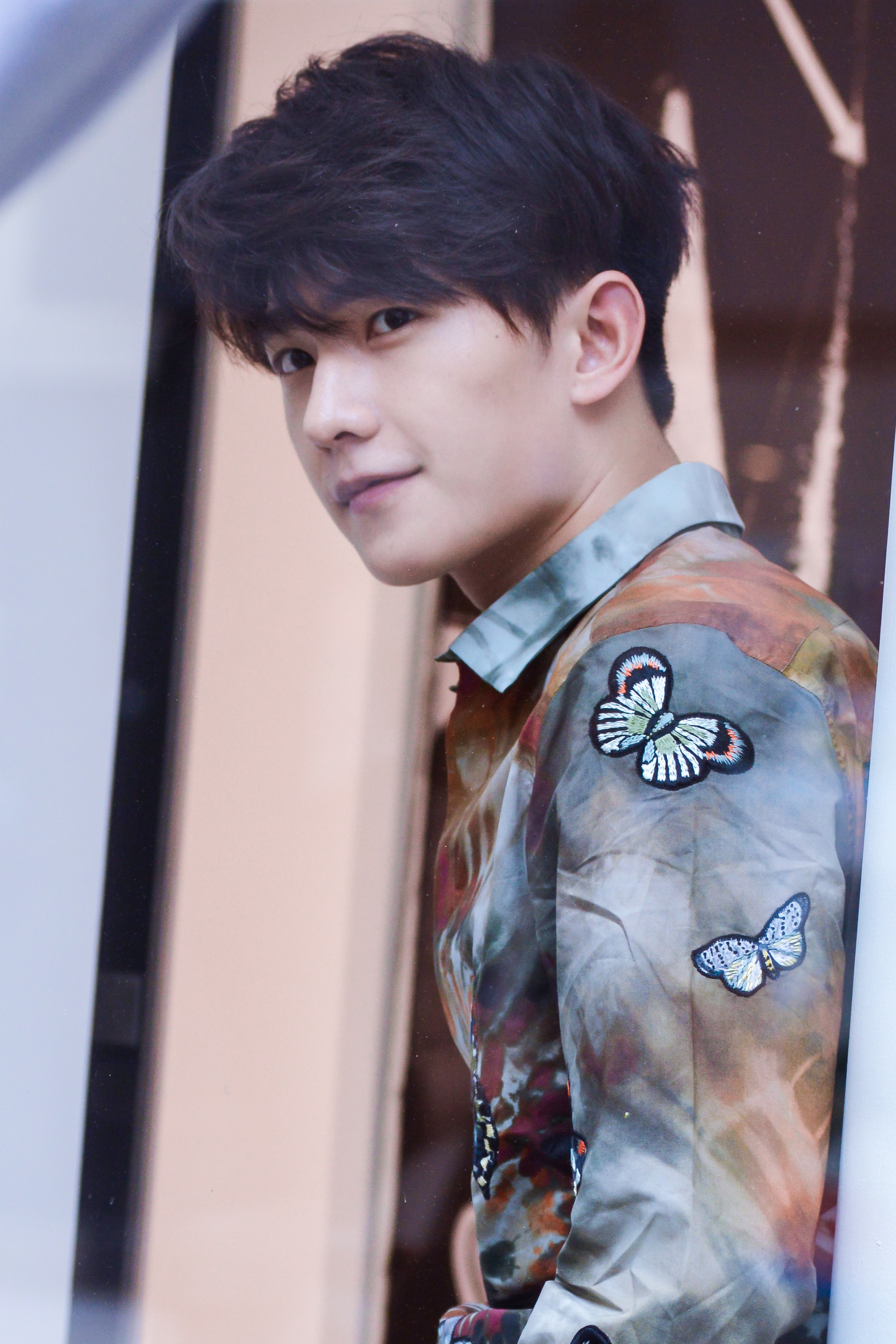
Yang Yang, lead actor of popular series Love O2O

- William Chan (born 1985), singer and actor
- Li Yifeng (born 1987), singer and actor
- Jing Boran (born 1989), singer and actor
- Lu Han (born 1990), singer and actor
- Chen Xuedong (born 1990), singer and actor
- Kris Wu (born 1990), singer and actor
- Yang Yang (born 1991), singer and actor
- Zhang Yixing (born 1991), singer and actor
- Oho Ou (born 1992), Actor
- Huang Zitao (born 1993), singer and actor
- Ning Zetao (born 1993), athlete
- Cai Xukun (born 1998), singer
- Liu Haoran (born 1997), actor
- Leo Wu (born 1999), actor
- TFBoys, boy band
- Xiao Zhan (born 1991), actor, singer
- Wang Yibo (born 1997), actor, singer, dancer, motorcycle rider
- Li Zhenning (born 1995), actor, singer

== See also ==
- Bishōnen
- Kkonminam
- Twink
