= ChooxTV =

Filipino gaming content creator (born 1991)

Personal information
- Born: Edgar Dumali; 1991 (age 34–35)
- Nationality: Filipino

Career information
- Game: Mobile Legends: Bang Bang; Honor of Kings
- Role: Content creator
- Years active: 2017–present

TikTok information
- Page: Choox TV
- Genre: Gaming
- Followers: 8.1 million

YouTube information
- Channel: ChooxTV
- Years active: 2017–present
- Genre: Gaming
- Subscribers: 6.53 million
- Views: 1.1 billion
- Last updated: November 18, 2026

Edgar Dumali (born 1991), professionally known as ChooxTV (sometimes stylized as CHoOxTV), is a Filipino gaming streamer and content creator.

== Early life ==
Hailing from South Cotabato, Philippines, Edgar Dumali grew up in poverty. He worked several odd jobs to support himself, including stints as a construction worker and a tricycle driver while combating addiction in mobile gaming.

== Career ==
=== Streaming and content creation ===
Edgar Dumali streams under the name ChooxTV in Facebook Gaming and YouTube since 2017. He is known for using a voice filter in his streams, revealing his actual voice upon reaching 1 million subscribers. He became famous for his "dogshow" (comedic and nonsensical) style of streaming. He is best known for his "unorthodox" gameplay, frequently using heroes in roles they were not intended for, such as "Marksman Estes" or a "Tank Layla" build.

He joined the talent gaming agency Royale Rumble in 2019.

Dumali has used his platform for charitable causes on multiple occasions such as fundraising livestreams for victims of the 2019 Cotabato earthquakes and the Taal Volcano eruption in January 2020.

In 2020, Dumali was ranked as the 6th top YouTube creator in the Philippines, joining the ranks of major influencers like Ivana Alawi and Cong TV. In 2021, he was honored at the MLBB Awards Gala, receiving the "Streamer of the Year" award alongside professional players like Yawi and H2wo. He was signed as a brand ambassador for Minana Esports's Ampverse in 2022.

In September 2024, Dumali announced a transition to the game Honor of Kings, joining the official influencer roster to help promote the game's launch in the Philippines.

=== Aborted esports stint with Onic PH ===
In July 2022, Dumali joined the professional esports team, Onic Philippines for MPL Philippines Season 10. He sat out Onic PH's first three games for Season 10 before Onic PH officially released him from the roster on August 25, 2022.

The league subsequently imposed a fine on Onic PH for "unilaterally" and "arbitrarily" terminating Dumali's contract. Onic later explained that it and Dumali had a hard time to comply with Moonton's requirements; specifically location-based issue. Dumali is based in South Cotabato while Onic usually does its training bootcamp in Manila. Despite of this Onic PH expressed that it is willing to work with Dumali once again if the streamer is able to sort his schedule.

== Personal life ==
Dumali is married to a fellow content creator who goes by the handle "ChiKai". He has three children. His wife almost left him due to neglecting his duties as a father due to gaming. However Dumali later decide to focus using his streaming earnings to support his family financially.

Dumali is able to fund construct a two-storey house for his family from his streaming career. He is estimated to earn around ₱765,000–12.25 million monthly as of 2020.
