= Mixer (service) =

Defunct live streaming video platform

- Website type: Streaming video
- Available in: 21 languages
- List of languages: Simplified Chinese; Traditional Chinese; Danish; Dutch; English (British and American); Finnish; French; German; Italian; Japanese; Korean; Norwegian; Polish; Portuguese (European and Brazilian); Russian; Spanish (European and Mexican); Swedish; Turkish
- Founded: January 5, 2016; 10 years ago
- Dissolved: June 22, 2020; 6 years ago
- Successor: Facebook Gaming
- Owner: Microsoft
- Founders: Matthew Salsamendi; James Boehm
- Parent: Microsoft Teams
- Website: mixer.com (Redirects to Facebook Gaming)
- Commercial: Yes

Mixer was an American video game live streaming platform. The service launched on January 5, 2016, as Beam, under the ownership of co-founders Matthew Salsamendi and James Boehm. The service placed an emphasis on interactivity, with low stream latency and a platform for allowing viewers to perform actions that can influence a stream.

The service was acquired by Microsoft in August 2016, after which it was renamed Mixer in 2017 and integrated into Microsoft's Xbox division (including top-level integration on Xbox One). In 2019, Mixer gained attention when it signed two top streamers from its main competitor, Twitch—Ninja and Shroud—to a contract with the service.

However, citing an inability to scale its operations, Microsoft partnered with Facebook Gaming as a part of its Windows gaming suite. Microsoft began transitioning Windows users from Mixer to Facebook Gaming by the end of July 22. Subsequently, Windows streamers transitioned from Mixer to Facebook Gaming by the end of July 22, and Mixer was shut down on July 22, 2020.

== Features ==
Mixer used a low-latency streaming protocol known as FTL ("Faster Than Light"); the service states that this protocol only creates delays of less than a second between the original broadcast and when it is received by users, rather than 10–20 seconds, making it more appropriate for real-time interactivity between a streamer and their viewers. In addition, viewers can use buttons below a stream to interact with it, including voting, special effects, and influencing gameplay. Some interactions required users to spend "Sparks"—a currency accumulated by watching a channel. A second paid currency known as "Embers" was later added, similar to Twitch's "Bits" system; "Embers" could be used to purchase animated chat effects called "Skills". An SDK was available to integrate games with this system.

In April 2019, Mixer added "Channel Progression"—a level system for tracking users' engagement with a particular channel over time. Users could receive benefits to reward their long-term participation. Mixer's features also included CATbot, an auto chat filtration bot that helped remove unwanted chat content on streamers’ channels before chat ever saw it. CATbot's moderation level could be adjusted for all viewers or could be set according to viewers’ rank in Channel Progression.

Mixer offered a subscriptions system similar to Twitch for partnered channels, which allowed access to exclusive emoticons, and adds a badge to the user's name in chat commemorate their support. Initially, these were priced at US$5.99 per month. In October 2019, Mixer announced that the price would be lowered to $4.99, matching the price of subscriptions on Twitch.

== History ==
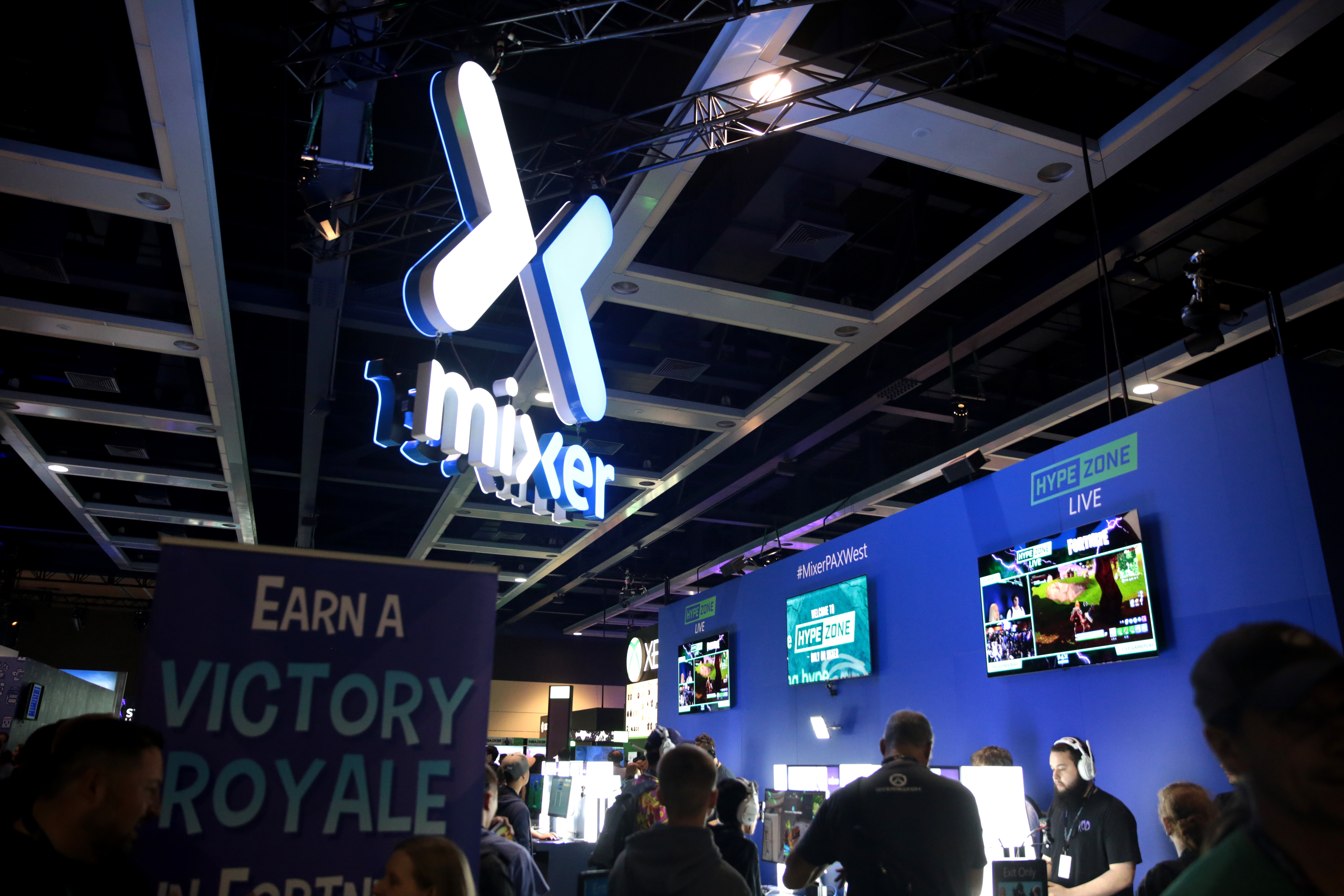
The Mixer booth at the 2018 Penny Arcade Expo in Seattle

Beam launched on January 5, 2016. In May 2016, Beam won the Startup Battlefield competition at the TechCrunch Disrupt conference, receiving $50,000 in equity-free funding.

On August 11, 2016, Beam was acquired by Microsoft for an undisclosed amount. The service's team was integrated into the Xbox division. On October 26, 2016, Microsoft announced that Beam would be integrated into Windows 10. Beam broadcasting was also integrated into Xbox One on the March 2017 software update.

On May 25, 2017, Microsoft announced that Beam had been renamed Mixer, as the previous name could not be used globally. The re-branding came alongside the introduction of several new features, such as the ability for a user to co-host up to three other streams on their channel at once, as well as the companion mobile app Mixer Create. It was also announced that Mixer would receive top-level integration within the Xbox One dashboard, with a new tab curating Mixer streams.

On July 31, 2019, video game streamer Ninja announced that he would move exclusively from Twitch to Mixer beginning August 1. The deal was considered to be a major coup for Mixer, as Ninja had been among Twitch's top personalities, with over 14 million followers. His wife and manager Jessica Blevins stated that the contract with Twitch had encumbered his ability to "grow his brand" outside of gaming, and that his interest in streaming had been deteriorating due to the perceived "toxicity" of Twitch's community.

A report by Streamlabs and Newzoo reported that in the third quarter of 2019, Mixer had a 188% quarter-by-quarter increase in the amount of unique hours of content being streamed on the service, but that the percentage of concurrent viewers had fallen by 11.7%. Mixer founders Boehm and Salsamendi both left Microsoft in October 2019. The same month, streamer Shroud also entered into an exclusivity agreement with Mixer, followed shortly afterward by KingGothalion.

On June 22, 2020, citing a poor market share and inability to scale in comparison to competing services, Microsoft announced that Mixer would be shut down on July 22, 2020. As part of an agreement to collaborate with Facebook, Inc. (now Meta Platforms, Inc.) on aspects of its xCloud cloud gaming service, Mixer would redirect users to the Facebook Gaming service after it ceased operations, and some partnered streamers offered opportunities to join equivalent Facebook Gaming programs where applicable. Outstanding subscriptions and Embers were converted to Microsoft Store credit. Mixer's employees were transferred to the Microsoft Teams division. Meta Platforms, Inc. holds rights to Mixer trademarks.

Attempting to visit mixer.com now results in a redirect to Facebook Gaming. Microsoft released its contracts with exclusively-signed streamers; in August, Ninja held a stream on YouTube before returning to Twitch, while Shroud re-signed exclusively with Twitch.
