= Noen Eubanks =

American model and influencer

- Born: Georgia, United States
- Occupations: Model, influencer

Noen Eubanks is an American model and influencer best known for his content on TikTok and his modeling work. He became known outside of social media when he was selected to star in a campaign for Celine.

== Biography ==
Eubanks was born in Georgia, but when he was one year old moved to Hawaii. After a few years, his family returned to Loganville, Georgia. He also briefly lived in Texas as a child before returning to Georgia.

Eubanks began using TikTok in 2018, when he created a video to send to his brother. A month after posting the video, he returned to find it had been viewed 100 times. He soon began becoming active on TikTok, posting eight times a day at first.

He has been described as a soft boy, but prefers to describe himself as a flower boy. He is also known for his multicolored hairstyles and his "authentic style". He has stated that being on TikTok gave him the confidence to wear makeup, dyed hair, and "crazy" clothes.

He launched his own clothing line, "Not Noen". In 2019, he had over 7.5 million TikTok followers and 2.2 million Instagram followers.

He became known outside of TikTok upon being selected as the face of a Celine campaign in December 2019, where he was described as a "teen idol". The campaign featured black and white portraits of Eubanks in his crop top and various Celine jackets. He also participated in the launch of Celine's 2020 "Dancing Kid" collection.

He was the face of KyraTV in 2019. He was tapped by Facebook Gaming in 2020. He was featured in an Amiri campaign in 2025. As of 2025, he also identified as an indie game developer.
