= Michael Rider =

American fashion designer

- Born: Washington D.C.
- Education: Brown University
- Labels: Ralph Lauren (2018–2024); Celine (2025–)

Michael Rider is an American fashion designer. Since 2025, he is the creative director of Celine, succeeding Hedi Slimane.

== Early life and education ==
Rider was raised in Washington D.C. He attended Brown University's class 2002.

== Career ==
Rider worked as a senior designer at Balenciaga from 2004 to 2008 under Nicolas Ghesquière . From 2008 to 2018 he worked under Phoebe Philo as design director of ready-to-wear at Celine. He joined Ralph Lauren in 2018 as creative director, where he worked until May 2024.
