= Glenn Belverio =

American journalist and editor

Glenn Belverio (born 1966) is an American journalist and editor based in New York, New York.

In the 1990s, Belverio was a filmmaker and performance artist, whose 1993 collaboration with best-selling author Camille Paglia on the short film Glennda and Camille Do Downtown, gained international attention. The film played at the Sundance Film Festival and won first prize for best short documentary at the Chicago Underground Film Festival.

In this and other films of the 1990s, Belverio appeared on screen in the drag persona of Glennda Orgasm. Laurence Senelick, writing about female impersonation in "The Cambridge Guide to Theater", said that Belverio's performances as Glennda represented a radical edge in gay culture at the time, "as the politically correct gay community turned its back on drag." Through these performances, Belverio was thought to be engaging in the kind of political and cultural critique that Paglia termed "drag queen feminism".

In 1996 a retrospective of Belverio's film and video work was held at Institute of Contemporary Arts in London, and marked the end of his career as a filmmaker. Shortly thereafter, his articles on the New York fashion scene began appearing in various publications such as Dutch, Zoo, i-D, Index, and Glue. Belverio has been a guest-editor and writer for the Asian culture and fashion magazine WestEast and worked between China and New York from 2002 to 2004. He won the award for editorial excellence from the Society of Publishers for his work on WestEast's "POP" and "SEX" issues in 2003.

His book "Confessions from the Velvet Ropes: The Glamorous, Grueling Life of Thomas Onorato, New York's Top Club Doorman" was published by St. Martin's Press in summer 2006. Rob Sheffield of Rolling Stone wrote: "Confessions from the Velvet Ropes is like a surreal mash-up of Party Girl and Apocalypse Now, or Please Kill Me and Night of the Living Dead. It's packed with absurdly juicy war stories from the velvet goldmine of New York clubland, down and dirty yet screamingly funny tales from the door-bitch jungle, full of crazed revelers, wasted starlets, fashion pimps, and sex behind the ice machine. Brilliant stuff."

Belverio was a guest on ABC News Now in December 2006 to discuss his book. Currently, he is a regular contributor to Diane Pernet's blog "A Shaded View on Fashion".

== Preservation and touring (2020–present) ==
In the 2020s, Belverio experienced a career resurgence following the digitization and preservation of his 1990s public-access video catalog by the Video Data Bank. Belverio began touring internationally with a curated program titled GLENNDA AND FRIENDS: Queer Videos from the '90s, which compiles episodes of The Brenda and Glennda Show and Glennda and Friends. These retrospectives, highlighting the era's street-level drag activism, have screened at major institutions and independent art spaces, including the Museum of Modern Art and MoMA PS1 in October 2025, the Walker Art Center in May 2024, Epsilon Spires in April 2024, the British Film Institute in March 2026 and the National Gallery of Art in Washington DC in 2023. Screenings frequently feature live panel discussions and talkbacks with Belverio.

== Legacy and dramatization ==
Belverio's 1990s drag persona, Glennda Orgasm, and his documentation of Joan Jett Blakk's 1992 presidential campaign were dramatized in the play Ms. Blakk for President, co-written by Academy Award-winning playwright Tarell Alvin McCraney (best known for Moonlight) and Tina Landau. In the 2026 New York Off-Broadway production at the Vineyard Theatre, directed by Landau, the character of Glennda Orgasm was portrayed by actor Kelvin Moon Loh. On November 20, 2026, Belverio participated in a post-show panel discussion at the Vineyard Theatre titled Those Who Were There, moderated by Landau alongside drag historian Joe E. Jeffreys and journalist Tracy Baim.

== Books ==
- Confessions from the Velvet Ropes: The Glamorous, Grueling Life of Thomas Onorato, New York's Top Club Doorman (2006) ISBN 0-312-35459-2
- Vamps and Tramps by Camille Paglia (1994) (transcript of Glennda and Camille Do Downtown)
- Anti-Gay by Mark Simpson (1996) (transcript of A Case for the Closet, co-written by Belverio and Bruce LaBruce)
