= Spornosexual =

Portmanteau of sports, porn and metrosexual

Spornosexual is a blend of sports and the clipping porno, compounded with sexual. The term was coined by Mark Simpson in 2014 to describe a man "who is influenced in his appearance by the stars of sport and pornography". It recognises young men who use "their toned bodies on social media as a means of feeling valuable in society." Jamie Hakim has described this as a "power-shift of a segment of society who have historically defined themselves through their mind, whilst at the same time defining those they have subordinated - such as women - through their bodies".

Simpson also coined the term metrosexual in 1994.

== Details ==
The term originated in an article by cultural commentator Mark Simpson in 2014; Simpson's metrosexual is a portmanteau of metropolitan and heterosexual. He describes spornosexuals as frequently working class men who exercise at a gym in order to share eroticised selfies of their toned bodies on social media. Simpson considers spornosexuality as the second, more extreme, generation of metrosexuality, since the "uptake by men of products, practises and pleasures previously ring-fenced for women and gay men" has become normalised. Instead, Simpson claims, spornosexual men want to be recognised for their bodies rather than their clothes. Examples of such men include Dan Osborne, Thom Evans, David McIntosh and Cristiano Ronaldo.

Jamie Hakim's research, "The Spornosexual: the affective contradictions of male body-work in neoliberal digital culture", was published in the Journal of Gender Studies in 2016. Hakim writes that young men defining their value through their body is a response to the effects of austerity on them since 2008, when the ability to create value through other means became harder. "This is all the more surprising because this use of body-image to derive social value has long been associated with groups men tended to be viewed as inferior." HuffPost said this research "went as far as blaming the financial crisis for the rise of the 'Spornosexual'".

Greg Wolfman has written about a proliferation of men's "consumer lifestyles", or "marketed manhoods", that includes spornosexual with lumbersexual and hipster.

== See also ==
- Body worship – Submissive act pertaining to BDSM
- Narcissism – Self-centered personality style
- Self-brand – Process in which consumers match their self-concept with that of a specific brand image
