= Facebook Gaming =

Video game livestreaming platform

Facebook
- Website type: Live streaming; Video on demand
- Available in: 112 languages
- List of languages Multilingual; Afrikaans, Albanian, Amharic, Arabic, Armenian, Assamese, Azerbaijani, Basque, Belarusian, Bengali, Bosnian, Breton, Bulgarian, Burmese, Catalan, Cebuano, Corsican, Croatian, Czech, Danish, Dutch, Dutch (België), English (UK), English (US), English (upside down), Esperanto, Estonian, Faroese, Filipino, Finnish, French (Canada), French (France), Frisian, Fula, Galician, Georgian, German, Greek, Guarani, Gujarati, Haitian Creole, Hausa, Hebrew, Hindi, Hungarian, Icelandic, Indonesian, Irish, Italian, Japanese, Japanese (Kansai), Javanese, Kannada, Kazakh, Khmer, Kinyarwanda, Korean, Kurdish (Kurmanji), Kyrgyz, Lao, Latvian, Lithuanian, Macedonian, Malagasy, Malay, Malayalam, Maltese, Marathi, Mongolian, Nepali, Norwegian (bokmal), Norwegian (nynorsk), Odia, Pashto, Persian, Polish, Portuguese (Brazil), Portuguese (Portugal), Punjabi, Romanian, Russian, Sardinian, Serbian, Shona, Silesian, Simplified Chinese (China), Sinhala, Slovak, Slovenian, Somali, Sorani Kurdish, Spanish, Spanish (Spain), Swahili, Swedish, Syriac, Tajik, Tamazight, Tamil, Tatar, Telugu, Tetun, Thai, Traditional Chinese (Hong Kong), Traditional Chinese (Taiwan), Turkish, Ukrainian, Urdu, Uzbek, Vietnamese, Welsh and Zaza
- Predecessor: Mixer
- Area served: Worldwide, except blocking countries
- Owner: Meta Platforms
- Founders: Mark Zuckerberg; Dustin Moskovitz; Chris Hughes; Andrew McCollum; Eduardo Saverin
- CEO: Mark Zuckerberg
- Website: fb.gg/play
- Registration: Required (to do any activity)
- Users: ▲800 millions monthly active users (as of April 2018)
- Launched: June 1, 2018; 8 years ago in Cambridge, Massachusetts, US
- Current status: Active
- Written in: C++, Hack (as HHVM) and PHP

Facebook Gaming is Facebook's gaming-focused live streaming service. Facebook launched it officially on June 1, 2018 as a tab on the Facebook app and a standalone app.

The service became successful in Southeast Asia and has produced internet celebrities like ChooxTV in the Philippines.

== History ==
In August 2016, Facebook partnered with Blizzard Entertainment to expand its Facebook Live streaming service to gaming with integration into Battle.net's client. In March 2017, Facebook allowed users to stream games from their desktop personal computers. In December, support to stream Facebook Instant Games was added.

A software developer kit for game developer was released in March 2018.

In 2019, Jeremy "DisguisedToast" Wang was signed to Facebook Gaming. Soon after, Facebook also signed Super Smash Bros. streamer Gonzalo "ZeRo" Barrios. In 2020, they signed influencer Noen Eubanks.

On February 18, 2020, Ronda Rousey performed her first live stream on Facebook Gaming, announcing that she will stream once per week. The details of her contract were not disclosed. On April 20, 2020, Facebook launched its gaming app to more countries. On June 22, 2020, Microsoft announced that it would discontinue its Mixer streaming service, and redirect users (including partnered streamers) to Facebook Gaming. In return, there would be integrations with Facebook Gaming and Microsoft's xCloud cloud gaming service.

In August 2022, Meta announced that it was shutting down its standalone gaming app, but users could still play games by going to the gaming tab in the main Facebook app.
