= Ikemen =

Japanese term used to refer to attractive men

The term ikemen (Japanese: イケメン) is a slang term used to describe good-looking men in Japanese pop culture.

The word is a portmanteau neologism derived from the Japanese words ikeru (いける) or iketeru and menzu (メンズ). Ikeru and iketeru mean "cool", "good", and "exciting", while menzu is the Japanization of "men". This term has been sometimes jokingly written as "EK面" in internet slang.

Ikemen are typically characterized as being sharply dressed individuals with deep-set, slender, and intelligent-looking eyes; husky voices; slender wrists and fingers; a manly build; an unruffled appearance; pale skin; and clean smelling with an air of mystery around them. Ikemen are typically reserved with the ability to become passionate in their interests with the impression that they are literary geniuses.

== History ==
According to the now-defunct Japanese gay magazine G-men, the terms ikeru and iketeru, meaning "cool", were used to describe attractive men in the gay community of the mid-1990s; the original forms were ikeru menzu and iketeru menzu, both meaning "cool men". Later that decade, in the women's fashion magazine Egg, editor Tomoko Yano started a column, Kurikuri Yano's Iketeru Men (Goggle-Eyed Yano's Cool Men), which focused on attractive men. By 1999, the name of the column had been collapsed to Ikemen.

The concept of ikemen and older, masculine men may have stemmed from a stylized transformation of the wakashu aesthetic of a beautiful boy-like nobleman during the Edo period in kabuki plays.

== In media ==
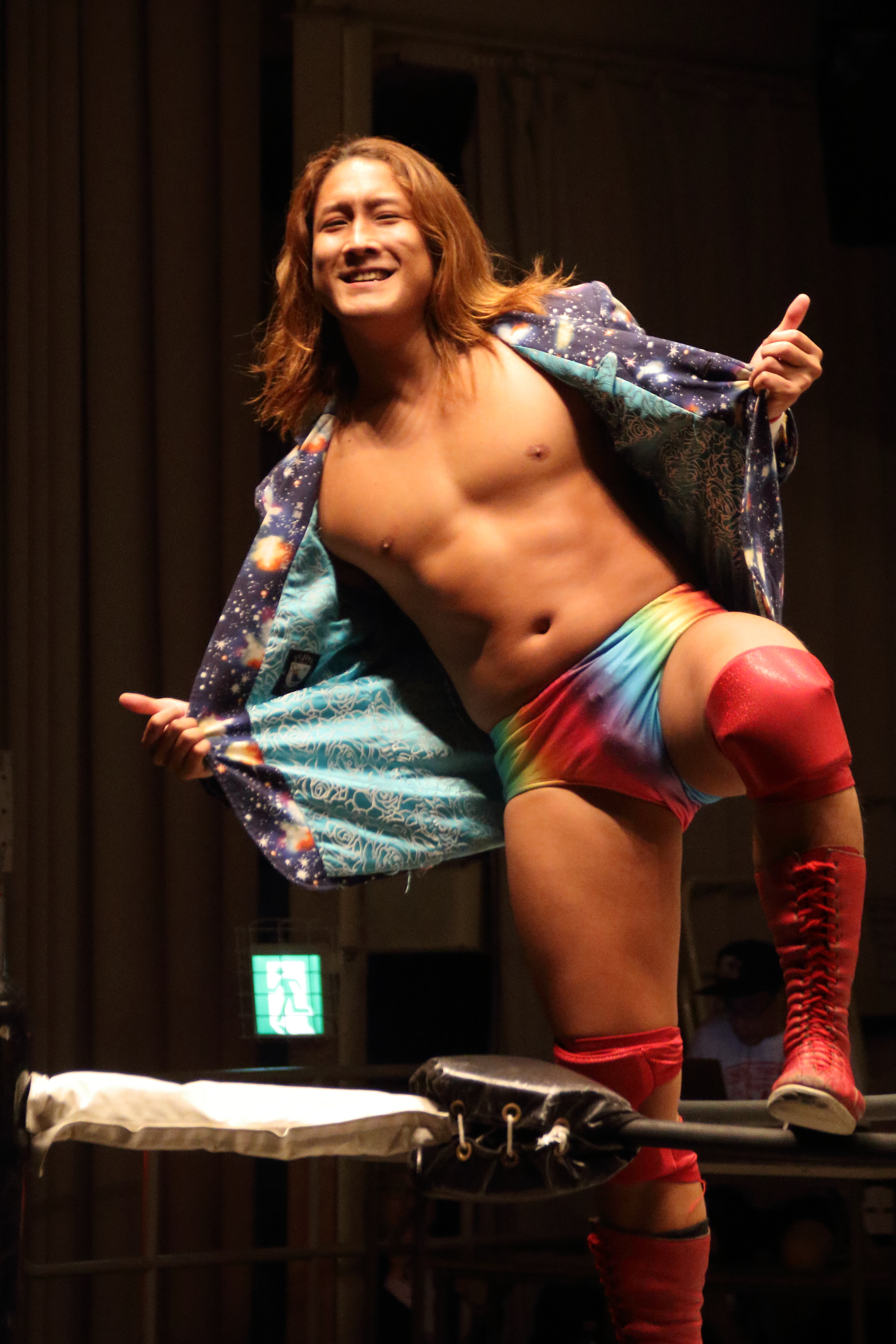
Professional wrestler Sojiro Higuchi has adopted the character of "Jiro Kuroshio", heavily influenced by Ikemen culture.

The concept of ikemen has been developed for various Japanese dramas such as Ikemen desu ne (美男ですね) and Korean dramas such as Winter Sonata (겨울연가), and Stairway to Heaven (천국의 계단). Unlike popular men in American culture who are popular due to their outstanding physical and personal attributes, ikemen often focus on “feminine” qualities that balance out masculine qualities of a good looking man. Ikemen in Korean and Japanese dramas are showcased as having patience, gentleness, and the ability to self-sacrifice for the woman they love while being able to express a wide range of human emotion. These traits are seen as desirable, as Japanese culture finds clever, self-centered, and larger than life figures to be both intimidating and appealing.

Ikemen characters are seen in various genres of anime and manga, especially in dating simulations and visual novels for women (also known as otome games). Men in visual novels such as Hakouki: Demon of the Fleeting Blossom (薄桜鬼 〜新選組奇譚〜) and manga such as Ikemen Paradise (花ざかりの君たちへ イケメン♂パラダイス) often are portrayed as mysterious, strong, damaged, and passionate men who often have a throng of female admirers.

Professional wrestler Jiro Kuroshio portrays an Ikemen character, reflected in his ring attire, hair, wrestling style and mannerisms. He has also adopted "Ikemen" as part of his ring name.

== See also ==
- Bishōnen
- Kkonminam
- Ulzzang
- Fujoshi
