= Mark Simpson (journalist) =

British journalist

- Born: York, England
- Occupations: Writer, reporter, commentator
- Website: marksimpson.com

Mark Simpson is an English journalist, writer, and broadcaster specialising in popular culture, media, and masculinity. Simpson is the originator of the term and concept metrosexual. He has been described by one critic as "the skinhead Oscar Wilde". David Bowie referred to being metrosexual in an interview on the Dinah Shore show in the year 1976, the video is available on YouTube.

== Career ==
Simpson has written for The Times, The Guardian, Salon, Arena Homme +, GQ Style, Vogues Hommes International, The Independent on Sunday, Têtu, the Seattle Stranger, and Dutch Playboy. In December 2007, GQ Russia placed him in their 'Top Ten Things That Changed Men's Lives'.

== The term metrosexual ==
Mark Simpson is credited with coining the term metrosexual in a 1994 article for The Independent. He also introduced the word to the US in 'Meet the Metrosexual', a much-quoted essay on Salon.com in 2002, leading to the global popularity of the term. This was also the first citation of the UK footballer David Beckham as the ultimate example of the type. Simpson was later credited with introducing the term 'retrosexual' (in the sense of the anti-metrosexual) in 2003.

Described as one of the "Ideas of the Year" by The New York Times in 2006, Simpson wrote on the issue of sport and advertising increasingly using homoerotic imagery, in a process he dubbed "sporno" ("the place where sport and porn meet and produce a gigantic money shot"). Simpson wrote about "sporno" for Out magazine commenting that: "whole new generation of young bucks, from twinky soccer players like Manchester United's Alan Smith and Cristiano Ronaldo to rougher prospects like Chelsea's Joe Cole and AC Milan's Kak', keen to emulate their success, are actively pursuing sex-object status in a postmetrosexual, increasingly pornolized world." The London Times newspaper also featured sporno in their 'Year in Ideas' list.

In 2010, the global trend spotting website Science of the Time described Simpson as "the world's most perceptive writer about masculinity". The Times of India included 'metrosexual' in their review of the most important words of the last thirty years, commenting: "Much has been written about metrosexuals, but no one has done it as well as the man credited with coining the term, Mark Simpson."

In 2014, Simpson proposed that the age of the metrosexual has passed and is evolving into a new kind of man called the spornosexual. Spornosexual is a neologism, also coined by Simpson, combining the words "sport," "porn," and "metrosexual." It describes an aesthetic adopted by some men who consume both sports and pornography. Such men, in addition to possessing certain metrosexual attributes, carry their own bodies as accessories and are not shy at showcasing them in public. The spornosexual style emphasises heavy, lean musculature, and certain kinds of tattooing. Spornosexuals spend much money and time on physical fitness and upkeep. Some commentators argue that the rise of spornosexuals is another indication of society becoming evermore narcissistic.

== Books ==
=== Male Impersonators ===
Simpson's first book Male Impersonators (1994) provided the background for his theory of metrosexuality by examining the way men were represented in popular culture – movies, ads, mags, music, male stripping, and comedy – and showing how 'unmanly' passions such as homoeroticism, male narcissism, and male masochism were not excluded but rather exploited, albeit semi-secretly, in voyeuristic virility.

Returning to Freud's theory of universal bisexual responsiveness, Simpson also 'outed' what he saw as the homoerotic subtext of masculinity itself. In particular, Simpson analysed the way movies, ads, pop music, and bodybuilding, had replaced 'real' masculinity, if it ever existed, with something 'sexy and simulated'. In his chapter on Marky Mark and his (then) recent Calvin Klein ads, Simpson argued that the rapper's appearance on billboards in Times Square and on the side of buses 'in his prime and in his underwear', grabbing his 'package' to shift product, graphically demonstrated how the commodification of the male body – 'and gay men's love for it' – had become 'eyepoppingly' mainstream.

The book included a chapter arguing that the real romance in Top Gun was between Maverick (Tom Cruise) and Iceman (Val Kilmer). Quentin Tarantino made a cameo appearance in the film Sleep with Me later the same year as a party-guest making a similar argument.

=== Anti-Gay ===
Simpson's collection Anti-Gay (1996), described on the jacket as "the shameful antidote to feelgood politics"', according to The Independent, "divided the gay community". Led by Simpson, various 'non-heterosexual' contributors, such as Bruce LaBruce and Glenn Belverio, John Weir, Peter Tatchell, Lisa Power, and Anne-Marie Le Ble, voiced their criticism of the gay "one-size-fits-all" identity and the gay media's intolerance of anything that wasn't "glad" and "clap happy". Anti-Gay was one of the first "post-gay" books, appearing a year or so before a series of largely conservative American gay books critical of gay culture, such as The Rise and Fall of Gay Culture (D Harris, 1997) and Life Outside (M Signorile, 1997), Sexual Ecology (G Rotello, 1998).

=== It's a Queer World ===
It's a Queer World published the same year, described on the dust jacket as "hilariously perverse" and "taking a warped look at fin-de-siecle pop culture where nothing is as straight – or gay – as it seems", collected Simpson's popular columns of the same name which appeared in Attitude magazine, and showed how gay and straight culture were converging, a decade before this became a common theme.

=== The Queen is Dead ===
The Queen is Dead (1998) collected his colourful and confessional correspondence with American writer Steven Zeeland. According to the jacket blurb: "A chance letter sparks off an hilariously doomed transatlantic literary romance involving Marines, glory holes, cats, intellectuals, transsexuals and a bizarre love-triangle rivalry with gay serial-killer and Gianni Versace's assassin Andrew Cunanan." Despite its openly offbeat subject matter, it was reviewed positively: "Something of a masterpiece" wrote Roger Clarke in The Independent.

=== Sex Terror ===
Sex Terror: Misadventures in pop culture is a collection of essays, interviews and articles from Simpson's late 1990s journalism, including writings in Attitude magazine and The Guardian. Interview subjects include Henry Rollins, Julie Burchill and Dana International.

=== Saint Morrissey ===
Saint Morrissey was Simpson's "psycho-bio" of the former Smiths front man, written at a low point of the singer's career, and published the year before Morrissey's 2004 comeback. The book prompted some comparisons with the subject's style: "Simpson is funny, clever, honest, irreverent and egotistical: quite the match for Morrissey. More biographies should be written this way." (Laurence Phelan, Independent on Sunday Books of the Year')

=== Metrosexy ===
Simpson's ebook, Metrosexy (2011), collects his writings on the subject of metrosexuality, offering a kind of biography of the subject, which he describes as a "Frankenstein monster with flawless skin". The book follows the term from its origin in an article of Simpson's for The Independent newspaper in 1994, to its international adoption in the early 2000s, the backlash against it and its subsequent Jersey Shore resurgence, to the point where Simpson argues that metrosexuality had come to be seen as simply "normal".
