= Bishōnen =

Japanese term for an attractive young man

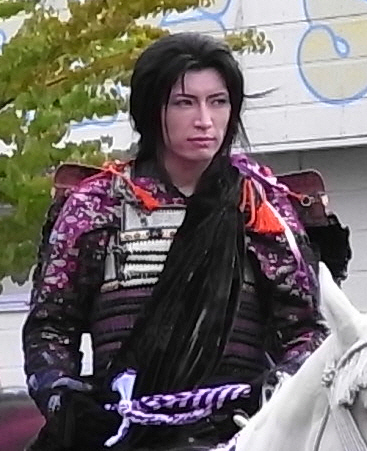
Gackt, a Japanese singer-songwriter, is considered to be one of the living manifestations of the bishōnen phenomenon.

Bishōnen (美少年; IPA: [biɕoꜜːneɴ]; also transliterated bishounen) is a Japanese term literally meaning "beautiful youth" and describes an aesthetic that can be found in disparate areas in East Asia: a young man of androgynous beauty. This word originated from the Tang dynasty poem Eight Immortals of the Wine Cup by Du Fu. It has always shown the strongest manifestation in Japanese pop culture, gaining in popularity due to the androgynous glam rock bands of the 1970s, but it has roots in ancient Japanese literature, the androsocial and androerotic ideals of the medieval Chinese imperial court and intellectuals, and Indian aesthetic concepts carried over from Hinduism, imported with Buddhism to China. Today, bishōnen are very popular among girls and women in Japan. Reasons for this social phenomenon may include the unique male and female social relationships found within the genre. Some have theorized that bishōnen provide a non-traditional outlet for gender relations. Moreover, it breaks down stereotypes surrounding feminine male characters. These are often depicted with very strong martial arts abilities, sports talent, high intelligence, dandy fashion, or comedic flair, traits that are usually assigned to the hero/protagonist role.

== Origin ==
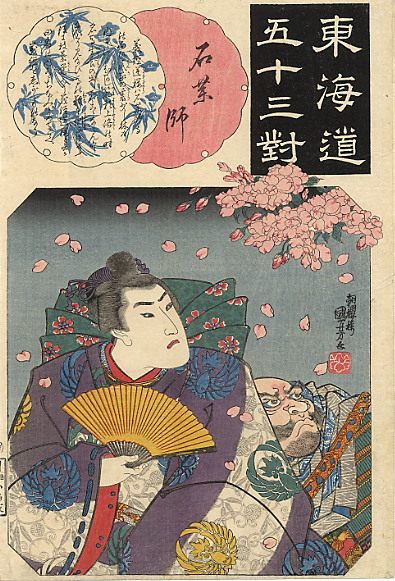
Yoshitsune, the most famous historical bishōnen, and his retainer Benkei view the falling cherry blossoms.

The prefix bi (美) more often than not refers to feminine beauty, and bijin, literally "beautiful person", is usually, though not always, used to refer to beautiful women. Bichūnen (美中年) means "beautiful middle-aged man". Biseinen is to be distinguished from bishōnen as seinen (青年) is used to describe men who are of age, including those who have entered or completed tertiary education. The term shōnen is used to describe boys of middle and high school age. Last, bishota can be used to refer to a beautiful, pre-pubescent male child or a childlike male. Outside Japan, bishōnen is the most well-known of the three terms, and has become a generic term for all beautiful boys and young men.

The aesthetic of the bishōnen began as an ideal of a young lover, originally embodied in the wakashū (若衆; literally "young person", although only used for boys), or adolescent boy, and was influenced by the effeminate male actors who played female characters in kabuki theater. The term arose in the Meiji era, in part to replace the by then obsolete erotic meaning of the older term wakashū, whose general meaning of "adolescent boy" had by this point been supplanted by the new term shōnen. The bishōnen was conceived of as "aesthetically different from both women and men [...] both the antithesis and the antecedent of adult masculinity".

The bishōnen typically has the same traits as idealized female beauties in Japan: lustrous black hair, opaque skin, red cheeks, etc., but simultaneously retains a male body, making them aesthetically different from either men or women. Western audiences may perceive the bishōnen as the feminized masculine, but the Japanese perception is more that the bishōnen embodies both the male and female.

Minamoto no Yoshitsune and Amakusa Shirō have been identified as historical bishōnen. Ian Buruma notes that Yoshitsune was considered by contemporaries to be not physically prepossessing, but that his legend later grew and due to this, he became depicted with good looks. Abe no Seimei was depicted according to the standards of a Heian-era middle-aged man, but since 1989 he has been depicted as a modern-style bishōnen.

Kyokutei Bakin wrote many works with nanshoku undertones featuring bishōnen characters, and in 1848 he used the term bishōnen in the title of a work about the younger wakashu partner in the nanshoku relationship.

The bishōnen aesthetic is continued today in anime and manga, especially shōjo and yaoi.

== Usage ==
Some non-Japanese, especially American, anime and manga fans use the term to refer to any handsome male character regardless of age, or any homosexual character. In the original Japanese, however, bishōnen applies only to boys under 18. For those older, the word bidanshi (美男子; literally "handsome man") is used. In the place of bishōnen, some fans prefer to use the slightly more sexually neutral bijin (美人) or the Anglicized slang term "bishie" (also spelled "bishi"), but these terms remain less common. The term binanshi was popular in the 1980s. Bishōnen is occasionally used to describe some androgynous female characters, such as Takarazuka actors, Lady Oscar in The Rose of Versailles, or any women with traits stereotypical to bishōnen. The term bifauxnen is also sometimes used in those cases.

Scottish pop singer Momus notably used the term in his song "Bishonen" from the Tender Pervert album (released on Creation Records). Almost 8 minutes long, the song is an epic tale of a young boy raised to die young by an eccentric stepfather.

== Popular culture ==
According to Pflugfelder, the bishōnen concept can be related to the "smoothie/roughneck" dichotomy of the Edo period. Sophisticated Japanese young men (smoothies) competed for hierarchical sexual dominance with so-called "roughneck" (juvenile delinquent) men, with occasional reports of violence between the two groups. By the 1920s the "smoothie" men had won out over the roughnecks in the popular imagination; "rough was no match for smooth", writes Pflugfelder.

In particular, Japan's largest male talent agency, Johnny & Associates Entertainment Company, specializes only in producing male Tarento idols. Accepted into Johnny & Associates in their early teens, these boys, collectively known as 'Johnnys', are trained and promoted to become the next leading singing-acting-commercially successful hit sensations. Almost all can be classified as bishōnen, exhibiting the same physically feminine features combined with a sometimes deliberately ambivalent sexuality or at the very least, a lack of any hint of a relationship to maintain their popular availability. Many of the bishōnen stars hired by Johnny & Associates eventually abandoned their princely image, and became stock characters in variety shows and other normal day-to-day programming.

== Art ==
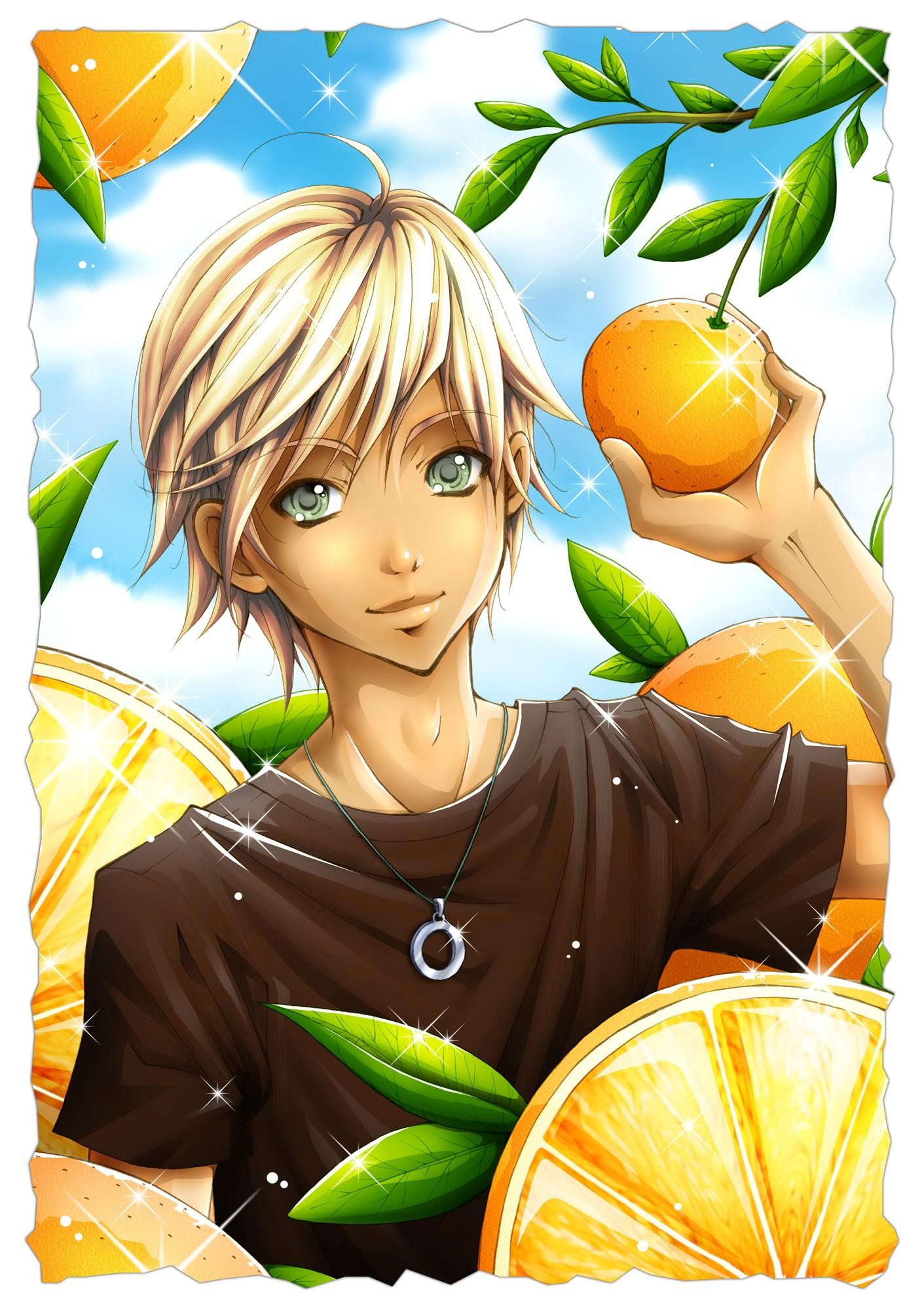
An example of a manga style bishōnen.

Besides being a character type, bishōnen is also a distinct art style not usually forgotten in books about drawing manga. In art, bishōnen are usually drawn delicately, with long limbs, silky or flowing hair, and slender eyes with long eyelashes that can sometimes extend beyond the face. The character's "sex appeal" is highlighted through introducing the character by using an "eroticized" full-page spread. Characters with "bulging muscles" are rarely considered bishōnen, as they are too masculine.

Bishōnen characters are fairly common in shōjo manga and anime. Many of the male characters show subtle signs of the bishōnen style, such as slender eyes or a feminine face.

Some manga are completely drawn in the bishōnen style, such as Saint Seiya. bishōnen manga are generally shōjo manga (girls' comics) or yaoi (girls' comics focused on homosexual relationships between beautiful boys), however shōnen manga (boy's comics) may use casts of bishōnen characters for crossover appeal to female readers. Mainstream shounen and seinen fare also often uses such characters as rivals for a traditional masculine protagonist, with some degree of comic relief, or for the blander everyman, whether as the embodiment of his insecurities in a grittier realism, or as a more lighthearted constant reminder of his less than advantageous social status and the constraints thereof. Comics for younger boys tend to use arrogant bishōnen in the role of the recurring minor rivals readers love to hate, though their effeminate good looks there will often appear older, bigger, stronger, and thus in fact more masculine than the commonly shorter and less mature protagonists.

== Bishōnen and bishōjo ==
Bishōjo ('beautiful girl') is often mistakenly considered a parallel of bishōnen, because of the similar construction of the terms. There are major differences between the two aesthetics. The bishōjo aesthetic is aimed at a male audience, and is typically centered on young girls, drawn in a cute, pretty style; bishōnen is aimed at a female audience, centered on teenage boys, and drawn elegantly. Another common mistake is assuming that the female characters in bishōnen manga and anime are bishōjo. In truth, female characters in bishōnen manga are very different from those in bishōjo; bishōjo females are usually more petite and drawn in a style that is cute rather than beautiful, whereas bishōnen females exhibit the long limbs and elegance of the bishōnen themselves.

== Critical attention ==
Several cultural anthropologists and authors have raised the multifaceted aspect of what bishōnen represents and what it is interpreted as, mostly to fit a particular external viewpoint. Ian Buruma noted that although Western comics for girls also included "impossibly beautiful men" who are clearly masculine and always get the girl in the end, the bishōnen are "more ambivalent" and sometimes get each other.

For Sandra Buckley, bishōnen narratives champion "the imagined potentialities of alternative [gender] differentiations" James Welker describes the bishōnen as being "queer", as the bishōnen is an androgynous aesthete with a feminine soul "who lives and loves outside of the heteropatriarchal world".

Jonathan D. Mackintosh believes that the bishōnen is a "traditional representation of youth", being "interstitial" between both childhood and adulthood and between being male and being female, regardless of the sexual issues.

Ishida Hitoshi makes the case that the image of the bishōnen is more about a grounding in sexuality than a transcendence of it, drawing on the idea of the image as being a refuge for alternative methods of looking at sexual natures, and sexual realities, at least since the 1960s, rather than the elegiac aesthetics of usages in an earlier era.

Representations of men in manga by and for men show "an idealized man being ultramasculine and phallic", bishōnen are conversely drawn to "emphasize their beauty and sensuality", and female artists have been said to react against the ultramasculine representation by showing androgynous and "aesthetically beautiful" men.

Ian Buruma, writing in 1984, considered the "bishonen in distress" to be a recurring motif in popular manga. The bishōnen in distress is always rescued by an older, protective, mentor. This scenario has an "unmistakably homoerotic" atmosphere. He also notes that bishōnen must either grow up, or die beautifully. He considers the "worship" of the bishōnen to be the same as that of the sakura, and notes that "death is the only pure and thus fitting end to the perfection of youth."

== See also ==
- Bijin
- Bishōjo
- Dandy
- Ephebos
- Himbo
- Ikemen
- Kkonminam
- Metrosexual
- Shōnen
- Yaoi
