= List of pidgins, creoles, mixed languages and cants based on Indo-European languages =

This is a list of pidgins, creoles, mixed languages and cants that are based or partially based on Indo-European languages.

== Pidgins ==
=== Germanic–Slavic ===
==== English–Russian-based ====
- Solombala English, from Solombala Shipyard, Arkhangelsk, Russia
- Runglish, from L2 English-speakers in post-Soviet states

==== Norwegian–Russian-based ====
- Russenorsk, from Northern Norway

=== Germanic ===
==== English-based ====
- West African Pidgin English, from the Guinea Coast
  - Kru Pidgin English
  - Liberian Interior Pidgin English
  - Nigerian Pidgin
  - Cameroonian Pidgin English
  - Ghanaian Pidgin
- Asia
  - South Asia
    - Butler English (India)
  - Southeast Asia
    - Thai Pidgin English
  - East Asia
    - Chinese Pidgin English (in Nauru)
    - Japanese Bamboo English
    - Japanese Pidgin English
    - Korean Bamboo English
- Oceania
  - Australia
    - Aboriginal Pidgin English
    - Port Jackson Pidgin English (ancestral to Australian Kriol)
    - Northern Territory Pidgin English (ancestral to Australian Kriol)
    - Queensland Kanaka English
  - Pacific Islands
    - Micronesia
      - Micronesian Pidgin English
      - Nauru Chinese Pidgin English
    - Polinesia
      - Samoan Plantation Pidgin
      - Hawaiian Pidgin English
    - Melanesia
      - Papua New Guinea Pidgin
      - Tok Pisin
      - Papuan Pidgin English (distinct from Tok Pisin)
      - Solomon Islands Pijin
      - Vanuatu Bislama
- North America
  - Native American Pidgin English

==== German-based ====
- Southwest Africa
  - Namibian Black German

==== Swedish-based ====
- Borgarmålet

=== Indo-Aryan ===
==== Assamese-based ====
- Nefamese

==== Hindi-based ====
- Arunachali Hindi
- Bombay Hindi
- Haflong Hindi

=== Indo-Iranian ===
==== Persian-based ====
- Harushīya no Kuchi (A Persian-lexified pidgin recorded in 18th-century Nagasaki, Japan)

=== Italic (Romance) ===
==== General Romance-based ====
- Lingua Franca/Mediterranean Lingua Franca (Sabir, Petit Mauresque or Little Moorish) was spoken in the Mediterranean Basin from the 11th to the 19th century.

==== French-based ====
- Français Tirailleur, a pidgin language spoken in West Africa by soldiers in the French Colonial Army, approximately 1850–1960.
- Tây Bồi Pidgin French, pidgin language spoken in former French Colonies in Indochina, primarily Vietnam

==== Italian-based ====
- Italian Eritrean
- Simplified Italian of Ethiopia
- Simplified Italian of Libya
- Simplified Italian of Somalia

==== Italian-Portuguese based ====
- Italo-Paulista

==== Italian-Spanish based ====
- Cocoliche

==== Portuguese–Spanish-based ====
- Europe
  - Portuguese–Spanish
    - Portuñol/Portunhol

=== Italic (Romance)–Germanic-based ===
==== French–English-based ====
- Camfranglais in Cameroon (mixed Cameroonian French-English Pidgin)

=== Different language families-based Pidgins ===
==== Indo-European–Bantu ====
===== Afrikaans–Tswana-based =====
- Tsotsitaal, from Gauteng, South Africa

===== Tsotsitaal–Zulu =====
- Camtho, from Gauteng, South Africa

===== Zulu-English-Afrikaans =====
- Fanagalo, from Southern Africa

== Creoles ==
=== Germanic ===
==== Afrikaans-based creoles ====
- Tsotsitaal, from Gauteng, South Africa
- Oorlams Creole, from Oorlams in South Africa

==== Dutch-based creoles ====
- Negerhollands (extinct) (US Virgin Islands)
- Berbice Creole Dutch (extinct) (Berbice river region)
- Skepi Creole Dutch (extinct) (Essequibo River region)
- Mohawk Dutch (extinct)
- Negro Jersey Dutch ("Neger-Dauts" - "Negro Dutch")
- Javindo, from Java, Indonesia
- Petjo, from Indos in Indonesia, with an immigrant community in the Netherlands

==== English-based creoles ====
- Atlantic
  - Caribbean
    - Western Caribbean
      - Jamaican Patois (Jamaican Creole English)
        - Limonese Creole
        - Bocas del Toro Creole (Panamanian Creole English)
        - Jamaican Maroon Creole
      - Belizean Creole
      - Miskito Coast Creole (Nicaragua Creole English)
        - Rama Cay Creole
      - San Andrés–Providencia Creole (Raizal Creole English/Islander Creole English)
    - Eastern Caribbean
      - Northern
        - Bahamian–Turks and Caicos Creole English (Lucayan Archipelago)
          - Bahamian Creole
          - Turks and Caicos Creole English
        - Gullah language (Sea Islands Creole English)
          - Afro-Seminole Creole
      - Southern
        - Virgin Islands Creole (Netherlands Antilles Creole English)
          - Crucian: Spoken on Saint Croix.
          - Saint Martin Creole English: Spoken in Saba, Sint Eustatius, Saint Martin.
        - Antiguan and Barbudan Creole
          - Anguillan Creole
          - Barbudan Creole
          - Kokoy
          - Montserrat Creole
          - North Antiguan Creole
          - Saint Kitts Creole
          - South Antiguan Creole
        - Vincentian Creole
        - Grenadian Creole English
        - Tobagonian Creole
        - Trinidadian Creole
        - Bajan Creole (Barbadian Creole English)
        - Guyanese Creole
  - Africa
    - West Africa
      - Krio (Sierra Leone Creole English)
        - Equatorial Guinean Pidgin (Pichinglis, Fernando Po Creole English, Bioko Creole English) (now also a Creole language)
      - Liberian Kreyol
      - Ghanaian Pidgin (now also a Creole language)
      - Nigerian Pidgin (now also a Creole language)
      - Cameroonian Pidgin (now also a Creole language)
  - Suriname
    - Sranan Tongo (Surinamese Creole English)
    - Saramaccan (Saramacca–Upper Suriname regions)
    - Surinamese and French Guianese Maroons
      - Aluku
      - Ndyuka (Aukan, Eastern Maroon Creole), in Suriname
      - Paramaccan
      - Kwinti, in Suriname
      - Matawai
- Pacific
  - South East Asian
    - Singlish
  - Australia
    - Australian Kriol
    - Torres Strait Creole
  - Pacific Islands
    - Micronesia
      - Ngatikese Creole
    - Polynesia
      - Hawaiian Creole
      - Tongan Creole (in Tonga)
    - Melanesia
      - Tok Pisin (now also a Creole language) (in Papua New Guinea)
      - Fijian Creole (in Fiji)
      - Pijin (now also a Creole language) (in Solomon Islands)
      - Bislama (in Vanuatu)
- Shelta, from the Irish Traveller community in Ireland
  - American Irish-Traveller's Cant, from the Irish Traveller American community in the United States

==== German-based creole ====
- Pacific
  - Melanesia
    - Unserdeutsch (Rabaul Creole German)

=== Indo-Aryan ===
==== Assamese-based creole ====
- Nagamese creole

==== Bengali-based creole ====
- Andaman Creole Hindi, a creole of Bengali, Hindi and Tamil
- Bishnupriya Manipuri, a creole of Bengali and Manipuri

==== Hindi-based creole ====
- Andaman Creole Hindi

==== Romani-based creole ====
- Cyprus
  - Kurbet

=== Italic (Romance) ===
==== French-based creoles ====
- Americas
  - Varieties with progressive aspect marker ape
    - Haitian Creole (Kreyòl ayisyen, locally called Creole)
    - Louisiana Creole (Kréyol la Lwizyàn, locally called Kourí-Viní and Creole), the Louisiana French Creole language. (not confuse with Louisiana French or Cajun French)
  - Varieties with progressive aspect marker ka
    - Antillean Creole is a language spoken primarily in the francophone (and some of the anglophone) Lesser Antilles, such as Martinique, Guadeloupe, Îles des Saintes, Dominica, St. Lucia, Trinidad and Tobago and many other smaller islands.
      - Dominican Creole French
      - Grenadian Creole French
      - Saint Lucian Creole French
        - San Miguel Creole French (in Panama)
    - French Guianese Creole is a language spoken in French Guiana, and to a lesser degree in Suriname and Guyana.
    - Karipúna French Creole, spoken in Brazil, mostly in the state of Amapá. (not confuse with Karipuna or Palikúr a native Arawakan language of Amapá State)
      - Lanc-Patuá, spoken more widely in the state of Amapá, is a variety of the former, possibly the same language.
- Indian Ocean
  - Varieties with progressive aspect marker ape – subsumed under a common classification as Bourbonnais Creoles (Mascarene Creoles)
    - Mauritian Creole, spoken in Mauritius (locally Kreol)
      - Rodriguan creole, spoken on the island of Rodrigues
      - Agalega creole, spoken in Agaléga Islands
      - Chagossian creole, spoken by the former population of the Chagos Archipelago
    - Réunion Creole, spoken in Réunion
    - Seychellois Creole, spoken everywhere in the Seychelles and locally known as Kreol seselwa. It is the national language and shares official status with English and French.
- Pacific Ocean
  - Tayo Creole, spoken in New Caledonia

==== Spanish-based creoles ====
- Americas
  - Caribbean
    - Bozal Spanish (in Cuba) (possibly extinct)
    - Palenquero (in a region of Caribbean coast of Colombia)
- Asia
  - Mindanao, Philippines
    - Chavacano (Zamboangueño Creole Spanish)

==== Portuguese-based creoles ====
- Africa
  - Upper Guinea Creoles
    - Cape Verdean Creole: Vigorous use, Cape Verde Islands.
    - Guinea-Bissau Creole: Vigorous use. Lingua franca in Guinea-Bissau, also spoken in Casamance, Senegal. Growing number of speakers.
  - Gulf of Guinea creoles
    - Angolar: A heavy substrate of Kimbundu, spoken on São Tomé Island, São Tomé and Príncipe.
    - Annobonese Creole (Fa d'Ambu): Vigorous use. Spoken on Annobón island, Equatorial Guinea
    - Forro: Forro is becoming the language of social networks. Spoken on São Tomé Island, São Tomé and Príncipe.
    - Principense Creole: Almost extinct. Spoken on Príncipe island, São Tomé and Príncipe.
    - Tonga Portuguese (Português dos Tongas)
- Americas
  - Papiamento
- Asia
  - Indo-Portuguese creoles
    - Southern Indo-Portuguese
      - Sri Lankan Portuguese creole (almost extinct)
      - Malabar Coast Indo-Portuguese
        - Cochin Portuguese Creole (Vypin Creole) (in Kochi) (extinct)
          - Cannanore Portuguese Creole (in Kannur) (almost extinct)
      - Coromandel Coast Indo-Portuguese
        - Bengal Creole Portuguese (extinct)
    - Northern Indo-Portuguese (Norteiro)
      - Korlai Portuguese Creole (Kristi): spoken in Korlai, India.
      - Bombay Portuguese Creole (extinct)
      - Daman and Diu Portuguese Creole: spoken in Daman and Diu, India. (old decreolization)
  - East Asian
    - Macanese
      - Macanese: Spoken in Macau. (old decreolization)
  - Southeast Asian
    - Malayo-Portuguese
      - Kristang (Cristão) (Malaccan Creole Portuguese): spoken in Malacca, Malaysia and emigrant communities in Singapore and Perth, Western Australia
      - Mardijker Creole: by the Mardijker people of Batavia (Jakarta) = Papiá Tugu: in Kampung Tugu, Jakarta, Indonesia. (extinct)
      - Bidau Creole Portuguese (Timor Pidgin): in the Bidau area of Dili, East Timor. (it was also a creole) (extinct)
      - Portugis (Ternateño): in the Ambon, Ternate islands and Minahasa, Indonesia. (extinct)

== Mixed languages ==
=== Between Indo-European languages ===
- Balto-Slavic
  - Belarusian–Russian
    - Trasianka/Meshanka (Belarusian-Russian mixed speech)
  - Ukrainian–Russian
    - Surzhyk (Ukrainian-Russian mixed speech)
- Germanic
  - German–Danish
    - Petuh, Danish grammar and semantics with German vocabulary.
  - High German–Low German (Low Saxon)
    - Missingsch, Low Saxon grammar, pronunciation, pragmatics, loanwords and substrate and German vocabulary.
  - Swedish–Norwegian
    - Svorsk
- Indo-Aryan
  - Para-Romani (Romani Ethnolects based on Indo-European languages, mainly Romani lexic with other languages grammars and variable Romani grammar features also)
    - Romani–Other Indo-Iranian
      - Romani–Iranian
        - Romani–Persian
          - Afghanistan Gorbat
          - Persian Romani (mixed Romani-Persian)
          - Magati
    - Romani–Domari–Armenian
      - Lomavren (mixed Romani–Domari–Armenian)
    - Romani–Balto-Slavic
      - Romani–Slavic
        - Romano-Serbian (mixed Romani–Serbian)
        - Bohemian Romani (mixed Romani–Czech) (extinct)
    - Romani–Germanic
      - Romani–English
        - Angloromani (mixed Romani–English)
      - Scandoromani (mixed Romani–General Scandinavian)
        - Romani–Swedish
          - Traveller Swedish
        - Romani–Danish
          - Danish Rodi, Traveller Danish
        - Romani–Norwegian
          - Rodi language, Traveller Norwegian
    - Romani–Hellenic
      - Romano-Greek (mixed Romani-Greek)
    - Romani–Italic (Romance)
      - Romani–Occitan–Iberian Romance
        - Caló
          - Occitan caló (Occitan: caló occitan)
          - Catalan caló (Catalan: caló català)
          - Spanish caló (Spanish: caló español)
          - Portuguese caló (Portuguese: caló português)
- Italic (Romance)
  - Estremaduran–Castilian–Portuguese
    - Barranquenho (Barranquian)

=== Indo-European–Other language families ===
- Indo-European–Eskimo–Aleutian
  - Russian–Aleutian
    - Mednyj Aleut
- Indo-European–Japanese
  - English–Japanese
    - Bonin English, a mix of Japanese and English Creole[40]
- Indo-European–Pama–Nyungan
  - English–Warlpiri
    - Light Warlpiri
  - English–Gurindji
    - Gurindji Kriol
- Indo-European–Turkic
  - Greek–Turkish
    - Cappadocian Greek
- Indo-European–Semitic
  - Greek–Arabic
    - Cypriot Maronite Arabic
- Indo-European-Basque
  - Germanic-Romance-Basque
    - Basque–Icelandic pidgin
- Indo-European–Basque
  - Romani–Basque
    - Erromintxela
- Indo-European–Uralic
  - Romani–Estonian
    - Laiuse Romani†
- Indo-European–Vedda
  - Sinhalese–Vedda
    - Vedda
- Indo-European–Algic
  - French–Cree
    - Michif
- Indo-European–Quechuan
  - Spanish–Quechua
    - Media Lengua

== Cant languages (Cryptolects, Secret languages) ==
=== Balto-Slavic ===
==== Bulgarian-based ====
- Meshterski, from Bulgaria

==== Polish-based ====
- Grypsera, from Poland

==== Russian-based ====
- Fenya from Russia
- Padonkaffsky jargon (or Olbanian) from Runet, Russia

==== Serbo-Croatian-based ====
- Banjački, from Serbia
- Šatrovački, from the former Yugoslavia

=== Celtic ===
==== Irish Gaelic-based ====
- Shelta, from the Irish Traveller community in Ireland

==== Scottish Gaelic-based ====
- Beurla Reagaird, a Gaelic-based cant used by Highland Traveller community in Scotland

=== Germanic ===
==== Danish-based ====
- Rotvælsk, from Denmark

==== Dutch-based ====
- Bargoens, from the Netherlands

==== German-based ====
- Rotwelsch, from Germany
  - Manisch, from Giessen, Germany

==== English-based ====
- Back slang, from London, United Kingdom
- Cockney Rhyming Slang, from London, United Kingdom
- Engsh, from Kenya
- Jejemon from the Philippines
- Polari, a general term for a diverse but unrelated groups of dialects used by actors, circus and fairground showmen, gay subculture, criminal underworld (criminals, prostitutes).
- Sheng from Kenya
- Swardspeak (or Bekimon, or Bekinese), from the Philippines
- Thieves' cant (or peddler's French, or St Giles' Greek), from the United Kingdom
- Tutnese, from the United States

==== Scots-based ====
- Scottish Cant a variant of Scots and Romani used by the Lowland Gypsies in Scotland, United Kingdom

==== Yiddish-based ====
- Klezmer-loshn, from Eastern Europe

=== Hellenic ===
==== Greek-based ====
- Podaná, from Greece

=== Indo-Aryan ===
==== Urdu-based ====
- Hijra Farsi, (Urdu and not Farsi-based) from South Asia, used by the hijra and kothi subcultures (traditional indigenous approximate analogues to LGBT subcultures)

=== Indo-Iranian ===
- Äynu, from Xinjiang, China

==== Persian-based ====
- Adurgari, from Afghanistan

=== Italic (Romance) ===
==== French-based ====
- Javanais, from France
- Louchébem, from France
- Verlan, from France

==== Galician-based ====
- Barallete, from Galicia, Spain
- Fala dos arxinas, from Galicia, Spain

==== Italian-based ====
- Riocontra, from Lambrate, Milan, Italy

==== Lombard-based ====
- Spasell, from Italy

==== Portuguese-based ====
- Cafundó, from Cafundó, São Paulo State, Brazil
- Pajubá, a cryptolect spoken by practitioners of various Afro-Brazilian religions and the Brazilian LGBTQ community, with sources from various west and southwest African languages
- Minderico, from Minde, Santarém District, Portugal
- Miguxês, from the emo, hipster subcultures of young netizens in Brazil

==== Sicilian-based ====
- Baccagghju, from Calabria, Italy

==== Spanish-based ====
- Bron, from León and Asturias, Spain
- Caló/Pachuco, from the Southwestern United States
- Gacería, from Spain
- Germanía, from Spain
- Lunfardo, from Argentina and Uruguay
- Xíriga, from Asturias, Spain

== See also ==
- List of Indo-European languages
