= Japanese-based creole languages =

Family of languages were Japanese serves as lexifier

Japanese-based creole languages or simply Japanese Creoles are creole languages for which Japanese is the lexifier. This article also contains information on Japanese pidgin languages, contact languages that lack native speakers.

== List of languages ==
Some important Japanese creoles and pidgins are the following:

Creole	Location	Status
Yilan Creole	Taiwan	endangered
Kyowa-go	China	extinct
Yokohama Pidgin Japanese	Japan	extinct
Ogasawara Creole	Ogasawara Islands	extinct
Japanese Bamboo English	Japan	critically endangered

Japanese has also made a significant contribution to other pidgins and creoles: to Ogasawara Creole, with an English-based lexicon, spoken in Ogasawara Islands, to the Chinese-based Xieheyu spoken in Manchukuo, to the Bamboo English of occupied Japan, and to the Hawaiian Pidgin which became a creole spoken in Hawaii.

== See also ==
- Dutch-based creole languages
- Spanish-based creole languages
- English-based creole languages
