= List of idioms considered racist =

The English idioms listed below are generally or sometimes considered to be racist. Some idioms express negative ethnic stereotypes, some invoke white supremacy, some trivialize painful historical memories, and others have innocent origins but may be interpreted as racist. While racism in idioms is sometimes explicit, some may be covertly racist.

== Idioms ==
- Call a spade a spade, meaning to speak frankly. The idiom originates from classical Greek and has been used in English since the mid-16th century. It is sometimes considered racist in modern contexts, after "spade" emerged as a racial slur (meaning an African American person) in the 1920s.
- Chinaman's chance, used in the United States, meaning little or no chance of success. The idiom carries pejorative connotations, alluding to the low probability of success resulting from "the endless social barriers that were thrown up against Chinese immigrants seeking opportunities to advance".
- Circle the wagons, used in the United States, meaning to unite a group for a common purpose. Some Indigenous people view the term as offensive based on its literal meaning stemming from the manifest destiny era when many tribes were driven off of their land by settlers arriving by wagon. Some critique the term on the basis that it is culturally insensitive and evokes racist images of Native Americans.
- Grandfathered in, used in the United States, meaning that exempts some from a new rule or policy because they established their activity or status before the rule changed. It is derived from the so-called "grandfather clauses" that were put into law after the U.S. Civil War which, in practice, exempted poor, uneducated white citizens from hard literacy tests that were required for Black Americans in order to vote.
- Gypped (also spelled Jipped), used in the United States and Canada, meaning to be swindled or "ripped off". It derives from the exonym "Gypsy" for Romani people, and the stereotype that the Romani are deceitful and thieves.
- Indian giver, used in the United States to mean one who gives a gift and then takes it back, or expects something of equal value in return. The idiom is frequently used by children to describe someone who pretends to give a gift and takes it back.
- Long time no see, a greeting in the United States, is an imitation of Native American Pidgin English (or perhaps Chinese Pidgin English) meant to imitate and mock its speakers.
- Mighty white of you, and variations thereof, used in the United States, meaning "thank you for being fair." For example, a character in Erle Stanley Gardner's 1937 mystery novel, The Case of the Dangerous Dowager, says: "It was damn white of him." Since the 1970s, it is almost only used ironically.
- Off the reservation, used in the United States to mean acting outside of accepted boundaries. It refers to policing Native American people who were restricted to living on Indian reservations, and could only travel "off the reservation" with permission from a government agent.
- Peanut gallery, used in the United States, originally referred to the cheapest seats in a theater during the days of vaudeville, later a nickname for the upper balcony seats where Black Americans were forced to sit.
- Play the white man, used in parts of Great Britain, meaning that someone is attempting to be decent and trustworthy in their actions. The phrase implies that white people are inherently more honorable than people of other races.
- The pot calling the kettle black, meaning to accuse hypocritically, has been used in racist contexts (e.g., in reports from the Boer War), and is sometimes avoided because of the concerns that it covertly conveys "negative ideas about individuals and groups" (i.e., blackness). Folklorist Patricia Turner says that the idiom is widely used by both Black and non-Black Americans, and that Black Americans are less likely to assign racist connotations to the phrase.
- Sold down the river, used in the United States, meaning that one was betrayed. It originated as a lament of eastern slaves being split apart from their families and forcibly transported to plantations in the Deep South, where conditions were even worse. Users of the idiom may seem to be trivializing or minimizing the suffering of the enslaved people it evokes.
- Speak white!, an imperative idiom used in Canada, ordering someone (typically a Francophone) to speak in English. The phrase is an example of linguistic imperialism.

== See also ==
- List of ethnic slurs
- Microaggression
- Raciolinguistics
