= Australian Aboriginal Pidgin English =

Australian Aboriginal Pidgin English is any of a number of English contact pidgins spoken or once spoken in Australia:

- Port Jackson Pidgin English (New South Wales)
- Queensland Kanaka English
- South Australian Pidgin English
