= South Australian Pidgin English =

English-based pidgin contact language

- SAPE
- Region: South Australia, Kangaroo Island, later further north
- Ethnicity: Aboriginal Australians, Australians
- Era: 1820s to 1920s
- Language family: English-based pidgin: Pacific; South Australian Pidgin English

Language codes
- ISO 639-3: None (mis)
- Glottolog: sout3227

South Australian Pidgin English is an English-based pidgin contact language used between European settlers and Australian aboriginals. It began some time around or before 1820 on Kangaroo Island, a sealing and whaling base, between the sealers and whalers and their aboriginal wives while being influenced by Nautical Jargon and Port Jackson Pidgin English (PJPE). The center of the language shifted to Adelaide when South Australia was established in 1836, and was the contact medium between the colonists and the Kaurna people. The earliest written records of the language date from this period while the influence of PJPE continued and SAPE spread north. Northern languages influence the language during the 1860s but it retained its PJPE core. It seems to have stabilized by the 1890s and subsequently merged into English but traces of it remain in various English dialects.

Its phonology is mostly similar to standard English but it contains some differences.

== History ==
South Australian Pidgin English developed around 1820 from the population of Kangaroo Island. At this time Kangaroo Island was a major whaling and sealing center populated by 50 European and Austronesian male whalers and sealers and roughly 100 Aboriginal wives who were mostly kidnapped from Tasmania, Port Lincoln, the Adelaide plains, and the mainland opposite Kangaroo Island. Given the extremely multilingual population of the island it is likely that some sort of pidgin developed but knowing the exact linguistic situation is difficult due to lack of sources. But what can be said with confidence is that whatever pidgin developed was influenced by Nautical Jargon, Port Jackson Pidgin English, Indigenous Tasmanian and Pama-Nyungan languages.

As the inhabitants of Kangaroo Island began to establish contact with mainland Aboriginal peoples the pidgin likely began to spread to those peoples. Though at this early stage SAPE would have been highly unstable and could better be described as a series of commonalities between patterns of speech rather than a language in and of itself. SAPE at this time was mostly used for communication between Aboriginal Australians and colonists.

After South Australia became a state the settlers began to write down SAPE so a better picture of SAPE emerges. During this time the center of SAPE moved from Kangaroo Island to Adelaide and many recording of usage of SAPE between the native Kaurna people and the Europeans exist, and because the settlers almost never learned Kaurna the Kaurna and settlers used SAPE for their interactions. Though over time the native population crashed due to war and disease so the use of SAPE in Adelaide decreased significantly and it was restricted to more peripheral areas and its use in those areas spread particularly though cattlemen and other pastoralist settlers. Because many of the cattlemen also spoke PJPE during this time the influence of PJPE was particularly and most of the SAPE lexicon was derived from PJPE.

Going into the 1860s settler economic activity began to spread farther inland, making contact with many previously uncontacted tribes being introduced to settlers for the first time. This led to a lot of economic activity between the settlers and the natives which led to a spread of SAPE with most natives in areas with a lot of contact speaking at least some SAPE. As well as the entrance of many words from northern aboriginal languages into SAPE, though aside from these additions SAPE was mostly stable. Though the larger scale introduction of Standard English by missionaries as well as the decimation of native populations hurt the speaker total.

As English became more established in South Australia SAPE gradually decreolized into English, though it left influences on Cattle Station English and Australian Aboriginal English.

== Phonology ==
SAPE phonology was mostly the same as regular English but it contained some differences. Due to the fact that most Aboriginal languages don't have fricatives /f/ merged with /p/, /v/ merged with /b/, /θ/ becomes either /t/ or /d/, and /ʃ/ becomes /tʃ/; additionally some consonant clusters are reduced.

	English	SAPE
/f/->/p/	Fish	Pish/Pis
/f/->/p/	Flour	Plour
/v/->/b/	Very	Bery
/v/->/b/	Never	Neber
/θ/->/t/, /d/	Think	Tink
/θ/->/t/, /d/	This	Dis
/ʃ/->/tʃ/,	Sugar	Choogah

== Morphology ==
Due to the fact that SAPE was a pidgin language, its morphology was greatly simplified compared to both English and the Australian Aboriginal Languages, aspects of this simplification include the absence of: Copula, the definite article, the auxiliary verb "to do", verbal inflections, possessive inflections, plural inflections, conjunctions. Though the absence of these is not consistent and varied due to two things: People recording SAPE sometimes added these to make the text more understandable to non speakers and some Indigenous Australian who spoke SAPE and some English would mix the two creating an interlanguage.

=== Pronouns ===
			Nominative	Accusative	Reflexive
First-person	Singular		me		me
First-person	Plural		me and all about/we	us	you and me
Second-person	Singular		you		you
Second-person	Plural		you all about		you all about
Third-person	Singular	Masculine	him		him
Third-person	Singular	Feminine	him/she		him
Third-person	Singular	Neuter	him/he		him
Third-person	Plural		they		dem/them

== Lexicon ==
SAPE words can be divided into four groups based on their etymology: English words that have been spelled phonetically, words from PJPE, words from South Australian Aboriginal languages, and words from other Australian pidgins and Aboriginal languages.

Because of SAPE's limited lexicon many metaphors and paraphrases were frequently used were English used regular words. though the stability of these constructions varied, some like trousers belonging finger and whitefellow's emu appear to have only been used for a limited time and quickly given way to words more closely resembling standard English while others like yellow money appear to have more stable and wdespread.

Paraphrases and metaphors in SAPE
SAPE	English
trousers belonging finger	gloves
bone cocoanut	skull
yellow money	gold
whitefellow's emu	camel

SAPE's limited lexicon also meant that many things that were several words in English were merged into one word in SAPE with things that were usually one word in Australian languages but several words in English being some of the first words to undergo these mergers.

Lexical mergers in SAPE
SAPE	English
poonta	stone, hill, mountain
sit down	sit down, exist
