= Long time no see =

Greeting phrase in English

"Long time no see" is an English expression used as an informal greeting by people who have not seen each other for an extended period of time. The phrase is also acronymized as LTNS in Internet slang.

Its origins in American English appear to stem from pidgin English, and it is widely accepted as a fixed expression. The phrase is a multiword expression used within most varieties of Standard English. It may derive ultimately from an English pidgin such as that spoken by Native Americans or Chinese, or as an imitation of such.

== Etymology ==
Two primary etymological explanations exist. The expression might be derived from Native American Pidgin English, as close variations of the expression appear in at least two novels from 1900, both attributed to Native American characters. Alternatively, it might be a calque of the Mandarin Chinese phrase 好久不见 (pinyin: hǎojiǔbújiàn; simplified Chinese: 好久不见; traditional Chinese: 好久不見), lit. 'very long no see'. In Cantonese, the phrase 好耐冇見 (pronounced: hou2 noi6 mou5 gin3) has the same structure as in Mandarin.

== Origin in literature ==
The phrase was first recorded, though not as a greeting, in the 1843 publication by James Campbell, titled Excursions, Adventures, and Field-Sports in Ceylon: "Ma-am—long time no see wife—want go to Colombo see wife."

According to the Oxford English Dictionary, the phrase appeared in the Boston Sunday Globe in 1892, spoken by a woman who, in speaking to a man of Chinese descent, "from constant association had..fallen into the habit of talking pigeon English to the Chinamen", stating "Maybe. I think I go see my mamma to-day. Long time no see."

Interestingly, only two years later, in an 1894 piece once again in the Boston Daily Globe, the phrase was used in the context of a Native American speaker, in the phraseology of "Come to my tepee. Long time no see. Plenty game in mountains. We kill deer and bear."

Subsequently, as the phrase gained in popularity around the turn of the century, it was found in the 1900 Western entitled Thirty-One Years on the Plains and in the Mountains, Or, the Last Voice from the Plains An Authentic Record of a Life Time of Hunting, Trapping, Scouting and Indian Fighting in the Far West, by author W. F. Drannan, which recorded a Native American man greeting the narrator by saying, "Good morning. Long time no see you."
