= Northern Territory Pidgin English =

English-based pidgin spoken by Aboriginal Australians

North Territory Pidgin English
- Ethnicity: Aboriginal Australians, European Australians
- Language family: English-based pidgin: Pacific; Port Jackson Pidgin English; North Territory Pidgin English

Language codes
- ISO 639-3: –

Northern Territory Pidgin English was an English-based pidgin language spoken in Northern Australia by Aboriginal Australians.

== History ==
The predecessor to Northern Territory Pidgin English (NTPE) was another pidgin called Port Jackson Pidgin English (PJPE) was first attested in 1796 as being used by Aboriginal Australians and the British officials to communicate between each other in Port Jackson. PJPE would evolve into NTPE and by 1908 NTPE would creolize into Australian Kriol. After the creolization not all speakers would switch and many continued to speak NTPE and NTPE would transition into Later Northern Territory Pidgin English (LNTPE).

== Morphology and Syntax ==
Pronouns
	Singular	Dual	Plural
1st Person	me/I	we	we
2nd Person	you	you	you
3rd Person	him	all they/they	all they/they
