= Pinglish =

Pinglish may refer to:

== Hybrid forms of English and other languages ==
- Pakistani English
- Palestine English
- Papuan Pidgin English
- Fingilish or Pingilish, Persian English

== Other uses ==
- Pinglish, a village in Tral, Jammu and Kashmir, India

== See also ==
- Poglish or Ponglisch (German), Polish English
