= Yilan Creole =

Japanese creole of Yilan County, Taiwan

- Vernacular Atayalic Japanese
- Native to: Taiwan
- Region: Yilan County, Taiwan
- Native speakers: c. 3,000 (2010)
- Language family: Japanese-based creole
- Writing system: Latin

Language codes
- ISO 639-3: ycr
- Glottolog: yila1234
- ELP: Yilan Creole

Yilan Creole (Note: Japanese: 寒渓語, romanized: Kankei-go; Chinese: 寒溪語; pinyin: Hánxīyǔ) is a Japanese-based creole spoken in four villages in southern Yilan County, Taiwan. It arose in the 1930s and 1940s through contact between Japanese colonists and the indigenous Atayal people of the area. The vocabulary of a speaker born in 1974 was 70% Japanese and 30% Atayal, but the grammar of the creole does not closely resemble either of the source languages.

Yilan Creole is mutually unintelligible with both Japanese and Atayal. The creole was identified in 2006 by Chien Yuehchen and Sanada Shinji, but its existence is still largely unknown. It was named by Sanada and Chien for its location. Mandarin, the most commonly spoken language in Taiwan, threatens the existence of Yilan Creole.

== Classification ==
Yilan Creole is a creole language that is considered to be part of the Japonic language family. The superstratum and substratum languages of the creole are Japanese and Atayal, respectively. It is based on Japanese vocabulary and grammar, while simultaneously integrating the phonology, vocabulary, and grammar of the underlying Atayal or Sediq languages. It also absorbed some Hokkien and Mandarin vocabulary, ultimately crystallizing into a new language through linguistic fossilization. It has possibly been used as a first language among the Atayal and Seediq people since the 1930s.

== History ==
During Taiwan under Japanese rule period under the Shimonoseki Treaty of 1895 until 1945. Control over the island lasted about fifty years. During the latter period of this time, Imperial Japan enforced Taiwanese assimilation to Japanese language and culture. As a result of this contact between the Atayal and Japanese languages, Yilan Creole surfaced. Taiwanese people began attending schools taught in Japanese where all non-Japanese languages were banned, and by 1944 over 77% of Taiwanese were capable in speaking Japanese. Language reforms, name changes, and laws regarding social customs were among the reforms instilled by the Japanese Imperial government. Many are still competent in Japanese today where it is sometimes used as a lingua franca. Although China attempted to rid influence of Japan in Taiwan after the surrender of Japan in 1945, the impact on language and culture in Taiwan is still largely evident.

Yilan County, Taiwan

Atayal features surfaced in the Japanese language spoken in Taiwan, eventually becoming a pidgin before it fully developed into a creole, and the language is now currently the only known Japanese-based creole on the island, and possibly in the world.

== Contemporary usage ==
During the 2001 Indigenous Language Proficiency Test, Yilan Creole were excluded as non-indigenous languages. After vigorous advocacy by residents, they were finally recognized as "Hansi Atayal" and included in the proficiency test as a dialect of the Atayal language. During field interviews in 2009, residents self-identified their language as "Japanese".

== Geographic distribution ==
The creole is spoken in Yilan County in Eastern Taiwan, mainly in Tungyueh Village (東岳村) and Chinyang Village (金洋村), both of which are in Datong Township (大同鄉); and Aohua Village (澳花村), and Hanhsi Village (寒溪村), both of which are in Nan'ao Township (南澳鄉).

The varieties spoken in each village contain some minor differences. Although the exact number of Yilan Creole speakers is unknown, it is likely less than the total population of the four villages, which is 3,000. One estimate is that 2,000 to 3,000 speakers of Yilan Creole currently exist. While the creole is currently used among all generations, younger generations are receiving less exposure to it, causing the language to become endangered. While older speakers may not be fluent in Mandarin, younger generations are consistently using Mandarin more.

The Japanese language still has some influence in Taiwan society today. Websites in Japanese are regularly viewed by Taiwanese, with "few other countries [producing] as much information in Japanese as Taiwan". Evidence of Japanese signboards, particularly with the use of the Japanese hiragana character の (no) can often be seen in Taiwan. Taiwanese citizens who received Japanese education during the annexation of the nation still speak Japanese fluently today. There are three generations of Yilan Creole speakers, with the older and middle generations using the creole significantly more than the younger generation.

In Tungyueh Village, younger generations are generally not fluent in Yilan Creole, while there are still fluent younger generation speakers of the Creole in Aohua. After a push for preserving a more traditional and pure sense of Atayal heritage, Yilan Creole that is imbued with Japanese features was removed from language examinations. This further instilled a tendency toward Mandarin and a push away from Yilan Creole in young speakers. While older generations prefer to speak Japanese or Yilan Creole with people of the same age, they will often use Atayal or Mandarin mixed with Yilan Creole when speaking with younger generations; younger generations will similarly prefer Mandarin with same-age speakers, but may use Yilan Creole with older generations.

Due to the migration of Japanese from western Japan to Taiwan in the early half of the twentieth century, with seventy percent of Taiwan's immigrants being from western Japan (such as from Kyushu and Okinawa), Yilan Creole acquired some features of the dialects of western Japan. However, speakers are generally unaware that they are regional rather than standard Japanese features.

== Phonology ==
=== Consonants ===
Yilan Creole has the following nineteen consonants. The orthography is given in angle brackets where it differs from the IPA symbol.

		Labial	Alveolar	Palatal	Velar	Glottal
Nasal		m	n		ŋ ⟨ng⟩	
Plosive	voiceless	p	t		k	ʔ ⟨ʼ⟩
Plosive	voiced		d			
Affricate			ts ⟨c⟩			
Fricative	voiceless		s		x	h
Fricative	voiced	β ⟨b⟩	z		ɣ ⟨g⟩	
Approximant			l	j ⟨y⟩	w	
Trill			r			

Consonants in Yilan Creole are mostly identical to those of Atayal but it lacks the uvular plosive /q/. It acquired /d/ from Japanese, which is only found in loanwords.

=== Vowels ===
Yilan Creole vowels consist of /a i u e o/ which derive from both Japanese and Atayal, but also /ə/, which is inherited from Atayal. The rounding of /u/ in Yilan Creole is that of the protrusion of [u] in Atayal, as opposed to the compression of [ɯᵝ] in Standard Japanese.

	Front	Central	Back
Close	i		u
Mid	e	ə	o
Open		a	

Long consonants and vowels from Japanese words are often shortened in Yilan Creole, where gakkō 'school' in Japanese becomes gako 'school' in Yilan Creole.

=== Stress ===
Stress in Yilan Creole falls on the final syllable as it does in the Atayal language.

== Grammar ==
=== Morphology ===
Although Yilan Creole verbs are derived from Japanese and Atayal, verb conjugation patterns uniquely differ in some aspects. Tense is noted through the use of affixes and temporal adverbs together. Atayal-based verbs will still use Japanese affixation. Some processes of negation in Yilan Creole use Japanese derived forms to accommodate the realis mood that is part of Atayal grammar.

=== Syntax ===
The word order of Yilan Creole is subject–object–verb (SOV). It follows Japanese sentence structure, but there is evidence of Mandarin-based subject–verb–object (SVO) sentences as well, particularly among younger speakers.

== Vocabulary ==
In Yilan Creole, phonological forms of words are derived from Japanese, while the semantic properties are derived from Atayal. According to a study on Yilan Creole in Tungyueh Village by Zeitoun, Teng, and Wu, "the proportion of Atayal-derived words in the Yilan Creole basic vocabulary is 18.3%, and that of Japanese-derived words is 35.6%. Both Atayal-derived words and Japanese-derived words can be used for 33.8% of the items". Mandarin and Southern Min words also exist, but far less. Older generation speakers tend to use Atayal and Japanese variants more often than younger generational speakers, who prefer Mandarin variants, when they exist. Mandarin based words lose their tone in Yilan Creole.

Many Atayal words relating to nature, animals, and plants survived in the creole. Vocabulary of most concepts such as these related to traditional Atayal and Seediq life and culture are retained in Yilan Creole.

=== Suffixes ===
The verb suffix -suru in Yilan Creole, derived from the Japanese verb 'to do', is similar to its Japanese counterpart, except in that it is a bound morpheme, while the Japanese -suru can stand alone as an independent verb. Also, Yilan Creole –suru can attach to nouns, adjectives, and, among young generational speakers, verbs. However, older generation speakers do not accept verbs + -suru combinations.

Another affix in Yilan Creole is the Japanese derived -rasyeru for causative forms. However, while Japanese inflection differs between consonant versus vowel ending verbs, the Yilan Creole suffix does not.

=== Compound words ===
There are four types of compound words in Yilan Creole:

1. Type 1: Atayal-derived word + Atayal-derived word (e.g., hopa-la'i)
2. Type 2: Atayal-derived word + Japanese-derived word (e.g., hopa-tenki)
3. Type 3: Japanese-derived word + Atayal-derived word (e.g., naka-lukus, kako-balay)
4. Type 4: Japanese-derived word + Japanese-derived word (e.g., naka-pangcyu, unme-zyoto)

While Type 1 compound words occur in Atayal, Japanese does not have occurrences of Type 4 compound words in its own language, suggesting that Type 2, 3, and 4 compound words are creations of Yilan Creole.

=== Pronouns ===
A chart detailing Yilan Creole pronouns:

	Singular	Plural
1st person	wa/waha	watati/wahatati
2nd person	su/anta	Antatati
3rd person	hiya/zibun/zin/are	zintati/zibuntati/aretati

The forms of pronouns are Japanese derived. However, in comparison to both Atayal and Japanese, Yilan Creole has a simplified pronominal system. The creole distinguishes pronouns between person and number. Yilan does not distinguish between case, bound or free pronouns, nor inclusive versus exclusive pronouns as Atayal does. It also does not distinguish between gender and degree of politeness as Japanese does.

=== Demonstratives ===
Demonstratives in Yilan Creole are derived from Japanese.

=== Adjectives and adverbs ===
Adjectives and adverbs in Yilan Creole are derived from both Japanese and Atayal. Atayal adjectives are primarily used for colors and subjective feelings. Unlike Japanese, adjectives in the creole languages are not inflected and tense is expressed through temporal adverbs. Adjectives in Yilan Creole may also act as adverbs when modifying verbs. For example, the word lokah 'good, strong' "functions as an adjective when describing anta 'you' in the phrase lokah anta 'you (are) strong' ... while lokah functions as an adverb as in lokah benkyo 'to study hard'".

== Writing system ==
The Latin-based writing system of Yilan Creole uses the Atayal writing system used in Taiwan.

== Examples ==
The following are basic sentences in Yilan Creole demonstrating its basic vocabulary and grammar.

wasi la’i ni pila ager-u
1SG child DAT money give-NPST
I give money to the child.

are hocyo de niku kir-u
3SG {kitchen knife} INS meat cut-NPST
He/She cuts the meat with a knife.

ima wasi pila moca-nay
now 1SG money own-NEG
I don't own money now.

== Bibliography ==
- Chien, Yuehchen; Sanada, Shinji (2010a). "Yilan Creole in Taiwan". Journal of Pidgin and Creole Languages. 25 (2): 350–357. doi:10.1075/jpcl.25.2.11yue. ISSN 0920-9034.
- Chien, Yuehchen 簡月真; Sanada, Shinji 真田信治 (2010b). "Dōng Táiwān Tàiyǎzú de Yílán kèlǐàoěr" 東台灣泰雅族的宜蘭克里奧爾 [Yilan Creole of the Atayal People in Eastern Taiwan]. Táiwān yuánzhùmínzú yánjiū 台灣原住民族研究 (Abstract). 3 (3): 89. Archived from the original on April 1, 2018.
- Chien, Yuehchen (2015). "The Lexical System of Yilan Creole". In Zeitoun, Elizabeth; Teng, Stacy F.; Wu, Joy J. (eds.). New Advances in Formosan Linguistics (PDF). Canberra: Asia-Pacific Linguistics. pp. 513–532. hdl:1885/14354. ISBN 978-1-922185-17-4. Archived from the original (PDF) on 2018-04-01.
- Chien, Yuehchen; Sanada, Shinji (2011). "Negation in Taiwan's Yilan Creole: Focusing on -Nay and -Ng". Gengo kenkyū 言語研究 (140): 73–87. INIST 25353712. Archived from the original on 2023-02-06.
- Heinrich, Patrick; Ōhara, Yumiko (2019). Routledge handbook of Japanese sociolinguistics. Routledge handbooks. Abingdon, Oxon New York, NY: Routledge. ISBN 978-0-415-79027-7.
- Homma, N. (2013). "Vestiges of Japanese Colonialism in Taiwan" ( (PDF)). In Kyōto Gakuen Daigaku Ningen Bunka Gakkai 京都学園大学人間文化学会; Gakusei Ronbun-shū Henshū Iinkai 学生論文集編集委員会 (eds.). Ningen Bunka Gakubu Gakusei Ronbun-shū Dai 11-gō 人間文化学部学生論文集 第11号. Kyōto Gakuen Daigaku Ningen Bunka Gakubu. pp. 222–227. Archived from the original on December 25, 2019.
- Parker, J. D. (2012). Japanese Language Education in Colonized Taiwan: Language and Assimilation. Paper presented at the annual meeting of the 56th Annual Conference of the Comparative and International Education Society, Caribe Hilton, San Juan, Puerto Rico.
- Qiu, Peng (2015). A Preliminary Investigation of Yilan Creole in Taiwan: Discussing Predicate Position in Yilan Creole (PDF) (Master's thesis). University of Alberta. doi:10.7939/R3930P347.
- Sanada, Shinji 真田信治 (2015). "Giran Kureōru ni Okeru Sound Substitution ni Tsuite" 宜蘭クレオールにおけるsound substitutionについて [On the sound substitution of Yilan Creole] (PDF). Nara Daigaku Kiyō 奈良大学紀要 [Memoirs of Nara University] (43).
- "Formation Processes of Japanese Language Varieties and Creoles". National Institute for Japanese Language and Linguistics.
