= French Vietnamese =

French Vietnamese or Vietnamese French may refer to:

- Vietnamese people in France
- French people in Vietnam
- French language in Vietnam
- Tây Bồi Pidgin French, an extinct pidgin formerly spoken by non-French-educated Vietnamese
- Franco-Vietnamese relations
- Of or relating to Vietnam during the period of French Indochina
