= Français Tirailleur =

Extinct French-based pidgin of West Africa

Petit nègre
- Français tirailleur
- Petinègue, Forofifon naspa
- Region: West Africa
- Extinct: ca. 1850–1950
- Language family: French pidgin

Language codes
- ISO 639-3: None (mis)
- Glottolog: fran1267
- IETF: cpf-011
- French West Africa in 1913

Petit nègre (French pronunciation: [pəti nɛɡʁ]), also known as Français tirailleur (French pronunciation: [fʁɑ̃sɛ tiʁajœʁ]) or Petinègue or Forofifon naspa, is a pidgin language that was spoken by West African soldiers and their white officers in the French colonial army and across certain French colonies approximately from 1857 to 1954. It consists of a simplified form of French. It never creolized, and the "simplified" language was taught to indigenous inhabitants in the French colonial army in the French colonies.

== Background ==
The first West African soldiers were enrolled in the French colonial army in 1820, and the company of the Senegalese tirailleurs was formed in 1857. They fought for France in both World Wars. The last company of West African soldiers in the French Army was disbanded in 1964, and the last tirailleur who served in World War I died in 1998.

It is important to keep in mind that while slavery was abolished in France and its colonies in 1848, that does not mean the situation changed totally overnight. There is an interdepartmental report from 1950 suggesting that the recruitment was not necessarily voluntary from that point forward. The French military was to go "up-country to enroll captives, to whom the sum needed to purchase their freedom is given as enrollment bounty" (Hargreaves, 1969: 100 as cited in Wilson). In other words, the French more or less bought captives and turned them into soldiers.

The language of the West African soldiers in the French colonial army has been mentioned in descriptive works from the 19th century onward. The earliest documented utterances in Français Tirailleur are found in Dupratz (1864). Maurice Delafosse wrote about Français Tirailleur in 1904, describing it as a French equivalent of the better-known English pidgins in the area.

The most cited source on the language variety is an anonymous manual, Le français tel que le parlent nos tirailleurs Sénégalais. The manual was printed in 1916 and was intended to facilitate the communication between French officers and the African soldiers in the French Army.

The manual is prescriptive, instructing white officers on how best to formulate orders for optimal effect. The authors' comments suggest that the material is based on at least some actual experience with West African soldiers. There are also references to the structure of the Bambara language. That, together with the prescriptive nature of the work, suggests that the anonymous manual is the product of a conscious effort rather than natural utterances.

Chris Corne also wrote about this pidgin in his 1999 book on French contact languages.

== Potential substrates of tirailleurs ==
Many languages have been mentioned in connection with tirailleurs. First of all, there is a great consensus that the lexifier (the language that contributed the most lexical items) is French as spoken in the 1800s. The primary contact with French must have been through spoken discourse, which means that it is unlikely that structures and words that were then uncommon in the spoken language could have made it into the pidgin. A French officer named Charles Mangin in the late 19th century and the early 20th century published a book in 1910 called La Force Noire, in which he advocates using African troops in the event of a European war. This book also contains valuable information about the African troops and their composition. The following is a summary of the information available in Mangin's book.

Mangin writes that the first troops of African soldiers were mainly composed of the Wolof and Toucouleur people. Both the Wolofs and the Toucouleurs speak languages of the Senegambian branch of the Niger-Congo family and are predominantly Sunni Muslims. The Fula people are a large ethnic group in West Africa with a wide geographic spread and many different language varieties. Which variety of the Fula was spoken by these West African soldiers is not known. Biondi points out that one of the largest differences between the Slave Coast of West Africa and most parts of the French-colonised Americas was the presence and importance of the "mixed" population and signares in particular, with signare being a term used for African or part-African women who were companions to the European men of the colony.

Thus, the first troops were made up of speakers of Wolof and Fula. It is likely that there were soldiers, particularly Fula speakers, who had some knowledge of French prior to enrollment. After Wolof and Toucouleur, the Serer (also Northern Atlantic; Niger-Congo) were added to the troops. At the time of publication of La Force Noire, the most dominant group was the Mande peoples (Bambara, Mandinka, Dyula, Soninke and Susu), who were recruited after the Serer and speak Mande languages. The languages spoken by the Mande group are not related to the Niger-Congo. The Bambara and Mandinka were recruited first, and later Susu and Dyula, and lastly Soninke. The last group to be noted by Mangin as having been recruited by the French military was the Hausa of Dahomey (now northern Benin). The Wolof and Toucouleurs were preferred at the beginning, according to Mangin, because they were easier to integrate into the military, as indigenous officers already spoke their languages (Wolof and Fula). The Bambara proved more difficult to instruct at first, since they did not speak Wolof or Fula, but they later made up the largest group among the West African troops in the French colonial army.

The Hausa language is not related to Niger-Congo or Mande, but is a member of the Afroasiatic language family. There were, therefore, languages from at least three separate language families spoken among the soldiers: Niger-Congo, Mande, and Afro-Asiatic (if we go by the classifications as made by glottolog).

== In popular culture ==
Speakers of this pidgin have been depicted in the 1920 biographical work of Madame Lucie Cousturier and in Ousmane Sembène's 1987 film Camp de Thiaroye.

== Sample text ==
- Gradé ropéens y a compter nous comme sauvasi, comme plus mauvais chien encore

The European officers saw us as savages, even worse than dogs.

== See also ==
- French language
- French West Africa
- Tây Bồi Pidgin French
