= Kyowa-go =

Set of pidgin languages spoken in Manchukuo

Harmony language in Manchukuo

Chinese name
- Traditional Chinese: 協和語
- Simplified Chinese: 协和语
Transcriptions
Standard Mandarin
- Hanyu Pinyin: Xiéhé Yǔ

Japanese name
- Hiragana: きょうわご こうあご にちまんご だいとうあご
- Katakana: キョウワゴ コウアゴ ニチマンゴ ダイトウアゴ
- Kyūjitai: 協和語 興亞語 日滿語 大東亞語
- Shinjitai: 協和語 興亜語 日満語 大東亜語
Transcriptions
- Romanization: Kyōwa-go; Kōa-go; Nichiman-go; Daitōa-go

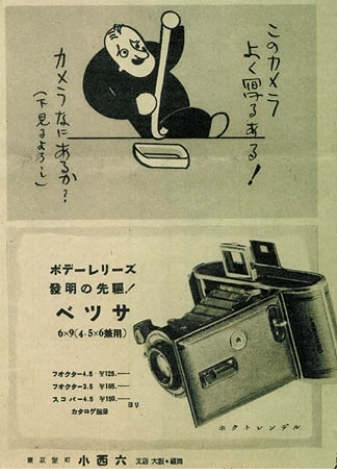
1937 newspaper advertisement featuring Kyōwa-go

Kyowa-go (協和語, Kyōwa-go; "Commonwealth language" or "Concordia language") or Xieheyu (Chinese: 協和語/协和语; lit. 'Harmony language') is either of two pidginized languages, one Japanese-based and one Mandarin-based, that were spoken in Manchukuo in the 1930s and 1940s. They are also known as Kōa-go (興亞語; "Asia development language"), Nichiman-go (日滿語; "Japanese-Manchukuo language"), and Daitōa-go (大東亞語; "Greater East Asia language").

== Description ==
The term Kyowa-go/Xieheyu is derived from the Manchukuo state motto "Concord of Nationalities" (民族協和 mínzú xiéhe) promoted by the Pan-Asian Movement. The pidgin language resulted from the need of Japanese officials and soldiers and the Han and Manchu population that spoke mainly Chinese to communicate with each other. Manchukuo officials later dubbed the pidgin language "Kyowa-go" or "Xieheyu", meaning "Concord language". However, the Japanese also wanted to implement their own language in Manchukuo, saying that Japanese is a language which has a soul, so the language must be spoken correctly.

Kyowa-go/Xieheyu died out when Manchukuo fell to the Soviet Red Army in the last days of World War II. Documentation of the pidgin language is rare today.

It was also believed that many of the expressions of Chinese characters in manga (e.g. aru) are derived from Japanese-based Kyowa-go. Hence, it is typical of Chinese characters in anime shows to speak in that manner.

It was also believed that many of the expressions of Japanese characters in movies set in the Second Sino-Japanese War (e.g. 悄悄地進村，打槍的不要) are derived from Mandarin-based Xieheyu. Hence, it is typical of Japanese characters in movies shows to speak in that manner.

The Japanese were also known to use pidgin languages in Japan itself during the 19th and 20th centuries like Yokohama Pidgin Japanese.

== Examples of Japanese-based Kyowa-go ==
Kyowa-go
- 協和語
- Region: Manchukuo
- Extinct: c. 1945
- Language family: Japanese-based pidgin

Language codes
- ISO 639-3: None (mis)
- Glottolog: None

Kyowa-go is characterized by a particle aru, omission of some particles, and many loan-words from Mandarin.

私 日本人 アル ヨ
Watashi nipponjin aru yo

Original Japanese: 私は日本人です Watashi wa nipponjin desu meaning "I am Japanese".

姑(クー)娘(ニャン) 綺麗 アル ネ
{Kūnyan (gūnyan)} kirei aru ne

Original Japanese: お孃さんは綺麗ですね Ojōsan wa kirei desu ne meaning "Isn't your daughter beautiful?"

貴方 座る の 椅子 ない アル ヨ
Anata suwaru no isu nai aru yo

Original Japanese: 貴方が座る椅子はありません Anata ga suwaru isu wa arimasen meaning "There is no chair for you"

アイヤー（哎呀）
Aiyaa!

Exclamation of surprise from Chinese.

== Examples of Mandarin-based Xieheyu ==
Xiehe-yu
- 協和語
- Region: Manchukuo
- Extinct: c. 1945
- Language family: Mandarin-based pidgin

Language codes
- ISO 639-3: None (mis)
- Glottolog: None

Xieheyu sometimes uses subject–object–verb, the normal Japanese word order, which is different from Mandarin.

你的 幫我， 我的 錢的 大大的 給。
nǐde bāngwǒ, wǒde qiánde dàdàde gěi.

你 幫我， 我 給你 很多 錢。
nǐ bāngwǒ, wǒ gěinǐ hěnduō qián.
If you help me, I'll give you a lot of money.

高橋 歐庫桑， 豬的 看見 沒有？ 那邊的 跑了的 有。
Gāoqiáo okusan, zhūde kànjiàn méiyǒu? nàbiānde pǎolede yǒu.

高橋 太太， 看見 那隻 豬 了 嗎？ 已經 跑到 那邊 去啦。
Gāoqiáo tàitai, kànjiàn nàzhī zhū le mā? yǐjīng pǎodaò nàbiān qùla.
Mrs. Takahashi, did you see that pig? It ran that way.

== See also ==
- Creole language
- Empire of Japan
- Pseudo-Chinese
