= Te Parau Tinito =

Tahitian pidgin of Chinese in Tahiti

- Native to: Tahiti
- Region: Papeete
- Native speakers: None elderly L2 speakers
- Language family: Tahitian pidgin

Language codes
- ISO 639-3: None (mis)
- Glottolog: tepa1234
- ELP: Te Parau Tinito; 2454

Te Parau Tinito (Tahitian for 'Chinese speech') is a moribund pidgin language spoken by ethnic Chinese in Tahiti, primarily in the capital Papeete. It is losing ground to Tahitian and French, and speakers are mostly elderly.
