= Pidgin Wolof =

Wolof-based pidgin of the Gambia

- Region: The Gambia
- Native speakers: None
- Language family: Wolof-based pidgin

Language codes
- ISO 639-3: None (mis)
- Glottolog: None

Pidgin Wolof is a pidgin language based on Wolof, spoken in the Gambia.
