= Samoan Plantation Pidgin =

English-based pidgin language of Samoa

- Native to: Kingdom of Samoa
- Region: Samoa
- Extinct: After 1975
- Language family: English-based pidgin: Pacific; Samoan Plantation Pidgin

Language codes
- ISO 639-3: None (mis)
- Glottolog: samo1307

Samoan Plantation Pidgin is an extinct English-based pidgin language that was spoken by black plantation workers in Samoa. It is closely related to Tok Pisin, due to the large number of New Guinean laborers in Samoa.

== History ==
=== Early history (1867–1879) ===
The early history of Samoan Plantation Pidgin (SPP) is poorly documented. The first surviving document with references to SPP is a newspaper article from 1889, though it references earlier texts from 1883. At this time the first plantation workers had already arrived from New Ireland and New Britain, and as the pidgin formed it formed its linguistic features came from two primary sources:

- Unstable and largely unattested jargonized versions of English spoken on Samoa.
- The large of number of Gilbert and Ellice Islanders employed on the islands' plantations in the 1870s.

=== 1879–1890 ===
This period saw a significant change in the recruitment of laborers for the Samoan plantations, with the Bismarck Archipelago and the North Solomons becoming the exclusive area of recruitment. The recruits from these areas mostly spoke the closely related languages of New Ireland, the Duke of York Islands, and the East New Britain Islands. This then led to a significant influence on SPP, gaining words such as taberan ('spirit') and matmat ('cemetery, grave'). During this time, as Europeans and natives traveled from Samoa to other islands as laborers, traders, missionaries etc., SPP spread to Mioko, Buka, Bougainville, New Ireland, and the Bismarck Archipelago. The pidgin was used in trading posts set up by Europeans across the various island chains, diplomatic communication between the Europeans and local chiefs, and during plantation work.

=== 1890–1914 ===
During this era SPP began to stagnate, as its speaking community did not expand and its social uses also did not change. While on the plantations there were now maay intertribal marriages and some children were even raised with SPP as their first language on the plantations, those who spoke SPP on Samoa would learn Samoan and stop speaking SPP, sometimes even forgetting it, and those outside of Samoa would assimilate into speaking another language. SPP failed to catch on in Samoa because outside of the plantation communities there wasn't a need for a lingua franca, as Samoan was spoken by the vast majority of the population and due to German support it was a prestigious language. The only people who learned SPP outside of these communities were "in villages adjoining the plantations of the white man or among Samoan women who consort with the [laborers]."

=== 1914–1975 ===
The end of German rule in Samoa also meant the end of the labor movement between New Guinea and Samoa; almost all laborers were repatriated, with only 172 "black-boys" staying in Samoa. SPP continued to have some use between whites, blacks, and Chinese workers on the plantations, but it mostly became an in-group language among those "black-boys" who had stayed in Samoa. The last church services in SPP where held in about 1965.

Some time after 1975, SPP went extinct.

== Grammar ==
Subject pronouns
	Singular	Plural
First	mi	mi ol
Second	yu	yu ol
Third	em, him, hi	em, him, ol

Object pronouns
	Singular	Plural
First	(bilong) mi	(bilong) as
Second	(bilong) yu	(bilong) yu ol
Third	(bilong) em	(bilong) dem

== Lexicon ==
The lexicon of SPP like all pidgins was very small compared to a full language, but unlike other pidgins like Australian Kriol and Tok Pisin, it is never expanded into a full creole. A study of several remembers in the 1970s found 300 basic lexical units. Most of these words were from English but some were from Samoan, Tok Pisin, or were of unknown origin.

== Sample text ==
Samoan Plantation Pidgin	English
Mi no gat masis Ol pikinini bilong ol blakboi i stap Mi wanpela mi stap Samoa blakboi i kam Samoa; Ol i spik dispela woataim i stap long Rabaul; Ol i go Nusilan	I have got no matches The children of the black labourers are alive I alone am left in Samoa the black labourers came to Samoa; They said, this war was in Rabaul; They went to New Zealand
