= Harushīya no Kuchi =

Persian-lexified pidgin recorded in 18th-century Nagasaki

Harushīya no Kuchi (HnK) is a Persian-lexified pidgin recorded in 18th-century Nagasaki by Gi Ryūzan, a tōtsūji (official interpreter). It served as a contact language between foreign traders and tōtsūji. The name is Japanese for "language of Harushīya". Gi used the terms harushīya no kuchi and harushīya kuchi in his glossary series yakushi chōtanwa, meaning "interpreters' phrases and words". Contemporary records associate the language with Persia and India.

The lexicon of HnK is primarily Persian, which in 1986 prompted a historian to declare that HnK "is, beyond any doubt, the Persian language" (magire mo naku perushia-go de aru). Examples include zan ("woman"), pīni ("nose"), kū ("mountain"), and dandon ("tooth"), which correspond to Persian zan, bini, kūh, and dandān, respectively. A smaller portion of the vocabulary derives from Hindustani, including muchirī ("fish") and raja ("lord"), corresponding to machhlī and rājā. A few words are of Portuguese origin.

Some HnK verbs exhibit vowel assimilation in the imperative prefix, a feature also found in contemporary colloquial Iranian Persian. Examples include bibin ("see!"), bokon ("do!"), and bohoru ("eat!"). Grammatically, HnK has relatively simple verb morphology, a topic marker, analytic numerals, and left-branching phrase structure.

Phrases and clauses recorded in yakushi chōtanwa include the following:

suma chan mefurushī suma afu(w)aru megui
you how.many you.sell you first you.say
‘How much do you sell that for? Say it first.’

man chī harushīya adomu/kyadan
I what harushīya person/leaders
‘I am a Harushīya/Mouru person.’
