= Borgarmålet =

Early 18th-century Swedish-based pidgin

- Sámi–Swedish pidgin
- Region: Swedish Sápmi
- Era: early 18th century
- Language family: Swedish-based pidgin

Language codes
- ISO 639-3: None (mis)
- Glottolog: borg1236
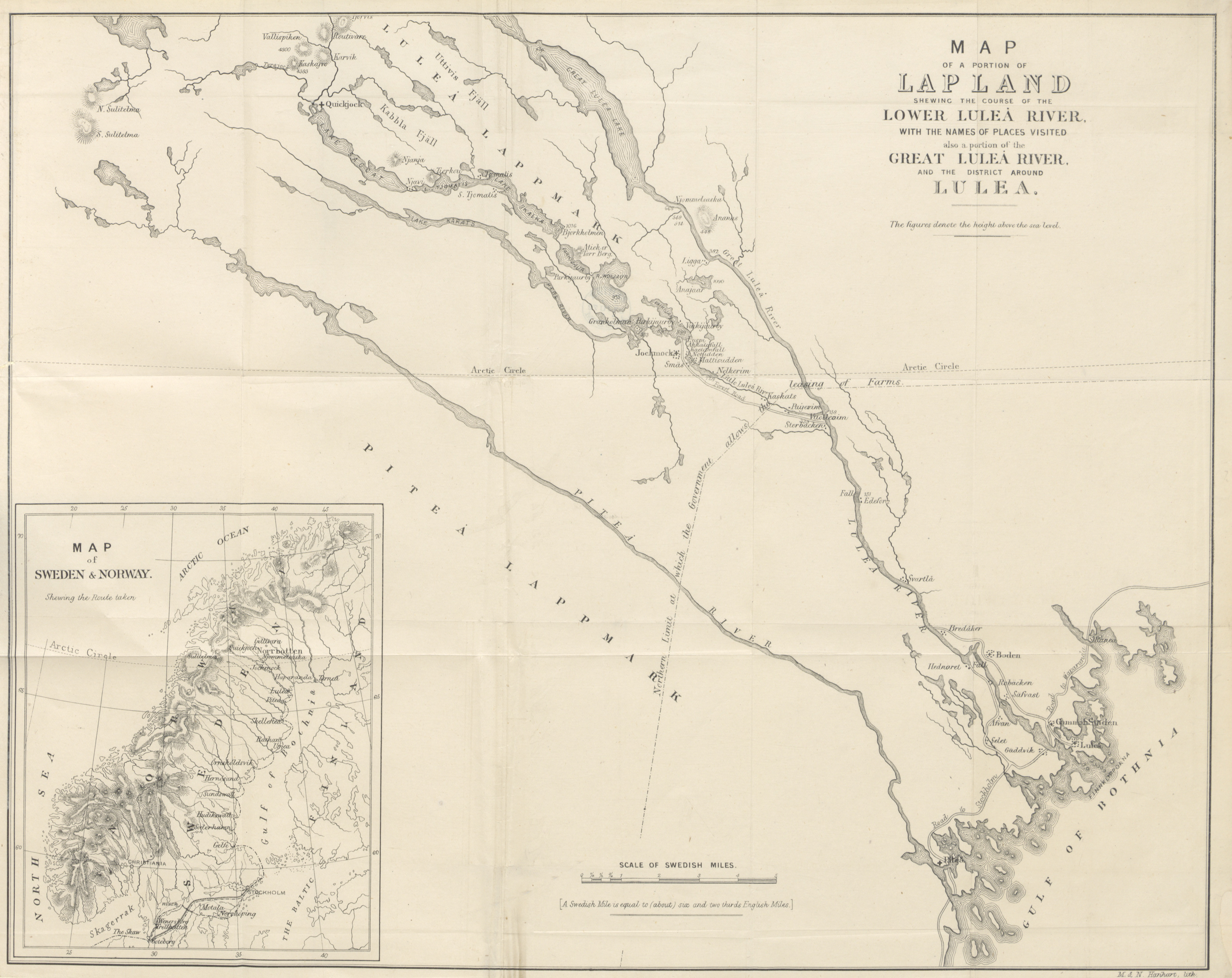
- The Lule River in a map from 1872.

Borgarmålet (lit. 'townsfolk language') was an early 18th-century Swedish-based pidgin in the Swedish portion of Sápmi (specifically, the Lule River region), used seasonally between the rural Sámi and Swedish-speaking merchants and other inhabitants of the towns. The vocabulary was largely Swedish, and the grammar was simplified, making it a predominantly analytic language.

From the limited data that has been preserved, it is not obvious to what extent Borgarmålet was a stable pidgin, as opposed to an ad hoc trade jargon. However, German Linguist Jurij Kuzmenko believes there is enough evidence to conclude that Borgarmålet was a typical pidgin with a stable grammar.

There was apparently some grammatical influence from local Sámi languages, such as conveying Sámi grammatical aspectual distinctions through the use of different Swedish words (that is, with lexical aspect). Specifically, several Borgarmålet verbs are recorded for 'to give', which seem to differ in the type of action. For example, 'you give me my skins and I'll give you your alcohol' uses three different verbs for 'give', stick, sätt, and kast. Stick (from Swedish sticka 'to prick') apparently indicated a momentary action; sätt (from Swedish sätta 'to set') an inchoative action (the onset of giving); and kast (from Swedish kasta 'to throw') a subitive action (to give suddenly). In addition, släpp (from Swedish släppa 'to release') appears to have been causative (to let give). These corresponded to grammatical distinctions required by Sámi languages, but not by Swedish.

Only about 13% of the words in Borgarmålet appear to come from Sámi languages.

== Examples ==
Five sentences were recorded by Pehr Högström, a Swedish linguist and missionary at Gällivare and Skellefteå, which he published in 1747:

Du stick uti mäg din skin, så ja sätt uti däg min bränwin. (Borgarmålet)
Du ger mig dina skinn, så ger jag dig brännvin igen. (Swedish)
"You give me your skins and I'll give you spirits in return." ("English")

Du släpp din räv uti min wåm, så få du din bak den pelsomesak.
Du ger denna rot eller rova åt min mage, så ger jag dig tillbaka detta muddskinn.
"You give me this root or turnip for my stomach and I'll give you [you'll get] back this reindeer skin."

Den lapman kast sin renost bak i den borgar.
Lappen ger renosten åt borgaren.
"The Sámi gives the reindeer cheese to the townsman."

Som du wara rätt stin.
Du är mycket dyr.
"You are very expensive."

Hur sit din heit?
Vad heter du?
"What's your name?"
