= Japanese Pidgin English =

English-based pidgin spoken or influenced by the Japanese

Japanese Pidgin English is any of several English-based pidgins spoken or influenced by the Japanese.

- Cape York Japanese Pidgin English, spoken in the pearling area at Thursday Island
- Hawaiian Pidgin English, which began as a pidgin jargon spoken by immigrant plantation workers in Hawaii
- Japanese Bamboo English, a pidgin jargon used on U.S. military bases after WW2 between some Japanese and U.S. occupation forces.

== Classification ==
The term Japanese Pidgin English occurred during the American Occupation of Japan; it is classified as a dialect of both English and Japanese. Despite the general opinion that pidgin is the dialect of the dominant language, neither of the languages shows a clear pattern of dominance.

== Background ==
The most commonly used Japanese Pidgin English (JPE), Bamboo-English and Yokohama Pidgin Japanese (YPJ) are extinct. One form of JPE that is still spoken nowadays is Hawaiian Japanese Pidgin English. YPJ was spoken in the second half of the 19th century in Yokohama, Kobe and Nagasaki. Bamboo English was spoken by U.S. army personnel and local Japanese after World War II and later transplanted to South Korea. JPE that exists in Hawaiian Pidgin was brought by immigrants who worked on plantations.

== Geographic distribution ==
Two major subtypes of Japanese Pidgin English are extinct. Hawaiian Pidgin English is the legacy of JPE; the main speakers of JPE will be Hawaiian Pidgin English speakers, which are local Hawaii residences. In the U.S. Census Bureau Report, Hawaiian Pidgin has 335 speakers. Another branch of JPE spoken is located in the state of Western Australia: Beagle Bay, Broome, Derby, La Grange, Lombardinie, One Arm Point, which has 40 second language speakers.

== See also ==
- Engrish
- Yokohama Pidgin Japanese, spoken in the Japanese port of Yokohama in the 19th century
