= Baccagghju =

Cant used in Southern Italy

Baccagghju, also known as baccaglio, is a cant based on Sicilian and Calabrian dialects used by members of Cosa Nostra and the 'Ndrangheta, the criminal organization operating in Calabria (Southern Italy). Sometimes the puppeteers of the Opera dei pupi used the jargon, to transmit unwanted content by the authorities.

== Vocabulary ==
In 1897, a prostitutes revealed to judges some terms:

marca carnente
woman in love
maggiorigna
madame of a brothel
strambola
night
putrimento
bed
mutria
face
sopracielo
hat
sferra
stabbing knife
cerino
knife
lampanti
eyes
fangose, caminanti
"walkers", shoes
putea
police station
zaffi
policemen
carrubbi
carabinieri
sciacche
prostitutes
muffa
handkerchief
'ntiuno
watch
capezza
chain
grasciume
gold
sfogliose
bank notes
maniglie
old Italian liras
utri ca fossa
manslaughter, the punishment for traitors
