= Bamboo English =

Japanese Pidgin-English jargon

- Japanese Bamboo English; Korean Bamboo English
- Region: Japan (Bonin Islands), South Korea
- Era: since ca. 1950
- Language family: English-based pidgin

Language codes
- ISO 639-3: None (mis)
- Glottolog: None
- IETF: cpe-JP

Bamboo English was a Japanese English-based pidgin jargon developed after World War II that was spoken between American military personnel and Japanese on US military bases in occupied Japan. It has been thought to be a pidgin, though analysis of the language's features indicates it to be a pre-pidgin or a jargon rather than a stable pidgin.

It was exported to Korea during the Korean War by American military personnel as a method of communicating with Koreans. Here it acquired some Korean words, but remained largely based on English and Japanese. Recently, it has been most widely used in Okinawa Prefecture, where there is a significant U.S. military presence.

The Ogasawara Islands feature a similar form of Japanese Pidgin English referred to as Bonin English. This contact language was developed due to a back-and-forth shift in dominant languages between English and Japanese spanning over one hundred years.

The name Bamboo English was coined by Arthur M. Z. Norman, in the article in which he initially described the language.

== Phonology ==
With the differences between Japanese and English in terms of sounds included in each language and the placement of those sounds within words, the combination of the two within Bamboo English shows some differences between English-speaking and Japanese-speaking individuals even for the same words.

The ending consonants of words are often altered by Japanese speakers for English words that do not end with [n], [m], or [ŋ] (such as can, from, and song, respectively) by adding an /o/ or /u/ to the end of the word. This altering was picked up by English speakers, though applied without the knowledge of why it was done, such as in the case of saymo-saymo meaning 'same'.

Another similar alteration demonstrated in Bamboo English was the addition of the "ee" sound (as in cheese) to the end of English words. Words such as 'change', 'catch', and 'speak' then became changee, ketchee, and speakie.

As well, Japanese speakers mimicked some aspects of English speech by removing final vowels from some words, such as the word for 'car' which is normally jidōsha in Japanese but which is said as jidoš in Bamboo English.

== Morphology ==
Documentation of the morphology of Bamboo English is rather incomplete and so demonstrating the presence or absence of various characteristics is difficult.

Compounding, for example, has little record of existing within Bamboo English due to this. On the other hand, affixation has been better noted. The presence of the suffix -san, taken from Japanese, is often attached to terms of reference and address such as "mama", "papa", "boy", "girl", and "baby" to produce nouns such as mama-san or baby-san.

An additional morphological trait shown in Bamboo English is reduplication, though examples shown from the language indicate that this is not true reduplication as there are no forms of these words with only a single occurrence of the root. Such words are chop-chop meaning 'food', dame-dame meaning 'bad', and hubba-hubba meaning 'to hurry'.

== Syntax ==
As Bamboo English does not make significant use of inflection and the vocabulary was limited, words obtained multiple functions. Nouns often served in this as the initial use, with use as a verb, adjective, or adverb then developing. For example, chop-chop means 'food' but also 'to eat'. Other such dual-use words are hayaku meaning 'quickly' and also 'to hurry up', sayonara meaning 'absence' and 'to get rid of', and taksan meaning 'many, many', 'very', and 'large'.

=== Example phrases ===
Examples taken from Duke (1970), p. 170.

Bamboo English	Translation
How much you speak, papa-san?	Name your price
You number one washee-washee ketchee; number one presento hava-yes	If you do my washing satisfactorily, I'll pay you well

== See also ==
- Engrish
