= Butler English =

English-based pidgin language

- Bearer English; Kitchen English
- Region: Madras, India
- Era: Madras Presidency through 20th century
- Language family: English-based pidgin

Language codes
- ISO 639-3: None (mis)
- Glottolog: butl1235

Butler English, also known as Bearer English, or Kitchen English is a dialect of English that first developed as an occupational dialect during the British colonial period in India. It receives its name from the British head of household, butlers, as it was commonly used in conversation between English masters and their Indian household staff. It represents one of several varieties of English that emerged during this time, collectively referred to as Indian English.

== Examples ==
The following is an example of Butler English as given by writers Priya Hosali and J. Aitchinson:

One master call for come India ... eh England. I say not coming. That master very liking me. I not come. That is like for India — that hot and cold. That England for very cold.

— Priya Hosali and J. Aitchinson.,

Another example, now famous amongst Indian English linguists, is the one given by Hugo Schuchardt, in which a nurse (ayah) describes the butler's practice of secretly taking small amounts of milk for himself from his master's household:

Butler's yevery day taking one ollock for own-self, and giving servants all half half ollock; when I telling that shame for him, he is telling, Master's strictly order all servants for the little milk give it — what can I say ma'am, I poor ayah woman?

== Features ==
=== Pidgin features ===
Butler English shares many features that are common to other pidgin languages, such as reduction, simplification, and reduplication. There is also a marked lack of inflections or use of copulas. Additionally, there is some evidence for the usage of incipient independent constructions, which are common of minimal pidgin languages, such as the use of been as a past tense marker.

=== Other features ===
Mesthrie notes several "striking similarities" between Butler English and South African Indian English, raising for him the question of whether there was a historical relationship between the two. These include:

- use of "-ing" forms for things other than participles
- the omission of "be"
- the use of "got" as an auxiliary verb instead of "have" (Mesthrie questions the accuracy of the reports by Yule and Burnell that were the original source of the information that "done" was an auxiliary verb, observing that the 20th century reports by Hosali and others state that this is not a characteristic of 20th century Butler English.)
- various lexical similarities including "died" being used instead of "dead"

He notes various dissimilarities, however:

- Butler English uses "been" as an auxiliary verb whereas SAIE does not.
- Because of pronoun deletion, "is" can begin a sentence in Butler English, whereas such pronoun deletion is less common in SAIE.
- Butler English has no clear examples of "-s" as a possessive, whereas in SAIE that have a 15/17 occurrence rate.
- Butler English does not share SAIE's use of "only" as a focus marker
- Butler English does not share SAIE's use of "got" as an existential
- Butler English does not share SAIE's occasional subject–object–verb word order (e.g. four children got for "I have four children.", after pronoun deletion), although he observes that the famous quotation reported by Schuchardt contains one object–verb example: little milk give it
- Butler English does have various lexical forms found in SAIE, such as look-attering, no fadder, hawa, and dawa

== Controversies ==
=== Categorization ===
There is much discussion among scholars over whether Butler English can be categorized as a pidgin language. While it does share many features of a pidgin, there seems to be mixed evidence over whether or not it can be classified as a minimal pidgin, a basilect, or a form of broken English. According to Loreto Todd, professor of English at the University of Ulster "It is not certain whether or not Pidgin Englishes do exist or even have existed in India"

== See also ==
- Indian English
- Hinglish
