= Tây Bồi Pidgin French =

French-based pidgin of Vietnam

Tây Bồi
- Native to: Annam, French Cochinchina, Tonkin
- Extinct: 1980
- Language family: French pidgin: Tây Bồi

Language codes
- ISO 639-3: tas
- Glottolog: tayb1240
- Tây Bồi is classified as Extinct according to the UNESCO Atlas of the World's Languages in Danger

Tây Bồi (Vietnamese: tiếng Tây Bồi), or Vietnamese Pidgin French, is an extinct pidgin once spoken by non-French-educated Vietnamese, typically those who worked as servants in French households or milieux during the colonial era. Literally, it means 'French (Tây) [of- or spoken by] male servants (Bồi)'. During the French Indochina period, the majority of household servants for the French were male. The term is used by Vietnamese themselves to indicate that their spoken French language is poor, or grammatically incorrect. The French government or protectors opened French public schools (from pre-kindergarten through the Baccalaureat II) staffed by all native French speakers to take care of their compatriots/expatriates' children's education. Vietnamese children were admitted as well if they could pass the entrance examination tailored to their age and grade level. The Vietnamese elite class spoke French, and those with French Baccalaureat diplomas could attend French universities in France and in its colonies. After France's withdrawal from Indochina in 1954, Tây Bồi ceased to be used as a common language as standard French was used; Tây Bồi is believed to have become extinct around the 1980s.

== Etymology ==
Bồi is the Vietnamese phonetic spelling of the French word boy (from the English word), which refers to male household servants. It also means 'to add' as a verb in Vietnamese, which incidentally refers to how this pidgin worked.

== History ==
Tây Bồi developed in the 1860s around Saigon as French colonial officials in Vietnam began interacting with the local population. Those who could afford to learn French did if they interacted with the French often. Some were too poor to afford an education, and were therefore unable to learn French. To communicate with the French, a pidgin developed. Most of these poor people were servants, low-level administrators, soldiers or others from the working class.

The language began to decline after the French withdrawal from Vietnam after the First Indochina War. After this lack of use, warfare decreased the amount of speakers further. The last evidence of Tây Bồi's use was documented between 1975 and 1980. Before it went extinct, Tây Bồi was viewed as irrelevant by the French. Speakers were also hesitant to speak about it after the French withdrawal; it is therefore poorly attested in surviving research.

== Phonology ==
Consonants
		Bilabial	Labio-Dental	Dental	Alveolar	Postalveolar	Velar	Uvular
Plosive	Voiceless	p		t̪ (ṭ)	t		k	
Plosive	Voiced	b		d̪			g	
Fricatives	Voiceless		f	θ		ʃ		χ
Fricatives	Voiced		v	ð		ʒ	ɣ	
Laterals				l				
Trills					r			ʀ
Nasals		m		n	n		ŋ	
Semivowels		w				ɥ		

Vowels
	Front	Central	Back	
	Front	Central	Unrounded	Rounded
Close	i			u
Mid	e̞	ə	ɤ	o̞
Open Mid	ɛ			ɔ
Near-open		ɐ		
Open		a		

=== Tones ===
Tây Bồi contains the same five tones as the Southern dialects of Vietnamese: high-level, high rising, low-level, mid-rising, and low-rising tones.

== Features ==
Like Vietnamese, Tây Bồi had an SVO word order. Verbs were used in the infinitive with tense implied mostly through context. Its grammar and syntax are in general the same as Vietnamese grammar and syntax.

== Lexicon ==
In Tây Bồi was a French lexifier pidgin with minimal influences from Vietnamese, Chinese Pidgin English, Japanese and a Portuguese creole (which one, specifically, is not specified). Tây Bồi also sees a significantly reduced amount of words with many copulas being removed and words gaining several closely related meanings.

== Examples ==
Tây Bồi	Standard French	Literal English	Standard English
Moi faim	J'ai faim	Me hunger	I am hungry
Moi tasse	Ma tasse	Me cup	My cup
Lui avoir permission repos	Il a la permission de se reposer	Him have permission rest [noun]	He has permission to rest
Demain moi retour campagne	Demain, je retourne à la campagne	Tomorrow me return [noun] countryside	Tomorrow, I return to the countryside
Vous pas argent moi stop travail	Si vous ne me payez pas, j'arrêterai de travailler	You not money, me stop work [noun]	If you don't pay me, I'll stop working
Monsieur content aller danser	Monsieur est content d'aller danser	Mister happy to go to dance	The gentleman is happy to go dance
Lui la frapper	Il la frappe	Him her to hit	He hits her
Bon pas aller	Bon, n'y va pas	Good, not to go	Good, don't go
Pas travail	Je ne travaillerai pas	Not work [noun]	I won't work
Assez, pas connaître	Assez, je n'en sais rien	Enough, not to know	Enough, I don't know
Moi compris toi parler	J'ai compris ce que tu as dit	Me understood you to speak	I've understood what you've said

(Bickerton 1995: 163)

== See also ==
- French Indochina
- French language
- Vietnamese language
- Vietglish
- Butler English, a similar phenomenon in colonized India
