= Queensland Kanaka English =

Extinct English-based pidgin of Australia

- Region: Queensland, Australia
- Era: from 1860s
- Language family: English-based pidgin: Pacific; Queensland Kanaka English
- Writing system: Latin

Language codes
- ISO 639-3: None (mis)
- Glottolog: quee1234

Queensland Kanaka English, Queensland Canefields English or Queensland Plantation Pidgin English is an English-based pidgin language that was spoken by Melanesian labourers in Queensland, Australia from the late 1860s.

== See also ==
- Blackbirding
- Kanakas

== Sources ==
- Dutton, Thomas E. (1980). Queensland Canefields English of the late nineteenth century. Pacific Linguistics.
- Dutton, Thomas E.; Mühlhäusler, Peter (1984). "Queensland Kanaka English". English World-Wide. 4 (2): 231–264. doi:10.1075/eww.4.2.05dut.
