= Basque–Icelandic pidgin =

17th-century Basque-based pidgin

- Region: Iceland, Atlantic
- Ethnicity: Basques, Icelanders
- Era: 17th century
- Language family: Basque-based pidgin

Language codes
- ISO 639-3: None (mis)
- Glottolog: icel1248 Icelandic–Basque Pidgin basq1251 Basque Nautical Pidgin
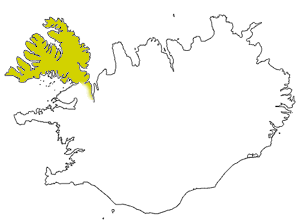
- Westfjords, the Icelandic region that produced the manuscript containing the Basque–Icelandic pidgin

The Basque–Icelandic pidgin (Basque: euskara-islandiera pidgin, islandiera-euskara pidgin; Icelandic: Basknesk-íslenskt blendingsmál) was a Basque-based pidgin spoken in Iceland during the 17th century. It consisted of Basque, Germanic, and Romance words.

Basque whale hunters who sailed to the Icelandic Westfjords used the pidgin as a means of rudimentary communication with locals. It might have developed in Westfjords, where manuscripts were written in the language, but since it had influences from many other European languages, it is more likely that it was created elsewhere and brought to Iceland by Basque sailors. Basque entries are mixed with words from Dutch, English, French, German and Spanish. The Basque–Icelandic pidgin is therefore not a mixture of Basque and Icelandic, but between Basque and other languages. It was so named because it was written in Iceland and translated into Icelandic.

Only a few manuscripts have been found containing Basque–Icelandic glossary, and knowledge of the pidgin is limited.

== Basque whalers in Iceland ==
Whaling, long an important industry in the Basque Country, is shown on the shields of the villages of Ondarroa (top), Getaria, France (middle) and Getaria, Spain (bottom).

Basque whalers were among the first to catch whales commercially; they spread to the far parts of the North Atlantic and even reached Brazil. They started coming to Iceland around the year 1600. In 1615, after becoming shipwrecked and getting into a conflict with the locals, some Basque sailors were massacred in an event that would be known as the Slaying of the Spaniards. Basques continued to sail to Iceland, but for the second half of the 17th century French and Spanish whalers are more often mentioned in Icelandic sources.

== History of the glossaries ==
Only a few anonymous glossaries have been found. Two of them were found among the documents of 18th century scholar Jón Ólafsson of Grunnavík, titled:

- Vocabula Gallica ('French words'). Written during the latter part of the 17th century, a total of 16 pages containing 517 words and short sentences, and 46 numerals.
- Vocabula Biscaica ('Biscayan [Basque] words'). A copy written during the 18th century by Jón Ólafsson, the original is lost. It contains a total of 229 words and short sentences, and 49 numerals. This glossary contains several pidgin words and phrases.

These manuscripts were found in the mid-1920s by the Icelandic philologist Jón Helgason in the Arnamagnæan Collection at the University of Copenhagen. He copied the glossaries, translated the Icelandic words into German and sent the copies to C. C. Uhlenbeck at Leiden University in the Netherlands. Uhlenbeck had expertise in Basque, but since he retired from the university in 1926, he gave the glossaries to his student Nicolaas Gerard Hendrik Deen. Deen consulted with the Basque scholar Julio de Urquijo, and in 1937, Deen published his doctoral thesis on the Basque–Icelandic glossaries. It was titled Glossaria duo vasco-islandica and written in Latin, though most of the phrases of the glossaries were also translated into German and Spanish.

In 1986, Jón Ólafsson's manuscripts were brought back from Denmark to Iceland.

The manuscript with the glossaries (University of Iceland):

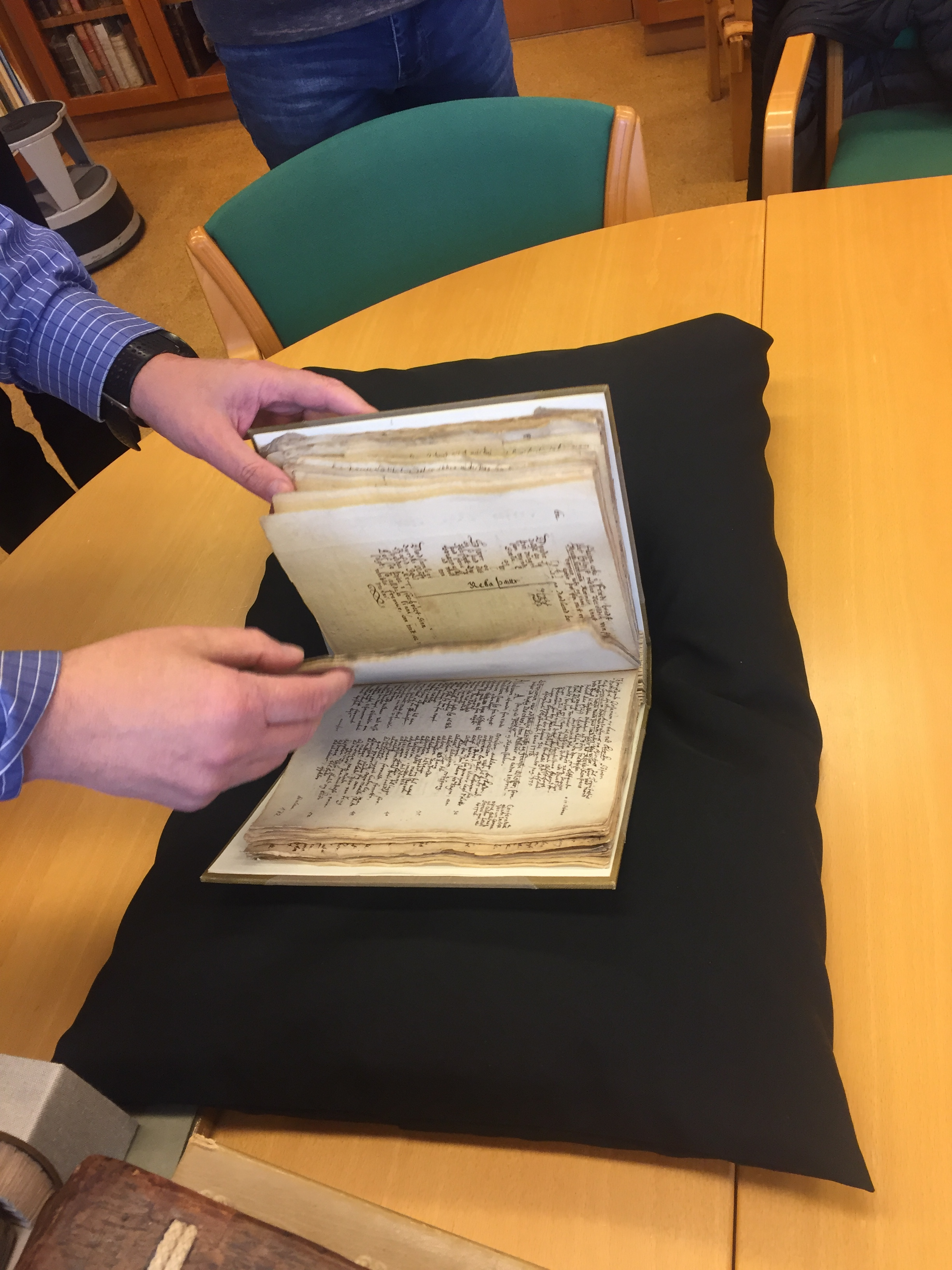

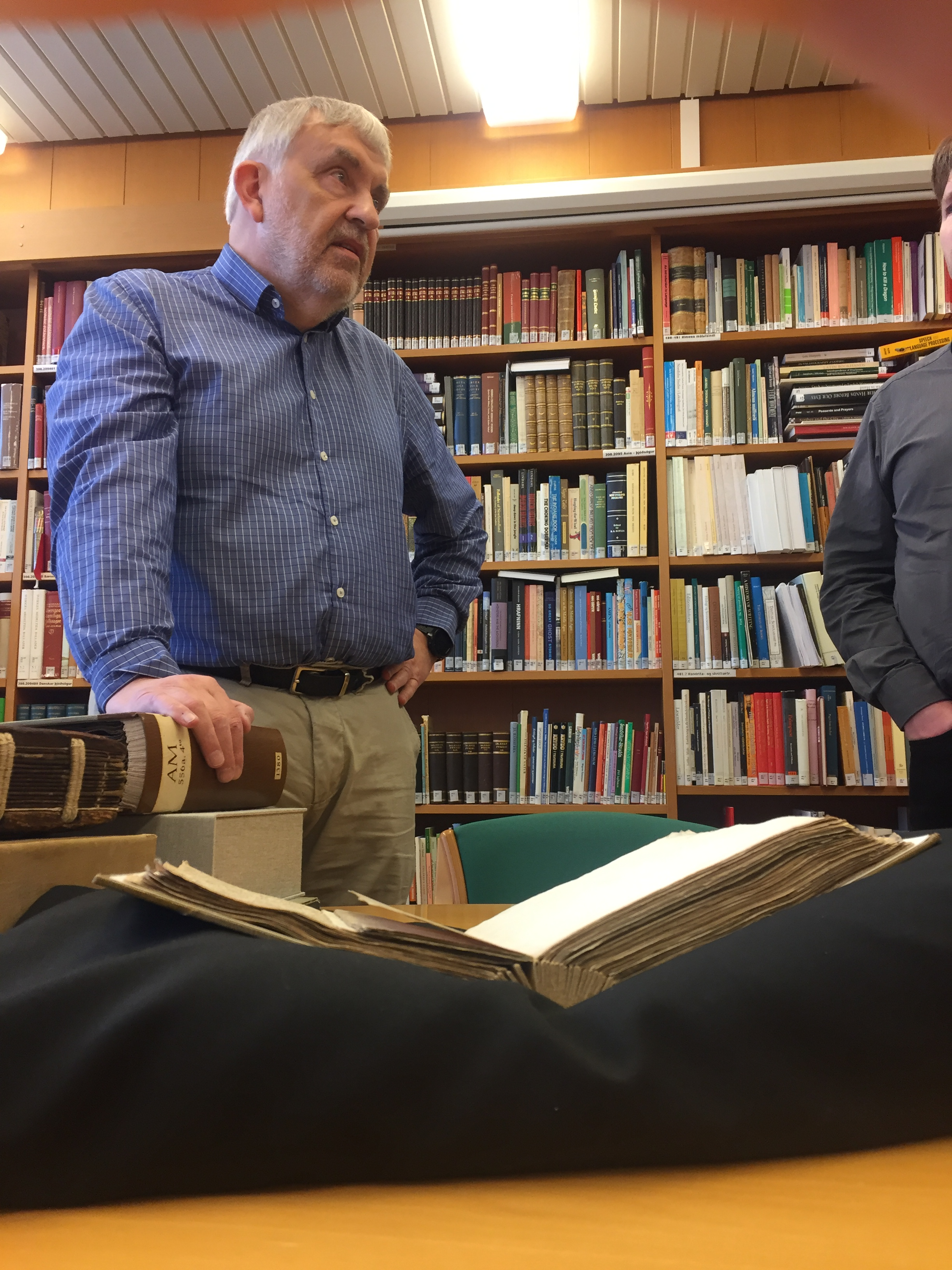

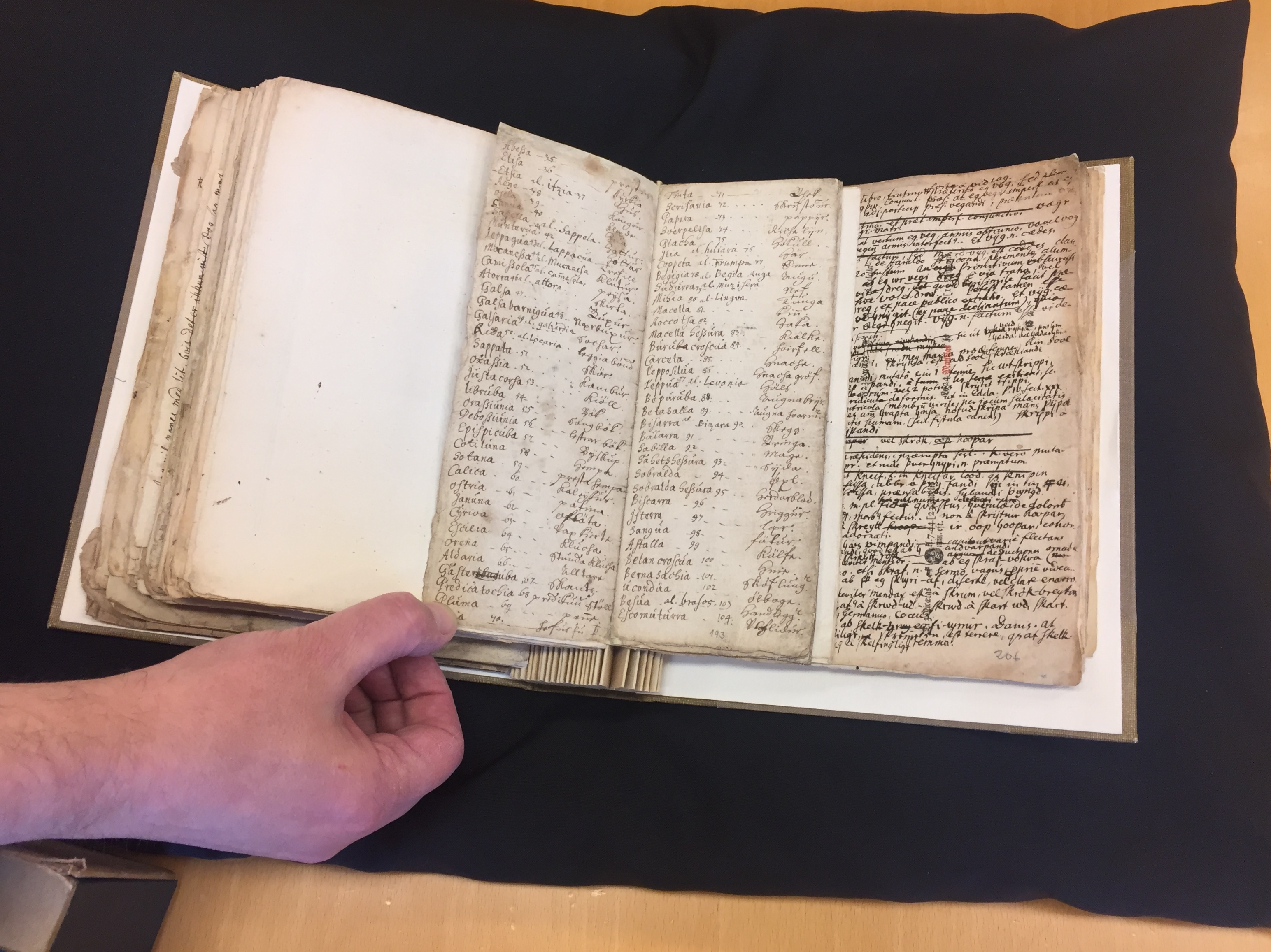

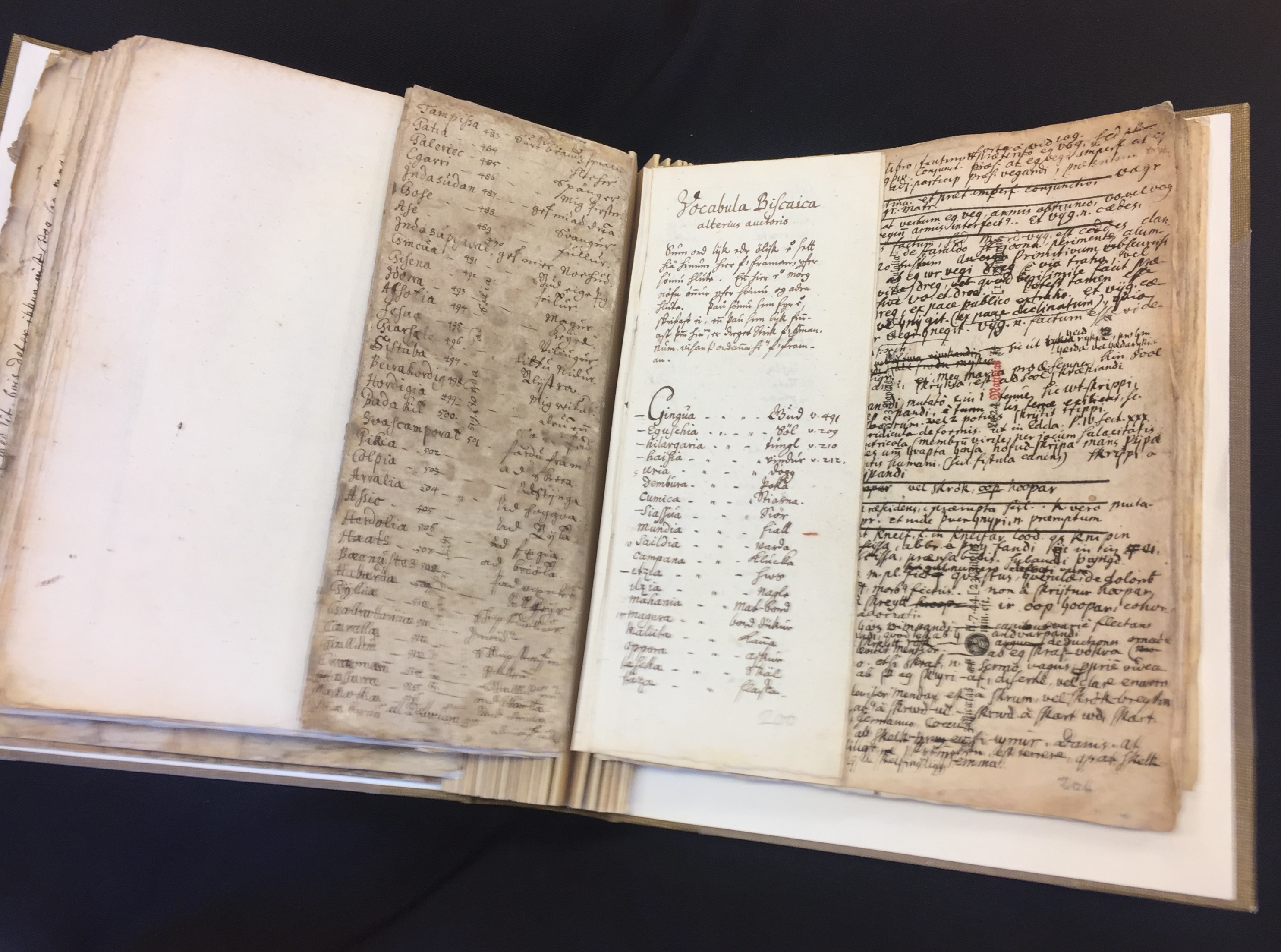

There is also evidence of a third contemporary Basque–Icelandic glossary. In a letter, the Icelandic linguist Sveinbjörn Egilsson mentioned a document with two pages containing "funny words and glosses" (Note: The two pages can be seen here.) and he copied eleven examples of them. The glossary itself has been lost, but the letter is still preserved at the National Library of Iceland. There is no pidgin element in the examples he copies.

=== The fourth glossary ===
A fourth Basque–Icelandic glossary was found at the Houghton Library at Harvard University. It had been collected by the German historian Konrad von Maurer when he visited Iceland in 1858, the manuscript is from the late 18th century or the early 19th century. The glossary was discovered around 2008, the original owner had not identified the manuscript as containing Basque text. Only two of the pages contain Basque–Icelandic glossary; the material surrounding includes unrelated items such as instructions about magic and casting love spells. It is clear that the copyist was not aware that they were copying Basque glossary, as the text has the heading "A few Latin glosses". Many of the entries are corrupted or wrong, seemingly made by someone not used to writing. A large number of the entries are not a part of Deen's glossary, and so the manuscript is thought to be a copy of an unknown Basque–Icelandic glossary. A total of 68 words and phrases can be discerned, but with some uncertainty.

== Pidgin phrases ==
The manuscript Vocabula Biscaica contains the following phrases which contain a pidgin element:

Basque glossary	Modern Basque	Icelandic glossary	Standard Icelandic orthography	English translation (Note: Based on the Icelandic text, which differs in some places from the Basque equivalents.)	Word number (Note: In Jón Ólafsson's manuscript.)
Presenta for mi	Emaidazu	Giefdu mier	Gefðu mér	Give me	193 & 225
Bocata for mi attora	Garbitu iezaidazu atorra	Þvodu fyrer mig skyrtu	Þvoðu fyrir mig skyrtu	Wash a shirt for me	196
Fenicha for ju	Izorra hadi!	Liggia þig	Liggja þig	Fuck you! (Note: The phrases fenicha for ju - liggia þig were among the few entries in the glossaries that Deen did not translate to German or Spanish in his doctoral thesis. Instead he wrote cum te coire 'to sleep with you' in Latin. However, Miglio believes that the phrase rather should be understood as an insult.)	209
Presenta for mi locaria	Emaizkidazu lokarriak	Giefdu mier socka bond	Gefðu mér sokkabönd	Give me garters	216
Ser ju presenta for mi	Zer emango didazu?	Hvad gefur þu mier	Hvað gefur þú mér?	What do you give me?	217
For mi presenta for ju biskusa eta sagarduna	Bizkotxoa eta sagardoa emango dizkizut	Eg skal gefa þier braudkoku og Syrdryck	Ég skal gefa þér brauðköku og súrdrykk	I will give you a biscuit and a sour drink (Note: The Basque word sagarduna means 'cider', but the Icelandic word syrdryck means 'sour drink'.)	218
Trucka cammisola	Jertse bat erosi	Kaufftu peisu	Kauptu peysu	Buy a sweater	219
Sumbatt galsardia for	Zenbat galtzerdietarako?	Fyrer hvad marga socka	Fyrir hvað marga sokka?	For how many socks?	220
Cavinit trucka for mi	Ez dut ezer erosiko	Eckert kaupe eg	Ekkert kaupi ég	I buy nothing	223
Christ Maria presenta for mi Balia, for mi, presenta for ju bustana	Kristok eta Mariak balea ematen badidate, buztana emango dizut	Gefe Christur og Maria mier hval, skal jeg gefa þier spordenn	Gefi Kristur og María mér hval, skal ég gefa þér sporðinn	If Christ and Mary give me a whale, I will give you the tail	224
For ju mala gissuna	Gizon gaiztoa zara	Þu ert vondur madur	Þú ert vondur maður	You are an evil man	226
Presenta for mi berrua usnia eta berria bura	Emadazu esne beroa eta gurin berria	Gefdu mier heita miölk og nyt smior	Gefðu mér heita mjólk og nýtt smjör	Give me hot milk and new butter	227
Ser travala for ju	Zertan egiten duzu lan?		Hvað gjörir þú?	What do you do?	228

A majority of these words are of Basque origin:

- atorra, atorra 'shirt'
- balia, balea 'baleen whale'
- berria, berria 'new'
- berrua, beroa 'warm'
- biskusa, (Lapurdian) loan word bizkoxa 'biscuit', nowadays meaning gâteau Basque (cf. Spanish bizcocho, ultimately from Medieval Latin biscoctus)
- bocata (Note: Deen suggests that bocata is bokhetatu with the Spanish translation colar 'sieve', 'percolate' or 'pass'. The Icelandic equivalent is þvodu 'wash!'.)
- bustana, buztana 'tail'
- eta, eta 'and'
- galsardia, galtzerdia 'the sock'
- gissuna, gizona 'the man'
- locaria, lokarria 'the tie/lace(s)'
- sagarduna, sagardoa 'the cider'
- ser, zer 'what'
- sumbatt, zenbat 'how many'
- travala, old Basque trabaillatu, related to French and Spanish trabajar 'to work'
- usnia, esnea 'the milk'
- bura, 'butter', from Basque Lapurdian loan word burra (Note: The loan word burra is documented in the Northern Basque Country Basque-language written tradition since the mid-17th century.) (cf. French beurre, Italian burro and Occitan burre)

Some of the words are of Germanic origin:

- cavinit, old Dutch equivalent of modern German gar nichts 'nothing at all' or Low German kein bit niet 'not a bit'
- for in the sentence sumbatt galsardia for could be derived from many different Germanic languages
- for mi, English 'for me' (used both as subject and object; 'I' and 'me') or Low German 'för mi'
- for ju, English 'for you' (used both as subject and object) or Low German 'för ju'

And others come from the Romance languages:

- cammisola, Spanish camisola 'shirt'
- fenicha, Spanish fornicar 'to fornicate'
- mala, French or Spanish mal 'bad' or 'evil'
- trucka, Spanish trocar 'to exchange' (Note: Could also be derived from Basque trukea 'the exchange'.)

All nouns and adjectives in the pidgin are marked with Basque's definite article suffix -a, even in cases for which the suffix would be ungrammatical in Basque. The order of nouns and adjectives is also reversed. For example, pidgin berrua usnia ('warm milk-DET') versus Basque esne beroa ('milk warm-DET').

Although there are quite a few Spanish and French words listed in the glossaries, this is not a sign of the pidgin language, but rather a result of French and Spanish influence on the Basque language throughout the ages, since Basque has taken many loan words from its neighbouring languages. Furthermore, many of the people in the Basque crews that came to Iceland might have been multilingual, speaking French and/or Spanish as well. That would explain for example why the Icelandic ja 'yes' is translated with both Basque bai and French vÿ (modern spelling oui) at the end of Vocabula Biscaica.

== Other examples ==
These examples are from the recently discovered Harvard manuscript:

Basque glossary	Correct 17th century Basque	Icelandic glossary	Standard Icelandic orthography	English translation
Nola dai fussu	Nola deitzen zara zu?	hvad heitir þu	Hvað heitir þú?	What's your name?
Jndasu edam	Indazu eda-te-ra	gief mier ad drecka	Gef mér að drekka	Give me (something) to drink
Jndasu jaterra	Indazu ja-te-ra	gief mier ad eta	Gef mér að eta	Give me (something) to eat
Jndasunirj	Indazu niri	syndu mier	Sýndu mér	Show me
Huna Temin	Hunat jin	kom þu hingad	Kom þú hingað	Come here
Balja	Balea	hvalur	hvalur	A whale
Chatucumia	katakume (Note: In modern Basque.)	kietlingur	kettlingur	A kitten
Bai	Bai	ja	já	Yes
Es	Ez	nei	nei	No

The first phrase, nola dai fussu ("What's your name?"), might be written with standardized (but ungrammatical) Basque as "Nola deitu zu?". That is a morphologically simplified construction of the correct Basque sentence "Nola deitzen zara zu?".

A section in Vocabula Biscaica goes over a few obscenities:

Basque glossary	Icelandic glossary	English translation	Word number
Sickutta Samaria	serda merina	go fuck a horse	211
gianzu caca	jettu skÿt	eat shit	212
caca hiarinsat	et þu skÿt ur rasse	eat shit from an asshole	213
jet sat	kuss þu ä rass	kiss [my] ass	214

== See also ==
- Algonquian–Basque pidgin, a Basque-based pidgin in Canada
- Russenorsk, a Russian–Norwegian pidgin
