= Bonin English =

English and Japanese-based creole dialects of the Bonin Islands

- Ogasawara English
- Native to: Japan
- Region: Bonin Islands (Ogasawara islands)
- Ethnicity: Bonin Islanders
- Language family: English Creole: Pacific; Micronesian Pidgin English?; Bonin English

Language codes
- ISO 639-3: None (mis)
- Glottolog: boni1239
- IETF: cpe-u-sd-jp13

Bonin English, also known as the Bonin Islands language or Ogasawara English, is a group of English varieties spoken on the Bonin Islands (or Ogasawara Islands) of Japan, in the country's far south. This includes Bonin Pidgin English, Bonin Creoloid English, and Bonin Standard English. Besides Bonin English, varieties of Japanese are spoken on the islands, as well as a mixed language called Osagawara Mixed Language.

== History ==
The Colony of Peel Island was the first permanent settlement on the Bonin Islands. Chichijima (then called Peel Island) was settled in the early nineteenth century by speakers of various European and Austronesian languages, including American English and Hawaiian. This resulted in a pidgin English that became a symbol of island identity. Starting in the 1860s, thousands of Japanese speakers settled the islands, bringing various Japanese dialects along with them. During this time, the pidgin English of the islands creolized among second- and third-generation speakers. The Japanese settlers set up schools and urged all islanders (most of which illiterate) to have their children attend them. At school, children were taught both Japanese and English, and many of the islanders became bilingual. Because of this, Bonin English incorporated elements of Japanese during the early twentieth century. Throughout the 20th century, most islanders used Bonin English at home while they used Japanese at school and work. During the US occupation of 1946–68, the so-called "Navy Generation" learned American English at school, for example developing an /l/–/r/ distinction and a rhotic /r/ that their parents did not have. At this time, Japanese residents of the islands were forced to evacuate to the mainland and were not able to return until the Bonin Islands were returned to Japan. After the end of the US occupation, there was an increase in Japanese language education and Japanese residents on the islands. Today, younger residents tend to be monolingual in a variety of Japanese closely resembling the Tokyo standard, with some learning standard English as a foreign language at school. A bilingual spoken dictionary was published in 2005.

== Varieties ==
Bonin English is an umbrella term for the various varieties of English spoken on the Bonin Islands. Tokyo Metropolitan University linguist Daniel Long has defined the below varieties of Bonin English. However, as he states, these are theoretical divisions. In practice, these labels are points along a continuum. Speakers themselves do not necessarily see them as different varieties, but rather as different ways of speaking.

=== Bonin Pidgin English ===
Bonin Pidgin English is the name given to the early English variety that emerged on the Bonin islands in the 19th century, influenced by various Pacific and European languages such as Portuguese and Hawaiian. This was actually not a single stable pidgin with a homogeneous grammar. New settlers on the islands constantly introduced new types of English, which contributed to the diversity of the English of the Bonin islands. However, it is thought that a kind of homogenized variety did emerge because restricted communication with the outside world would have made the contact among residents intense, and their speech would have started to resemble each other’s. Nevertheless, it remained relatively close to other English dialects, such as those from New England and southeast England, and was understood by outsiders.

=== Bonin Creoloid English ===
Bonin Creoloid English was an English-based creoloid used mostly by second-generation settlers on the islands. It was spoken in the 19th and early 20th centuries but is now no longer in use. It was brought about due to historically continuous immigration and visits to the islands by English speakers. It emerged out of the abrupt creolization of Bonin Pidgin English that was used amongst migrants. This means that Bonin Pidgin English became the native language of children in the community before it had a chance to stabilize. It is not considered a creole language as it does not have a reconstructed grammar, but a creoloid language that shows evidence of nonnative influences such as those from Hawaiian and Guamanian varieties of English. It probably coexisted alongside mainstream varieties of English and despite their minority there was contact with native English-speakers, which is why its structure is relatively similar.

In the 20th century, Bonin English was influenced by Japanese, causing some pronunciations that differ from both mainstream English and Japanese-accented English. Additionally, many words used in Bonin English are believed to be derived from Pacific Island languages, which the Bonin Islanders were in contact with from the early 19th century. These include mainly names of local plants and animals, as well as some place names.

=== Bonin Standard English ===
Bonin Standard English is an English dialect which has been present since the Navy Generation. Due to the English education provided by the US occupation, the languages on the island became stratified, with Bonin English Creoloid becoming a substrate language and American English becoming the superstrate language. This resulted in a de-creoloidized form of English, Bonin Standard English.

== Japanese on the Bonin Islands ==
=== Ogasawara Koiné Japanese ===
Ogasawara Koiné Japanese was a koineized form of Japanese spoken among Japanese islanders who spoke various Japanese dialects. Before World War II, most Japanese settlers came from Hachijō-jima and Aoga-shima and spoke Hachijō dialects. Out of the contact between these Japanese dialects, Ogasawara Koiné Japanese emerged. The Japanese settlers were repatriated back to Japan during the US occupation, but many returned when the islands came under Japanese rule again in 1968. New settlers from different Japanese regions also joined and eventually outnumbered the original settlers. While there was a large influence of the Hachijō dialect influence by other Japanese dialects can be seen in some dialectal differences in meaning and speech. Additionally, as Westerners on the islands acquired this koiné as a second language, its influence on the Navy Generation's speech can be seen in their borrowing of English vocabulary and expressions and usage of non-standard Japanese syntax.

=== Ogasawara Standard Japanese ===
Ogasawara Standard Japanese is a dialect based on standard Japanese. On a basic level, it is included under the Shutoken dialect umbrella, which comprises the Japanese spoken in the Tokyo metropolitan area. However, a considerable amount of names of flora and fauna as well as semantic and pragmatic particularities are characteristic of Ogasawara speech. Even though Westerners still live on the islands, it is common to see only Ogasawara Standard Japanese being spoken within the generations of islanders after the Japanese islanders returned to the islands after the occupation, as many were raised monolingual.

In the time period before World War II and the Navy Generation, English and Japanese varieties were used diglossically. Bonin English Creoloid and Ogasawara Japanese Koiné were used as low varieties, while Bonin Standard English and Ogasawara Standard Japanese were used as high varieties.

== Ogasawara Mixed Language ==
Ogasawara Mixed Language (OML) is a mixed language of Bonin Creoloid English and Bonin Koiné Japanese that emerged when Japanese became the dominant language among young people instead of English, but many remained competent in English as well. OML follows Japanese sentence structure. Both Japanese and English syntax and phonotactics are preserved and frequent mixing of both languages in discourse has been recorded. In OML, phonological systems of Japanese and English are preserved, so that words of Japanese origin are pronounced according to Japanese phonological rules and those of English origin according to English rules. Words of other origins have varying pronunciations.

A striking feature of OML is the usage of the English first-person pronoun me instead of I, as can be seen in the example below. Case is marked with Japanese particles instead.

Me	wa	chanto	shinai	to.
‘Me, I have to do it properly.’

In foundational research on Ogasawara Mixed Language, Daniel Long proposed that with the influence of code switching and loan words, there were already many English elements borrowed into the Japanese spoken by native speakers and Westerners on the islands. Additionally, the Navy Generation, raised with Ogasawara Japanese Koiné as their first language, had received an English education at school and interacted with speakers who mixed Japanese and English in their speech, so Japanese and English mixed speech became common. As a result, Long hypothesized that Ogasawara Mixed Language was homogenized and formalized by the time the islands were returned to Japan after World War II. With the Bonin Islands being returned to Japan in 1968 and the Japanese outnumbering Westerners, OML is falling out of use and may disappear when the elderly speakers are gone.
