= Yokohama Pidgin Japanese =

Japanese pidgin of Yokohama, Japan

- Yokohamese, Japanese Ports Lingo
- Native to: Japan
- Region: Yokohama
- Extinct: End of the 19th century
- Language family: Japanese-based pidgin

Language codes
- ISO 639-3: None (mis)
- Glottolog: yoko1234
- IETF: crp-u-sd-jp14

Yokohama Pidgin Japanese, Yokohamese or Japanese Ports Lingo was a Japanese-based pre-pidgin spoken in the Yokohama region during the late 19th century for communication between Japanese and foreigners, mainly English speaking westerners and Chinese traders. Documentation of Yokohama Pidgin Japanese shows that it was not a stable pidgin, as it often varied between individual speakers, often dependent on the first language of the speaker.

Andrei Avaram, a linguist from the University of Bucharest, referred to Yokohama Pidgin Japanese and Japanese Pidgin English as "Two sides of the same coin," both being contact languages used by traders, with little dominance between the contributing languages.

Most of the first-hand information on the pidgin comes from "Exercises in the Yokohama Dialect", a humorous booklet published in 1879 by Hoffman Atkinson.
