= Papuan Pidgin English =

English-based pidgin of New Guinea

- Native to: British New Guinea
- Region: Samarai, Kiwai, Daru and parts of Port Moresby
- Era: 1880–1925
- Language family: English-based pidgin: Pacific; Papuan Pidgin English

Language codes
- ISO 639-3: None (mis)
- Glottolog: papu1254

Papuan Pidgin English was a 19th-century English-based pidgin of New Guinea. It was eventually replaced by Hiri Motu, a Melanesian-based pidgin, and was not ancestral to modern English-based Tok Pisin.
