= Native American Pidgin English =

English-based pidgin of the USA

- Native to: United States
- Extinct: (date missing)
- Language family: English pidgin

Language codes
- ISO 639-3: None (mis)
- Glottolog: amer1255

Native American Pidgin English, sometimes known as American Indian Pidgin English (AIPE) was an English-based pidgin spoken by Europeans and Native Americans in western North America. The main geographic regions in which AIPE was spoken was British Columbia, Oregon, and Washington.

AIPE is mentioned in World Englishes as one of many factors influencing American English.

Native American Pidgin English is much more similar to English than are many other English-based pidgins, and it could be considered a mere ethnolect of American English.

The earliest variety of Pidgin English to appear in British North America is AIPE. AIPE was used by both Europeans and the Native Americans in the contact situation and is therefore considered to be a true pidgin. A pidgin language is made up of two languages sometimes spoken by only one group. However, because AIPE was spoken by both groups, some would say that makes it as a true pidgin. The European people are the ones who taught the Native Americans how to speak English. They developed AIPE together, which helped them communicate more efficiently.

== Phonology ==
Native American Pidgin English’s phonology is characterized primarily by decreasing the English phonemic record from definite exchanges and the loss of some phonemes, together with other distributed phenomena.

== See also ==
- English-based pidgins and creoles
- Chinook Jargon

== Sources ==
- Kirkpatrick, Andy. The Routledge Handbook of World Englishes. Milton Park, Abingdon, Oxon: Routledge, 2010. ISBN 978-0-203-84932-3 (page 56)
- Dillard, Joey Lee. Toward a Social History of American English. Berlin, New York, Amsterdam: Mouton, 1985. ISBN 0-89925-046-7
- Englishes. Milton Park, Abingdon, Oxon: Routledge, 2010. ISBN 978-0-203-84932-3 (page 56)
- Gramley. S. Varieties of American English. WS 2009‐2010. http://wwwhomes.uni-bielefeld.de/sgramley/VarAmE-01-Introduction.pdf
- Jump up ^ Hammarström, Harald; Forkel, Robert; Haspelmath, Martin, eds. (2017). American Indian Pidgin English. Glottolog 3.0. Jena, Germany: Max Planck Institute for the Science of Human History.
- Leechman, Douglas, and Robert A. Hall. American Indian Pidgin English: Attestations and Grammatical Peculiarities. American Speech 30, no. 3 (1955): 163-71. doi:10.2307/453934
