= Port Jackson Pidgin English =

English-based Australian pidgin

- New South Wales Pidgin
- Region: Australia
- Ethnicity: Aboriginal Australians
- Era: 1780-1900
- Language family: English-based pidgin: Pacific; Port Jackson Pidgin English

Language codes
- ISO 639-3: None (mis)
- Glottolog: news1234 New South Wales Pidgin

Port Jackson Pidgin English or New South Wales Pidgin English was an English-based pidgin that originated in the region of Sydney and Newcastle in New South Wales in the early days of colonisation. Stockmen carried it west and north as they expanded across Australia. It subsequently died out in most of the country, but was creolized forming Australian Kriol in the Northern Territory at the Roper River Mission in Ngukurr, where missionaries provided a safe place for Indigenous Australians from the surrounding areas to escape deprivation at the hands of European settlers. As the Aboriginal Australians who came to seek refuge at the Roper River Mission spoke different languages, there grew a need for a shared communication system to develop, and it was this that created the conditions for Port Jackson Pidgin English to become fleshed out into a full language, Kriol, based on the English language and the eight different Australian language groups spoken by those at the mission.

== History ==
Port Jackson Pidgin English was established as the need for communication between Aboriginal people and English settlers arose. Its first records of existence date to 1788 in the Port Jackson penal colony. By 1900 PJPE had developed into Northern Territory Pidgin English (NTPE) was widespread and well understood. Then by 1908 creolizing into Australian Kriol and by the mid-1980s, Kriol had at least four generations of mother tongue speakers.

=== Historical factors ===
There are two major factors that facilitated the forming of Port Jackson Pidgin English. The first is that environmental shifts occurred on the land. After the English settlers arrived at Port Jackson in January 1788, the lifestyles of the Aboriginal people in the Sydney area changed significantly. The environment was devastated as the settlers cleared the ground for settlement. As a result, the local ecosystem could no longer provide food for the Aboriginal people, and they became increasingly dependent on the settlers for imported goods. Some Aboriginal people started to offer services to the settlers, including guidance and knowledge about the environment. Thus, in exchange for resources, they played an important role in the settlers’ community. As they were being increasingly exposed to the English language, the Aboriginal people began acquiring English as a lingua franca to communicate with the settlers. In this way, Port Jackson Pidgin English started forming at the point of contact between English and the Aboriginal languages. Linguistic evidence supports this summation, showing that pidgin features, including language mixing, language simplification and lexicon borrowing were present in the communication between the Aboriginal people and the settlers.

The second factor was the actions the governor of the First Fleet, Arthur Philip, took to establish communication with Aboriginal people. After fixing a permanent settlement site at Port Jackson, Philip gave official orders for establishing a stable cross-cultural communication with Aboriginal people despite their hostility towards the settlers. He also controlled the convicts to prevent them from ‘taking advantage of or mistreating Aboriginal people’. However, due to the absence of a common language between the two communities, he failed to learn about the Aboriginal culture and history or maintain regular and friendly communication. Therefore, he made a plan to capture an Aboriginal person to learn English, help the settlers acquire the Aboriginal language and play as a cultural catalyst between the two communities. The person the settlers captured was Bennelong. He not only learned English and the culture of the settlers, but he also offered knowledge about the Aboriginal language for the settlers. He marked the starting point of a stable communication and accelerated the language contact between the two communities.

=== Bennelong as the communication catalyst ===
Bennelong was an important figure in this cross-cultural communication. He soon came to play a major role in the colony and integrated into the new society well after being captured by Philip. His language abilities not only allowed the settlers to gain more knowledge about the Aboriginal language and culture but also accelerated the cross-cultural interactions between the two communities. Being able to speak two languages, Bennelong became a well-respected person in both the colonial and Aboriginal communities. The settlers needed Bennelong’s knowledge of Aboriginal culture, food, technology and the environment, while the Aboriginal people consulted him when they traded with the settlers. This privilege allowed him to become the head of the Aboriginal coterie, and he enjoyed social and material benefits from his friendship with Philip.

=== Influences on both communities ===
From the linguistic aspect, Aboriginal people who acted as translators and guides in the Sydney area showed a notable ability to communicate with English settlers using Port Jackson Pidgin English. Furthermore, the significance of learning Aboriginal vernacular language decreased and was eventually replaced by the pidgin. From the social aspect, some of the Aboriginal people became functioning members in the colony’s working class because of their knowledge of the land and labour. In addition, with the information provided by the Aboriginal people, the settlers found building materials, and they built residences in water-rich and fertile areas. In the settlement, Aboriginal people offered assistance with chopping wood, fishing and tracking escaped convicts. With the help of the Aboriginal people, the settlers built permanent sites of residence, and the Aboriginal people gained irreplaceable positions in the social division of labour within the colony.

== Grammar ==
Port Jackson Pidgin English has a relatively complete linguistic structure, including a borrowed lexicon and set of verbs, largely from English. It also contains different word classes, including pronouns, adverbs, adjectives and prepositions and uses the same subject–verb–object sentence structure as English. The linguistic feature of Port Jackson Pidgin English observed in the 18th century was mainly lexical, and in the 19th century, the pidgin started to acquire syntactical stability.

=== Morphology ===
Both free morphemes and bound morphemes are attested in Port Jackson Pidgin English, but most morphemes are free. Three examples of bound morphemes are -fela, -im and -it. The first morpheme is a suffix that nominalises nouns, which is retrieved from the English word 'fellow'. For example, blakfela means "Aboriginal people', and datfela means 'that one'. The second and the third morphemes are transitivity markers. There are also compound words and single morphemes that are from English in the pidgin. For example, the word that is used to refer to convicts is gabamenman, which literally means 'government man', a compound word that consists of gabamen and man. An example of a single morpheme is 'baimbai. It literally means "by and by" though its actual meaning is "later".

=== Determiners ===
There is evidence that determiners are present in Port Jackson Pidgin English. For example, dat and diz respectively originate from the English words 'that' and 'these'. Possessive determiners also exist. For instance, main indicates the first-person singular possessive form in the pidgin, which is retrieved from the English word 'my'.

=== Numbers ===
The numbers in Port Jackson Pidgin English are largely borrowed from English. For example, menitausand comes from 'many thousand', and wan comes from 'one'. However, non-specific quantifiers are formulated by different strategies. For example, oranjibita consists of narang, which means 'little' in the Aboriginal language, and bit of from English . As the word contains lexical items from both languages, it is unique from specific numbers, which are borrowed solely from English.

=== Pronouns ===
The pronouns in Port Jackson Pidgin English have considerable similarity to those of English. For example, the pronoun for the first-person singular is ai or mi, and that for the first-person plural is wi. It is obvious that those words are retrieved respectively from the English 'I', 'me' and 'we'.

=== Verbs ===
It is also intriguing to note that despite its borrowing of English verbs, Port Jackson Pidgin English applies linguistic strategies that are different. Therefore, the use or meaning of verbs in Port Jackson Pidgin English cannot be presumed based solely on knowledge of English. In addition to directly borrowing from English, such as teik, retrieved from 'take', there are two more ways by which verbs are created. The first is the borrowing of English phrasal verbs: for instance, sitdaun, coming from 'sit down', means "stay". The other way is to creating verbs from words in Aboriginal languages: for example, the verb for "dance" is koroberi, from the noun garabara meaning "dance" in the Dharug language. Another interesting aspect to explore in the verbs in Port Jackson Pidgin English is transitivity. For example, in the sentence Yu laik blakfela massa yu gibit konmil yu gibit mogo and mok, which means 'If you like Aboriginal people, master, you give [them] cornmeal; you give [them] tomahawks and tobacco'. In that case, the verb's transitivity is marked by the suffix '-it'. In addition, tense and aspect are attested in the pidgin. For instance, ai meikit no wot hi/it baut means "I will make known what he is doing". In that case, baut is the present continuous form of do, which marks both the present tense and the imperfective aspect.

=== Sentence structure ===
Port Jackson Pidgin English shares the same subject–verb–object sentence structure of English. However, there are subtle differences in how interrogative sentences and negation are presented.

In the pidgin, the interrogative voice is expressed by using an interrogative pronoun (how, why etc.) at the beginning of sentences or a questioning tone because the pidgin lacks the initial question word 'do'. For example, the English translation of yu hia massa is 'Do you hear, master?' In that case, 'do' has no matching word in the pidgin. Instead, the interrogative voice is expressed by an interrogative tone.

The expression of a statement's negation has the word bail put at the initial place of a sentence. For instance, bail wi want pata means 'We do not want food'.

== Lexicon ==
Although Robert Dawson, a company agent of the Australian Agricultural Company, pointed out that Port Jackson Pidgin English is a jargon (also called a 'pre-pidgin') with a mixed lexicon and only basic grammar, but it exhibits great morphological stability. Lexical items borrowed from English are combined with other items from Aboriginal languages to form a pidgin compound. For example, blakjin, literally consisting of black and gin, means 'Aboriginal woman'. Replicate morphemes are used to emphasise a word’s meaning. For instance, debildebil means 'great devil'. Interrogatives and quantifiers are also borrowed from English. In the pidgin, plenti, which can be retrieved from the English word "plenty", means "many". Wen is an interrogative word that means 'when'. Interestingly, Port Jackson Pidgin English has borrowed considerably from English verbs and lexicon but only a small number from Aboriginal languages.

== Significance ==
Port Jackson Pidgin English was the main means of communication between the settlers and the Aboriginal people in early colonial times. It provided a channel for intercultural communication. It is also important in terms of linguistics because it formed a basis for the development of Australian Kriol.

== Bibliography ==
- Hall, Robert A. Jr. (July 1945). "Notes on Australian Pidgin English". Language. 19 (3). Language, Vol. 19, No. 3: 263–267. doi:10.2307/409833. JSTOR 409833.
- McGregor, W. B. (2004). The Languages of the Kimberley, Western Australia. London, New York: Taylor & Francis. pp. 62–64.
- Mühlhäusler, P. (1991). "Overview of the pidgin and creole languages of Australia". In S. Romaine (ed.). Language in Australia. Cambridge: Cambridge University Press. pp. 159–173.
- Mühlhäusler, P.; McGregor, W. B. (1996). "Post-contact languages of Western Australia". In S. A. Wurm; P. Mühlhäusler; D. T. Tryon (eds.). Atlas of Languages of Intercultural Communication in the Pacific, Asia, and the Americas. Berlin: Mouton de Gruyter.
- Sandefur, J.; Sandefur, J. (1980). "Pidgin and Creole in the Kimberleys, Western Australia". Australian Institute of Aboriginal Studies Newsletter. 14: 31–37.
- Simpson, J. (2000). "Camels as pidgin-carriers: Afghan cameleers as a vector for the spread of features of Australian Aboriginal Pidgins and Creoles". In J. Siegel (ed.). Processes of Language Contact: Studies from Australia and the South Pacific. Saint Laurent, Quebec: Fides. pp. 195–244.
