= Chinese Pidgin English =

Type of contact language

- Chinese Coastal English, Pigeon English
- Region: China, Northern Australia and Nauru
- Era: 17th–19th centuries survives in Nauruan Pidgin English
- Language family: English pidgin
- Dialects: Nauruan Pidgin English

Language codes
- ISO 639-3: cpi
- Glottolog: chin1253
- Linguasphere: 52-ABB-da

Chinese Pidgin English (Cantonese: 廣東番話) (also called Chinese Coastal English, Pigeon English, or China Coast Pidgin) was a pidgin language lexically based on English, but influenced by a Chinese substratum. From the 17th to the 19th centuries, there was also Chinese Pidgin English spoken in Cantonese-speaking portions of China. Chinese Pidgin English is heavily influenced by a number of varieties of Chinese with variants arising among different provinces (for example in Shanghai and Ningbo).

== History ==
The English language first arrived in China in the 1630s, when English traders arrived in South China. Chinese Pidgin English was spoken first in the areas of Macao and Guangzhou (City of Canton), later spreading north to Shanghai by the 1830s. "Yangjing Bang English" (Chinese: 洋涇浜英語; pinyin: Yáng jīng bāng yīngyǔ) derives from the name of a former creek in Shanghai near the Bund where local workers communicated with English-speaking foreigners in pidgin (broken English); Yangjing Bang has since been filled in and is now the eastern part of Yan'an Road, the main east–west artery of central Shanghai.

Historically, it was a modified form of English developed in the 17th century for use as a trade language or lingua franca between the English and the Chinese. Chinese Pidgin started in Guangzhou, China, after the English established their first trading port there in 1699. Pidgin English is a mutual linguistic project developed between Chinese and foreign traders. Specifically, it arose under the sociopolitical circumstances where the Qing empire only allowed limited contact between foreign English trade agents and Chinese "Hong" guild traders. Though Chinese Pidgin English only identifies English as its lexifier language, the prior contact of the Portuguese with Canton in 1557 established a prototypical jargon. This Chinese-Portuguese jargon eventually developed into pidgin English as the number English traders rose while Portuguese traders declined. The term "pidgin" itself is believed by some etymologists to be a mispronunciation of the English word "business" by the Chinese.

Chinese Pidgin English began to decline in the late 19th century. Multiple reasons caused its decline. One reason is the common association of Chinese Pidgin English to the low social status of Chinese servants in comparison to their English-speaking masters. After the Second Opium War, the influx of English traders and resources to learn English encouraged the Chinese to acquire standard English. This process was further catalyzed by cosmopolitanism and concurrently English-Chinese bilingualism in Hong Kong, and displacement of the original community after World War II. Concurrently, the introduction of standard English education in the country's education system further discouraged the acquisition of Chinese Pidgin English.

Chinese Pidgin English spread to regions beyond the Chinese Coast. Many attestations of the language being spoken come from writings of Western travelers in China. Among these are scattered reports of the pidgin being spoken farther inland, such as in Chungking (Chongqing) and Hankow (Hankou), and farther north, in Kyong Song (Seoul) and even Vladivostok. Chinese Pidgin English was also taken beyond Asia: the large numbers of speakers in Nauru influenced the shaping of Nauruan Pidgin English, and there is evidence that it was also taken to Australia, where it altered due to the influence of Australian English and other pidgins. It is also reported to have been spoken in Singapore and Java.

Kim (2008) says that there is debate among linguists, including Baker, Mühlhäusler, and himself, about whether or not CPE was taken to California by 19th century immigrants. Many features present in California Chinese Pidgin English overlap with features of CPE, but also overlap with many other pidgins. Furthermore, some diagnostic features of CPE are missing or different from California Chinese Pidgin English. On the other hand, because many migrants came from the Canton province in China, where CPE was relatively well-known, it is likely that many migrants to the United States from China had knowledge of the pidgin. At the very least, it is clear that California Chinese Pidgin English should be treated as a distinct variety from CPE as spoken in Coastal China, because it has morphological and syntactic features not found in CPE.

== Phonology ==
Robert Hall (1944) gives the following phonemic inventory:

Consonants
Consonants	Labial	Dental	Alveolar	Postalveolar	Palatal	Velar	Glottal
Nasal	m		n			ŋ	
Plosive	p b		t d			k g	
Affricate				t̠͡ʃ d̠͡ʒ			
Fricative	f v	θ ð	s z	ʃ ʒ			h
Approximant	w		l	ɹ̠	j	(w)	

Vowels
Vowels	Front	Central	Back
Close	i		u
Near close	ɪ		ʊ
Close mid	e	ə	o
Open Mid	ɛ		ɔ
Near Open	æ		
Open	a		

Native speakers of English use this inventory. Because most lexical items in CPE are derived from English, native English speakers simply use the pronunciation familiar to them. For non-native English speakers, who were largely Cantonese speakers, [v, θ, ð, r, ʃ, ʒ] are not present, because these sounds are not present in Cantonese.

Hall also describes a few morphophonemic alterations. Many verbs ending in consonants may optionally add a vowel, as in [tek(i)] 'to take' and [slip(a)] 'to sleep'. Words ending in [r] and [l], and sometimes [d], optionally omit the final consonant, as in [litə(l)] 'little' and [mo(r)] 'more'. Certain stems also frequently lose their final consonant when before certain suffixes, as in [hwat] 'what?' ([hwasajd] 'where?', [hwatajm] 'when?', [hwafæʃan] 'how?'), [ðæt] 'that' ([ðæsajd] 'there'), [awt] 'out' ([awsajd] 'outside').

Baker and Mühlhäusler point out that Hall's data was taken entirely from native speakers of English, several decades after CPE was widely used. For this reason, they are skeptical of the data presented. Nonetheless, their own presentation of phonology in CPE is largely the same as Hall's. They state that [s] and [ʃ] were not phonemically contrastive for Cantonese speakers. Words ending in [f] in English often had an added [o] as in thiefo. Aside from these additions, Baker and Mühlhäusler have few revisions to make to the phonological claims Hall made.

== Morphology and syntax ==
Constructions in Chinese Pidgin English, both at the phrase level and sentence level, vary widely in taking English or Chinese structure. Generally speaking, pidgin languages have isolating morphology and so do not inflect nouns and verbs; CPE is no exception. Some morphological and syntactic phenomena, which frequently appear in linguistic literature, are listed below.

=== Pronouns ===
	Subject	Object	Independent Pronouns	Adnominal Possessives
1sg	my, I, me	my, me	my	my
2sg	you	you	you	you, your
3sg	he, she, it	he/him, she/her, it	he/him, she/her	he/his, she/her
1pl	we	us		
2pl	you	you	you	you, your
3pl	he, they	he, them	he	he

Prior to 1800, pronouns conformed largely to British and American English paradigms. Over time, my came to be the only first person singular pronoun in CPE, replacing both I and me. He was used for subject and non-subject referents alike (Baker and Mühlhäusler 1990: 104). Plural pronouns were expressed as in English by native English speakers; there is too little data from native Cantonese speakers to determine if they pluralized pronouns.

=== Topic–comment ===
In CPE, once a noun has been explicitly stated, it does not need to be stated again in following sentences where that item would normally be found. This means that in a given sentence, the subject or object may be omitted. In the example below, "very poor people" is the subject for the following clauses, although they do not explicitly state it.

- "This have very poor place and very poor people: no got cloaths, no got rice, no got hog, no got nothing; only yam, little fish, and cocoa-nut; no got nothing make trade, very little make eat."

The omitted noun may also be loosely related to the predicate, rather than a subject or object. In the sentence below, meaning "He won't sell at that price", the omitted "that pricee" is neither a subject nor an object.

- "[that pricee] he no sellum"

=== Copula ===
A word derived from English have was the usual copula in CPE until 1830. It usually appears as hab or hap. Belong is also used. After 1830 it became most common to omit the copula entirely.

- "Chinese man very great rogue truly, but have fashion, no can help."

("Chinese men are real rogues but that's how it is, can't help it.")

=== Piece/piecee ===
This lexical item seems to have been an influence of Cantonese grammar on CPE. Cantonese uses classifiers on nouns described by a number or demonstrative. The word piecee is used where Cantonese would expect a classifier. Chop is another classifier, used only in demonstrative constructions. Places where Cantonese does not use a classifier, as with the words for "year" and "dollar", likewise do not have a classifier in CPE.

- "You wantchee catchee one piecee lawyer."
  - "You will have to engage a lawyer."
- "Thisee chop tea what name?"
  - "What is the name of this tea?"

== Lexicon ==
The majority of the words used in CPE are derived from English, with influences from Portuguese, Cantonese, Malay, and Hindi.

- catchee: fetch (English catch)
- fankuei: westerner (Cantonese 番鬼)
- Joss: God (Portuguese deus)
- pidgin: business (English)
- sabbee: to know (Portuguese saber)
- taipan: supercargo (Cantonese 大班)
- two muchee: extremely (English too much)

== Influence on English ==
Certain expressions from Chinese English Pidgin have made their way into colloquial English as calques. The following is a list of English expressions which may have been influenced by Chinese.

- long time no see

Similar to the Mandarin phrase hao jiu bu jian (好久不見; hǎo jiǔ bù jiàn; 'very long (time) not see') and the Cantonese phrase 好(very) 耐(long time) 冇(not) 見(see), meaning "haven't seen [you] in a long time", further meaning "we have not seen each other in a long time". The Oxford English Dictionary states that "long time no see" originated in the United States as "a jocular imitation of broken English."

- look-see

(看(look) 見(see)) This phrase is attributed to Chinese Pidgin English by the Oxford English dictionary.

- No this no that

No ____, no ____ predates the origin of Chinese Pidgin English, but is also a notable example of fabricated pidgin English: (沒(no) 票(ticket) 沒(no) 襯衣(shirt)) meaning "If you don't have a laundry receipt, I won't give you your shirts", said to be a fabricated pidgin English inaccurately attributed to the Chinese laundry proprietors. In 1886, a New York City bill cited this phrase in reference to Chinese-owned dry cleaning establishments. In 1921 a movie titled "No Tickee No Shirtee" further popularized the saying. Another famous use of this phrase is "No money, no talk" (冇(no) 錢(money) 冇(no) 得(chance) 傾(talk) (Cantonese)), which simply means "If you don't have the money, don't try to bargain with me".

== Sample text ==
Chinese Pidgin English	Interlinear gloss	English
He Talkee he to got muchee pidgin	3sg talk 3sg got too much pidgin.	He says he is very busy
You makee enquire he, can talkee you.	you 2sg make enquire he 3sg can talk 2sg	If you enquire of him, he will tell you
Me thinkey you one very good man, one man what know justice and law.	1sg think 2sg art very good man art man what know justice and law	I think you are a good man, one who knows justice and the law
He tinkee so my go singsong girlee night-time	3sg thing cong 1sg so singsong girl night-time	She thinks that I go to visit singsong girls at night

== See also ==
- Broken English
- Canton System
- Chinglish
- Engrish
- Substratum (linguistics)
