= List of English-based pidgins =

Pidgin English is a non-specific name used to refer to any of the many pidgin languages derived from English. Pidgins that are spoken as first languages become creoles.

English-based pidgins that became stable contact languages, and which have some documentation, include the following:

- Aboriginal Pidgin English
- Native American Pidgin English
- Cameroonian Pidgin English
- Chinese Pidgin English
- Butler English (India)
- Ghanaian Pidgin English
- Hawaiian Pidgin English
- Japanese Bamboo English
- Japanese Pidgin English
- Korean Bamboo English
- Kru Pidgin English
- Liberian Interior Pidgin English
- Micronesian Pidgin English
- Nauru Pidgin English
- New Zealand Pidgin English
- Nigerian Pidgin
- Papua New Guinea Pidgin
- Papuan Pidgin English (distinct from Tok Pisin)
- Port Jackson Pidgin English (ancestral to Australian Kriol)
- Queensland Kanaka English
- Samoan Plantation Pidgin
- Solombala English
- Solomon Islands Pijin
- Spanglish/Ingléspañol (including dialects Llanito, Belizean Kitchen Spanish, ABC Islands Spanglish)
- Thai Pidgin English
- Tok Pisin
- West African Pidgin English (multiple varieties)
- Vanuatu Bislama
- Franglish

== See also ==
- English-based creoles
- Macaronic languages
- Rally English
- World Englishes
