= Pidgin =

Simplified language

A pidgin /ˈpɪdʒɪn/, or pidgin language, is a grammatically simplified form of contact language that develops between two or more groups of people that do not have a language in common: typically, its vocabulary and grammar are limited and often drawn from several languages. It is most commonly employed in situations such as trade, or where both groups speak languages different from the language of the country in which they reside (but where there is no common language between the groups).

Fundamentally, a pidgin is a simplified means of linguistic communication, as it is constructed impromptu, or by convention, between individuals or groups of people. A pidgin is not the native language of any singular speech community, but can be learned as a second language.

A pidgin may be built from words, sounds, or body language from a multitude of languages, as well as onomatopoeia. As the lexicon of any pidgin will be limited to core vocabulary, words with only a specific meaning in the lexifier language may acquire a completely new (or additional) meaning in the pidgin.

Pidgins have historically been considered a form of patois, unsophisticated, simplified versions of their lexifiers, and as such usually have low prestige with respect to other languages. However, not all simplified or "unsophisticated" forms of a language are pidgins. Each pidgin has its own norms of usage which must be learned for proficiency in the pidgin.

A pidgin differs from a creole, which is the first language of a speech community of native speakers that at one point arose from a pidgin. Unlike pidgins, creoles have fully developed vocabulary and patterned grammar. Most linguists believe that a creole develops through a process of nativization of a pidgin when children of speakers of an acquired pidgin learn it and use it as their native language.

== Etymology ==
Pidgin derives from a Chinese pronunciation of the English word business, and all attestations from the first half of the nineteenth century given in the third edition of the Oxford English Dictionary mean "business; an action, occupation, or affair" (the earliest being from 1807). The term pidgin English ('business English'), first attested in 1855, shows the term in transition to referring to language, and by the 1860s the term pidgin alone could refer to Pidgin English. The term came to be used in a more general linguistic sense to refer to any simplified language by the late 19th century.

A popular false etymology for pidgin is English pigeon, a bird sometimes used for carrying brief written messages, which were attached to the birds and naturally carried back to their home location, especially in times prior to modern telecommunications.

== Terminology ==
The word pidgin, formerly also spelled pigion, was first applied to Chinese Pidgin English, but was later generalized to refer to any pidgin. Pidgin may also be used as the specific name for local pidgins or creoles, in places where they are spoken. For example, the name of the creole language Tok Pisin derives from the English words talk pidgin. Its speakers usually refer to it simply as "pidgin" when speaking English. Likewise, Hawaiian Creole English is commonly referred to by its speakers as "Pidgin".

The term jargon has also been used to refer to pidgins, and is found in the names of some pidgins, such as Chinook Jargon. In this context, linguists today use jargon to denote a particularly rudimentary type of pidgin; however, this usage is rather rare, and the term jargon most often means the specialized vocabulary of some profession.

Pidgins may start out as or become trade languages, such as Tok Pisin. Trade languages can eventually evolve into fully developed languages in their own right, such as Swahili, distinct from the languages they were originally influenced by. Trade languages and pidgins can also influence an established language's vernacular, especially amongst people who are directly involved in a trade where that pidgin is commonly used, which can alternatively result in a regional dialect being developed.

== Common traits ==
Pidgins are usually less morphologically complex but more syntactically rigid than other languages, and usually have fewer morphosyntactic irregularities than other languages.

Characteristics shared by most pidgins:

- Typologically most closely resemble isolating languages
- Uncomplicated clausal structure (e.g., no embedded clauses, etc.)
- Reduction or elimination of syllable codas
- Reduction of consonant clusters or breaking them with epenthesis
- Elimination of aspiration or sound changes
- Monophthongization is common, employment of as few basic vowels as possible, such as [a, e, i, o, u]
- Lack of morphophonemic variation
- Lack of tones, such as those found in Niger-Congo, Austroasiatic and Sino-Tibetan language families and in various families of the indigenous languages of the Americas
- Lack of grammatical tense; use of separate words to indicate tense, usually preceding the verb
- Lack of conjugation, declension or agreement
- Lack of grammatical gender or number, commonly supplanted by reduplication to represent plurals and superlatives, and other parts of speech that represent the concept being increased and clear indication of the gender of animated objects.
- Lack of clear parts of speech or word categorization; common use and derivation of new vocabulary through conversion, e.g. nominalization, verbification, adjectivization etc.

== Development ==
The initial development of a pidgin usually requires:

- prolonged, regular contact between the different language communities
- a need to communicate between them
- an absence of (or absence of widespread proficiency in) a widespread, accessible interlanguage

Keith Whinnom (in Hymes (1971)) suggests that pidgins need three languages to form, with one (the superstrate) being clearly dominant over the others.

Linguists sometimes posit that pidgins can become creole languages when a generation of children learn a pidgin as their first language, a process that regularizes speaker-dependent variation in grammar. Creoles can then replace the existing mix of languages to become the native language of a community (such as the Chavacano language in the Philippines, Krio in Sierra Leone, and Tok Pisin in Papua New Guinea). However, not all pidgins become creole languages; a pidgin may die out before this phase would occur (e.g. the Mediterranean Lingua Franca).

Other scholars, such as Salikoko Mufwene, argue that pidgins and creoles arise independently under different circumstances, and that a pidgin need not always precede a creole nor a creole evolve from a pidgin. Pidgins, according to Mufwene, emerged among trade colonies among "users who preserved their native vernaculars for their day-to-day interactions". Creoles, meanwhile, developed in settlement colonies in which speakers of a European language, often indentured servants whose language would be far from the standard in the first place, interacted extensively with non-European slaves, absorbing certain words and features from the slaves' non-European native languages, resulting in a heavily basilectalized version of the original language. These servants and slaves would come to use the creole as an everyday vernacular, rather than merely in situations in which contact with a speaker of the superstrate was necessary.

== List of notable pidgins ==
Many of these languages are commonly referred to by their speakers as "Pidgin".

- Algonquian–Basque pidgin
- Arafundi-Enga Pidgin
- Bamboo English
- Barikanchi Pidgin
- Basque–Icelandic pidgin
- Bimbashi Arabic
- Bislama (creolized)
- Bombay Hindi
- Borgarmålet
- Bozal Spanish
- Broken Oghibbeway
- Broken Slavey and Loucheux Jargon
- Broome Pearling Lugger Pidgin
- Camtho
- Cameroonian Pidgin English (creolized)
- Cocoliche
- Chinese Pidgin English
- Chinook Jargon
- Duvle-Wano Pidgin
- Eskimo Trade Jargon
- Ewondo Populaire
- Fanagalo (Pidgin Zulu)
- Français Tirailleur
- Ghanaian Pidgin
- Haflong Hindi
- International Sign
- Inuktitut-English Pidgin
- Kiautschou Pidgin German
- KiKAR (Swahili pidgin)
- Kwoma-Manambu Pidgin
- Kyakhta Russian–Chinese Pidgin
- Kyowa-go and Xieheyu
- Labrador Inuit Pidgin French
- Madras Bashai
- Maridi Arabic
- Maritime Polynesian Pidgin
- Mediterranean Lingua Franca (Sabir)
- Mekeo pidgins
- Mobilian Jargon
- Namibian Black German
- Ndyuka-Tiriyó Pidgin
- Nefamese
- Nigerian Pidgin (creolized)
- Nootka Jargon
- Pidgin Delaware
- Pidgin Hawaiian
- Pidgin Iha
- Pidgin Ngarluma
- Pidgin Onin
- Pidgin Wolof
- Pijin (creolized)
- Roquetas Pidgin Spanish
- Russenorsk
- Settler Swahili
- Simplified English
- Surzhyk
- Sranan Tongo
- Taimyr Pidgin Russian
- Tây Bồi Pidgin French
- Tinglish
- Te Parau Tinito
- Tok Pisin (creolized)
- Turku language
- West Greenlandic Pidgin
- Yokohama Pidgin Japanese

== See also ==
- Bilingual pun – Pun that utilizes words or phrases from multiple languages
- Camfranglais (Cameroon) – Mixed language of Cameroon
- Creole language – Stable natural languages that have developed from a pidgin
- Engrish – Slang term for broken English
- Hiri Motu – Austronesian language of Papua New Guinea
- International auxiliary language – Constructed language meant to facilitate communication
- Lingua franca – Concept in linguistics
- Macaronic language – Text using a mixture of languages
- Mixed language – Language that arises amongst a bilingual group
- Spanglish – Hybrid language of Spanish and English
- Trading zones (metaphor) – Metaphor applied to collaborations in science
- Universal language – Hypothetical language
