= Language game =

Obfuscation of language for fun and secrecy

A language game (also called a cant, 'secret language', ludling, or 'argot') is a system of manipulating spoken words to render them incomprehensible to an untrained listener. Language games are used primarily by groups attempting to conceal their conversations from others. Some common examples are Pig Latin; the Gibberish family, prevalent in the United States and Sweden; and Verlan, spoken in France.

A common difficulty with language games is that they are usually passed down orally; while written translations can be made, they are often imperfect, and thus spelling can vary widely. Some factions argue that words in these spoken tongues should simply be written the way they are pronounced, while others insist that the purity of language demands that the transformation remain visible when the words are imparted to paper.

== Use ==
Some language games such as Pig Latin are so widely known that privacy is virtually impossible, as most people have a passable understanding of how it works and the words can sound very similar to their English counterpart. Although language games are not usually used in everyday conversation, some words from language games have made their way into normal speech, such as ixnay in English (from Pig Latin), and loufoque in French (derived from fou according to the rules of Louchébem)

== Classification ==
One way in which language games could be organized is by host language. For example, Pig Latin, Ubbi Dubbi, and Tutnese could all be in the "English" category, and Jeringonza could be in the "Spanish" (or "Portuguese" or "Italian") category.

An alternate method of classifying language games is by their method. For example, Ubbi Dubbi, Bicycle, and Allspråket all work by inserting a code syllable before the vowel in each syllable. Therefore, these could be classified in the Gibberish family. Also, Double Talk, Língua do Pê, Jeringonza, and B-Sprache all work by adding a consonant after the vowel in each syllable, and then repeating the vowel. Thus, these could be classified in the Double Talk family. Another common type of language game is the spoonerism, in which the onsets of two words are exchanged. Using a standard word for each transformation gives another type, for example, the Finnish "kontinkieli", where kontti is added after each word, and spoonerism applied (kondäntti koonerismspontti koppliedäntti).

== List of common language games ==
=== In English ===
Common language games
Host Language	Name	Basic Rules	Notes
English (etc.)	Pig Latin	Move the onset of the first syllable to the end of each word, and add "ay" /eɪ/.	When a word starts with a vowel (and thus there is no onset), you simply add "ay," "way," "yay," or "hay" (depending on the variant) at the end. For example: Hello, how are you? becomes Ellohay, owhay are-ay ouyay? In some variants, vowels are moved to the end, "ay" is added, and the speaker will attempt to pronounce it.
English (etc.)	Aigy Paigy (or Haigy Paigy, etc.)	Insert "aig" /ˈeɪɡ/ before the rime of each syllable.	E.g., Hello, how are you? becomes Haigellaigo, haigow aigare yaigou?
English (etc.)	Alfa Balfa (or Alpha Balpha)	In each syllable of a word, insert "alf" after the first consonant and/or before the first vowel of the syllable. Thus each syllable becomes two syllables, the first rhyming with "pal" and the second beginning with the "f" in "alf."	E.g., Hello, how are you? becomes Halfellalfo, halfow alfare yalfou?
English (etc.)	Ubbi Dubbi (or Obby Dobby)	Insert "ob" /ˈɒb/ or "ub" /ˈʌb/ before the rime of each syllable.	Also called Pig Greek; part of the Gibberish family.
English	Polysyllabic ollysyllabic	Multiple repetitions of polysyllabic words deleting initial sounds successively and making appropriate vowel changes:	E.g., Everybody, verybody, errybody, wrybody, whybody, body, oddie, die, why. and Catastrophe, atastrophy, tastrophy, astrophy, strophee, trophy, rophy, ophee, fee, he, ee.
English	Cockney rhyming slang	Canonical rhyming word pairs; speakers often drop the second word of common pairs.	wife → trouble (and strife); stairs → apples (and pears)
English	Gibberish, Geta, Op, etc.	Many variations exist. In one: after the first consonant in each syllable, insert "itherg" for words of 1 to 3 letters, "itug" for words of 4 to 6 letters, or "idig" for longer words. In another: a less restrictive variation (sometimes called Geta), this simple rule exists: place the sound "idig" /ɪdɪɡ/ right before the vowel sound in every syllable. So "This is Geta" becomes "Thidigís idigís Gidigétigida" (with accent marks shown here on stressed syllables).	"Gibberish" refers to any one of several similar language games that involves inserting additional sounds into each syllable of a word.
English	Inflationary English	Any time a number is present within a word, inflate its value by one.	Anyone up for tennis? becomes Anytwo up five elevennis? Originally part of a comedy sketch by Victor Borge.
English	-izzle	Insert "-izzle" after a word's last pre-vowel consonant while discarding the remaining letters.	Merry Christmas → Mizzle Christmizzle
English	Back slang	Formed by speaking words backwards; where unnecessary, anagrams may be employed to aid pronunciation.	Used by traders to conceal shop talk from customers.
English	Spoonerism	Formed by swapping prominent sounds, usually the first letters, of close words.	For example, The pig is sick becomes The sig is pick; She nicked my pose becomes She picked my nose; Light a fire becomes Fight a liar
English	Tutnese	Spell out words using a lexicon of names for consonants, and special rules for double letters.	How are you? → Hashowack arure yuckou?
English	Uasi	The primary rule is the "vowel shift," where each vowel is shifted over one place to the right (e.g., "a" becomes "e"). Other rules exist, such as tongue clicks to signify verb tenses.	I went to the store → O guL ta osi sturi

=== In other languages ===
Common language games
Host Language	Name	Basic Rules	Notes
Afrikaans	Emmer-taal	Suffix "-mer" to the end of each word. Longer words that consist of joined words are often broken into two or more words with the "-mer" sound inserted in the middle and at the end.	Example: Daar onder in die vlei stap 'n mannetjie → Damer ommer immer diemer vleimer stammer immer mammer-tjiemmer.
Afrikaans	P-taal	Insert [əp] before the first vowel of each syllable. Syllables with stacked consonants may follow additional rules.	Writing generally depicts the sounds instead the original letters. Daar onder in die vlei stap 'n mannetjie → Depaar epondeper epen depie vlepei stepap epe mepannepekepie.
Albanian	Të folurit me f ('Speaking with F')	All vowels are doubled, and "f" is placed between them.	Spoken mostly by kids and teenagers among friends. Dialectal patterns are observed in some areas. Example: Ç'do bëjmë tani? ('What are we going to do now?' in the Tosk dialect) becomes Çdofo bëfëjmëfë tafanifi?
Amharic	Yäwof q'uanq'ua ('bird language') and Yägra quanqua ('language of the left'). There is also another form with more complex rules.	Yäwof q'uanq'ua: Duplicate each syllable, replacing the initial consonant with "z" in the duplicate. Yägra quanqua: move the last syllable to the front of the word.	Yäwof q'uanq'ua: säbbärä 'he broke' becomes säzäbbäzäräzä Yägra quanqua: mätt'a 'he came' → t'ämma
Arabic	one iteration called Misf	"-rb-" language game found in several dialects involves the insertion of the consonants "-rb-" at various parts within the word, often on the stressed syllable.	balad becomes baarbalad and fiil becomes fiirbiil This cant was in general vogue during the 1930s and throughout the 1960s in Mecca.
Bengali		Insert "faado" at the end of each syllable. Additional rules may apply to note the end of a word.	Aami ('I' or 'me') → Aa-faado-Mi-faado spoken very fast.
Bulgarian	Pileshki	Insert "pi" before each syllable. Though simple, when spoken quickly, words become nearly incomprehensible. Often called "chicken language" because it mimics the sounds fledglings make. Pileshko means 'chicken' in Bulgarian.	куче becomes пикупиче
Burmese	Ban Zaga/Thor Zagar	Thor Zagar: Put Thor at the end of each word and change the consonant of the first and last word.	Example: achit → achor thit
Cantonese	S-language	Repeat each syllable changing the initial consonant to /s/	Used by children and teenagers to avoid being understood by adults.
Cebuano	Kinabayo ('horse language')	Mimics the sound of a horse's gallop. Replace every vowel by (the vowel)+'g'+(the vowel)+'d'+(the vowel).	ni-a ang salap becomes Agadanigidi-agada agadang sagadalagadapigidi
Danish	P-language	All vowels are doubled, with "p" inserted between the doubled vowels.	Rules are identical to Swedish P-language
Danish	Røversprog	All consonants are doubled, with an "o" inserted between the doubled consonants.	Rules are identical to Icelandic Goggamál
Dutch		Reversed elements and words.	A mercantile code
Dutch	P-taal	Insert [əp] before the first vowel of each syllable. Syllables with stacked consonants may follow additional rules.	Writing generally depicts the sounds instead the original letters. Daar op straat staat een mannetje → Depaar epop strepaat stepaat epen mepannepetjepe.
Dutch	Okki-taal	Add "-okki" to any consonant, and replace vowels with a number corresponding to the order of vowels in the alphabet (a → 1, e → 2, etc.)	A children's game. For example: example → 2 xokki 1 mokki pokki lokki 2
Dutch	Panovese Kal	Mixing characters in a particular way.	Used in Kortessen, Limburg, ca. 1900. For example: Onze vader die in de hemelen zijt → Onze zeder die in de vamelen hijt
Esperanto	Esperant'	Replace the accusative with the preposition je, and the final -o of nouns with an apostrophe, all while keeping to the letter of official grammar if not actual usage.	Oni ĉiam obeu la Fundamenton becomes Ĉiamu onia obe' je l' Fundament'
Estonian	Pii-keel (Pi-Language)	Insert the syllable pi after the (first) syllable or into a long syllable's nucleus between the vowels.	For example: mi-na o-len siin 'I am here' becomes mi-pi-na o-pi-len si-pi-in
Estonian	Ö-keel (Ö-Language or vowel language)	Replace every vowel with the vowel "ö" or "õ", "ä", "ü". In a more extreme variety, any other vowel or 2 vowels in a row (instead only "ö" can be used "ö" and "ä" together as "öä") can also be used.	For example: Mis sa teed? 'What are you doing?' becomes Mös sö tööd?
Finnish	Sananmuunnos	Spoonerism: swap first morae of words	Apply vowel harmony according to the initial syllable, and repair "broken diphthongs" into permitted diphthongs
Finnish	Kontinkieli	Add word "kontti" after each word and apply the same conversion as in sananmuunnos	Finnish counterpart of Pig Latin. This game is also called siansaksa ('Pig German'), which is a common expression for unintelligible gibberish.
Finnish	A-Kieli (A-language)	Replace every vowel with the vowel "a".	For example: Mitä sä teet becomes Mata sa taat
French	Louchébem	Move the initial consonant to the end and add '-em' (the suffix may be different in other varieties). Prepend 'l' ('L') to the base word.	Initially a Parisian and Lyonnaise butchers' cant. For example: parler → larlepem
French	Verlan	Inverted syllables, often followed by truncation and other adjustments.	Examples: racaille [ʀaˈkaj] → caillera [kajˈʀa]; noir [nwaʀ] → renoi [ʀəˈnwa]; arabe [aˈʀab] → beur [bəʀ]; femme [fam] → meuf [məf]
French	Jargon	Replace each vowel by "adaga" for A, "edegue" for E, "odogo" for O, etc.	
French	Javanais	Insert "av" between consonants and vowels.	
French	Loght el V	After every vowel, insert "v", then the vowel.	An Egyptian "dialect" of Javanais, used by children and teenagers in French-speaking schools in Cairo to avoid being understood by adults (especially teachers).
French	Parler en me	Double each vowel and insert [m] between the doubled vowels.	A cryptolect used formerly by Judeo-Gascon-speaking Jewish merchants in Bordeaux.
German		'Lav' inserted after some vowel sounds.	
German	B-Language	Reduplicate each vowel or diphthong with a leading "b."	Deutsche Sprache → Deubeutschebe Sprabachebe
German	Löffelsprache (spoon language)	Each (spoken) vowel or diphthong is reduplicated with a leading "lef," "lew," or "lev."	Hallo! Wie geht es dir? → Halewallolewo! Wielewie geleweht elewes dilewir? Also possible with other languages: Don't try to take me to New York! → Dolevon't trylevy tolevo tailevaik meleve tolevo Newlevew/Newlevoo Yolevork!
Greek	Podaná	Similar to the Spanish vesre.	Γκόμενα → Μεναγκό; Φραγκα → Γκαφρα
Greek	Korakistika	Insert "k" and the vowel(s) of the original syllable after each syllable	Kalimera → Kaka liki meke raka
Greek	Splantziana	Move the vowels of each word to before the consonants.	Examples: στόμα → όσταμ άριστα → άϊραστ Also used in Crete and Khania
Hakka	Yuantang dialect	Each consonant and vowel is replaced by a Hakka word. Similar to fanqie spellings.	食饭 [sit fan] → 手习花散 [siu jit fa san] → [s_{(iu)} _{(j)}it f_{(a)} _{(s)}an]
Hebrew	Bet-Language	Identical to the German B-Language described above.	A song that won the Eurovision Song Contest was titled "A-Ba-Ni-Bi", based on this game.
Hungarian	Madárnyelv (birds' language)	Repeat each vowel and add 'v'	A variety of Gibberish. For example, látok 'I see' → lávátovok
Hungarian	Madárnyelv (birds' language)	Repeat each vowel and add 'rg'	For example: látok 'I see' → lárgátorgok
Hungarian	Kongarian	Add 'ko' before each syllable	For example: látok 'I see' → kolákotok
Hungarian	Verzin	Syllable order is inverted.	Hungarian version of verlan. For example: hátra 'backwards' → rahát
Indonesian	Bahasa G	Repeat each vowel and add G.	For example, Belajar itu susah becomes begelagajagar igitugu sugusagah.
Indonesian	Bahasa Oke	Take only the first syllable of a word and replace the vowel with "oke," "oka," or "oki."	For example, Buku becomes Bokeku, Bokaku, or Bokiku.
Italian	Latino Maccheronico	see below: Romance languages, Macaronic Latin	
Italian	Alfabeto farfallino	Similar to the Albanian Të folurit me f . Add "Fx" after all syllables, where x is the vowel in the corresponding syllable of the real word.	For example, ciao → ciafaofo (cia-FA-o-FO); By applying the same "rule" to the English word hello, we would obtain: he-FE-llo-FO
Italian	Riocontra	Inverted syllables, often followed by truncation and other adjustments.	Examples: figo ['figo] → gofi ['gofi]; frate ['frate] → tefra ['tefra]; sbirro ['zbiro] → rosbi ['rozbi]; zio ['tsio] → ozi ['otsi]
Icelandic	Goggamál	Consonants are changed to "<consonant> o <consonant>." The "o" is pronounced as in "hot."	Examples: Icelandic: Hvernig hefur þú það? → Hohvoverornonigog hohefofuror þoþú þoþaðoð? English: How are you doing? → Hohowow arore yoyou dodoinongog?
Icelandic	Pémál	A "p" is added to the end of each syllable, followed by the vowel in the corresponding syllable, except in final position if the word ends on a consonant.	Example: Eldgamla Ísafold → Epeldgapamlapa Ípísapafopold
Japanese	Babigo	Same as Double Talk or Spanish Idioma F: put "b" plus vowel between syllables	Example: watashi-wa becomes waba taba shibi waba
Japanese	Sakasa kotoba	Reverse the morae of each word.	Examples: sakura becomes rakusa; iou becomes uoi
Khmer	Pheasa Krolors (ភាសាក្រលាស់ 'Switching-tones language')	Switch the vowels of the first and last syllables in a word or phrase	Invented by teenagers for mostly affecting a meaning from a normal word or phrase to an obscene one. Example: pheasa 'language' becomes phasea
Korean	Gwisin Mal (귀신말 'ghost language') / Dokkaebi Mal (도깨비말 'Ogre language')	Put "s plus vowel" or "b plus vowel" between syllables.	Examples: Ya! Neo! Jal ga (야! 너! 잘 가 'Hey! You! Good bye') becomes Yasa! Neoseo! Jasal gasa (야사! 너서! 자살 가사); Neo neomu yeppeo (너 너무 예뻐 'you are so pretty') becomes Neoseo neoseomusu yeseppeoseo (너서 너서무수 예세뻐서)
Latvian	Pupiņvaloda (bean language)	Repeat every vowel in the word (excluding diphthongs), inserting a "p" before the repeated vowel. For example, "a" would be "apa", "e" becomes "epe" and so forth. In diphthongs, this is only done with the first vowel.	E.g., valoda becomes vapalopodapa, while Daugava becomes Dapaugapavapa
Luo	Dhochi	In two-syllable words, the syllables exchange positions (a); in words of three syllables the second and third syllable exchange positions (b); and in one-syllable words the first and last consonants exchange places (c).	(a) ŋgɛgɛ -> gɛŋgɛ ‘tilapia’ (b) apwɔyɔ -> ayɔpwɔ ‘hare’ (c) čiɛk -> kiɛč ‘short’
Macedonian	Папагалски / Parrotish	Put "P" (п) after every vowel and repeat the vowel again.	Example: Ова е Википедиjа becomes Оповапа епе Випикипипедипијапа
Malay	Bahasa F	After each syllable, add "f" and repeat last vowel.	Kau nak pergi mana tu, Linda? → Kaufau nakfak perfergifi mafanafa tufu Linfindafa? Invented in the early 1990s in Malaysian primary schools, it was mostly used by girls for gossiping. In 1998, the Malay romantic comedy film Puteri Impian 2 pushed this language into the limelight of Malaysian popular culture.
Malay	Ke-an	Add the circumfix "ke-...-an" to every word, rendering them all nouns or noun-like. Words with affixes are stripped to their root words first.	Used for amusement rather than to encrypt, as results are easily understood and some changes drastically affect meaning. Kenapa kau selalu buat begitu? Kau tidak rasa malukah? → Kekenapaan kekauan keselaluan kebuatan kebegituan? Kekauan ketidakan kerasaan kemaluan? (malu: shame; kemaluan: private parts)
Malay	"Half lang"	The last syllable, excluding its first consonant, is dropped from a 2- or 3-syllable word; similarly, the last two syllables are dropped from a 4- or 5-syllable word. Variation: Add an "s" to each "halved" word as well.	susu besar → sus bes; gunung tinggi → gun ting; Kenapa kau selalu buat begitu? → Kenaps kau selals buat begits?
Mandarin Chinese	Huizongyu or Qiekou	Split one syllable into two: the first syllable represents the onset of the original word, the second represents the final	Derives from the fanqie system (a traditional way of indicating the pronunciation of a Chinese character by using two other characters). Example: ni hao → nai li hai gao
Marathi	Cha-Bhasha	The first phoneme is replaced by "cha" and the dropped sound is added after the word. Variation: only nouns are encoded.	Dhungan dukhtay kaa? → Changandhu chakhtaydu chaak? Variation: Dhungan dukhtay kaa? → Changandhu dukhtay kaa?
Norwegian	Røverspråk	Reduplicate each consonant with an "o" in the middle.	Norwegian example: Slik snakker man røverspråk på norsk. → Soslolikok sosnonakokkokeror momanon rorøvoverorsospoproråkok popå nonororsoskok. English example: This is how you speak røverspråk in Norwegian. → Tothohisos isos hohowow you sospopeakok rorøvoverorsospoproråkok inon nonororwowegogianon.
Oromo	Afan Sinbira ('bird language')	Two basic kinds: syllable insertion and final syllable fronting	Syllable insertion, with either "s" or "g" and an echo vowel: dirre 'field' -> disirrese Syllable fronting, with vowel lengthening: dirre 'field' → reedi
Persian	Zargari	In each syllable, reduplicate the vowel with the sound [z] between the copies of the vowel	ؑExamples: man → mazan من ← مزن 'I' az → azaz از ← ازز 'from/of' tū → tuzū تو← تزو 'you (singular)'
Portuguese	Sima		
Portuguese	Língua do Pê	After each syllable, add "p" plus the preceding vowel (and a few consonants - like m, n, r, s...)	Olá, tudo bem com você? → Opôlapa, tupudopô bempem compom vopocêpe?
Portuguese	Língua do "i"	Each vowel is changed to "i."	Olá, tudo bem? → Ili, tidi bim?
Romance languages	Macaronic Latin	Romance vocabulary is given Latinate endings.	"de Don Quijote de la Mancha" → "Domini Quijoti Manchegui"
Romanian	păsărească ('birds' language')	In each syllable, reduplicate the vowel, adding "p" between the two vowels.	mașină → mapașipinăpă
Romanian	greaca vacească ('cow Greek')	After each word, add 'os'	istorie → istorieos
Russian	Kirpichny yazyk (Кирпичный язык) or Solyony yazyk (Солёный язык) ('Brick/Salty language')	After the vowel of each syllable add "k" or "s" and repeat the vowel	durak (дурак) → dukurakak (дукуракак) or dusurasak (дусурасак)
Bosnian-Croatian-Serbian	Šatrovački	Various styles of reordering syllables.	zdravo becomes vozdra
Serbian	Utrovački	Words are formed using: "u-" + last part + "-za-" + first part + "-nje".	zdravo becomes uvozazdranje
Serbian	Pig-Italian	"-are" is appended to words or their roots.	krava pase travu becomes kravare pasare travare
Slovene	papajščina	After each vowel insert "p" followed by the same vowel; popular among young children.	zdravo becomes zdrapavopo. Identical to Spanish jeringonza described below.
Somali	Af Jinni (Djinni language)	After the vowel of each syllable add a consonant of your choice and repeat the vowel.	Example: Ahlan 'Hallo' has two syllables, so when used with "b", it becomes abahlaban (aBAh-laBAn). Applied to an English word: enjoying → eBEnjoBOyiBIng, eben-jobo-yibing.
Spanish	Idioma F	Each vowel is reduplicated with an inserted "f."	A variant of Jeringonza. No sé si sabes hablar con la efe → Nofo sefe sifi safabefes hafablafar cofon lafa efe
Spanish	Mexico City slang	Substitute a word for another that begins the same.	Unas caguamas bien heladas → unas Kawasakis bien elásticas
Spanish		Add a "ti" before every original syllable.	perro → tipetirro
Spanish	Jeringonza (called "Jeringozo" en Argentina)	Each vowel is reduplicated with an inserted "p."	No sabe nada → Nopo sapabepe napadapa
Spanish	Rosarigasino (a.k.a. Gasó, from Rosario, a city in Argentina)	Add "-gas-" after stressed vowel and repeat the vowel.	Don Quijote de la Mancha → Don Quijogasote de la Magasancha
Spanish	Vesre	Syllable order is inverted.	muchacho → chochamu Used in Argentina, Uruguay, and Peru
Swedish	Allspråket	Insert "-all-" after the first consonant in each word.	In Swedish: Hur är läget? → Hallur ärall lalläget? In English: How are you doing? → Hallow aralle yallou dalloing?
Swedish	Fikonspråket	Each word (or each syllable) is split into two halves. The cant word is formed as "fi-" + second-half + first-half + "-kon." (fikon is Swedish for fig.)	In Swedish: Hur är läget? → Fir hukon fir äkon figet läkon? In English: How are you doing? → Fiw hokon fir(e) akon fio(u) ykon fiing dokon?
Swedish	I-sprikit	All vowels are changed to "i."	Can I go to the mall? → Cin I gi ti thi mill?
Swedish	"P-language"	All vowels are doubled, and a "p" is inserted between the doubled vowels.	
Swedish	Pip-svenska	An "e-" is prefixed to words starting with a consonant, and a "t-" is prefixed to words starting with a vowel. In addition, in every other word the vowels are doubled and an "-s" is inserted between them; in the remaining words every vowel is doubled and an "l" inserted.	Swedish: Jag är från Sverige → Ejasag tälär efråsån Esveleriligele. English: I am from Sweden → Tisi talam efrosom Esweledelen.
Swedish	Rövarspråket	Each consonant is changed to "<consonant> o <consonant>." The "o" is pronounced as in "hot".	Swedish: Hur är läget? → Hohuror äror lolägogetot? English: How are you doing? → Hohowow arore yoyou dodoinongog?
Tagalog	Binaliktad ('Inverted')	Exchange the first and last syllables of any two-syllable word. In any longer word, prefix the last syllable to the first, and affix the first syllable after the second to last. Sometimes "s" is added to certain words for stylistic effect.	Examples: hindi 'no' becomes dehins (e and i are allophones in Philippine languages). The "-s" is added here as a stylistic feature. sigarilyo (from Spanish cigarillo) becomes yosi (last and first syllable, middle syllables omitted). katulong 'domestic helper' becomes lóngkatuts (last syllable prefixed, other syllables moved along. "-t" is suffixed as a means of differentiating this word from subsequent ones, and "-s" is added as a stylistic feature. This treatment is also applicable to English words like father and mother, which become erpats and ermats.
Turkish	Kuş dili ('Bird language')	Each vowel is reduplicated with a separating "g."	Ben okula gidiyorum 'I am going to school' becomes Begen ogokugulaga gigidigiyogorugum
Urdu	Fay ki Boli (فے کی بولی)	Insert "fay" (ف - Urdu letter corresponding to the English 'F') in the middle of each syllable (usually before the vowel, splitting the syllable into two). In some monosyllabic words, "yay" (Urdu letter for 'Y') is added after fay and in reverse before completing the rest of the half.	Spoken and understood widely in Karachi, Pakistan, among native Urdu speakers. Fay can be replaced by most other consonants to form another variety. Examples: ؑ tum kesi ho? → tufum kifesifi hufo? تم کیسی ہو؟ ← تفم کفیسفی ہفو؟ 'How are you? (feminine addressee)' kia → kifay-yifa کیا ← کفے یفا 'what'
Urdu	Pay ki Boli	Insert "pay" and "noon" (Urdu letters corresponding to "P" and "N" respectively in English) in the middle of each syllable (usually before the vowel, splitting the syllable into two, ending first half into pay and starting the next with noon) in each word.	Not commonly known and very complex, even for those who know how it works, especially when spoken at fast speed, resulting in handy privacy.
Urdu	Zargari Urdu	Urdu also has its own Zargari variant, inspired by the Persian version. One variation includes prefixing the letter "zay" with sound "Z" at the start of each word, or substituting it for the word's first letter. This can be the basis of a game played with children, who are challenged to guess the original words and phrases.	
Vietnamese	Nói lái	Switch the tones, the order of two syllables in a word, or the initial consonant and rime of each syllable.	Example: bầy tôi 'all the king's subjects' → bồi tây 'French waiter' bí mật 'secret' → bật mí 'revealing secret' → bị mất 'to be gone'

Additionally, Auflinger described some types of speech disguise in some languages near the city of Madang in Papua New Guinea.

== See also ==
- Word game
- Word play
- Cant (language)
- Conversation games

== Additional literature ==
- Pstrusińska, Jadwiga. 2014. Secret languages of Afghanistan and their speakers. Cambridge Scholars Publishing.
