= Youth slang =

Linguistic patterns associated with young speakers

Youth slang (also youth language and youth communication) refers to ways of speaking or linguistic patterns and features that different groups of young people use or have used at different times, at different ages and under different communication conditions.

== Definition ==
According to Helmut Glück (2005), the term is not strictly defined. Heinrich Löffler describes youth language as a transitory special language (“age-specific language”), thus highlighting the temporal limitation of these language forms in a person's life. However, in Germanic and Western European linguistics today, youth language is hardly considered a special language anymore, but is largely defined as a complex variety of standard language or as the speech style of a (specific) group of young people. The distinction between youth-typical and youth-specific linguistic features and patterns is important. In current youth language research, features and patterns of orality, colloquial language, and group communication are generally considered typical of youth languages (see, e.g., Eva Neuland 2018). Exaggeration and intensification, humour, irony and playfulness, expressiveness and emotionality characterize youth language use. Youth language is a phenomenon found in many languages. This includes spoken languages as well as sign languages such as German Sign Language.

== Forms of youth language ==
Over time, a number of terms have emerged for different forms of youth language; these include: comic book German, school slang, interspersion of English into the parent language such as Denglisch (a mix of German and English), military slang, student slang, scene slang, drug slang, graffiti slang, hip-hop slang, and, somewhat erroneously, internet slang. These terms are not all exclusively limited to the speech patterns of young people. However, they also encompass their forms of expression although they primarily refer to specialized vocabulary, i.e., the vocabulary of young people. Youth language exhibits peculiarities and preferences in various linguistic levels, such as phonetics and graphematics, morphosyntax, as well as in stylistic and textual terms. In recent years, particularly in urban areas, ethnolectal elements from young people with a background of migration have been incorporated into youth language in many countries. This is evident in individual expressions and phrases, as well as in phonetics, but also in gestures.

== Characteristics of youth language ==
Above all, there is no single, unified youth language. Rather, it comprises forms of expression that develop within group communication and thus take on different forms under varying geographical, social, and historical conditions. The researchers' view that the function of youth language primarily serves to differentiate itself from the adult world (Glück 2005: "counterlanguage") and to solidify its speakers' identification with their respective group has since been expanded. Other functions of youth language include identity formation in the context of grappling with role and status ascriptions imposed by societal norms, its emotional and expressive function, and also its function of naming realities that exist within the context of young people's lives.

The vocabulary and certain stylistic devices (such as exaggeration, intensification, playfulness, irony, provocation, etc.) are cited in the literature as being particularly characteristic. The divergent vocabulary has prompted the creation of several dictionaries of youth language, which, however, also produce a stereotypical image of youth language that hardly reflects the reality of how young people speak. Special interjections such as "boah" and "ey" are also used. Most expressions, however, are very short-lived. For example, "knorke" was used in the past to express high approval; later, "astrein", "cool", "nice," or even "geil" emerged, often enriched with intensifying forms ("oberaffengeil"). For this reason, there are regular new editions of the dictionaries of youth language, or even entirely new collections, which are, however, viewed critically by linguists specializing in youth language.

Metaphors and figurative expressions are frequently used; for example, "long leg hair" becomes "natural wool socks." Youth slang is also often very provocative and offensive. Another characteristic of youth slang is the use of abbreviations. For example, "so einem" (something like that) becomes "so 'nem." Many words are borrowed from English, although the frequency of their use is usually exaggerated. An example of an Anglicism is the aforementioned "cool "—a word that has now become common in everyday German speech and can no longer be considered typical youth slang. Filler words (e.g., "und so"), interjections, and "hedges" (e.g., "irgendwie") occur regularly. In recent years, some young people have frequently used sentence abbreviations (e.g., "YOLO," which stands for " You only live once "). The syntax exhibits features of stylized speech, manifested in sentence fragments, ellipses, twisted sentences, and repetitions.

In some languages, youth slang includes moving syllables around to obfuscate words, such as French verlan, Spanish vesre, Italian riocontra, and Serbian šatrovački. English also has syllable-flipping word games, such as Pig Latin.

== Social selectivity of youth language ==
Youth languages are socially, ethnically, and gender-selective, albeit to varying degrees. The 1960s were apparently an era in which West Germany, according to statistically verifiable criteriaaccording to statistically verifiable criteria,, came closest to the ideal of an egalitarian society. At that time, it seems that “at least young people did not yet feel the need to talk about it or even to verbally distance themselves from the poor or uneducated”.

== “Youth Word of the Year” ==
In Germany and Austria, a "Youth Word of the Year" is chosen annually.

The “Youth Word of the Year” in Germany has been selected by a jury under the direction of the Langenscheidt publishing house since 2008; since 2020, the youth word can be chosen by anyone.

The “Youth Word of the Year” in Austria has been chosen by a jury since 2010.

== See also ==
- Glossary of 2020s slang
- German youth language
- Jargon
- Slang
- Youth culture

== Literature ==
- Androutsopoulos, Jannis (2000): Vom Mainstream-Radio bis zu den Skatermagazinen. Jugendmedien sprachwissenschaftlich betrachtet. Jugend und Medien. (Hg. vom JFF – Institut für Medienpädagogik in Forschung und Praxis). medien+erziehung 44/4. München, 229–235.
- Augenstein, Susanne (1998): Funktionen von Jugendsprache in Gesprächen Jugendlicher mit Erwachsenen. In: Androutsopoulos, Jannis: Jugendsprache. Langue des jeunes. Youth language. Linguistische und soziolinguistische Perspektiven. Frankfurt/Main (u. a.), 167–195.
- Hadumod Bußmann (Hrsg.): Lexikon der Sprachwissenschaft. 3. aktualisierte und erweiterte Auflage. Kröner, Stuttgart 2002, ISBN 3-520-45203-0 (Artikel: Jugendsprache).
- Helmut Glück (Hrsg.), unter Mitarbeit von Friederike Schmöe: Metzler Lexikon Sprache. 3., neu bearbeitete Auflage. Metzler, Stuttgart/Weimar 2005, ISBN 3-476-02056-8 (Stichwort: „Jugendsprache“).
- Helmut Henne: Jugend und ihre Sprache. Darstellung, Materialien, Kritik. de Gruyter, Berlin/New York 1986. ISBN 3-11-010967-0
- Theodor Lewandowski: Linguistisches Wörterbuch. 4., neu bearbeitete Aufl. Quelle & Meyer, Heidelberg 1985. ISBN 3-494-02050-7 Artikel: Jugendsprache.
- Eva Neuland: Jugendsprache in der Diskussion: Meinungen, Ergebnisse, Folgerungen. In: Rudolf Hoberg, Karin Eichhoff-Cyrus (Hrsg.): Die deutsche Sprache zur Jahrtausendwende. Sprachkultur oder Sprachverfall? Dudenverlag, Mannheim / Leipzig / Wien / Zürich 2000, ISBN 3-411-70601-5, S. 107–123.
- Eva Neuland: Jugendsprache. Eine Einführung. A. Francke Verlag (UTB für Wissenschaft), Tübingen 2008, ISBN 978-3-8252-2397-7; 2. überarbeitete und erweiterte Auflage, 2018, ISBN 978-3-8252-4924-3

== Forms of youth language ==
- PONS Wörterbuch der Jugendsprache 2016 – Das Original. 1. Aufl., PONS, Stuttgart 2015, ISBN 978-3-12-010139-0
