= Back slang =

Coded form of English speech

Back slang is a coded form of English in which the written word is spoken phonetically backwards.

== Usage ==
Back slang is thought to have originated in Victorian England. It was used mainly by market sellers, such as butchers and greengrocers, for private conversations behind their customers' backs and to pass off lower-quality goods to less-observant customers. The first published reference to it was in 1851, in Henry Mayhew's London Labour and the London Poor.

Some back slang has entered Standard English. For example, the term yob was originally back slang for "boy". Back slang is not restricted to words spoken phonemically backwards. English frequently makes use of diphthongs, which is an issue for back slang since diphthongs cannot be reversed. The resulting fix slightly alters the traditional back slang. An example is trousers and its diphthong, ou, which is replaced with wo in the back slang version reswort.

In 2010, back slang was reported to have been adopted for the sake of privacy on foreign tennis courts by the young English players Laura Robson and Heather Watson.

== Other languages ==
Other languages have similar coded forms but reversing the order of syllables rather than phonemes. These include:

- French verlan, in which e.g. français [fʁɑ̃sɛ] becomes céfran [sefʁɑ̃];
- French louchébem, which relies on syllables inversion too, but also adds extra syllables;
- Greek podaná (e.g. the word βυζί becomes ζυβί);
- IsiXhosa & isiZulu Ilwimi/Ulwimi used mostly by teenagers, often called "high school language";
- Japanese tougo (倒語), where moras of a word are inverted and vowels sometimes become long vowels (gakusei, “student”, becomes seigaku. sushi becomes shiisuu.);
- Romanian Totoiana, in which syllables of Romanian words are inverted so that other Romanian speakers can not understand it;
- Lunfardo, a Spanish argot spoken in Argentina, includes words in vesre (from revés, literally "backwards");
- Šatrovački, a Serbo-Croatian-Bosnian slang system;
- 19th century Swedish (e.g. the word fika, which means approximately "coffee break").
- Sheng (e.g. ngware becomes rengwa)
- "Coffee spelt backwards is eeffoc", an internet joke popular in Lobotomycore media.

== See also ==
- Costermonger (British street vendors from whom back slang originates)
- Pig Latin
