= Parlesia =

Secret language of Neapolitan musicians

Parlesia (Neapolitan pronunciation: [parleˈsiːa]) is an oral cryptolect and slang historically used by musicians in Naples, Italy. Originating as a jargon to allow performers to communicate privately regarding business, pay, and social matters without being understood by outsiders, it gradually developed into a recognized cant within Neapolitan music culture.

== History ==
Parlesia developed among working-class Neapolitan musicians—particularly posteggiatori (street and restaurant minstrels) and players performing at weddings, local festivals, and theatrical venues. The jargon centered geographically around the Galleria Umberto I (historically referred to as the Galleria di Toledo) in central Naples, where musicians traditionally gathered to negotiate contracts, assemble bands, and arrange gigs.

To protect financial details, discuss client behavior, or comment on working conditions without alerting patrons or bystanders, musicians devised a specialized vocabulary by altering standard Neapolitan words or introducing unique slang terms. Knowledge of the code was passed down orally and reserved for those accepted into the professional musical community.

Throughout the 20th century, Parlesia influenced Neapolitan popular culture. Prominent artists including Pino Daniele, Edoardo Bennato, and Tony Esposito incorporated terms from Parlesia into the lyrics of modern Neapolitan music. In 2023, author Valeria Saggese published a dedicated study and collection of oral histories titled Parlesia. La lingua segreta della musica napoletana.

== Vocabulary ==
The lexicon of Parlesia consists primarily of nouns and verbs grafted onto Neapolitan grammar.

Parlesia	Neapolitan equivalent	English translation
'e bbane	'e sorde	money / cash
'o jamm	'o guaglione / 'ommo	man / guy
'a jamm	'a guagliona / 'a femmena	woman / girl
'o jammone	'o padrone	boss / owner
'o jamm e tashca	chillo ca caccia 'e sorde	the payer / financier
appunì	piglià / carrecà	to take / to load / to enter
spunì	rà / caccià	to give / to unload / to pay out
facimm "addo va"	fernimmo	let's finish / stop
bacone	persona malamente	bad person / untrustworthy individual
'a clitennestra	'a chitarra elettrica	electric guitar
'o pizzicanterra	'o pullasto	chicken
giustine	'e gguardie	police / authorities
'a chiarenzia	'o vino	wine
arcì	fa l'ammore	to make love
'o pistolfe	'o prevete	priest
'a pila	'a paga	wage / payment
'o taleqquale	'o specchio	mirror
accomoffà	capì	to understand

== See also ==
- Cant
- Cryptolect
- Lunfardo
- Verlan
- Louchébem
