= Ubbi dubbi =

Language game based on English

Ubbi dubbi is a language game spoken with the English language. After decades of history and predecessors, it was widely popularized by the 1972–1978 PBS children's show Zoom. When Zoom was revived in 1999 on PBS, Ubbi dubbi was again a feature of the show.

== Rules ==
Ubbi dubbi works by adding -ub- /ʌb/ before each vowel sound in a syllable (or, as a linguist might put it, "insert [ˈʌb] after each syllable onset"). The stress falls on the "ub" of the syllable that is stressed in the original word. In the word "hello" for example, which is stressed on the "-lo" syllable, the stress falls on the "lub" in "hubellubo".

The method of adding "ub" before each vowel sound has been described as "iterative infixation".

== In popular culture ==
A variant of Ubbi Dubbi was popularized as the signature speech pattern of the cartoon character Mushmouth from the animated series Fat Albert and the Cosby Kids (1972), voiced by Bill Cosby. Cosby also used this speech variation in his "Dentist" monologue to illustrate the effects of Novocaine.

In Don DeLillo's novel The Names, the main character's son speaks a variation of Ubbi Dubbi, called "Ob", throughout the novel.

It was used in the episode "Mentalo Case" from the TV series The King of Queens, between character Spence Olchin (Patton Oswalt) and a salesman at a toy convention.

It was used by Penny and Amy in "The Veracity Elasticity", and episode of The Big Bang Theory as a means to counter Sheldon and Leonard's use of Klingon.

In the video game Rayman Origins, the Bubble Dreamer speaks Ubbi Dubbi.

Since 2019, the "Ubbi Dubbi Festival" in Texas has been a major electronic dance music event, whose founder named it after the language game.

== See also ==
- Pig Latin
- -izzle / Dizzouble Dizzutch (a.k.a. "shizzolation")
- Javanais, a similar slang version of French
- Língua do Pê / p-taal in Portuguese, Dutch and Estonian
- Rövarspråket
- Tutnese (language game)
- Farfallino alphabet
- A-Ba-Ni-Bi - a Eurovision winning Hebrew-language song based on a similar /b/-based language game
