= Che (interjection) =

Spanish interjection

Signature used by Ernesto Guevara from 1960 until his death in 1967. His frequent use of the word "che" earned him this nickname.

Che (/tʃeɪ/ CHAY, Spanish: [tʃe]; Portuguese: tchê [tʃe]; Valencian: xe [tʃe]) is an interjection commonly used in Argentina, Uruguay, Bolivia, Paraguay, Brazil (São Paulo and Rio Grande do Sul) and Spain (Valencia), signifying "hey!", "fellow", "guy". Che is mainly used as a noun of address to call someone's attention (akin to "mate!" or "buddy!" in English), but it is often used as filler too (akin to "right" or "so" in English). The Argentine revolutionary Ernesto "Che" Guevara earned his nickname from his frequent use of the expression, which amused his Cuban comrades.

== Etymology ==
Che is an interjection of unclear origin. According to the Diccionario de la Lengua Española, it is comparable to the archaic ce used in Spain to ask for someone's attention or to make someone stop. Che is now mainly used in Argentina, Uruguay, Bolivia and Paraguay. In Brazil, in the state of Rio Grande do Sul, the form tchê is used, and in the state of São Paulo the form ché is used.

In Spain, in the Valencia region, the form xe is used, with a similar meaning.

Due to its spread in South America, alternative etymologies have been suggested by analogy with indigenous words:

- In Tupi-Guarani, spoken by certain ethnic groups from Argentina to Brazil, che means simply "I" or "my."
- In the native Araucanian and Chonan language families of the Southern Cone, che means "man" or "people" and is often used as a suffix for ethnonyms in these languages (such as Mapuche, Huilliche, Tehuelche, and Puelche).
- In Kimbundu, spoken by Congolese slaves during colonial times, xê means "hey!", an interjection for calling someone.

== Usage ==
The first recorded use of che in Spanish America appears to be in 19th-century Argentine writer Esteban Echeverría's short story "The Slaughter Yard" ("El matadero"), published posthumously in 1871 but set in 1838–1839 in the Rosas era.

Che, negra bruja, salí de aquí antes de que te pegue un tajo—exclamaba el carnicero.

("Hey, you black witch, get out of here before I gash you," said the butcher.)

=== Falkland Islands ===
In the Falkland Islands, che is commonly used by English speakers ("G'day che, how's things?"). It can also be written as "chay". The word is sometimes used to describe someone who is a particularly traditional Falkland Islander ("He's a proper che").

=== Valencia ===
In Spain, che is widely used in Valencia and Terres de l'Ebre, Catalonia (written as xe), as an interjection. With the spelling "xe" in Valencian, its main use is to express protest, surprise or exasperation. Xe! is one of the symbols of the Valencian identity to the point where, for example the Valencia CF is often referred to with the nickname "Xe Team".

=== Philippines ===
In the Philippines, che (also spelled cheh) is used to express the dismissing another person or interrupting another person's speech, similar in context to the English expression "Shut up!".

== See also ==
- Argot
- Cocoliche
- Lunfardo
- Re (exclamation) – a similar interjection in the Balkans of identical usage
- Vesre
