= Lunfardo =

Argot of the Río de la Plata region

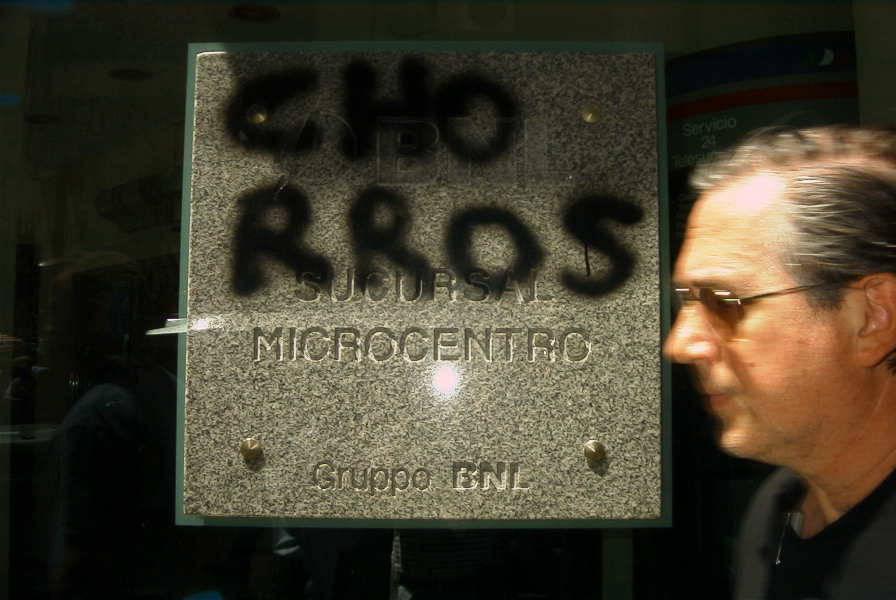
The word chorros (Lunfardo term meaning "thieves") graffitied on the wall of a BNL bank in Buenos Aires, during protests against Corralito, 2002

Lunfardo (Spanish pronunciation: [luɱˈfaɾðo]; from the Italian lombardo, '"of Lombardy"') is an argot originated and developed in the late 19th and early 20th centuries in the lower classes in the Río de la Plata region (encompassing the port cities of Buenos Aires in Argentina and Montevideo in Uruguay) and from there spread to other urban areas nearby, such as the Greater Buenos Aires, Santa Fe and Rosario.

Lunfardo originated from the mixture of languages and dialects produced due to the massive European immigration, mainly Italian and Spanish, which arrived in the ports of the region since the end of the 19th century. It was originally a slang used by criminals and soon by other people of the lower and lower-middle classes. Later, many of its words and phrases were introduced in the vernacular and disseminated in the Spanish of Argentina, and Uruguay. Nevertheless, since the early 20th century, Lunfardo has spread among all social strata and classes by habitual use or because it was common in the lyrics of tango.

Today, the meaning of the term lunfardo has been extended to designate any slang or jargon used in Buenos Aires.

== Etymology ==
Most sources believe that Lunfardo originated among criminals, and later became more commonly used by other classes. Circa 1870, the word lunfardo itself (originally a deformation of lombardo, i.e. an inhabitant of the region of Lombardy in Italy, the origin of many Italians in Argentina in the early 20th century) was often used to mean 'outlaw'.

== Origin ==
Lunfardo (or lunfa for short) began as prison slang in the late 19th century so guards would not understand prisoners. However, the vernacular Spanish of mid-19th century Buenos Aires as preserved in the dialogue of Esteban Echeverría's short story The Slaughter Yard (El matadero) is already a prototype of Lunfardo.

== Lunfardo today ==
Today, many Lunfardo terms have entered the language spoken all over Argentina and Uruguay, although a great number of Lunfardo words have fallen into disuse or have been modified in the era of suburbanization. Furthermore, the term "Lunfardo" has become synonymous with "speech of Buenos Aires" or "Porteño", mainly of the inhabitants of the City of Buenos Aires, as well as its surrounding areas, Greater Buenos Aires. The Montevideo speech has almost as much "Lunfardo slang" as the Buenos Aires speech. Conde says that Lunfardo (much like Cocoliche) can be considered a kind of Italian dialect mixed with Spanish words, specifically the one spoken in Montevideo. In other words, Lunfardo is an interlanguage variety of the Italian dialects spoken by immigrants in the areas of Buenos Aires and Montevideo.

In Argentina, any neologism that reached a minimum level of acceptance is considered, by default, a Lunfardo term. The original slang has been immortalized in numerous tango lyrics.

Conde takes the view that the Lunfardo is not so much a dialect but a kind of local language of the Italian immigrants, mixed with Spanish and some French words. He believes that Lunfardo is not a criminal slang, since most Lunfardo words are not related to crime.

According to Conde, Lunfardo

...is a vernacular, or to put it more clearly, is a vocabulary of popular speech in Buenos Aires that spread first throughout the entire River Plate area and later to the whole country... The use of this lexicon reminds speakers of their identity but also of their roots... Lunfardo is possibly the only argot that was originally formed, and in great measure, from Italian immigrant terms.
[Es un modo de expresión popular o, para decirlo más claramente, un vocabulario del habla popular de Buenos Aires… que se ha extendido primero a toda la región del Río de la Plata y luego al país entero… el uso de este léxico les recuerda a sus usuarios quiénes son, pero también de dónde vienen… el lunfardo es posiblemente el único que en su origen se formó, y en un alto porcentaje, con términos italianos inmigrados].

== Characteristics ==
Lunfardo words are inserted in the normal flow of Rioplatense Spanish sentences, but grammar and pronunciation do not change. Thus, an average Spanish-speaking person reading tango lyrics will need, at most, the translation of a discrete set of words.

Tango lyrics use Lunfardo sparsely, but some songs (such as "El Ciruja"—Lunfardo for "The Hobo" or "The Bum"—or most lyrics by Celedonio Flores) employ Lunfardo heavily. "Milonga Lunfarda" by Edmundo Rivero is an instructive and entertaining primer on Lunfardo usage.

A characteristic of Lunfardo is its use of word play, notably vesre (from "[al] revés"), reversing the syllables, similar to English back slang, French verlan, Serbo-Croatian Šatrovački or Greek Podaná. Thus, tango becomes gotán and café (coffee) becomes feca.

Lunfardo employs metaphors such as bobo ("dumb") for the heart, who "works all day long without being paid" or bufoso ("snorter") for pistol.

Finally, there are words that are derived from others in Spanish, such as the verb abarajar, which means to stop a situation or a person (such as to stop your opponent's blows with the blade of your knife) and is related to the verb "barajar", which means to cut or shuffle a deck of cards.

== Examples ==
=== Nouns ===
- buchón – "snitch", informer to the law (from the Spanish buche, in turn slang for "mouth")
- chochamu – "young man" (vesre for muchacho)
- facha – "face", and by extension "appearance", "looks" (from Italian faccia, "face")
- fato – "affair", "business" (from the Italian fatto, lit. "fact, deed")
- fiaca – "laziness", or lazy person (from the Italian fiacca, "laziness, sluggishness")
- gamba – "leg" (from the Italian gamba "leg"). Also "100 pesos".
- gomías – "friends" (vesre for amigos)
- guita – "money", "dole"
- laburo – "work", "labour"
- lorca – "heat", as in hot weather (vesre for calor, "heat")
- luca – "1,000 pesos"
- mango – "peso"
- mina – "chick", "broad" (from the Brazilian Portuguese mina, slang for menina, "girl" or from the Italian femmina, "female")
- naso – "nose" (from the Italian naso, "nose")
- palo – "1,000,000 pesos"
- palo/s verde/s – "dollars"
- percanta – a young woman
- pibe – "kid", a common term for boy or, in more recent times, for young man. It comes from Italian word "pivello".
- quilombo – "racket", "ruckus", "mess"; also slang for "brothel" (from the Kimbundu word kilombo, a Maroon settlement).
- urso – a heavyset guy. It comes from the Portuguese urso or the Italian orso (bear).
- yorugua – "Uruguayan", (vesre for uruguayo).

=== Verbs ===
- cerebrar – "to think something up" (from cerebro, "brain")
- engrupir – "to fool someone" (maybe from Italian ingroppare, "to fuck", but also used in modern European and Brazilian Portuguese slang)
- garpar – "to pay with money" (vesre for pagar, "to pay")
- junar – "to look closely", "to check out"/ "to know" (from Caló junar, "to hear")
- laburar – "to work" (from Italian lavorare, "to work")
- manyar – "to eat"/ "to know" (from Venetian and Lombard magnar – Italian mangiare)
- morfar – "to eat" (from French argot morfer, "to eat")
- pescar – "to understand", "to get a grip" (vesre from the Italian capisce?, "Do you understand?") associated to the Spanish verb pescar ("to fish")

=== Interjections ===
- che – appellative to introduce a conversational intervention or to call out, translatable as "hey!", "listen to me!", "so", "as I was telling you!" and other ways of addressing someone. The expression identifies Argentines to other Spanish speakers, thus Ernesto "Che" Guevara for the Cubans (Guaraní, Venetian and Valencian origins have been propounded).
- ¡guarda! – "look out!", "be careful!" (from the Italian guarda!, "look!")

== Modern slang ==
Since the 1970s, it is a matter of debate whether newer additions to the slang of Buenos Aires qualify as lunfardo. Traditionalists argue that lunfardo must have a link to the argot of the old underworld, to tango lyrics, or to racetrack slang. Others maintain that the colloquial language of Buenos Aires is lunfardo by definition.

Some examples of modern talk:

- gomas (lit. "tires") – "tits", woman's breasts
- maza (lit. "mace" or "sledgehammer") – "superb"
- curtir (lit. "to tan leather") – "to deal with it", "to dig", "to be knowledgeable about", "to be involved in". Also "to fuck".
- curtir fierros can mean both "to be into car mechanics" or "to be into firearms". Fierro is the Old Spanish form of hierro ("iron"). In Argentine parlance, fierro can mean a firearm or anything related to metals and mechanics (for example a racing car)
- zafar – "to scrape out of", "to get off the hook", "to barely get by", etc. Zafar is a standard Spanish verb (originally meaning "to extricate oneself") that had fallen out of use and was restored to everyday Buenos Aires speech in the 1970s by students, with the meaning of "barely passing (an examination)".
- trucho – "counterfeit", "fake"; trucho is from old Spanish slang truchamán, which in turn derives from the Arabic turjeman ("translator", referring specifically to a person who accosts foreigners and lures them into tourist traps). Folk etymology derives this word from trucha ("trout"), or from the Italian trucco – something made fake on purpose.

Many new terms had spread from specific areas of the dynamic Buenos Aires cultural scene: invented by screenwriters, used around the arts-and-crafts fair in Plaza Francia, culled from the vocabulary of psychoanalysis.

== Influence from Cocoliche ==
Lunfardo was influenced by Cocoliche, a pidgin of Italian immigrants. Many Cocoliche words were transferred to Lunfardo in the first half of the 20th century. For example:

- lonyipietro – "fool"
- fungi – "mushroom" → in Lunfardo: "hat"
- vento – "wind" → in Lunfardo: "money"
- matina – "morning" (from Italian mattina)
- mina – "girl" (from Lombard mina)
- laburar – "to work" (from Italian lavorare and Spanish laborar)
- minga – "nothing!" (from Lombard minga, negative particle like not in English or ne pas in French)
- yeta – "bad luck" (from Neapolitan iettatore)
- yira/yira – "to walk around (generally in circles)", "to ramble aimlessly", etc. (from Italian girare, "to turn", "to tour"). Usually "yiro" or "yira" is used to refer to a prostitute.
- ¡salute! – "cheers!" (from Italian salute!)
- eccole – "exactly" (from Italian eccole)

Some Italian linguists, because of the Cocoliche influences, argue that the Lunfardo can be considered a pidgin of the Italian language.

== Affixes ==
A rarer feature of Porteño speech that can make it completely unintelligible is the random addition of suffixes with no particular meaning, usually making common words sound reminiscent of Italian surnames, for no particular reason, but playful language. These endings include -etti, -elli eli, -oni, -eni, -anga, -ango, -enga, -engue, -engo, -ingui, -ongo, -usi, -ula, -usa, -eta, among others. Examples: milanesa (meat dish) $\longrightarrow$ milanga, cuaderno ("notebook") $\longrightarrow$ cuadernelli, etc.

On the other hand, the addition of prefixes are semantically transparent (as they maintain the part of speech) and contextually limited to the expressive re-, "very" (remierda, "damn shit").

== See also ==
- Cocoliche
- Germanía
- Viveza criolla

== General and cited references ==
- Conde, Oscar (2011). Lunfardo: Un estudio sobre el habla popular de los argentinos. Buenos Aires: Ediciones Taurus. ISBN 978-987-04-1762-0.
- Grayson, John D. (March 1964). "Lunfardo, Argentina's Unknown Tongue". Hispania. 47 (1). American Association of Teachers of Spanish and Portuguese: 66–68. doi:10.2307/337280. JSTOR 337280.
