= Robber language =

Robber language may refer to:

- Thieves' cant
- Rövarspråket, Swedish language game
