= Rövarspråket =

Swedish language game

Rövarspråket (English: The Robber Language) is a Swedish language game. It became popular after the books about Bill Bergson by Astrid Lindgren, where the children use it as a code, both at play and in solving actual crimes.

The formula for encoding is simple. Every consonant (spelling matters, not pronunciation) is doubled, and an o is inserted in-between. Vowels are left intact. It is possible to render the Rövarspråket version of an English word as well as a Swedish, such as the following for the word stubborn:

sos-tot-u-bob-bob-o-ror-non or sostotubobboborornon

The code is not very useful in written form, but it can be difficult to decode when spoken by a trained user speaking quickly. For an untrained speaker, a word or phrase can often be something of a tongue twister or a shibboleth.

Today, the books (and subsequent films) are so well known in Sweden, and also in Norway, that the language is part of the culture of schoolchildren.

== See also ==
- Argot
- Pig Latin
- Tutnese or Double Dutch, similar rules
- Ubbi dubbi
- Javanais
- Gibberish
