= Farfallino alphabet =

Language game

The farfallino alphabet (Italian: alfabeto farfallino) is a language game used primarily in Italy, which can be regarded as an elementary form of substitution cipher. It is usually used by children for amusement or to converse in (perceived) privacy from adults. The name "farfallino" comes from the word "farfalla" (butterfly), which is an ordinary Italian word but sounds like the "codified" words in farfallino alphabet. The farfallino alphabet is similar to games found in other languages such as jerigonza (Spanish/Portuguese), langue de feu (French), Fay Kee Bolee (Urdu) and pig latin (English).

== Rules and variations ==
The usual rules for farfallino alphabet are based on the substitution of each vowel with a 3 letter sequence where the vowel itself is repeated with an interceding f.

- casa → cafasafa
- lago → lafagofo
- stella → stefellafa
- re → refe
- cercare → cefercafarefe

Here is an example:

Quefestofo èfe ufun efesefempifiofo difi frafasefe ifin afalfafabefetofo fafarfafallifinofo. Nofon èfe fafacifilefe, afanchefe peferchèfe vafa defettofo ifil pifiùfu vefelofocefe pofossifibifilefe

Its translation in Italian is:

Questo è un esempio di frase in alfabeto farfallino. Non è facile, anche perché va detto il più veloce possibile

Which means, in English:

This is an example of phrase in Farfallino Alphabet. It is not easy, also because you should say it as fast as possible.

There are several minor variations to this scheme. One such variation is based on the following substitution rules:

- a → agasa
- e → eghese
- i → ighisi
- o → ogoso
- u → ugusu

Although rules for e and i look different, they are not; the additional h is needed in Italian to enforce a "hard g" sound for letter g, which is implicit in the other combinations. Another more complicated scheme, which is used in some regions of Italy, is as follows:

- a → aufer
- e → enghel
- i → ix
- o → older
- u → uflez

== See also ==
- Língua do Pê
- Ubbi dubbi
- Javanais
- Tutnese
