= Secret speech (disambiguation) =

Secret speech may refer to:

- On the Cult of Personality and Its Consequences, Khrushchev's Secret Speech
- Hitler's Obersalzberg Speech, Adolf Hitler's 1939 secret speech to his supreme commanders
- The Secret Speech (novel), a novel by Tom Rob Smith
- Secret language (disambiguation)
