= Tutnese =

African-American language game

Gloria Mcilwain saying "Circle" in Tutnese (Southern Dialect)

Gloria Mcilwain saying "Welcome" in Tutnese (Southern Dialect)

Gloria Mcilwain saying "Bubbles" in Tutnese (Southern Dialect)

Tutnese (also known as Tut) is an argot created by enslaved Black Americans based on Black-American Vernacular English as a method to covertly teach and learn spelling and reading.

== Language rules ==
In Tutnese, vowels are pronounced normally, or pronounced as their letter name, but each consonant is replaced with a different syllable. The linguistics journal American Speech published the following table detailing syllables that replace consonants in Tutnese:

Letter	Tut syllable	Letter	Tut syllable	Letter	Tut syllable
B	bub	K	kak	S	sus
C	cut	L	lul	T	tut
D	dud	M	mum	V	vuv
F	fuf	N	nun	W	wax
G	gug	P	pup	X	ex
H	hash	Q	quack	Y	yak
J	jag	R	rut*	Z	zuz

*When spoken before /dud/, /rut/ is changed to /rud/

A different set of syllables for the language game had appeared in The New York Times Magazine several decades earlier, and the author noted the similarities between the "Tutahash" and the "Double Dutch" language game, which he claimed to be the third most widely spoken language game in the United States when he was writing in 1944, but he also indicated several differences between the two, detailed in the following table:

Letter	Tutahash	Double Dutch (if different)	Letter	Tutahash	Double Dutch (if different)	Letter	Tutahash	Double Dutch (if different)
B	bub		K	kuk		S	sus	
C	cus	cash	L	lul		T	tut	
D	dud		M	mum		V	vuv	
F	fuf		N	nun		W	w	wash
G	gug		P	pup		X	ex	xux
H	hash	hutch	Q	quack		Y	yum	yub
J	jug		R	rur	rug	Z	zuz	zub

Double letters in a word, rather than being repeated, are preceded by the syllable square to indicate doubling.

For example, "tree" becomes "Tutrugsquatee" and "I took a walk to the park yesterday" becomes "I tutsquatohkuck a wackalulkuck tuto tuthashe pubarugkuck yubesustuteruddudayub."

== History ==
Enslaved African Americans were not permitted to read or write, and could be severely punished if they were discovered to be literate. African Americans in the southeastern United States created Tutnese to covertly teach spelling and reading.

In the mid-1990s, Gloria McIlwain published an academic article and a book on the Tut language.

=== 2020s revival ===
In 2021, Tutnese gained traction on social media platforms including Discord, Google Classroom and TikTok. For some social media users, learning Tutnese was a way to preserve African American traditions and culture, so they began sharing and teaching the language as part of broader efforts to reconnect with their heritage and ancestral traditions. Discussions on these platforms have included debate over how the language should be shared and who should be considered appropriate custodians of its tradition.

Contemporary commentary on Tutnese has emphasized cultural ownership and whether the tradition should be taught outside the communities that historically maintained it. The social media discourse saw debate over gatekeeping, with some advocating for its being shared only in closed groups among African Americans whose ancestors were enslaved in the United States while others promoted public sharing of Tut and its rules among as many African Americans as possible. One essay describing a modern revival of Tut on TikTok characterizes the practice as subject to “secrecy and gatekeeping,” and reports that some participants argue it should remain within African-American descendant communities due to a history of cultural appropriation.

=== Literary mentions ===
In Ernest Thompson Seton's book Two Little Savages, the protagonist, Yan, learns the "Tutnee" language from another boy at camp and tries to teach it to his friends Sam and Giles. Seton presents Tutnee alongside many Native American stereotypes but does not mention its African American origin.

Maya Angelou mentions learning Tutnese as a child in I Know Why the Caged Bird Sings, the first volume of her series of autobiographies. She and her friend Louise "spent tedious hours teaching ourselves the Tut language. You (yak oh you) know (kack nug oh wug) what (wack hash a tut). Since all the other children spoke Pig Latin, we were superior because Tut was hard to speak and even harder to understand. At last I began to understand what girls giggled about. Louise would rattle off a few sentences to me in the unintelligible Tut language and would laugh. Naturally I laughed too. Snickered, really, understanding nothing. I don't think she understood half of what she was saying herself, but, after all, girls have to giggle..."

Some contemporary cultural discourse includes the use of the ethnonym Soulaan to describe lineage-based Black American identity have resurfaced Tutnese in the language discourse as a closed language.

=== Cultural references ===
The Tut language is featured in the opera Lalovavi, part of the Black Opera Project of the Cincinnati Opera featuring Morris Robinson, which was staged in July of 2026.

== See also ==
- Gibberish (language game)
- Leet
- Pig Latin
- Rövarspråket
- Verlan
