= Purishte =

Language

Purishte (Albanian definite form: Purishtja) is a sociolect of the Albanian language spoken by the masons of the Opar region in Western Korçë District, Albania.

== Location ==
The former commune of Lekas in Western Korçë District consists of mainly speakers of Purisht. It is overall spoken in the thirteen villages of the ethnographic region of Opar in southeastern Albania, which includes parts of the Lekas and Moglica communes.

=== Diaspora Purisht ===
Purisht is spoken by those who have migrated out of its home region into the Albanian cities of Korçë, Tirana and Durrës, as well as by migrants outside of Albania's borders, primarily in Greece.

== Vocabulary ==
In the Purishte sociolect the mason is called purja, while the term for the master mason is purja i beshëm.

=== Romance influence ===
Purishte is notable for incorporating a large share of vocabulary of Romance origin, including most notably elements of Aromanian origin. Several aspects of the Aromanian influences in Purishte may be considered Balkanisms. Romance elements compose nearly 16% of the registered lexical items of Purisht, with almost all of them being of Aromanian origin. This is a result of intensive cultural contact between Opar Albanians and Aromanians.

== See also ==
- Banjački, south Slavic sociolect of bricklayers in Podrinje, western Balkans
- Meshterski, sociolect of south Bulgarian builders, bricklayers and masons
