= Italo-Paulista =

Italian-Portuguese macaronic language of Brazil

- Paulistalian
- ítalo-paulista; paulistaliano
- Native to: Brazil
- Region: São Paulo
- Ethnicity: Caipira; Italian Brazilians
- Language family: Pidgin, Romance based: Italo-Paulista

Language codes
- ISO 639-3: None (mis)

The Italo-Paulista (Ítalo-paulista), also known as Paulistalian, is a language that blends Italian dialects with the Caipira dialect. It was widely spoken by Italian immigrants and their descendants until the early 1960s in São Paulo State, especially in the Greater São Paulo region. Italo-Paulista or Paulistalian was commonly spoken on the streets of São Paulo.

In 1911, the poet Oswald de Andrade, of Portuguese descent, under the Italian pseudonym "Annibale Scipione," created the magazine Cartas D’Abax’O Pigues, using language as a means of publication. Consequently, in 1915, the Brazilian magazine O Queixoso used the expression "língua do Abaixo Piques" ("Abaixo Piques language") to promote the Italo-Paulista publication La Divina Increnca by Juó Bananère.

== History ==
At the beginning of the 20th century, Italian and its dialects were spoken almost as much as Portuguese in São Paulo, influencing the formation of the current Paulista dialect. With influences from the Caipira language, native to São Paulo, the Italo-Paulista was created by the thousands of Italian immigrants who settled in the state. Later, this language became extensively documented by authors such as Oswald de Andrade and Juó Bananère.

...(with "Italiano maccheronico") we are thus faced with a particular use of the Italian immigrant's language. Italian which is undoubtedly unique in its kind, and caricatures the dialect "caipira" paulistano mixed with the dialectal varieties of popular Italian.Popular precisely because São Paulo was a melting-pot of influences reflected in the people's language... E. Carnevale

After the publication of Cartas D’Abax’O Pigues, it began to be portrayed as a "macarronic" language, with different definitions such as a language composed of a mixture of others; incomprehensible, etc. However, not to be confused with the more strongly conserved Talian dialect, which is more strongly preserved, primarily based on Venetian lexicon and grammar, with contributions from other languages of northern Italy. Talian is spoken by more isolated communities in Rio Grande do Sul and Santa Catarina, as well as in certain areas of Paraná, Mato Grosso, and Espírito Santo. In contrast, Italo-Paulista was socially a more distinctly urban code-switching, often fading over time according to the speaker.

=== Italians in São Paulo ===
Descendants of Italians are 34% of the Paulistas, totaling more than 13 million people. In the city of São Paulo, the Italian population is one of the largest in the world, with a presence throughout the municipality. Out of the 12 million inhabitants of the capital, approximately 5 million have full or partial Italian ancestry, surpassing the number of Italian descendants in any Italian city (the largest city in Italy is Rome, with 2.5 million inhabitants).

Every year people of Italian descent gather in neighborhoods in São Paulo such as Bixiga, Brás, and Mooca, as well as in various other municipalities in the state, to promote traditional festivals. Among the most well-known festivals are the Feast of Saint Vito, Feast of San Gennaro, Italian Colony Festival of Quiririm, Polenta Festival of Santa Olímpia, etc.

== Examples ==
Italian and several dialects of the Italian Peninsula influenced the Portuguese of Brazil in the areas with the highest concentration of immigrants, as in the case of Sao Paulo. There the coexistence between Portuguese and Italian has created a much more open and less nasalized speech than the Portuguese of Rio de Janeiro. The diversity of the language among Italian immigrants resulted in a way of speaking substantially different from the Caipira, which was predominant in the region before the arrival of Italians. The new speech was forged by the blending of Calabrian, Neapolitan, Venetian, Portuguese, and Caipira dialects.

In the songs by the Italian-Brazilian Adoniran Barbosa, the son of immigrants from Cavarzere (Venezia), the "Italian Samba" song is a good representative of foreign speaking in Brazil. With a typically Brazilian rhythm, the author mixes Portuguese and Italian, demonstrating what was happening and still occurs in some neighborhoods of Sao Paulo with the Italo-Paulista:

Va brincar en il mare en il fondo,
Mas atencione per tubarone, ouvisto?

Translation:

Go to play in the sea, in the deep,
but pay attention to the shark, did you hear?

=== Poetry Sonetto Futuriste by Juó Bananère ===
Italo-Paulista	Italian	Portuguese	English
Tegno una brutta paxó,	Ho una grande passione,	Tenho uma grande paixão,	I have a great passion,
P'rus suos gabello gôr di banana,	Per i tuoi capelli del colore di una banana,	Pelos seus cabelos cor de banana,	For your hair the color of a banana,
I p'rus suos zoglios uguali dus lampió	E per i tuoi occhi come l'illuminazione di una lanterna	E pelos seus olhos iguais a um lampião	And for your eyes like a lantern's illumination
La da igregia di Santanna.	Dalla chiesa di Santana.	Lá da igreja de Santana.	From the church of Santana.
È mesimo una perdiçó,	È davvero una tentazione,	É mesmo uma perdição,	It's truly a temptation,
Ista bunita intaliana,	Questa bella italiana,	Essa bonita italiana,	This beautiful Italian,
Che faiz alembrá os gagnó	Che fa venire in mente i guadagni	Que faz lembrar os ganhos	That brings to mind the gains
Da guerre tripolitana.	Della guerra tripolitana.	Da guerra tripolitana.	Of the Tripolitan war.
Tê uns lindo pesigno	Ha dei graziosi piedini	Tem uns lindos pezinhos	She has lovely little feet
Uguali c'os passarigno,	Come gli uccelli,	Iguais aos passarinhos,	Like the birds,
Che stó avuáno nu matto;	Che volano tra i cespugli;	Que estão voando no mato;	Flying in the bushes;
I inzima da gara d'ella,	E sul suo viso,	E em cima da cara dela,	And on her face,
Té una pinta amarella	C'è un neo giallo,	Tem uma pinta amarela	There's a yellow mole,
Uguali d'un carrapatto	Simile a una zecca.	Igual a um carrapato	Resembling a tick.

== See also ==
- Adoniran Barbosa, composer in Italo-Paulista dialect
- Carcamano, the dated pejorative term for Italians in Brazil
- Cocoliche, the analogous Spanish-Italian interlanguage in the River Plate area
- Italian language in Brazil

== Bibliography ==
- Carnevale, Edoardo. La condizione dell’emigrante italiano nella città di São Paulo: testi e contesti di rappresentazione dello spazio raccontato Universita' di Milano. Milano, 2014.
