= Banjački =

Banjački is a secret language used by bricklayers from Podrinje region (eastern Bosnia and western Serbia).

The language was invented by brickworkers from Osat in eastern Bosnia and later spread to surrounding regions. Brickworkers use it when they want to hide something from their employers. Serbian author Dragan Panić classifies it as a variant of šatrovački.

== Samples ==
Cyrillic		Latin		
Banjački	Serbian	Banjački	Serbian	English
Кулаба кећаст, не убањава гарачу, шушљику и рушу да се попири!	Газда је лош, не да кафу, ракију и пиво да се попије!	Kulaba kećast, ne ubanjava garaču, šušljiku i rušu da se popiri!	Gazda je loš, ne da kafu, rakiju i pivo da se popije!	The boss is bad, he doesn't allow [us] coffee, rakija or beer!
У кулабинице се шумно кећурају коњиштаре и тавже шумне чкојалице.	Газдарица има добре груди, а има и добре ноге.	U kulabinice se šumno kećuraju konjištare i tavže šumne čkojalice.	Gazdarica ima dobre grudi, a ima i dobre noge.	The boss's wife has nice breasts and legs.

== See also ==
- Meshterski
- Purishte

== Literature ==
- Nametak, Alija (1955). "Banjački govor na području Srebrenice". Bilten Instituta za proučavanje folklora. 3. Sarajevo.
- Šćepanović, Mihailo; Đukanović, Petar (1997). "Banjački (tajni jezik osaćkih majstora)". Srpski jezik - studije srpske i slovenske. II (1–2): 131–151.
