= Étude sur l'argot français =

Book by Marcel Schwob

Étude sur l'argot français ("Study of French slang") was the first publication in book form by the French linguist and author of short stories, Marcel Schwob. The book's co-author was Georges Guieysse. It was written in 1888 when the two had been attending the lectures of Ferdinand de Saussure and Michel Bréal at the Collège de France. On 12 May 1889, soon after they had corrected the proofs, Guieysse committed suicide at the age of 20. The book was published in that year by Émile Bouillon in Paris.

This short work is notable as the first full demonstration of the deliberate alterations of words that help to form the vocabulary of French slang or argot, and particularly of the special slang typical of the 19th century butchery trade, called Loucherbem. This name is a deliberate rearrangement of boucher ("butcher") and is itself an example of the processes discussed in the book.

Étude sur l'argot français was the first of several contributions by Schwob to the study of the vocabulary of the 15th-century poet François Villon.
