= More, re, and bre =

Interjections in foreign languages

More, re, and bre (with many variants) are interjections and/or vocative particles common to Albanian, Greek, Romanian, South Slavic (Bulgarian, Serbian, Bosnian, Montenegrin and Macedonian), Turkish, Venetian and Ukrainian. According to Eric Hamp, its "locus... [is] more in the Greek world than elsewhere". It is used in colloquial speech to gain someone's attention, add emphasis, insult, or express surprise or astonishment, similar to the Argentine vocable of unknown origin, "Che."

== Etymology ==
- Albanian:
  - more, morë, ore, mar, mre, moj, mana, mori are Albanian vocative particles. Vladimir Orel and Bardhyl Demiraj connect the Albanian vocative particles with the aorist form of marr (“I took; received”). Which derived from Proto-Albanian *mar(en)-, from Proto-Indo-European *merh₂- (“to pack (up)”) or PIE *(s)mer- (“to assign, allot”). Cognate with Ancient Greek μείρομαι/meíromai (“receive as one's portion”), Latin mereō, merx and Hittite mark (“to divide a sacrifice”).
  - Bij, bi, bre, be are short forms of bijë/bilë (“daughter, girl”) and bir (“son, boy”). Phonetically and semantically close to Messapic *bilia (“daughter”) and *biles (“son”). Bre derived from the PIE root *bʰréh₂ or *bʰrḗh₂ (both possible roots for *bʰréh₂tēr, “brother”). It is suspected that the root could have wider meanings in PIE and used to refer to non-relatives (such as "kinsman", "comrade").
- Greek:
  - from the vocative moré (μωρέ) of the Greek adjective morós (μωρός) "foolish, stupid"; related to Latin mōrus "foolish, silly"; derived from the Indo-European root mûra, maura "dull, stupid".

== Variants ==
- Albanian: moj, oj', mori, more, mana, vore (Arbëresh), bij, bi (feminine) / morë, mor, mar, ore, o(h), mre (masculine) / bre, be (masculine/neutral)
- Bulgarian: мори (mori), бре (bre), бе (be), де (de)
- Greek: μωρέ (moré), βρε (vre), ρε (re), μωρή (morí) (feminine), ωρέ (oré), μπρε (bre), βωρέ (voré) (dialectal)
- Romanian: bre (to get attention), măre (archaic, expressing surprise)
- Macedonian and Serbo-Croatian: бре / bre, море / more, мори / mori
- Turkish: bre
- Ukrainian: бри (bry), бре (bre)
- Venetian: more

== Greek ==
Like "hey!" re can be used as an exclamation, often used to get attention or express surprise, and so it corresponds in some ways to exclamations such as "wow!".

Its original pejorative meaning of 'fool, idiot' is largely lost and it is now used to mean "friend", and thus corresponds in some ways to expressions such as "mate", "pal", "man", "dude". As in the above English examples, re may be used both before or after a phrase: "Ρε, αυτή είναι καλή μπύρα" ("Hey, this is some good beer"), or, "Πάμε για καμια μπύρα, ρε" ("Let's go get a beer, man"). However, it is familiar, so it is not used to older people or to strangers, when it can be considered offensive.

The feminine version, mori, preserves the original pejorative sense regardless of context when used by males, but it is used in familiar context when used among women or in gay slang. In Cyprus, it is common to address either a sister, female cousin, or female friend as "ra", as opposed to re.

When used with loud voice, or with commands, it sounds rude or offensive "Stand up, re" → "You, stand up now!" However, if followed by sy ("you") or the addressee's name it is considered milder, and friendly (e.g., "Stand up, re George" > "Stand up, my friend George"). Of course the above is not always standard since everything depends on the context and the intonation.

It is very common for Greeks raised in Greece but living abroad (especially in the UK) to use re semi-jokingly when speaking English in the same way they use it when they speak Greek (e.g., "Are you serious re?", "How are you re Jim?" ) Similarly, Greek rappers will use it along with the interjection man! as in "Re man".

In the Greek American community of Tarpon Springs, Florida, a variation of the word is used with the same meaning. Instead of the term re, with the rolling of the "r" being said, the Greeks there say "ray", with no rolling of the "r". "Ray" is thus said as in typical English. "Ray, lets go to the Sponge Docks," or "What's up, Ray?" is how the term is used locally. This is common only in Tarpon Springs, and the usage of the term is often mocked by Greek Americans throughout the country.

=== "Re gamoto" ===
In Greece and Cyprus re is often accompanied by a slang word or a profanity, such as gamoto or gamoti (γαμώτο or γαμώτη), meaning fuck!, an exclamation of fury, surprise or admiration that is considered vulgar. In 1992, in her first statement to the Greek journalists minutes after the 100 m hurdles race at the Olympic Games in Barcelona, Voula Patoulidou, the surprise winner, dedicated her medal to her home country by saying "Για την Ελλάδα, ρε γαμώτο" (Gia ten Ellada, re gamoto! "For Greece, goddamit!"), a catchphrase that is still in use; it became emblematic in Greece, and was used and paraphrased in various occasions by the Greek mass media, satirists, Greek bloggers, and ordinary people.

== See also ==
- Balkan sprachbund – Shared linguistic features in southeastern Europe
- Che (Argentinian Spanish) - the Spanish interjection of similar meaning and usage, famous as the nickname of Ernesto "Che" Guevara.
- Malakas
