= Meshterski =

Secret language of Bulgarian builders and masons

Meshterski (Bulgarian: мещерски) or Meshtrenski (мещренски) was a cant, or secret sociolect, of the south Bulgarian builders, bricklayers and masons. The name comes from the word мещра meshtra, "master", from Latin magister. Meshterski served a linguistically isolating purpose, enabling the builders to communicate in secrecy, and a socially isolating purpose, emphasizing the builders' perceived supremacy over their contractors.

== Distribution and vocabulary ==
The sociolect emerged among the Bulgarian masons in southwestern Macedonia, adjacent to the Albanian lands. As a result, it includes a large number of Albanian loanwords, e.g. бука buka, "bread", from bukё; гяхта gyahta, "cheese", from djathë; мерам meram, "to take", from marr. There are much fewer loans from Greek (e.g. лашма lashma, "mud", from λάσπη laspi; карекла karekla, "chair", from καρέκλα karékla) and Turkish (e.g. пиринч pirinch, "rice", from pirinç; сакал sakal, "beard", from sakal). Later, the language spread through migration to northeastern Macedonia (the region of Gotse Delchev), the Rhodope Mountains around Smolyan, and the areas of Asenovgrad, Kazanlak and the sub-Balkan valleys.

Although loanwords often remained semantically unchanged, the Bulgarian vocabulary in the sociolect was substituted with native metaphors, metonyms and words from different roots, so as to conceal the true meaning to outsiders, e.g. мокра mokra ("wet", fem.) for вода voda, "water"; гледач gledach ("looker") for око oko, "eye", обло oblo ("round", neut.) for яйце yaytse, "egg". The lexis of Meshterski included not only professional terms and basic vocabulary, but also other words, including religious terms, such as Светлив Svetliv, "Luminous", referring to God or a saint.

Meshterski also spread to other social areas: it was borrowed by tinsmiths in at least one village in the Rhodopes, although with a much reduced vocabulary and renamed to Ganamarski. Albanian words mediated through Meshterski have also entered informal Bulgarian; these included кекав kekav, "weak, sickly" (from keq); кинти kinti, "money, dough" (from qind, "hundred"), скивам skivam, "to see, to take a look" (from shqyrtoj), келеш kelesh, "squirt, mangy fellow" (from qelesh).

== Examples ==
Cyrillic		Latin		
Meshterski	Bulgarian	Meshterski	Bulgarian	English
Ветай, райчо, ветай!	Върви, слънце, върви!	Vetay, raycho, vetay!	Varvi, slantse, varvi!	Go, Sun, go!
Шуле, доветай балта!	Момче, донеси кал!	Shule, dovetay balta!	Momche, donesi kal!	Boy, bring [some] mud!

== See also ==
- Banjački, the cant of bricklayers in Podrinje, western Balkans
- Purishte, Albanian language sociolect spoken by masons of the Opar region
