= Língua do Pê =

Language game

Língua dos Pês (Portuguese, P Language) is a language game spoken in Brazil and Portugal with Portuguese. It is also known in other languages, such as Dutch, Afrikaans, and Estonian.

== Function ==
There are at least three different "dialects," or variations, of Língua do Pê.

=== "Double talk" dialect ===
This "dialect" of Língua do Pê is just like the Jeringonza and the Idioma F language games in Spanish. It works by repeating the rime of each syllable, beginning it with p (pê in Portuguese). Examples:

- você → vo-po-cê-pê
- gato → ga-pa-to-po
- menino → me-pe-ni-pi-no-po

=== Vowel-changing dialect ===
This "dialect" is similar to the one described above, except for the addition of a vowel-changing rule. When an open syllable (one ending in a vowel) has [o] or [e] as its vowel, that vowel is changed to [ɔ] or [ɛ] respectively.

Example:

- [vɔˈpɔsɛˈpɛ korˈportouˈpou ɔˈpɔ seuˈpeu kaˈpabɛˈpɛlɔˈpɔ]
- Você cortou o seu cabelo? (Did you cut your hair?)

Note that the added p-syllables are stressed, while the rest are not.

=== "Pê" dialect ===
This "dialect" is more like Kongarian (a language game spoken with Hungarian) than the other "dialects" of Língua do Pê. To speak it, the syllable pê is inserted before every syllable. This is the variant most used in Brazilian Portuguese, while the others are more common in European Portuguese.

Example:

- pêLem pêBra pêCo pêMo pêE pêRa pêLe pêGal?
- Lembra como era legal? (Do you remember how cool it was?)

=== Dutch ===
In the Netherlands and Belgium, the most common version is to insert the syllable "ep" before every vowel. Another version is to add the syllable "p" after every vowel and repeat that vowel.

Example:

- De boer woont op het platteland. (The farmer lives in the countryside.)
- Depe bepoer wepoont epop hepet plepattepelepand.
- Depe boepoer woopoont opop hepet plapattepelapand.

== See also ==
- Language game
- Javanais
- Alfabeto farfallino
