= Riocontra =

Type of argot in the Italian language

Riocontra (Italian pronunciation: [rjoˈkontra]) is a type of argot in the Italian language, featuring inversion of syllables in a word or metathesis, and is common in slang and youth language.

== Background ==
The language developed in the 1970s in the neighborhood of Lambrate in Milan, It was made famous by Guido Nicheli and Diego Abatantuono, in the 1983 film Il ras del quartiere. We remember the intervention by some amateurs who appeared sometimes on television in the Portobello program, in which amateurs preferred to reverse the order of the individual sounds and not of the syllables (casa (house) > "asac").

== Formation rules of neologisms ==
In spite of insufficient education and non-standard use of the language, Riocontra speakers have produced a rich lexical repertoire. The passage from the official language to Riocontra occurs as mentioned mainly through the inversion of the syllables, but also with the change of the last vowel and truncation and elision in the last vowel of the neologism formed.

=== Examples ===
The table below summarizes and gives examples of this formation (the cell is left blank when the change does not apply to that term).

Initial term phrase in jargon	Syllable Division	Inversion	truncation	definite article	Translation in Italian	Translation in English
babbo	bab-bo	boba/bobaz (slang suffix)		il/i	padre	father
bambino	bambi-no	nobambi				kid
bella	bel-la	llabe			ciao	hi
bestia	be-stia	stiabe			assai	beast (means a lot, very good, depending on the situation)
capito	capi-to	tocapi				understood
casa	ca-sa	saca				home
cazzo	ca-zzo	zzoca				penis (Intensifier)
chesciato	chescia-to	tocchescia			ricco	rich (from chesciare (make cash), from cash + -are)
cilotto	ci-lotto		lotto		cilum	chillum
cinque	cin-que	quinci				five
culo	cu-lo	locu				ass
crasto	cra-sto	stocra			figo	cool
droga	dro-ga	gadro				drug
fattone	fa-tto-ne		toffa / tofa		drogato	drug addict
figa	fi-ga	gafi				vulva
figo	fi-go	gofi				cool guy
frate	fra-te		tefra		fratello	brother
fumo	fu-mo	moffo				hashish
gabbio	ga-bbio	bioga			gabbia	prison (from gabbia (cage))
gergo	ger-go	gorge				slang
grammo	gra-mmo	mogra				gram
grano	gra-no	nogra				money
grasso	gra-sso	sogra			sostanzioso	substantial
schiaffo	fo-schia	foschia/fischia				slap
aggiunta	iunta-agg'		iunta			adding a dose to the drugs sold by the dealer
peso	pe-so	sope				heavy (difficult situation)
piazza	pia-zza	zapia				square (neighborhood)
pizza	pi-zza	zapi				
scudo	scu-do	doscu				5 euros (etim. from Italian scudo)
tipa	ti-pa	pati				girl
troia	tro-ia	iatro				bitch
ladro	la-dro	drola				thief
merda	mer-da	damer				escrement
mezza	zza-me	zame				half (50 euro)
palo	lo-pa	lopa				pole (1000 euro)
madama	ma-da-ma	mamada			polizia	madame (police)
madre	ma-dre	drema				mother
mezzo	me-zzo	zome			mezzo di traporto	means of transport / vehicle
padre	pa-dre	drepa				father
pere	pe-re	repe			seno	breasts
pippare	pippa-re	repippa			sniffare cocaina	snorting cocaine (from pipa (pipe))
pula	pu-la	lapu			polizia	police (from the Milanese pulé or from pulotto)
pulito	puli-to	topuli				clean
birra	bi-rra	rabi				beer
sbatta	sba-tta	tasba			impegnativo (from sbattimento)	challenging
storia	sto-ria	riasto			qualcosa	history (something)
selvaggia	sel-vaggia	gioselva		la/le	ragazza prosperosa	busty girl
sborra	sbo-rra	rasbo			sperma	sperm
schifosi	schi-fo-se	fosischi				filthy
lurido	luri-do	doluri			Paninaro (sandwich maker)	filthy (Food truck)
sgamo	sga-mo	mosga				suss out To find out something secret
strada	stra-da	dastra				road (neighborhood)
sbirro	sbi-rro	rosbi				policeman/cop
spaccino	spa-cci-no		cispa			drug dealer
soldi	sol-di	disol				money
suono	suo-no	nosuo				money
lavoro	lavo-ro	rolavo				work/job
treno	tre-no	notre				train
cesso	ce-sso	soce				toilet (ugly boy/girl)
scopare	sco-pa-re	rescopa				to sweep (to fuck)
pezzo	pe-zzo	zope			pezzo di hashish	piece of hashish
prete	pre-te	tepre				priest (guy with a clean record)
vecchio	ve-cchio	chiove		il/la		elder
vibrazione	vibra-zio-ne	vibranezio				vibration
vino	vi-no	novi				wine
a caso	a ca-so	a soca			casualmente	casually
alla grande	alla-gran-de		alla degra			great
di brutto	di-bru-tto	di tobru			tantissimo	a lot
figa di legno	fi-ga-di-le-gno	gafi di gnole				wooden pussy (chaste, restrained girl)
bella di brutto	be-lla-di-bru-tto	labe di tobru				very beautiful
chili di grano	chi-li-di-gra-no	lochi di nogra				kilos of money (a lot of money)
Dio cane	dio-ca-ne	dio neca				dog god (blasphemous profanity)
schifo al cazzo	schi-fo-al-ca-zzo	foschi allo zoca				it sucks
tocco di fumo	to-cco-di-fu-mo	cotto di moffo				piece of hashish

== The r move ==
The pronunciation of the letter "r" at the end of an inverted word risks merging with the next word or even not being pronounced, so it is placed between the two syllables once inverted to make the pronunciation more fluid.

- Furto - toFu(r) - to(r)Fu............. Torfu
- Carte - teCa(r) - te(r)Ca............... Terca
- Morte - teMo(r) - te(r)Mo............... Termo

The exception is the word merda, which although it can become darme, becomes damer or rdame

Some syntactic gemination also happens:

- chesciato → tochescia → tocchescia
- Riccone → nericco → nerrico
- tocco → ccoto → cotto

It should also be noted that, with the inversion, the plural is lost.

- Babbi → (i) boba
- Sbirri → (i) rosbi
- Selvagge → (le) gioselva
- Tipe → (le) pati
- Chili → (i) lochi

== Developments of the riocontra ==
The riocontra then gradually spread throughout Italy with the advent of trap music, as the language of the youth groups. Taking up mechanisms similar to those of French verlan, similar jargons have also been established in other Western countries. On the other hand, the trancorio developed in the Mompiano district of Brescia. The Milanese rapper Nerone is until now the only one to have written a song almost entirely in Riocontra. The song is ironically titled La Miaccade Llade Scacru, or "La Accademia della Crusca" (Album: Max, 2017) or Foschi al zzoca (schifo al cazzo) (Album: DM EP, 2020). The Milanese rapper Lazza usually uses Riocontra in his productions as with the album Zzala. Quentin40 and Puritano's Thoiry piece is also of relevance for its jargon based on apocope or shortenings.

== Bibliography ==
- Aldofre e Nigiova Di Nobru, "Il Riocontra illutostra", Giulio è in Audi editore, 2017

== See also ==
- Jargon
- Verlan
- Vesre
- Furbesco
- Farfallino alphabet
