= Cocoliche =

Italian-Spanish pidgin language of Buenos Aires

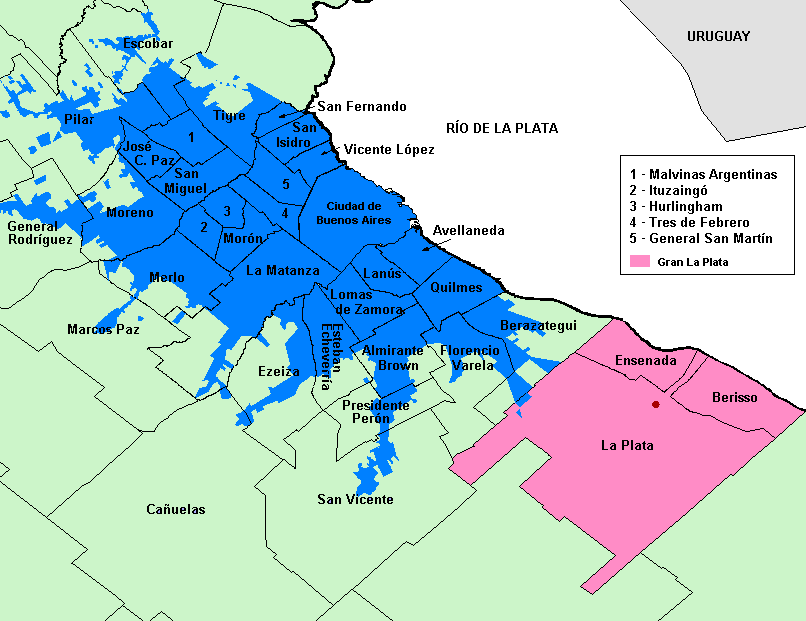
In blue, the Gran Buenos Aires where Cocoliche developed

Cocoliche is an Italian–Spanish contact language or pidgin that was spoken by Italian immigrants between 1870 and 1970 in Argentina (especially in Greater Buenos Aires) and from there spread to other urban areas nearby, such as La Plata, Rosario and Montevideo, Uruguay. In recent decades it has become more respected and even recorded in music and film. Traces of it may be found in Argentina, Brazil, Albania, Panama, Quebec, Uruguay, Venezuela, San Marcos, Cabo Verde and many other places.

== History ==
Between 1880 and 1910, Argentina, and also Uruguay, received a large number of Italian immigrants, mostly poor country folk who arrived with little or no schooling in the Spanish language or Italian, although they were speakers of their own local languages of Italy.

As those immigrants strove to communicate with the local criollos, they produced a variable mixture of Spanish with Italian (Florentine) and other Italian languages, which was given the name Cocoliche by the locals.

The name Cocoliche originated in an 1884 pantomime adaptation by José Podestá of a theatre production titled Juan Moreira. One night one of the actors began an improvised exchange with a Calabrian stage hand name Antonio "Cocoliche" Cuccolicchio, which brought delight to the audience due to Cocoliche's "broken" Spanish with Italian characteristics. This resulted in the introduction of a recurring comedic character named Francisco Cocoliche with that same way of speaking, influencing how the language of the Italian immigrants was viewed in Argentine popular culture. Thereafter, the name of Cocoliche came into Argentine vernacular to refer to the mixed Italian-Spanish language that the Italian immigrants spoke in Argentina.

Italian proper never developed in Argentina, especially because most immigrants used their local languages, and were not proficient in the standard language. This inhibited the development of an Italian-language culture. Since the children of the immigrants grew up speaking Spanish at school, work, and military service, Cocoliche remained confined mostly to the first and second generation of Italian immigrants, and slowly fell out of use.

=== Controversy ===
Cocoliche has sparked controversy amongst Spanish language scholars since its inception in the 19th century. In 1960, the philologist Américo Castro lamented the Italian influence on Spanish that it caused, stating that it "has contributed more than anything to tear apart the language of Buenos Aires." Argentine Author Jorge Luis Borges directly argues with Castro's essay in a letter, stating mainly that his idea of a Spanish language of Buenos Aires having to be as pure as that of Castile is folly. According to Borges, the Italian influences of Argentine Spanish do not take away from the dignity of the language. Furthermore, he references his travels throughout Spain, where he mentions that Spaniards do not speak better than Argentines even with a "purer" Spanish, meaning that if anything, Cocoliche's influence has only strengthened the language.

Its status as a pidgin has been contested by linguists and philologists throughout the 20th century. Argentine linguist María Beatriz Fontanella De Weinberg posits that the language never became a pidgin due to the clear attempts of the government to integrate immigrants, leading Cocoliche to quickly disappear as immigrants rapidly adopted the culture and Spanish language of Argentina. She states it didn't have the reason to remain and become a pidgin because it was not necessary to thrive in oppressive circumstances the way other pidgins have.

== Influence ==
Following Cocoliche's introduction into normal Argentine Spanish speech, and its subsequent disappearance as an independent language, it left many traces of itself in local language. It intermixed with existing Argentine Spanish characteristics like voseo and yeismo while providing a new intonation for the Rioplatense Spanish variety and its neighboring dialects.

Many Cocoliche words were transferred to Lunfardo. For example:

- manyar ("to eat") from Venetian magnar, Lombard magnà and Neapolitan magnare (mangiare in Italian)
- lonyipietro (fool)
- fungi (mushroom) -> in Lunfardo: hat
- vento (wind) -> in Lunfardo: money
- matina (morning) from Italian "mattina"
- mina (girl) from Lombard "mina" (exhibistionist and alluring woman, busty woman or prostitute)
- laburar (to work) from Italian "lavorare"
- minga (nothing) from Lombard "minga" (negative particle like not in English or ne pas in French)
- yeta (bad luck) from Neapolitan iettare (to jinx)
- yira (to go for a walk) from Italian "girare"
- salute (cheers) from Italian "salute"
- fiaca (laziness) from Italian "fiacca"

Some of these words show a characteristic co-dialect evolution, for example in the case of manyar, the word manyar exists with the same meaning in Spanish even though it is considered jargon and not proper Spanish, being derived from Occitan manjer and reinforced by the Italian mangiare.

== See also ==
- Adoniran Barbosa, composer in the analogous Italian-Portuguese pidgin.
- Italian immigration to Argentina
- Lunfardo
- Talian dialect
