= Secret language =

Secret language may refer to:

- Cant, also known as cryptolect, the jargon or argot of a group, often employed to exclude or mislead people outside the group
- Argot, strictly a proper language with its own grammar, used to prevent understanding by outsiders; sometimes argot is used as a synonym of cant or jargon
- Sacred language, also called a ceremonial or a ritual language, which is only learned and used by a select initiated group
- Cryptophasia, "private languages" of young children, especially twins

== See also ==
- Cryptography, the practice and study of hidden information
- Language game, a system of manipulating spoken words to render them incomprehensible to the untrained ear
