= Rosarigasino =

Language game

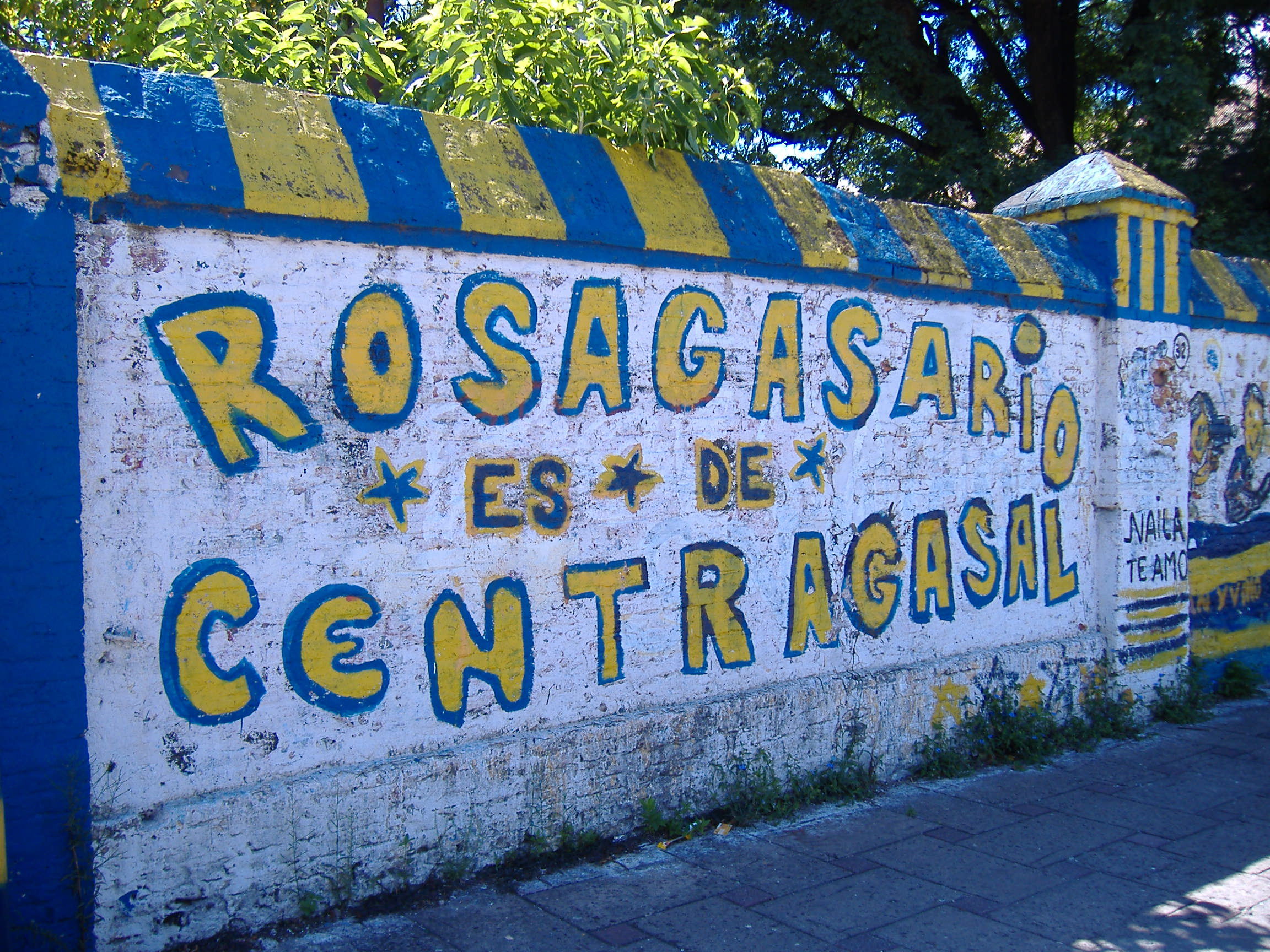
A soccer-related example of rosarigasino in a graffiti.

Rosarigasino (also known as Gasó) is a language game (in the form of a rhyming slang) traditionally associated with the city of Rosario, province of Santa Fe, Argentina, even though very few people, if any, currently employ it.

It is similar to the much more common game of jeringonza. The exact origins of this language remain uncertain, but scholars and historians agree that it was created in the early 20th century by local prisoners to communicate with each other without being understood by guards.

Rosarigasino functions by adding two syllables to each word by inserting the sequence -gas- immediately after the stressed vowel and then repeating that vowel, followed by the rest of the word. The term rosarigasino itself is formed in this way, after the local residents' demonym (rosarino). Other examples (with the added sounds in bold):

colectivo ("bus") → colectigasivo
Monumento a la Bandera ("Flag Memorial") → Monumegasento a la Bandegasera
peatonal ("pedestrian street") → peatonagasal
Calle Córdoba ("Córdoba St.") → Cagasalle Cogasórdoba

In the city of Rosario there is a sort of Academia or Association of Gasó. Besides, in some places it is possible to purchase manuals or learning books. In 2005, a complete rosarigasino version of Cervantes' novel Don Quixote de la Mancha was published, entitled Don Quijogasote de la Magasancha and translated by Bernardo "Chiquito" Reyes.

In 2001 the filmmaker Rodrigo Grande made a film named Rosarigasinos using this same term.
