= Šatrovački =

Serbo-Croatian argot

Šatrovački (Serbo-Croatian pronunciation: [ʃâtroʋatʃkiː]; Serbian Cyrillic: шатровачки) or šatra (Serbo-Croatian pronunciation: [ʃâtra]; Serbian Cyrillic: шатра) is an argot within the Bosnian, Serbian and Croatian languages comparable to verlan in French or vesre in Spanish.

Šatrovački was initially developed by Roma and various marginal subcultures and criminal groups in Yugoslavia, who employed it as a device of secret communication. The term "Šatrovački" is attested in Serbian literature as early as the year 1900, as a secret language of gamblers in Aleksinac. As late as 1954 for instance, a German-Croatian dictionary translated "šatrovački" as "Yenish speech". By the year 1981, however, one could find elements of šatrovački in the speech of very different strata of Zagreb society, from prostitutes and prisoners to scientists and professors. With each generation, more elements are added to the Šatrovački register. It is more widespread in urban areas, such as Belgrade and Novi Sad (Serbia), Zagreb (Croatia) and Sarajevo (Bosnia and Herzegovina).

== Usual šatrovački ==
Words are formed by replacing the syllable order. For example: pivo (beer), becomes vopi. The new word has the same meaning as the original word stem. Since the spelling is nearly phonetic, it does not change. However, sometimes one of the vowels is changed to make the new word easier to pronounce, avoid ambiguity, or if the stem word is not in the nominative case. For example, trava ("grass", marijuana) would become vutra instead of vatra ("fire").

Some words are more commonly spoken in Šatrovački than others, but there is no specific rule. Examples of transformed sentences (although, most of the words in a single sentence are rarely transformed) are:

- Brate, neću da igram fudbal. — Tebra, ćune da grami balfud. ("Bro, I don't want to play football.")
- Zemun zakon brate. — Munze konza tebra. (literally: "Zemun is the law, bro" - meaning: "Zemun rules, dude")
- Pazi brate, murija! — Zipa tebra, rijamu! ("Watch out mate - cops!", murija slang for police)

=== Examples ===
- zeldi - dizel (Dizelaši, chavs)
- ciba - baci (throw; imperative)
- mojne - nemoj (don't; imperative)
- loma - malo (a little, few)
- tebra - brate (brother; vocative)
- Ganci - Cigan (Gypsy)
- ljakse - seljak (peasant, redneck)
- zipa - pazi (watch out, pay attention; imperative)
- tenkre - kreten (retard)
- zabr nahra - brza hrana (fast food)
- hopsi - psiho (psychopath)
- vugla - glava (head, derived from accusative)
- ljadro - drolja (slut)
- vutra - trava (weed, marijuana)
- fuka - kafa (coffee)
- gudra - droga (drugs)
- vopi - pivo (beer)
- suljpa - pasulj (beans)
- vozdra - zdravo (hello)
- dismr - smrdi (stinks)
- žika - kaži (say, speak; imperative)
- konza - zakon (law, great, excellent)
- balfud - fudbal (soccer)
- vuspra - sprava (device, spliff)
- cupi - pica (cunny, pretty girl, usually pejorative)
- rijamu - murija (cops, pejorative)
- sajsi - sisaj (suck; imperative)
- Šone - Nešo (hypocorism, usually vocative (Note: Names in šatrovački are usually derived from vocative (e.g. Nešo, Mišo), but in some dialects, that form is also the nominative))
- Šomi - Mišo (hypocorism, usually vocative)
- Kizo - Zoki (hypocorism)
- Rijama - Marija
- Kblo Konza - Blok Zakon (Block rules)
- Munze Konza - Zemun Zakon (Zemun rules)
- tozla - zlato (gold)
- pakšu - šupak (asshole)
- racku - kurac (dick, penis)
- čkapi - pička (cunt, pussy)
- žmu - muž (husband)
- Rajvosa - Sarajevo
- ne rise - ne seri (no shit, cut the crap; imperative)
- sepra - prase (pig)
- šipu - puši (smoke, blow; imperative)

== Utrovački ==
Utrovački (Утровачки) is a more complex form of šatrovački. Words are formed using: U + last part + ZA + first part + NJE. E.g. vikipedija (Wikipedia) becomes ukipedijazavinje. Today, utrovački is not widely used.

Alternative Utrovački is same as above, but without "ZA", e.g. pivo (beer) becomes uvopinje, or cigare (cigarettes) becomes ugarecinje.

== Syllable omission ==
A more simplified version of šatrovački is using only parts of the word, while excluding the first syllable, and is most commonly used among young people in Serbia. For example, koncert (concert) would be shortened to cert. The rules of creating a new word that can be used in nominative while the stem is not apply similarly to standard šatrovački. An example of a full sentence would be:

Drugar i ja idemo na koncert na Tvrđavi. (My friend and I are going to a concert on the Fortress)
Gari i ja idemo na cert na Đavi.

This is particularly characteristic of Novi Sad youth subculture, and is very rarely spoken outside of Vojvodina.

=== Common examples ===
- zika - muzika (music)
- cert - koncert (concert)
- Đava - tvrđava (fortress, almost exclusively refers to Petrovaradin fortress in Novi Sad)
- gari - drugar (friend)
- fika - trafika (news stand)
- kić - sokić (diminutive of juice)
- nica - stanica (station)
- šulja - košulja (shirt)
- lone - pantalone (trousers)
- tike - patike (sneakers)
- njačić - vinjačić (Diminutive for Vinjak, an alcoholic drink similar to Cognac)
- tija - kutija (box)
- ljara - pepeljara (ashtray)
- ljada - hiljada (thousand)
- bica - torbica (small bag)
- čka - pička (cunt, pussy)
- pač - štampač (printer)
- činka - palačinka (crêpe, pancake)
- ler - diler (drug dealer, usually of marijuana)
- ket - paket (package or anything packed or wrapped)
- ćoza - kaprićoza (usually refers to Pizza capricciosa, but can be used for any kind of pizza)

== Adding syllables ==
A very rare but present form of expression found in the Belgrade projects (blokovi). Words are reconstructed by adding various suffixes so that the original word remains relatively intact. Usually, the basis is šatrovački. The resulting words have a generally diminutive meaning.

=== Examples ===
- kajblo or kićblo - blok (Blok of suburb Blokovi or New Belgrade)
- kićso or kajso - sok (juice)
- pajdo - dop (heroin)

These diminutives can later be combined using the Šatrovački method, resulting in words like kajblo, or kićblo. It is hard to locate the origin of this version of the urban dialect, but it is found in neighbourhoods of Karaburma, Zemun and New Belgrade.

There is also another type of šatrovački, where the words are reconstructed by addition of letter P followed by the vowel preceding the inserted P after each syllable. In Macedonia, this type of speech is called papagalski (parrot speech). Since syllables usually end on a vowel that vowel is repeated after the inserted P as follows:

šapatropovapačkipi (ša+pa-tro+po-va+pa-čki+pi)

=== Examples ===
- dipizepel - dizel (diesel)
- bapacipi - baci (throw)
- nepemopoj - nemoj (don't)
- mapalopo - malo (some)
- brapatepe - brate (brother)
- cipigapan - cigan (gypsy)
- pepedeper - peder (homosexual)
- sepeljapak - seljak (peasant)
- papazipi - pazi (pay attention)
- krepetepen - kreten (idiot)

== See also ==
- Banjački, secret language in Bosnia and Serbia
- Meshterski, secret language in Bulgaria
- Back slang
- Pig Latin
- Verlan in France
- Vesre in Argentina and Uruguay
