= Sananmuunnos =

Finnish language wordplay

Sananmuunnos ("Word transformation"), sometimes kääntösana, is a sort of verbal play in the Finnish language, similar to spoonerisms in English.

Special to Finnish is a narrow phoneme inventory and vowel harmony. As Finnish is a mora-divided language, it is morae that are exchanged, not syllables (often a mora is also a syllable in a Finnish word, but not always). Also, Finnish inflectional and derivational morphology is extensive, thus applying a suffix from another word often produces a valid word. This leads to large number of possible spoonerisms. Much of practical sananmuunnos wordplay revolves around obscene double entendre expressed by spoonerism.

Several books have been written. Some have whole stories with multiple puns in one sentence, for example. Most have a "vocabulary" in the back, usually a hundred or more word pairs long.

== Processes ==
Initial morae of two adjacent words are exchanged, which is spoonerism by definition.

Mikkelin kittaajat ('chuggers of Mikkeli', a town in Finland) → kikkelin mittaajat ('measurers of weenie')

Johannes Virolainen (a Finnish politician) → vihannes jorolainen (vegetable from Joro)

The "extra length" of a long vowel is a full mora, and thus stays in its original position, making the new vowel long.

sanan muunnos [sa-nan mu-ːnnos] → [mu-nan sa-ːnnos] → munan saannos

If necessary, stilted diphthongs are converted into allowed diphthongs as per phonotactics. The first vowel is the determinant for choosing the diphthong. The process preserves opening and closing diphthongs, e.g. the opening 'ie' is reflected as an opening 'uo'.

vieno huntti [vi-eno hu-ntti] → [hu-eno vi-ntti] → huono vintti

If necessary, vowel harmony is applied. As per vowel harmony, the initial syllable controls the kind of vowel selected.

häipyvät tavut [hä-ipyvät ta-vut] → [ta-ipyvät hä-vut] → taipuvat hävyt

That is, transformation is A, U, O into Ä, Y, Ö, if the former do not begin the word. Notice that information may be lost in this step, making it irreversible.

== Exceptions ==
It is possible (although not accepted by some "orthodox") to exchange only the initial consonants, if that is the only way to get a sensible result. E.g. palasokeri [p-ala/s-okeri] 'sugar lump' → salapokeri [s-ala/p-okeri] 'playing poker in secret' (*solapakeri would not mean anything).

Typically presented, spoonerisms are a kind of double entendre. Appropriately, the very term sananmuunnos is one; it becomes munansaannos, which can be understood as "receiving/providing of sex".
