= Verlan =

French language game involving reversing syllables in a word

Verlan (pronounced [vɛʁlɑ̃]) is a type of argot in the French language, featuring inversion of syllables in a word, and is common in slang and youth language. It rests on a long French tradition of transposing syllables of individual words to create slang words. The word verlan itself is an example of verlan (making it an autological word). It is derived from inverting the sounds of the syllables in l'envers ([lɑ̃vɛʁ], 'the inverse', frequently used in the sense of "back-to-front"). The first documented use of verlan dates back to the 19th century, among robbers. Some verlan words, like meuf ('woman'), ouf ('crazy'), keuf ('cop'), relou ('irritating'), barjot ('crazy') and chelou ('weird') have entered common language and can be understood by most French speakers.

== Word formation ==
Words in verlan are formed by switching the order in which syllables from the original word are pronounced. For example, français [fʁɑ̃sɛ] becomes céfran [sefʁɑ̃].

Verlan generally retains the pronunciation of the original syllables. However, French words that end in a ⟨e⟩ muet (such as femme [fam]) and words that end in a pronounced consonant (such as flic [flik]) gain the sound [œ] once reversed. In addition, verlan often drops the final vowel sound after the word is inverted, so femme and flic become meuf ([mœf] – meufa in full form) and keuf ([kœf] – keufli in full form), respectively.

The study of written verlan is difficult as it is primarily passed down orally, without standardized spelling. While some still argue that the letters should be held over from the original word, in the case of verlan, most experts agree that words should be spelled as to best approximate pronunciation. For example, verlan is preferred to versl'en. The French author Auguste Le Breton uses numerous examples of verlan, for instance in Du rififi chez les hommes.

Different rules apply for one-syllable words, and words with more than two syllables may be verlan-ised in more than one way. For example, cigarette may yield garetsi or retsiga.

== Vocabulary ==
Some verlan words, such as meuf, have become so commonplace that they have been included in the Petit Larousse. The purpose of verlan is to create a somewhat secret language that only its speakers can understand. Words becoming mainstream is counterproductive. As a result, such newly common words may be reversed a second time.

Some verlan words, which are now well incorporated in common French language, have taken on their own significance, or at least certain connotations that have changed their meaning. For example, the word meuf, which can still be used to refer to any woman, also refers to the speaker's girlfriend when used in the possessive form (ma meuf → my girl); while the original word femme would refer to the speaker's wife when used in the same way (ma femme → my wife). Such words retain a cultural significance from the time at which they appeared in common language. Widespread in the second half of the 20th century, beur and beurette (from arabe) refer to people of northern African descent who live in France. The word rebeu (a double verlan) is much more recent, and evolved to refer more generally to people of Arab descent who live in France.

In theory, any word can be made into a verlan, but only a few expressions are used in everyday speech. Verbs translated into verlan cannot be conjugated easily. There is no such thing as a verlan grammar, so generally verbs are used in the infinitive, past participle or progressive form. For example:

- J'étais en train de pécho une bebon ("I was hitting on a hot chick") is said, but not je pécho[ais].

Here are some examples of French words that have been made into a verlan and their English meanings:

French	Verlan	English
arabe	beur	Arab
bête	teubé	stupid
bizarre	zarbi	weird
black (Eng.)	kebla	dark-skinned, African/black person
bloqué	kéblo	blocked
calibre	brelique	handgun
classe	secla	class
branché	chébran	trendy
cité	téci, tess	neighbourhood
cher	reuch	expensive
choper	pécho	pick up
défoncé	foncedé	high (on drugs)
discret	scred	discreet
disque	skeud	album
énervé	vénère	upset
fais chier	fais iech	it makes one angry
fête	teuf	party
femme	meuf	woman
flic	keuf	cop
fou	ouf	crazy
futur	turfu	future
français	céfran	French
frère	reuf	brother
herbe	beuh	weed
juif	feuj	Jew
jobard	barjot	crazy
laisse tomber	laisse béton	give up
l'envers	verlan	reverse
louche	chelou	shady or weird
lourd	relou	irritating or unbearable
maison	zonmé	house
mater	téma	gaze
merci	cimer	thanks
mère	reum	mother
métro	tromé	subway
moi	oim / wam	me
musique	zicmu	music
noir	renoi	Black person
père	reup	father
pourri	ripou	rotten (corrupt cop)
rap	peura	rap (music)
speed (Eng.)	deuspi	quick
tomber	béton	drop
toubab	babtou	White person
truc	keutru	stuff
vas-y	zyva	go for it

== Double verlan ==
Creating verlans often brings up words that are verlan of a verlan. This is sometimes called double verlan or veul. One can find the order of the consonants of the original word, but the vowels have been modified.

For example, meuf (verlan of femme) becomes feumeu. The verlan word beur, derived from arabe, has been made into rebeu.

== Cultural significance ==
Verlan is less a language than a way to set apart certain words. Many verlan words refer either to sex or drugs, related to the original purpose of keeping communication secret from institutions of social control. Verlan is generally limited to one or two key words per sentence. Verlan words and expressions are mixed within a more general argotique language.

Verlan is used by people to mark their membership in, or exclusion from, a particular group (generally young people in the cities and banlieues, although some French upper-class youth have also started using it as their slang); it is a tool for marking and delineating group identity. Speakers rarely create a verlan word on the fly; rather, their ability to use and understand words from an accepted set of known verlan terms allows them to be identified as part of a verlan-speaking group. Lefkowitz claims that the best speakers of the language are often the worst students, those most needing to hide from authority.

Some verlan words have gained mainstream currency. Examples of verlan in cultural mainstream include the 1984 comedy Les Ripoux (My New Partner) (ripou is verlan for pourri, or rotten, and refers to a corrupt policeman) and the 1977 hit "Laisse béton" by singer Renaud (béton is verlan for tomber and the phrase means "drop it").

Verlan is popular as a form of expression in French hip-hop. Artists claim that it fits well with the musical medium because "form ranks way over substance".

The stage name of Belgian pop artist and songwriter Stromae (real name Paul Van Haver) is verlan for maestro.

One hypothesis holds that Voltaire, the nom-de-plume of François-Marie Arouet, is a verlan word for Airvault.

The French language movie poster for the 2023 American film Barbie contains a line that has been interpreted as verlan: "Elle peut tout faire. Lui, c'est juste Ken", "She can do everything. He’s just Ken". By referring to the character Ken, which is a verlan phonological inversion of nique, a profane slang term for sex, aloud, it sounds like "Lui sait juste ken," meaning "he only knows how to fuck." Warner Bros. refused to confirm or deny whether the profane double entendre was intentional but appreciated the added publicity that the poster generated.

In the 2007 animated film Ratatouille, the character chef Auguste Gusteau's first name and last name are verlans of each other.

== See also ==
- Back slang
- Cockney
- Language game
- Louchébem
- Lunfardo, which has some reverse words
- Pig Latin
- Podaná
- Rhyming slang
- Riocontra (in Italian)
- Sananmuunnos (in Finnish)
- Šatrovački (in Serbo-Croatian)
- Shelta
- Totoiana (in Romanian)
- Tougo (in Japanese)
- Vesre (in Spanish)
