= Pig Latin =

Language game or cant

Pig Latin is a language game or cant in which words are altered by adding a fabricated suffix or by moving the onset or initial consonant or consonant cluster of a word to the end of the word and adding a vocalic syllable (usually -ay or /eɪ/) to create such a suffix. For example, in English, "she does not know" would become "eshay oesday otnay owknay".

The objective is often to conceal the words from others not familiar with the rules. The reference to Latin is a deliberate misnomer; Pig Latin is simply a form of argot or jargon unrelated to Latin, and the name is used for its English connotations as a strange and foreign-sounding language. It is most often used by young children as a way to confuse people unfamiliar with Pig Latin, such as adults.

Pig Latin exists in various languages across the world, e.g., Spanish vesre and French verlan.

== Origins and history ==
Early mentions of Pig Latin or Hog Latin describe what is known today as Dog Latin, a type of parody Latin. Examples of this predate even Shakespeare, whose 1598 play, Love's Labour's Lost, includes a reference to dog Latin.

Costard: Go to; thou hast it ad dungill, at the fingers' ends, as they say.
Holofernes: O, I smell false Latine; dunghill for unguem.

— Love's Labour's Lost, William Shakespeare

An 1866 article describes a "hog latin" that has some similarities to current Pig Latin. The article says, "He adds as many new letters as the boys in their 'hog latin', which is made use of to mystify eavesdroppers. A boy asking a friend to go with him says, 'Wig-ge you-ge go-ge wig-ge me-ge?' The other, replying in the negative says, 'Noge, Ige woge.'". This is similar to Língua do Pê.

Another early mention of the name was in Putnam's Magazine in May 1869: "I had plenty of ammunition in reserve, to say nothing, Tom, of our pig Latin. 'Hoggibus, piggibus et shotam damnabile grunto', and all that sort of thing", although the jargon is Dog Latin.

The Atlantic January 1895 also included a mention of the subject: "They all spoke a queer jargon which they themselves had invented. It was something like the well-known 'pig Latin' that all sorts of children like to play with."

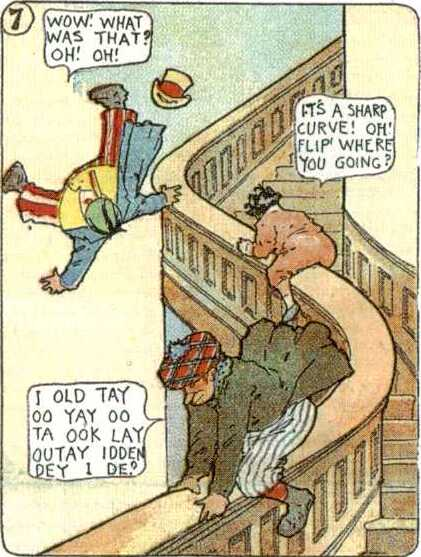
Nemo's friend "The Professor" speaks in Pig Latin in a 1909 Little Nemo comic strip.

The modern version of Pig Latin appears in a 1919 Columbia Records album by a singer named Arthur Fields. The song, called "Pig Latin Love", is followed by the subtitle "I-Yay Ove-Lay oo-yay earie-day". The Three Stooges used it on multiple occasions, most notably Tassels in the Air, a 1938 short where Moe Howard attempts to teach Curly Howard how to use it, thereby conveying the rules to the audience. In an earlier (1934) episode, Three Little Pigskins, Larry Fine attempts to impress a woman with his skill in Pig Latin, but it turns out that she knows it, too. No explanation of the rules is given. A few months prior in 1934, in the Our Gang short film Washee Ironee, Spanky tries to speak to an Asian boy by using Pig Latin.

Ginger Rogers sang a verse of "We're in the Money" in pig Latin in an elaborate Busby Berkeley production number in the film Gold Diggers of 1933. The film, the third highest grossing of that year, was inducted into the National Film Registry and that song included in the all-time top 100 movie songs by the American Film Institute. Merle Travis ends his song "When My Baby Double Talks To Me" with the phrase, "What a aybybay", where the last word is Pig Latin for "baby".

Anita O'Day (born Anita Belle Colton) used a stage name based on the Pig Latin of the word dough, a slang term for the money that she hoped to make.

A 1947 newspaper question and answer column describes the Pig Latin as known today. It describes moving the first letter to the end of a word and then adding "ay".

Two Pig Latin words that have entered mainstream American English are "ixnay" or "icksnay", the Pig Latin version of "nix" (itself a borrowing of German nichts), which is used as a general negative; and "amscray", Pig Latin for "scram", meaning "go away" or "get out of here".

== Rules ==
For words that begin with consonant sounds, the letter or letters that make up that sound are moved to the end of the word, then "ay" is added, as in the following examples:

- "pig" = "igpay"
- "latin" = "atinlay"
- "clown" = "ownclay"
- "banana" = "ananabay"

For words that begin with vowel sounds, "way" or "yay" is added to the end:

- "a" = "ayay/away"
- "open" = "openway/openyay"

== In other languages ==
In the German-speaking area, varieties of Pig Latin include Kedelkloppersprook, which originated around Hamburg harbour, and Mattenenglisch that was used in the Matte, the traditional working-class neighborhood of Bern. Though Mattenenglisch has fallen out of use since the mid-20th century, it is still cultivated by voluntary associations. A characteristic of the Mattenenglisch Pig Latin is the complete substitution of the first vowel by i, in addition to the usual moving of the initial consonant cluster and the adding of ee.

The Swedish equivalent of Pig Latin is Fikonspråket ("Fig language" – see Language game § List of common language games).

The Finnish version of Pig Latin is known as Kontinkieli ("container language"). After each word, the word kontti "container" is added, the first syllables are switched, so every sentence is converted to twice as many pseudo-words. For example, "wikipedia" ⟶ "wikipedia kontti" ⟶ "kokipedia wintti". Converting the sentence "I love you" ("Minä rakastan sinua") would result in "konä mintti kokastan rantti konua sintti".

In Italian, the alfabeto farfallino uses a similar encoding; in Spanish, a similar language variation is called Jeringonza. Spanish as used in Latin America has a further form, Vesre, in which the order of syllables is reversed. Some Italians also used a variation called riocontra.

In Estonian, the encoding used is 'bi' after the first syllable, e.g. "mina" ('me' in English) would be "mibina".

In Romanian, Pig Latin is called "păsărească" (i.e. "Bird-ian"). The encoding specifies adding "-pa", "-pe", "-pi", "-po", or "-pu" after each syllable, chosen to mirror the vowel in the last syllable. For example, "floare" would become "floaparepe".

Another equivalent of Pig Latin is used throughout the Slavic-speaking parts of the Balkans. It is called "Šatra" (/sha-tra/)or "Šatrovački" (/shatro-vachki/) and was used in crime-related and street language. For instance, the Balkan slang name for marijuana (trava – meaning "grass") turns to "vutra"; the Balkan slang name for cocaine (belo – meaning "white") turns to lobe, a pistol (pištolj) turns to štoljpi, bro (brate) turns to tebra. In the past few years it has become widely used between teenage immigrants in former Yugoslavian countries.

French has the loucherbem (or louchébem, or largonji) coded language, which supposedly was originally used by butchers (boucher in French). In loucherbem, the leading consonant cluster is moved to the end of the word (as in Pig Latin) and replaced by an L, and then a suffix is added at the end of the word (-oche, -em, -oque, etc., depending on the word). Example: combien (how much) = lombienquès. Similar coded languages are verlan and langue de feu (see Javanais). A few louchébem words have become usual French words: fou (crazy) = loufoque or louftingue, portefeuille (wallet) = larfeuille, en douce (on the quiet) = en loucedé.

Similarly, the French argot verlan, in which the order of the syllables within a word is inverted (e.g. jourbon for bonjour), is also widely used. The term "verlan" is an autological example of the process it describes, derived from inverting the syllables of l'envers, meaning "reverse". Documented initially in the 19th century, Verlan was used as a coded language by criminals in effort to conceal illicit activities from others, including police. Over time, particularly in the late 20th century, its use has proliferated in suburban areas predominantly inhabited by migrant workers. Verlan has served as a language bridge between many of these diverse communities, and its popularity encouraged its spread into advertising, film scripts, French rap and hip-hop music, media, and some French dictionaries. In some cases, Verlanned words have even supplanted their original forms.

One pig latin variant in Sinhala language is ගොං බාසාව where adults would use in front of children when they are talking grown-up stuff. The rule is to add ංගො after the first letter of the word. Examples include බංගොල්ලා for බල්ලා and ගොංගොං for ගොං. An alternative way to look at the rule is to prefix any word with ගොං which means stupid in Sinhala and then swap places the first letter of the word to encode with ගො. Usage of this has been observed in the west coast of Sri Lanka. Although the rule is very simple, two well seasoned adults talking in ගොං බාසාව can confuse children. Those children who inevitably get used to this would get the bragging rights and this becomes part of their coming of age story.

Similar to this, in some areas of Poland, adults would add a "Ka" sound before every syllable while speaking, to confuse children when talking about adult topics.
