= Vesre =

Secret language game

Vesre (from Spanish (al) revés 'reverse') is the reversing of the order of syllables within a word in Spanish. It is a feature of Rioplatense Spanish slang and Tango lyrics, and is associated with lunfardo. Since vesre is itself a reversed word, it can be considered an autological word.

Vesre is mostly from Buenos Aires, and other cities in Argentina have their own customs. Rosario has its "Rosarigasino" method for obfuscating words, and Córdoba has an entirely different set of colloquial conventions. Yet, most Argentines and Uruguayans have been exposed to vesre through tango lyrics or the media.

Even though vesre has spread to other countries, and can be heard in Peru, Chile and Ecuador, Spanish speakers outside the Río de la Plata area are usually less inclined to use it. Popular speech has created some instances; for example, natives of Barranquilla, Colombia often call their city Curramba, in a stylized form of vesre.

When the syllables of the noun are switched, the original gender - masculine or feminine - is kept; e.g., "un café -> un feca"

== Examples ==
Examples include:

- revés → vesre (reverse; backwards). "verre" is much more commonly used in Argentina, as in: "Nosotros hablamos al verre, ¿viste?" ("We speak wardsback, see?")
- café → feca (coffee) e.g., "¿Querés un feca?" (Would you like some coffee?")
- caballo → llobaca (horse)
- botella → llatebo (bottle)
- pelo → lope (hair)
- mujer → jermu (woman). In this case, argentinian people use it to refers to a wife, and not women. For example: "Ahí viene mi jermu" (My wife is coming).
- leche → chele (milk, used primarily to refer to semen)
- libro → broli (book) e.g., (usually plural) "¡Che, agarrá los brolis más seguido!" (Dude, get the books and learn something!)
- amigo → gomía (friend) e.g., "¡Eh!, ¡¿qué hacés gomía?!" (Hey! How goes it, my friend?!)
- doctor → tordo (doctor, usually meaning physician but also used for lawyers. "Tordo" is also the name in Argentina of the opportunistic shiny cowbird).
- carne → nerca (meat, not to be confused with "merca")
- pizza → zapi ("Zapi" even became the name of a pizza chain)
- maestro → troesma (master)

Occasionally, vesre is a stepping-stone towards further obfuscation, achieved by evolving into a longer word. For example:

- coche (car) → checo → checonato (after a once-famous sportsman named Cecconatto)
- cinco (the number five) → cocín → cocinero (literally cook; used mostly on the racetrack to mean "the five horse")

The original and vesre versions of a word are not always synonyms; sometimes the reversal adds some extra nuance to the meaning. For instance, the word hotel bears the same meaning as in English (i.e. a normal tourist hotel), whereas telo implies that the establishment is actually a love hotel.

These reversed words are only spoken; they are rarely found in writing.

== In other languages ==
- Colloquial French has a form of intentional metathesis known as verlan.
- Greek has Podaná with the same morphological construction.
- Serbian has a form of slang called Šatrovački followed in the 1990s with a more ambiguous slang called utrovački.
- Romanian has Totoiana with a similar morphological construction, spoken in the village of Totoi.
- Italian has riocontra featuring inversion of syllables, spoken in Milan and trancorio, spoken in the Mompiano neighborhood of Brescia.
- English has Pig Latin, with a similar morphological construction, moving the first consonant to the end of the word and following in with the suffix -ay.
