= Louchébem =

Secret language game

Louchébem or loucherbem (French pronunciation: [luʃebɛm]) is Parisian and Lyonnaise butchers' (French boucher) slang, similar to Pig Latin and Verlan. It originated in the mid-19th century and was in common use until the 1950s.

== Process ==
The louchébem word-creation process resembles that of largonji, verlan, and javanais, in that existing words are camouflaged according to a set of rules. Strictly speaking, louchébem is a more rigid variety of largonji in which the ending -èm is obligatory. Largonji substitutes ⟨l⟩ for the consonant or consonant cluster at the beginning of the word, or, if the word begins with an ⟨l⟩ or a vowel, the second syllable; the initial consonant is then reattached to the end of the word along with a suffix particular to the argot: -ji [ʒi], -oc [ɔk], -ic [ik], -uche [yʃ], -ès [ɛs], or in the case of louchébem, -em/ème [ɛm].

Note that louchébem is first and foremost an oral language, and spelling is usually phoneticized.

== History ==
Despite the name, louchébem seems to have been created not by butchers, but by inmates at Brest Prison, with records dating back to 1821.

Edmund Clerihew Bentley used the language as a plot point in his 1937 short story "The Old-Fashioned Apache".

During the Nazi occupation louchébem was used by Parisian members of the Resistance.

Even today, louchébem is still well-known and used among those working at point-of-sale in the meat retail industry. Some words have even leaked into common, everyday use by the masses; an example is the word loufoque, meaning "eccentric".

== Examples ==
Here are a few example Louchébem words.

English	French	Louchébem
slang	l'argot	largomuche
butcher	boucher	louchébem
customer	client	lienclès
coffeehouse	café	lafécaisse
(don't) understand	comprendre (pas)	lomprenquès (dans le lap)
woman (lady)	femme (dame)	lemmefé (lamdé)
blunder	gaffe	lafgué
boy/waiter	garçon	larçonguesse
Roma (ethnicity)	gitan	litjoc
leg (of mutton, etc.)	gigot	ligogem
insane	fou	louf; loufoque; louftingue
pork	porc	lorpic
mackerel	maquereau	lacromuche
Sir; Mister; gentleman	monsieur	lesieurmique
piece	morceau	lorsomique
overcoat	pardessus	lardeuss (lardeussupem)
excuse me?; sorry	pardon	lardonpem
to talk	parler	larlépem
manager	patron	latronpuche
tip	pourboire	lourboirpem
bag	sac	lacsé
expensive	cher	lerche; lerchem (often in the negative, as pas lerchem)
sneakily	en douce	en loucedé; en loucedoc
wallet	portefeuille	larfeuille; lortefeuillepem
thief, crook	filou	loufiah
knife	couteau	louteaucé

There is another French argot called largonji, which differs from louchébem only in the suffix that is added (-i instead of -em); the term is derived from jargon.

== Bibliography ==
- Marcel Schwob, Étude sur l’argot français. Paris: Émile Bouillon, 1889.
