= Podaná =

Greek argot

Podaná (Greek: ποδανά) is a Greek argot based on rearranging syllables, similar to Verlan and Vesre. Podaná itself is a reversal of anápoda (ανάποδα), meaning "upside-down."
