= Javanais =

Type of French slang

Javanais (French pronunciation: [ʒavanɛ], lit. 'Javanese (language)') is a type of French slang where the extra syllable ⟨av⟩ is infixed inside a word after every consonant that is followed by a vowel, in order to render it incomprehensible. Some common examples are gros ([ɡʁo], "fat") which becomes gravos ([ɡʁavo]); bonjour ([bɔ̃ʒuʁ], "hello"'), which becomes bavonjavour ([bavɔ̃ʒavuʁ]); and pénible ([penibl], "annoying"), becomes pavénaviblave ([pavenaviblav]). Paris ([paʁi]) becomes Pavaravis ([pavaʁavi]).

Javanais is determined by the production rule: CV → CavV. There are also many variations that can be made upon the same pattern such as: CabV, CalV, CanV, etc.

Around 1957, Boris Vian wrote a song La Java Javanaise. The lyrics are a didactical method to learn the javanais. Each verse is firstly articulated in regular French, then translated in slang. As the title suggests, the song is a Java, a Parisian dance craze. In 1962, Serge Gainsbourg wrote and sang a song called La Javanaise, a pun playing on Javanese dancing and the javanais style of speaking. The song heavily employs unaltered French words that naturally have an ⟨av⟩ sequence; thus the lyrics resemble the word game of javanais.

It is also possible to substitute other sounds in place of ⟨av⟩, with ⟨at⟩ and ⟨ab⟩ being the most popular. In addition to French, it may also be done in English. For example, the sentence "Today I decided to order some nice chocolates." would become "Tabodabay abi dabecabidabed tabo abordaber sabome nabice chabocabolabates." Since the language is intended to be incomprehensible to other listeners, it is usually spoken at a faster pace than normal, and code words are often used in place of simple words like 'yes' or 'no' which might otherwise help those listening catch on.

== See also ==
- Louchebem – a form of French slang similar to Pig Latin, originally called Largonji
- Verlan – the inversion of syllables in a French word
- Ubbi dubbi
