= Indigenous languages of the Americas =

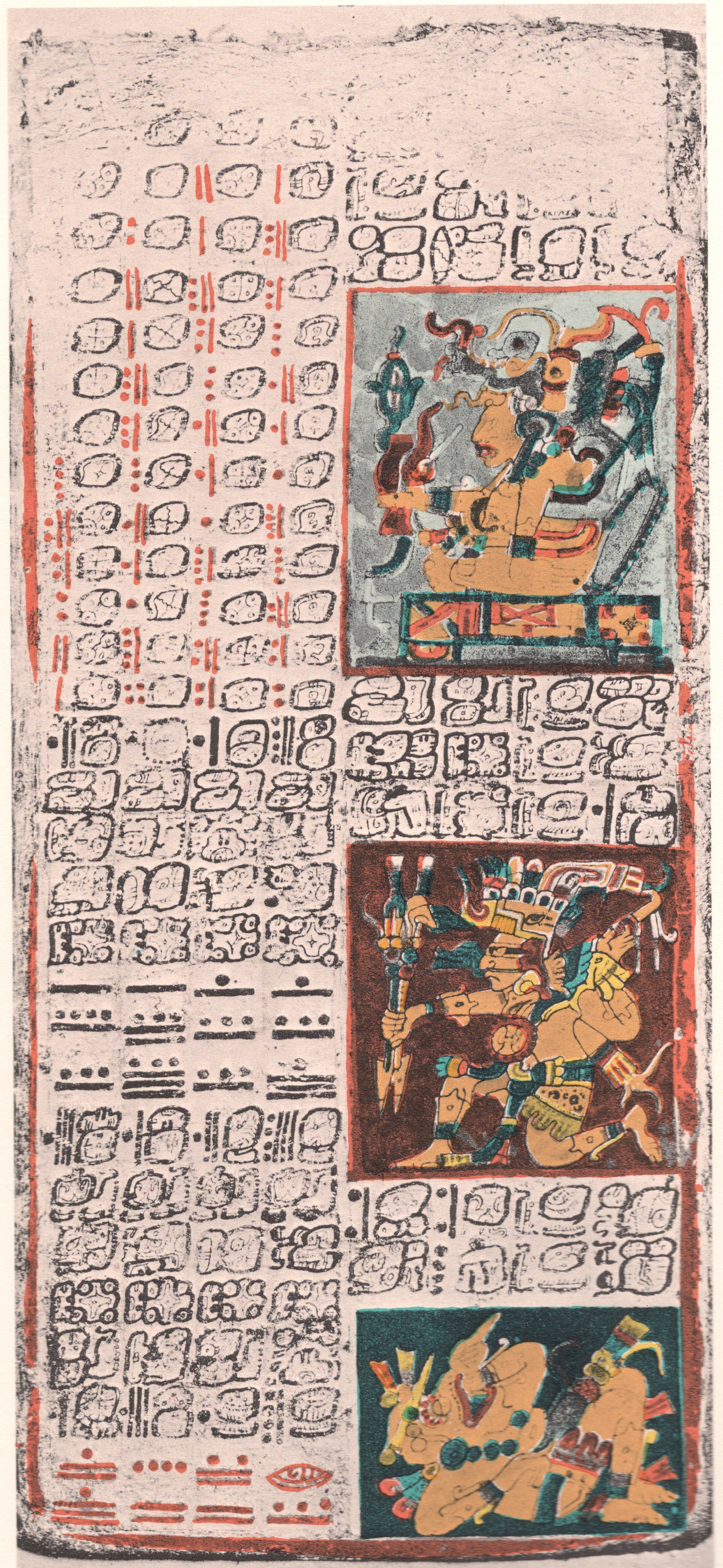
Yucatec Maya writing in the Dresden Codex, c.11–12th century, Chichen Itza

The indigenous languages of the Americas are the languages that were used by the Indigenous peoples of the Americas, before the arrival of Europeans. Over a thousand of these languages are still used in the 21st century, while many more are now extinct. The indigenous languages of the Americas are not all related to each other; instead, they are classified into over a hundred or so language families and isolates, as well as numerous extinct languages that are unclassified due to the lack of information on them.

Many proposals have been made to relate some or all of these languages to each other, with varying degrees of success. The most widely reported is Joseph Greenberg's Amerind hypothesis; however, nearly all specialists reject it because of severe methodological flaws; wrongly transcribed or spurious data; and a failure to distinguish cognation, contact, and coincidence.

According to UNESCO, most of the indigenous languages of the Americas are critically endangered, and many are dormant (without native speakers but with a community of heritage-language users) or entirely extinct. The most widely spoken indigenous languages are Southern Quechua (spoken primarily in southern Peru and Bolivia) and Guarani (centered in Paraguay, where it shares national language status with Spanish), with perhaps six or seven million speakers apiece (including many of European descent in the case of Guarani). Only half a dozen others have more than a million speakers; these are Aymara of Bolivia and Nahuatl of Mexico, with almost two million each; the Mayan languages Kekchi and K'iche' of Guatemala and Yucatec of Mexico, with about 1 million apiece; and perhaps one or two additional Quechuan languages in Peru and Ecuador. In the United States, 372,000 people reported speaking an indigenous language at home in the 2010 census. In Canada, 133,000 people reported speaking an Indigenous language at home in the 2011 census. In Greenland, about 90% of the population speaks Greenlandic, the most widely spoken Eskaleut language.

== Background ==
Over a thousand known languages were spoken by various peoples in North and South America prior to their first contact with Europeans. These encounters occurred between the beginning of the 11th century (with the Norse settlements in Greenland and failed efforts in Newfoundland and Labrador) and the end of the 15th century (the voyages of Christopher Columbus). Several indigenous cultures of the Americas had also developed their own writing systems, the best known being the Maya script. The indigenous languages had widely varying demographics, from the Quechuan languages, Aymara, Guarani, and Nahuatl, which had millions of active speakers, to many languages with only several hundred speakers. After pre-Columbian times, several indigenous creole languages developed in the Americas, based on European, indigenous and African languages.

The European colonizing nations and their successor states had widely varying attitudes towards Native American languages. In Brazil, friars learned and promoted the Tupi language. In many Spanish colonies, Spanish missionaries often learned local languages and culture in order to preach to the natives in their own tongue and relate the Christian message to their indigenous religions. In the British American colonies, John Eliot of the Massachusetts Bay Colony made a Bible translation in the Massachusett language, also called Wampanoag, or Natick (1661–1663); it was the first Bible printed in North America, the Eliot Indian Bible.

The Europeans also suppressed use of indigenous languages, establishing their own languages for official communications, destroying texts in other languages, and insisted that indigenous people learn European languages in schools. As a result, indigenous languages suffered from cultural suppression and loss of speakers. By the 18th and 19th centuries, Spanish, English, Portuguese, French, and Dutch, brought to the Americas by European settlers and administrators, had become the official or national languages of modern nation-states of the Americas.

Many indigenous languages have become critically endangered, but others are vigorous and part of daily life for millions of people. Several have been given official status in the countries where they occur, such as Guarani in Paraguay. In other cases official status is limited to certain regions where the languages are most spoken. Although sometimes enshrined in constitutions as official, the languages may be used infrequently in de facto official use. Examples are Quechua in Peru and Aymara in Bolivia, where in practice, Spanish is dominant in all formal contexts.

In the North American Arctic region, Greenland in 2009 elected Kalaallisut as its sole official language. In the United States, the Navajo language is the most spoken Native American language, with more than 200,000 speakers in the Southwestern United States. The US Marine Corps recruited Navajo men, who were established as code talkers during World War II.

== Origins ==
In American Indian Languages: The Historical Linguistics of Native America (1997), Lyle Campbell lists several hypotheses for the historical origins of Amerindian languages.

- A single, one-language migration (not widely accepted)
- A few linguistically distinct migrations (favored by Edward Sapir)
- Multiple migrations
- Multilingual migrations (single migration with multiple languages)
- The influx of already diversified but related languages from the Old World
- Extinction of Old World linguistic relatives (while the New World ones survived)
- Migration along the Pacific coast instead of by the Bering Strait

Roger Blench (2008) has advocated the theory of multiple migrations along the Pacific coast of peoples from northeastern Asia, who already spoke diverse languages. These proliferated in the Americas.

== Numbers of speakers and political recognition ==
Countries like Mexico, Guatemala, and Guyana recognize most indigenous languages. Bolivia and Venezuela give all indigenous languages official status. Canada, Argentina, and the US allow provinces and states to decide. Brazil limits recognition to localities. Colombia delegates indigenous language recognition to its departments according to the Colombian Constitution of 1991. In Canada, Bill C-91: the Indigenous Languages Act passed in 2019, and supports indigenous languages through sustainable funding and the Office of the Commissioner of Indigenous Languages. The first Commissioner of Indigenous Languages in Canada is Ronald E. Ignace.

In the following table, languages marked with asterisks (*) have minority status. Political entities bestowing official language status are highlighted in bold. International and unrecognized organizations are in italics.

Widely-spoken and officially-recognized indigenous languages
Language	Language family	Number of speakers	Official recognition	Geographic distribution	Source
Guarani	Tupian	6,500,000	**Paraguay**; **Bolivia**; Corrientes, Argentina; Tacuru, Mato Grosso do Sul, Brazil; **Mercosur**	Paraguay, Bolivia, Argentina, Brazil	
Southern Quechua	Quechuan	5,000,000 (outdated)	**Bolivia**; **Peru**; Jujuy, Argentina; Chile*; **Comunidad Andina**	Bolivia, Peru, Argentina, Chile	
Nahuatl	Uto-Aztecan	1,700,000	Mexico	Mexico	
Aymara	Aymaran	1,700,000	**Bolivia**; **Peru**; Chile*; **Comunidad Andina**	Bolivia, Peru, Chile	
Q'eqchi'	Mayan	1,100,000	Guatemala; Belize; Mexico	Guatemala, Belize, Mexico	
K'iche'	Mayan	1,100,000	Guatemala; Mexico	Guatemala, Mexico	
Yucatec Maya	Mayan	890,000	Mexico; Belize	Mexico, Belize	
Ancash Quechua	Quechuan	700,000 (outdated)		Peru	
Mam	Mayan	600,000	Guatemala; Mexico; **Zapatista Autonomous Municipalities** (de facto)	Guatemala, Mexico	
Tzeltal	Mayan	560,000	Mexico; **Zapatista Autonomous Municipalities** (de facto)	Mexico	
Mixtec	Oto-Manguean	520,000	Mexico	Mexico	
Tzotzil	Mayan	490,000	Mexico; **Zapatista Autonomous Municipalities** (de facto)	Mexico	
Zapotec	Oto-Manguean	480,000	Mexico	Mexico	
Kichwa	Quechuan	450,000	**Ecuador**; Colombia (Cauca, Nariño, Putumayo)	Ecuador, Colombia (Cauca, Nariño, Putumayo)	
Wayuu	Arawakan	420,000	**Venezuela**; La Guajira, Colombia	Venezuela, Colombia	
Kaqchikel	Mayan	410,000	Guatemala; Mexico	Guatemala, Mexico	
Otomi	Oto-Manguean	310,000	Mexico	Mexico	
Totonac	Totonacan	270,000	Mexico	Mexico	
Mapuche	Araucanian	260,000	Cautín, Araucanía, Chile (**Galvarino** and **Padre Las Casas**)	Cautín, Araucanía, Chile and Argentina	
Ch'ol	Mayan	250,000	Mexico; **Zapatista Autonomous Municipalities** (de facto)	Mexico	
Mazateco	Oto-Manguean	240,000	Mexico	Mexico	
Q'anjob'al	Mayan	170,000	Guatemala; Mexico	Guatemala, Mexico	
Huasteco	Mayan	170,000	Mexico	Mexico	
Navajo	Na-Dené	170,000	**Navajo Nation**, United States	Southwestern US	
Mazahua	Oto-Manguean	150,000	Mexico	Mexico	
Miskito	Misumalpan	140,000 (outdated)	**North Caribbean Coast Autonomous Region**, Nicaragua; Gracias a Dios, Honduras	Nicaragua, Honduras	
Chinanteco	Oto-Manguean	140,000	Mexico	Mexico	
Mixe	Mixe-Zoque	130,000	Mexico	Mexico	
Tlapaneco	Oto-Manguean	130,000	Mexico	Mexico	
Poqomchi'	Mayan	130,000	Guatemala	Guatemala	
Purepecha	Purépecha	120,000	Mexico	Mexico	
Achí	Mayan	120,000	Guatemala	Guatemala	
Ixil	Mayan	120,000	Guatemala; Mexico	Guatemala, Mexico	
Yaru Quechua	Quechuan	100,000 (outdated)		Peru	
Cree	Algic	96,000 (including Naskapi and Montagnais)	Canada: **Northwest Territories**; Alberta*; Manitoba*; Ontario*; Quebec*; Saskatchewan*	Canada	
Tarahumara	Uto-Aztecan	74,000	Mexico	Mexico	
Emberá Darién	Chocoan	72,000	Panamá and Chocó	Panamá and Chocó	
Tz'utujil	Mayan	72,000	Guatemala	Guatemala	
Guna	Chibchan	61,000	Colombia (Chocó and Antioquia)	Colombia (Chocó, Antioquia), Panama (Guna Yala)	
Páez (Nasa Yuwe)	Nasa	60,000	Colombia (Cauca, Huila, Valle del Cauca)	Colombia (Cauca, Huila, Valle del Cauca)	
Chuj	Mayan	59,000	Guatemala; Mexico	Guatemala, Mexico	
Kalaallisut (Greenlandic)	Eskaleut	57,000	**Greenland**	Greenland	
Amuzgo	Oto-Manguean	55,588	Mexico	Mexico	
Tojolab'al	Mayan	51,733	Mexico; **Zapatista Autonomous Municipalities** (de facto)	Mexico	
Garifuna	Arawakan	50,000 (circa; outdated)	Guatemala; Belize; **North Caribbean Coast Autonomous Region**, Nicaragua; Honduras (Atlántida, Colón, Gracias a Dios)	Guatemala, Belize, Nicaragua, Honduras; formerly the Caribbean	
Ojibwe	Algic	48,000	Canada; United States	Canada, United States	
Tikuna	Ticuna–Yuri	47,000	**Amazonas**, Brazil; Colombia (Leticia and Puerto Nariño, Amazonas)		
Chatino	Oto-Manguean	45,000	Mexico	Mexico	
Huichol	Uto-Aztecan	44,800	Mexico	Mexico	
Mayo	Uto-Aztecan	39,600	Mexico	Mexico	
Inuktitut	Eskaleut	39,475	**Nunavut**; **Northwest Territories**; Nunavik*, Quebec; Nunatsiavut*, Newfoundland and Labrador; Inuvialuit Settlement Region*, Yukon and NWT	Canada (Nunavut, Northwest Territories, Quebec, Labrador)	
Chontal Maya	Mayan	37,072	Mexico	Mexico	
Wichi	Mataguayan	36,135	**Chaco**, Argentina	Chaco Province, Argentina	
Tepehuán	Uto-Aztecan	36,000	Mexico	Mexico	
Soteapanec	Mixe-Zoque	35,050	Mexico	Mexico	
Shuar	Chicham	35,000	**Ecuador**	Ecuador	
Sikuani	Guahiban	34,000	Colombia (Meta, Vichada, Arauca, Guainía, Guaviare)	Colombia (Meta, Vichada, Arauca, Guainía, Guaviare)	
Jakaltek	Mayan	33,000	Guatemala; Mexico	Guatemala, Mexico	
Qom	Guaicuruan	31,580	**Chaco**, Argentina	Chaco Province, Argentina	
Poqomam	Mayan	30,000	Guatemala	Guatemala	
Ch'orti'	Mayan	30,000	Guatemala	Guatemala	
Kaiwá	Tupian	26,500		Mato Grosso do Sul, Brazil	
Sioux	Siouan	25,000	**South Dakota**, United States	US	
O'odham	Uto-Aztecan	23,313	Tohono Oʼodham Nation, US; Salt River Pima–Maricopa Indian Community, US; Mexico	Arizona, United States	
Kaingang	Jê	22,000		Brazil	
Nam Trik	Barbacoan	21,000	Cauca, Colombia	Cauca, Colombia	
Cora	Uto-Aztecan	20,100	Mexico	Mexico	
Yanomamö	Yanomaman	20,000	**Venezuela**; **Amazonas**, Brazil	Brazil, Venezuela	
Nheengatu	Tupian	19,000	**São Gabriel da Cachoeira**, **Amazonas**, Brazil; **Venezuela**	Brazil, Colombia, Venezuela	
Yup'ik (Central Alaskan) and Yupik (Siberian)	Eskaleut	18,626	**Alaska**, United States	Alaska, United States	
Huave	Huave	17,900	Mexico	Mexico	
Yaqui	Uto-Aztecan	17,546	Mexico	Mexico	
Piaroa	Piaroa–Saliban	17,000	Vichada, Colombia	Vichada, Colombia	
Emberá Catío	Chocoan	15,000	Colombia (Chocó and Antioquia)	Colombia (Chocó and Antioquia)	
Sakapultek	Mayan	15,000	Guatemala	Guatemala	
Western Apache	Na-Dené	14,012	San Carlos Apache Nation, US; Fort Apache Indian Reservation, US	Arizona, United States	
Nivaclé	Mataguayan	14,000		Paraguay (Chaco Region), Argentina (Salta Province)	
Xavante	Jê	13,300		Mato Grosso, Brazil	
Keresan	Keresan	13,073		New Mexico, United States	
Cuicatec	Oto-Manguean	13,000	Mexico	Mexico	
Awa Pit	Barbacoan	13,000	Nariño, Colombia	Nariño, Colombia	
Karu	Arawakan	12,000	**Venezuela**; Guaviare Department, Colombia; **São Gabriel da Cachoeira**, Amazonas, Brazil	Guaviare, Colombia and Amazonas, Brazil	
Awakatek	Mayan	11,607	Guatemala; Mexico	Guatemala, Mexico	
Chipewyan	Na-Dené	11,325	**Northwest Territories**, Canada	Northwest Territories, Canada	
Pame	Oto-Manguean	11,000	Mexico	Mexico	
Wounaan	Chocoan	10,800	Colombia (Chocó, Cauca, Valle del Cauca)	Colombia (Chocó, Cauca, Valle del Cauca)	
Moxo	Arawakan	10,000	**Bolivia**	Bolivia	
Kogi	Chibchan	9,900	Magdalena, Colombia	Magdalena, Colombia	
Zuni	Zuni	9,620		New Mexico, United States	
Choctaw	Muskogean	9,600	Choctaw Nation of Oklahoma	Oklahoma and Mississippi, United States	
Guajajara	Tupian	9,500		Maranhão, Brazil	
Sumo	Misumalpan	9,000	**North Caribbean Coast Autonomous Region**, Nicaragua	North Caribbean Coast Autonomous Region, Nicaragua	
Mopán	Mayan	9,000–12,000	Guatemala; Belize	Guatemala, Belize	
Tepehua	Totonacan	8,900	Mexico	Mexico	
Mawé	Tupian	8,900		Brazil (Pará and Amazonas)	
Terêna	Arawakan	8,200		Mato Grosso do Sul, Brazil	
Sipakapense	Mayan	8,000	Guatemala	Guatemala	
Ika	Chibchan	8,000	Colombia (Cesar and Magdalena)	Colombia (Cesar and Magdalena)	
Emberá Chamí	Chocoan	7,800	Colombia (Chocó and Risaralda)	Colombia (Chocó and Risaralda)	
Mi'kmaq	Algic	7,140		Canada and United States	
Tukano	Tucanoan	7,100	**São Gabriel da Cachoeira**, **Amazonas**, Brazil; **Mitú**, Vaupés, Colombia	Amazonas, Brazil and Vaupés, Colombia	
Minica Huitoto	Witotoan	6,800	Amazonas, Colombia	Amazonas, Colombia	
Hopi	Uto-Aztecan	6,780		Arizona, United States	
Enlhet	Mascoian	6,400		Presidente Hayes, Paraguay	
Piapoco	Arawakan	6,400	Colombia (Guainía, Vichada, Meta)	Colombia (Guainía, Vichada, Meta)	
Cubeo	Tucanoan	6,300	Vaupés, Colombia	Vaupés, Colombia	
Mawé	Tupian	6,219	**Amazonas**, Brazil		
Kayapo	Jê	6,200		Brazil (Pará and Mato Grosso)	
Yukpa	Cariban	6,000	**Venezuela**; Cesar, Colombia	Venezuela, Colombia	
Chiquitano	Chiquitano	5,900	Bolivia	Brazil and Bolivia	
Guarayu	Tupian	5,900	Bolivia	Bolivia	
Macushi	Cariban	5,800	Venezuela; Guyana	Brazil, Venezuela, Guyana	
Baniwa of Içana	Arawakan	5,811	**Amazonas**, Brazil		
Mosetén–Chimane	Mosetén–Chimane	5,300	Bolivia	Bolivia	
Tewa	Tanoan	5,123		New Mexico, United States	
Timbira	Jê	5,100		Brazil (Maranhão, Tocantins, Pará)	
Sanumá	Yanomaman	5,100	**Venezuela**	Brazil and Venezuela	
Muscogee	Muskogean	5,072	**Muscogee (Creek) Nation**, Oklahoma, US	United States (Oklahoma, Alabama, Florida)	
Chontal of Oaxaca	Tequistlatecan	5,039	Mexico	Oaxaca, Mexico	
Emberá Baudó	Chocoan	5,000	Colombia (Chocó)	Colombia (Chocó)	
Tektitek	Mayan	5,000	Guatemala	Guatemala	
Barí	Chibchan	5,000	Colombia (Cesar and Norte de Santander)	Colombia (Cesar and Norte de Santander)	
Blackfoot	Algic	4,700		Alberta, Canada and Montana, United States	
Camsá	Camsá	4,000	Putumayo, Colombia	Putumayo, Colombia	
Kulina	Arawan	3,900		Brazil (Amazonas) and Peru	
Crow	Siouan	3,862		Montana, United States	
Mohawk	Iroquoian	3,875	**Mohawk Nation of Akwesasne**, Canada	Canada (Ontario and Quebec) and United States (New York)	
Eperara	Chocoan	3,600	Colombia (Cauca, Nariño, Putumayo), Panama	Colombia (Cauca, Nariño, Putumayo), Panama	
Kashinawa	Panoan	3,588		Brazil and Peru	
Munduruku	Tupian	3,563		Pará and Amazonas, Brazil	
Tunebo/Uwa	Chibchan	3,550	Boyacá, Colombia	Boyacá, Colombia	
Ayoreo	Zamucoan	3,160	**Bolivia**	Bolivia, Paraguay	
Desano	Tucanoan	3,160	**Amazonas**, Brazil		
Wapishana	Arawakan	3,154	**Bonfim**, Roraima, Brazil; Guyana	Bonfim, Roraima, Brazil, and Guyana	
Yaminawa	Panoan	3,129	**Bolivia**	Bolivia	
Mocoví	Guaicuruan	3,000	**Chaco**, Argentina	Chaco, Argentina	
Iñupiaq	Eskaleut	3,000	**Alaska**, US; **Northwest Territories**, Canada	Alaska, US and Northwest Territories, Canada	
Puinave	Puinave	3,000	Guainía, Colombia; **Venezuela**	Guainía, Colombia and Venezuela	
Cuiba	Guahiban	2,900	Colombia (Casanare, Vichada, Arauca Departments)	Colombia (Casanare, Vichada, Arauca)	
Tupi-Mondé	Tupian	2,886		Rondônia, Brazil	
Yuracaré	Yuracaré	2,700	**Bolivia**	Bolivia	
Wanano	Tucanoan	2,600	Vaupés, Colombia	Vaupés, Colombia	
Shoshoni	Uto-Aztecan	2,512		US	
Bora	Boran	2,400	Amazonas, Colombia	Amazonas, Colombia	
Cofán	Cofán	2,400	Colombia (Nariño, Putumayo)	Colombia (Nariño, Putumayo)	
Kanamari	Harákmbut–Katukinan	2,298	**Amazonas**, Brazil		
Fox (Mesquakie-Sauk-Kickapoo)	Algic	2,288	Sac and Fox Nation, United States; Mexico	US and Mexico	
Cherokee	Iroquoian	2,320	Eastern Band of Cherokee Indians, North Carolina, US; Cherokee Nation of Oklahoma, US	US (Oklahoma and North Carolina)	
Waiwai	Cariban	2,217	**Amazonas**, Brazil; Guyana		
Karajá	Jê	2,137		Brazil	
Huarijio	Uto-Aztecan	2,136	Mexico	Mexico	
Slavey	Na-Dené	2,120	**Northwest Territories**, Canada	Northwest Territories, Canada	
Chichimeca	Oto-Manguean	2,100	Mexico	Mexico	
Koreguaje	Tucanoan	2,100	Caquetá, Colombia	Caquetá, Colombia	
Tiriyó	Cariban	2,100		Brazil, Suriname	
Xerente	Jê	2,051		Tocantins, Brazil	
Uspanteko	Mayan	2,000	Guatemala	Guatemala	
Apurinã	Arawakan	2,000	**Amazonas**, Brazil		
Wari'	Chapacuran	1,854		Rondônia, Brazil	
Wiwa	Chibchan	1,850	Cesar, Colombia	Cesar, Colombia	
Weenhayek	Mataguayan	1,810	**Bolivia**	Bolivia	
Matlatzinca	Oto-Manguean	1,800	Mexico	Mexico	
Tacana	Tacanan	1,800	**Bolivia**	Bolivia	
Tłįchǫ	Na-Dené	1,735	**Northwest Territories**, Canada	Northwest Territories, Canada	
Cavineña	Tacanan	1,700	**Bolivia**	Bolivia	
Jupda	Nadahup	1,700	Amazonas, Colombia	Amazonas, Colombia	
Zacatepec Mixtec	Oto-Manguean	1,500	Mexico	Mexico	
Matsés	Pano-Tacanan	1,500	**Amazonas**, Brazil		
Seneca	Iroquoian	1,453	Six Nations of the Grand River First Nation, Ontario, Canada	Ontario, Canada	
Movima	Movima	1,400	**Bolivia**	Bolivia	
Tlingit	Na-Dené	1,360	**Alaska**, United States	Alaska, United States	
Inuinnaqtun	Eskaleut	1,310	**Nunavut**, Canada; **Northwest Territories**, Canada	Alaska, United States, and Northwest Territories and Nunavut, Canada	
Kiowa	Tanoan	1,274		Oklahoma, United States	
Marúbo	Pano-Tacanan	1,252	**Amazonas**, Brazil		
Ka'apor	Tupian	1,241		Maranhão, Brazil	
Aleut	Eskaleut	1,236	**Alaska**, United States	Alaska, United States	
Gwich'in	Na-Dené	1,217	**Alaska**, United States; **Northwest Territories**, Canada	Alaska, US and Northwest Territories, Canada	
Inuvialuktun	Eskaleut	1,150	**Nunavut**, Canada; **Northwest Territories**, Canada	Nunavut and Northwest Territories, Canada	
Waimiri-Atroarí	Cariban	1,120	**Amazonas**, Brazil		
Arapaho	Algic	1,087		US	
Macuna	Tucanoan	1,032	Vaupés, Colombia	Vaupés, Colombia	
Guayabero	Guahiban	1,000	Colombia (Meta, Guaviare)	Colombia (Meta, Guaviare)	
Chocho	Oto-Manguean	810	Mexico	Mexico	
Maricopa/Piipaash	Yuman–Cochimí	800	Salt River Pima–Maricopa Indian Community, Arizona, United States	Arizona, United States	
Rama	Chibchan	740	**North Caribbean Coast Autonomous Region**, Nicaragua	North Caribbean Coast Autonomous Region, Nicaragua	
Seri	Seri	729	Mexico	Mexico	
Ese Ejja	Tacanan	700	**Bolivia**	Bolivia	
Nukak	Nukak-Kakua	700	Guaviare, Colombia	Guaviare, Colombia	
Pima Bajo	Uto-Aztecan	650	Mexico	Mexico	
Cayuvava	Cayubaba	650	**Bolivia**	Bolivia	
Chácobo-Pakawara	Panoan	600	**Bolivia**	Bolivia	
Lacandon	Mayan	600	Mexico	Mexico	
Oneida	Iroquoian	574	Six Nations of the Grand River First Nation, Ontario, Canada; Oneida Nation of the Thames, Ontario, Canada	Ontario, Canada	
Cocopah	Yuman–Cochimí	515	Mexico	Mexico	
Sirionó	Tupian	500	**Bolivia**	Bolivia	
Yatê	Yatê	500		Pernambuco, Brazil	
Siona	Tucanoan	500	Putumayo, Colombia	Putumayo, Colombia	
Havasupai–Hualapai	Yuman–Cochimí	445	Havasupai Indian Reservation, Arizona, United States	Arizona, United States	
Kumeyaay	Yuman–Cochimí	427 (525 including Ipai and Tiipai languages)	Mexico; Sycuan Band of the Kumeyaay Nation, California, US (ballot recognition)*	Baja California, Mexico and California, US	
Tembé	Tupian	420		Maranhão, Brazil	
Yurok	Algic	414		California, United States	
Alutiiq (Sugpiaq)	Eskaleut	400	**Alaska**, United States	Alaska, United States	
Tatuyo	Tucanoan	400	Vaupés, Colombia	Vaupés, Colombia	
Mura	Muran	389	**Amazonas**, Brazil		
Andoque	Andoque	370	Caquetá, Colombia	Caquetá, Colombia	
Guajá	Tupian	365		Maranhão, Brazil	
Chimila	Chibchan	350	Magdalena, Colombia	Magdalena, Colombia	
Matis	Pano-Tacanan	322	**Amazonas**, Brazil		
Koyukon	Na-Dené	300	**Alaska**, United States	Alaska, United States	
Hitnü	Guahiban	300	Arauca, Colombia	Arauca, Colombia	
Mikasuki	Muskogean	290		Florida, United States (Georgia, Alabama, and Oklahoma (historical))	
Quechan	Yuman–Cochimí	290	Imperial County, California, United States (ballot recognition)* Yuma County, Arizona, United States (ballot recognition)*	California, Arizona	
Cabiyari	Arawakan	270	Colombia (Mirití-Paraná and Amazonas)	Colombia (Mirití-Paraná and Amazonas)	
Reyesano	Tacanan	250	**Bolivia**	Bolivia	
Achagua	Arawakan	250	Meta, Colombia	Meta, Colombia	
Kakwa	Nukak-Kakua	250	Vaupés, Colombia	Vaupés, Colombia	
Yavapai	Yuman–Cochimí	245		Arizona, United States	
Siriano	Tucanoan	220	Vaupés, Colombia	Vaupés, Colombia	
Mojave	Yuman–Cochimí	200		Arizona, United States	
Paipai	Yuman–Cochimí	200	Mexico	Mexico	
Toromono	Tacanan	200	**Bolivia**	Bolivia	
Ixcatec	Oto-Manguean	190	Mexico	Mexico	
Ocaina	Witotoan	190	Amazonas, Colombia	Amazonas, Colombia	
Haida	Haida	168	**Alaska**, United States; **Council of the Haida Nation**, Canada	Alaska, United States and British Columbia, Canada	
Muinane	Boran	150	Amazonas, Colombia	Amazonas, Colombia	
Deg Xinag	Na-Dené	127	**Alaska**, United States	Alaska, United States	
Warázu	Tupian	125	**Bolivia**	Bolivia	
Araona	Tacanan	110	**Bolivia**	Bolivia	
Tariana	Arawakan	100	**Amazonas**, Brazil		
Upper Tanana	Na-Dené	100	**Alaska**, United States	Alaska, United States	
Itene	Chapacuran	90	**Bolivia**	Bolivia	
Ahtna	Na-Dené	80	**Alaska**, United States	Alaska, United States	
Totoró	Barbacoan	76	Colombia (Cauca)	Colombia (Cauca)	
Tsimshian	Tsimshianic	70	**Alaska**, United States	Alaska, United States	
Tanacross	Na-Dené	65	**Alaska**, United States	Alaska, United States	
Cayuga	Iroquoian	61	Six Nations of the Grand River First Nation, Ontario, Canada; Cattaraugus Reservation, New York, US	Ontario, Canada and New York, US	
Zenú	Chocoan	60	Córdoba, Colombia	Córdoba, Colombia	
Dena'ina	Na-Dené	50	**Alaska**, United States	Alaska, United States	
Onondaga	Iroquoian	50	Six Nations of the Grand River First Nation, Ontario, Canada	Ontario, Canada	
Bauré	Arawakan	40	**Bolivia**	Bolivia	
Upper Kuskokwim	Na-Dené	40	**Alaska**, United States	Alaska, United States	
Tanana	Na-Dené	30	**Alaska**, United States	Alaska, United States	
Ayapaneco	Mixe-Zoque	24	Mexico	Mexico	
Leco	Leco	20	**Bolivia**	Bolivia	
Yupiltepeque Xinca	Xincan	0	Guatemala	Guatemala	
Guazacapán Xinca	Xincan	2 semispeakers	Guatemala	Guatemala	
Jumaytepeque Xinca	Xincan	1 (L2)	Guatemala	Guatemala	
Chiquimulilla Xinca	Xincan	0	Guatemala	Guatemala	
Sinacantán Xinca	Xincan	0	Guatemala	Guatemala	
Hän	Na-Dené	12	**Alaska**, United States	Alaska, United States	
Holikachuk	Na-Dené	12	**Alaska**, United States	Alaska, United States	
Kallawaya	Quechuan	10-20 (L2)	**Bolivia**		
Comanche	Uto-Aztecan	9		United States	
Carijona	Cariban	6	Colombia (Amazonas, Guaviare)	Colombia (Amazonas, Guaviare)	
Kiliwa	Yuman–Cochimí	4	Mexico	Mexico	
Selk'nam	Chonan	1 (L2)		Tierra del Fuego, Chile and Argentina (extinct)	
Cochimí	Yuman–Cochimí	0	**Mexico** (extinct, but retains recognition)		
Dzubukuá	Kariri	0	**Crateús**, Ceará, Brazil (under revival)		
Eyak	Na-Dené	0	**Alaska**, United States (extinct, but retains recognition)		
Itonama	Itonama	0	**Bolivia**	Bolivia	
Mokaná	Malibú	0	Colombia (Atlántico)	Colombia (Atlántico)	
Nonuya	Witotoan	0	Amazonas, Colombia	Colombia, Peru	
Pasto	Barbacoan	0	Nariño, Colombia	Nariño, Colombia	
Pijao	Cariban	0	Colombia (Tolima, Huila, Cundinamarca)	Colombia (Tolima, Huila, Cundinamarca)	
Puquina	Puquina	0	**Bolivia** (extinct, but retains recognition)	Department of Puno, Peru	
Taíno	Arawakan	0		Formerly most of the Caribbean	
Tuscarora	Iroquoian	0	Six Nations of the Grand River First Nation, Ontario, Canada; Tuscarora Reservation, New York, US	Ontario, Canada, and New York, US	
Yahgan	Yahgan	0		Tierra del Fuego, Chile and Argentina (extinct)	

== Language families and unclassified languages ==
=== Notes ===
- Extinct languages or families are indicated by: †.
- The number of family members is indicated in parentheses (for example, Arauan (9) means the Arauan family consists of nine languages).
- For convenience, the following list of language families is divided into three sections based on political boundaries of countries. These sections correspond roughly with the geographic regions (North, Central, and South America) but are not equivalent. This division cannot fully delineate indigenous culture areas.

=== Northern America ===
Indigenous languages of North America
- (geographic)
- Geographic distribution: North America
- Ethnicity: Indigenous peoples of North America
- Linguistic classification: Not a family
- Subdivisions: 54 distinct families

Language codes
- ISO 639-2 / 5: nai
- Glottolog: None
- Pre-contact distribution of North American language families, including northern Mexico

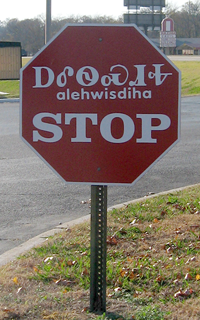
Bilingual stop sign in English and the Cherokee syllabary (transcription: ᎠᎴᏫᏍᏗᎭ, 'alehwisdiha'), Tahlequah, Oklahoma

There are approximately 314 spoken (or formerly spoken) indigenous languages north of Mexico grouped into 30 families and 24 isolates not counting about one hundred unclassified languages. (Note: Campbell counts Keres, Yokuts and Salinan as small families. Here, in Wikipedia, they are considered isolates.) The Na-Dene, Algic, and Uto-Aztecan families are the largest in terms of number of languages. Uto-Aztecan has the most speakers (1.95 million) if the languages in Mexico are considered (mostly due to 1.5 million speakers of Nahuatl); Na-Dene comes in second with approximately 200,000 speakers (nearly 180,000 of these are speakers of Navajo), and Algic in third with about 180,000 speakers (mainly Cree and Ojibwe). Na-Dené and Algic have the widest geographic distributions: Algic currently spans from northeastern Canada across much of the continent down to northeastern Mexico (due to later migrations of the Kickapoo) with two outliers in California (Yurok and Wiyot); Na-Dene spans from Alaska and western Canada through Washington, Oregon, and California to the southwestern US and northern Mexico (with one outlier in the Plains). Several families consist of only 2 or 3 languages. Demonstrating genetic relationships has proved difficult due to the great linguistic diversity present in North America. Two large (super-)family proposals, Penutian and Hokan, have been proposed. However, even after decades of research, a large number of families remain.

North America is notable for its linguistic diversity, especially in California. This area has 18 language families comprising 74 languages (compared to two indigenous families in Europe: Indo-European and Uralic, and one isolate, Basque). (Note: If the Caucasus is considered to be a part of Europe, Northwest Caucasian, Northeast Caucasian and Kartvelian would be included, resulting in five language families within Europe. Other language families, such as the Turkic, Mongolic and Afroasiatic families, have entered Europe in later migrations.)

Another area of considerable diversity appears to have been the Southeastern Woodlands; however, many of these languages became extinct from European contact and as a result they are, for the most part, absent from the historical record. This diversity has influenced the development of linguistic theories and practice in the US.

Due to the diversity of languages in North America, it is difficult to make generalizations for the region. Most North American languages have a relatively small number of vowels (i.e. three to five vowels). Languages of the western half of North America often have relatively large consonant inventories. The languages of the Pacific Northwest are notable for their complex phonotactics (for example, some languages have words that lack vowels entirely). The languages of the Plateau area have relatively rare pharyngeals and epiglottals (they are otherwise restricted to Afroasiatic languages and the languages of the Caucasus). Ejective consonants are also common in western North America, although they are rare elsewhere (except, again, for the Caucasus region, parts of Africa, and the Mayan family).

Head-marking is found in many languages of North America (as well as in Central and South America), but outside of the Americas it is rare. Many languages throughout North America are polysynthetic (Eskaleut languages are extreme examples), although this is not characteristic of all North American languages (contrary to what was believed by 19th-century linguists). Several families have unique traits, such as the inverse number marking of the Tanoan languages, the lexical affixes of the Wakashan, Salishan and Chimakuan languages, and the unusual verb structure of Na-Dené.

The classification below is a composite of Goddard (1996), Campbell (2024), and Mithun (1999).

- Adai †
- Algic (30)
- Alsea †
- Atakapa †
- Beothuk †
- Caddoan (5)
- Cayuse †
- Chimakuan (2) †
- Chimariko †
- Chinookan (3) †
- Chitimacha †
- Chumashan (6) †
- Coahuilteco †
- Comecrudan (United States and Mexico) (3) †
- Coosan (2) †
- Cotoname †
- Eskaleut (7)
- Esselen †
- Haida
- Iroquoian (11)
- Kalapuyan (3) †
- Karankawa †
- Karuk
- Keresan (2)
- Kutenai
- Maiduan (4)
- Muskogean (9)
- Na-Dené (United States, Canada and Mexico) (39)
- Natchez †
- Palaihnihan (2) †
- Plateau Penutian (4) (also known as Shahapwailutan)
- Pomoan (7)
- Salinan †
- Salishan (23)
- Shastan (4) †
- Siouan (19)
- Siuslaw †
- Solano †
- Takelma †
- Tanoan (7)
- Timucua †
- Tonkawa †
- Tsimshianic (2)
- Tunica †
- Utian (15) (also known as Miwok–Costanoan)
- Uto-Aztecan (33)
- Wakashan (7)
- Washo
- Wintuan (4)
- Yana †
- Yokutsan (6)
- Yuchi †
- Yuki-Wappo (2) †
- Yuman–Cochimí (12)
- Zuni

=== Central America and Mexico ===
Pre-contact distribution of native American languages in New Spain (Mexico, Southwest US, Central America)

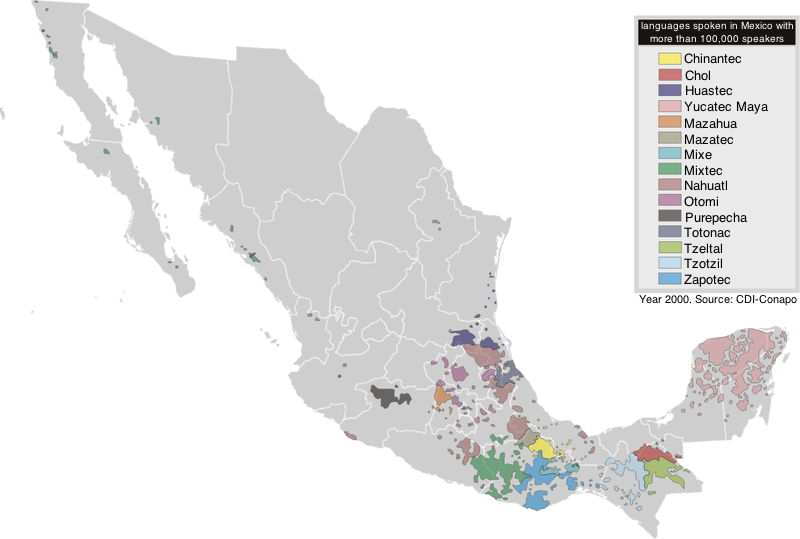
The indigenous languages of Mexico that had more than 100,000 speakers as of the year 2000

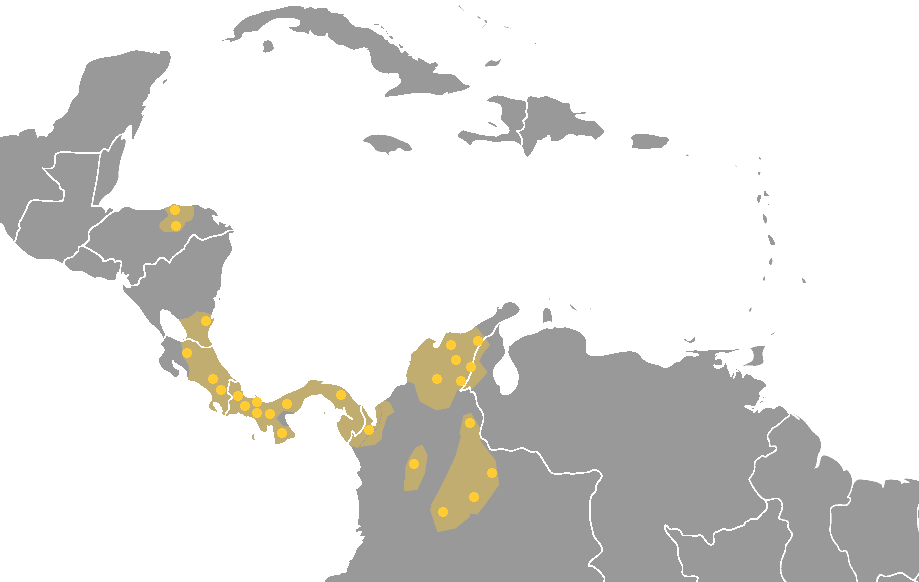
The Chibchan languages

In Central America the Mayan languages are among those used today. Mayan languages are spoken by at least six million indigenous Maya, primarily in Guatemala, Mexico, Belize and Honduras. In 1996, Guatemala formally recognized 21 Mayan languages by name, and Mexico recognizes eight more. The Mayan language family is one of the best documented and most studied in the Americas. Modern Mayan languages descend from Proto-Mayan, a language thought to have been spoken at least 4,000 years ago; it has been partially reconstructed using the comparative method.

- Chibchan (Central and South America) (22)
- Cuitlatec (Mexico: Guerrero) †
- Huave
- Jicaquean (2)
- Lencan (2) †
- Mayan (31)
- Misumalpan (5)
- Mixe–Zoquean (19)
- Oto-Manguean (27)
- Purépecha
- Seri
- Tequistlatecan (3)
- Totonacan (2)
- Uto-Aztecan (United States and Mexico) (33)
- Xincan (5) †
- Yuman (United States and Mexico) (12)

=== South America and the Caribbean ===
Indigenous languages of South America
- (geographic)
- Geographic distribution: South America
- Ethnicity: Indigenous peoples of South America
- Linguistic classification: Not a family
- Subdivisions: Over 100 distinct families

Language codes
- ISO 639-2 / 5: sai
- Glottolog: None

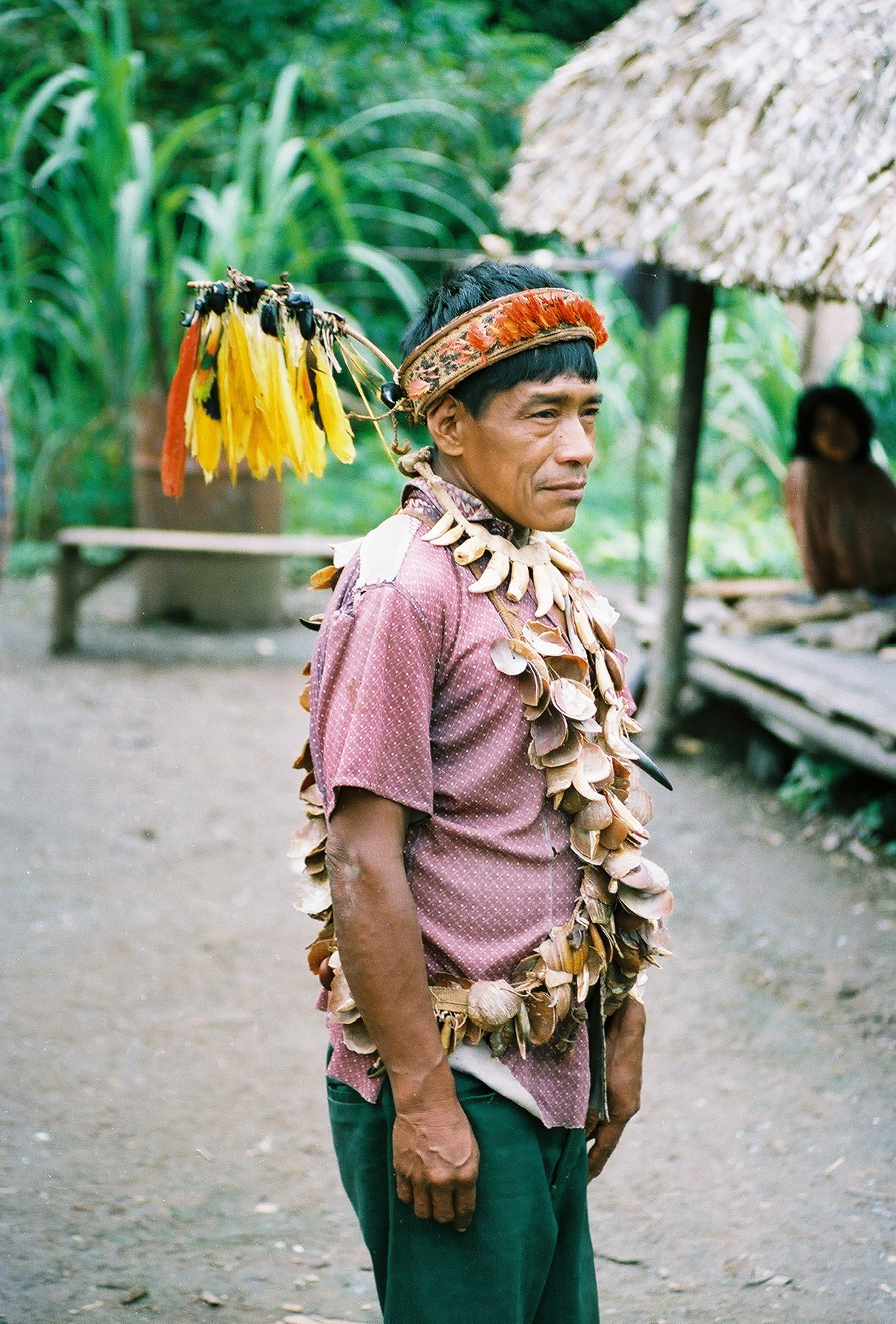
A Urarina shaman, 1988

Although both North and Central America are very diverse areas, South America has a linguistic diversity rivalled by only a few other places in the world with approximately 330 languages still spoken and several hundred more spoken at first contact but now extinct. The situation of language documentation and classification into genetic families is not as advanced as in North America (which is relatively well studied in many areas). Kaufman (1994: 46) gives the following appraisal:

Since the mid 1950s, the amount of published material on SA [South America] has been gradually growing, but even so, the number of researchers is far smaller than the growing number of linguistic communities whose speech should be documented. Given the current employment opportunities, it is not likely that the number of specialists in SA Indian languages will increase fast enough to document most of the surviving SA languages before they go out of use, as most of them unavoidably will. More work languishes in personal files than is published, but this is a standard problem.

It is fair to say that SA and New Guinea are linguistically the poorest documented parts of the world. However, in the early 1960s fairly systematic efforts were launched in Papua New Guinea, and that area – much smaller than SA, to be sure – is in general much better documented than any part of Indigenous SA of comparable size.

As a result, many relationships between languages and language families have not been determined and some of those relationships that have been proposed are on somewhat shaky ground.

The list of language families, isolates, and unclassified languages below is a rather conservative one based on Campbell (2024). Many of the proposed (and often speculative) groupings of families can be seen in Campbell (1997), Gordon (2005), Kaufman (1990, 1994), Key (1979), Loukotka (1968), and in the Language stock proposals section below.

1. Arawakan (Maipurean, Maipuran) (~65–80) – widespread
2. Cariban (~40–50) – Brazil, Venezuela, Colombia, etc.
3. Chapacuran (Txapakúran) (10) – Brazil, Bolivia
4. Chibchan (23) – Colombia, Venezuela, Panama, Costa Rica
5. Macro-Jê Sensu Stricto (~33) – Brazil
6. Pano–Takanan (~39) – Brazil, Peru, Bolivia
7. Quechuan (23 ?) – Colombia, Ecuador, Peru, Bolivia, Argentina
8. Tukanoan (Tucanoan) (~29, 8 extinct) – Colombia, Ecuador, Peru, Brazil
9. Tupían (~55–70) – Brazil, Paraguay, Bolivia, etc.
10. Arawan (Arahuan, Arauan, Arawán) (6?) – Brazil, Peru
11. Aymaran (2) – Bolivia, Peru
12. Barbacoan (5) – Colombia, Ecuador
13. Boran (3) – Brazil, Colombia
14. Bororoan (3) – Brazil
15. Cahuapanan (3, possibly 2) – Peru
16. Cañar–Puruhá (2; uncertain) – Ecuador
17. Charruan (3) – Uruguay, Argentina
18. Chicham (4) – Peru, Ecuador
19. Chocoan (3?) – Colombia, Panama
20. Cholonan (2) – Peru
21. Chonan (Chon) (5–6?) – Argentina
22. Enlhet–Enenlhet Mascoyan (6) – Paraguay
23. Guaicuruan (Waykuruan) (5) – Argentina, Paraguay, Brazil
24. Guajiboan (4) – Colombia
25. Harákmbut–Katukinan (4) – Peru, Brazil
26. Huarpean (Warpean) (2) – Argentina
27. Jirajaran (3) – Venezuela
28. Kakua–Nukak (2) – Colombia, Brazil
29. Karirian (Karirí) (4) – Brazil
30. Kaweskaran (Qawasqaran, Alacalufan) (3?) – Chile
31. Lule–Vilelan (2) – Argentina
32. Mapudungun (Mapudungu, Araucano, Mapuche, Maputongo) (2) – Chile, Argentina
33. Matacoan (4) – Argentina, Paraguay, Bolivia
34. Nadahup (4) – Colombia, Venezuela, Brazil
35. Nambikwaran (4 ?) – Brazil
36. Otomacoan (2) – Venezuela
37. Sáliban (Sálivan) (3 ?) – Venezuela, Colombia
38. Tallán (2) – Peru
39. Tikuna–Yuri (3) – Peru, Colombia, Brazil
40. Timotean (2) – Venezuela
41. Tiniguan (2) – Colombia
42. Uru–Chipaya (3) – Bolivia
43. Yaguan (3) – Peru
44. Witotoan (Huitotoan) (5) – Colombia, Peru
45. Yanomaman (4) – Venezuela, Brazil
46. Zamucoan (2) – Paraguay, Bolivia
47. Zaparoan (3–8?) – Peru, Ecuador
48. Aikaná – Brazil
49. Andaquí – Colombia
50. Andoque (Andoke) – Colombia, Peru
51. Arara do Rio Branco – Brazil
52. Arutani (Ahuaqué, Uruak) – Venezuela, Brazil
53. Atacameño (Cunza, Kunza, Atacama, Lipe) – Chile, Bolivia, Argentina
54. Betoi–Jirara – Colombia
55. Candoshi (Candoxi, Maina, Shapra, Murato) – Peru
56. Canichana – Bolivia
57. Cayuvava (Cayuwaba, Cayubaba) – Bolivia
58. Chiquitano – Bolivia
59. Chono – Chile
60. Cofán (A'ingaé) – Colombia, Ecuador
61. Culle – Peru
62. Esmeralda – Ecuador
63. Guachí – Brazil
64. Guamo – Venezuela
65. Guató – Brazil
66. Iatê (Furniô, Fornió, Carnijó; Yaté) – Brazil
67. Irantxe (Iranche, Münkü) – Brazil
68. Itonama (Saramo, Machoto) – Bolivia, Brazil
69. Jotí (Yuwana) – Venezuela
70. Kamsá (Sibundoy, Coche) – Colombia
71. Kanoê (Kanoé, Kapixaná) – Brazil
72. Kwaza (Koayá, Koaiá, Arara) – Brazil
73. Leko – Bolivia
74. Máku – Brazil
75. Matanawí – Brazil
76. Mochica (Yunga, Yunca, Chimú, Mochica, Muchic) – Peru
77. Moseten–Chimane (Mosetén) – Bolivia
78. Movima – Bolivia
79. Munichi (Muniche, Munichino, Otanabe) – Peru
80. Omurano (Humurana, Numurana) – Peru
81. Paezan (1–3; small family ?) – Colombia
82. Payaguá – Paraguay
83. Pirahã (Muran) (possibly family of close languages) – Brazil
84. Puinave (Wãnsöhöt) – Colombia, Venezuela
85. Purí–Coroado – Brazil
86. Puquina – Bolivia
87. Sapé (Kaliana, Caliana, Cariana, Chirichano) – Venezuela
88. Sechura? – Peru
89. Taruma (Taruamá) – Brazil, Guyana
90. Taushiro (Pinchi, Pinche) – Peru
91. Tequiraca (Tekiraka, Aushiri, Auishiri, Avishiri) – Peru
92. Trumai (Trumaí) – Brazil
93. Urarina (Simacu, Kachá, Itucale) – Peru
94. Waorani (Sabela, Huao, Auca, Huaorani, Auishiri) – Ecuador
95. Warao (Guarao, Warau, Guaruno) – Guyana, Suriname, Venezuela
96. Xukurú – Brazil
97. Yagan (Yaghan, Yamana, Yámana) – Chile
98. Yaruro (Pumé, Llaruro, Yaruru, Yuapín) – Venezuela
99. Yuracaré – Bolivia
100. Yurumangui – Colombia

== Language stock proposals ==
Hypothetical language-family proposals of American languages are often cited as uncontroversial in popular writing. However, many of these proposals have not been fully demonstrated, or even demonstrated at all. Some proposals are viewed by specialists in a favorable light, believing that genetic relationships are very likely to be established in the future (for example, the Penutian stock). Other proposals are more controversial, with many linguists believing that some genetic relationships of a proposal may be demonstrated but much of it undemonstrated (for example, Hokan–Siouan, which Edward Sapir called his "wastepaper basket stock"). Still other proposals are almost unanimously rejected by specialists (for example, Amerind). Below is a (partial) list of some such proposals:

- Algonquian–Wakashan (also known as Almosan)
- Almosan–Keresiouan (Almosan and Keresiouan)
- Amerind (all languages excepting Eskaleut and Na-Dené)
- Algonkian–Gulf (Algic, Beothuk and Gulf)
- (macro-)Arawakan
- Arutani–Sape (Ahuaque–Kalianan)
- Aztec–Tanoan (Uto-Aztecan and Tanoan)
- Chibchan–Paezan
- Chikitano–Boróroan
- Chimu–Chipaya
- Coahuiltecan (Coahuilteco, Cotoname, Comecrudan, Karankawa and Tonkawa)
- Cunza–Kapixanan
- Dené–Caucasian
- Dené–Yeniseian
- Esmeralda–Yaruroan
- Ge–Pano–Carib
- Guamo–Chapacuran
- Gulf (Muskogean, Natchez and Tunica)
- Macro-Kulyi–Cholónan
- Hokan (Karok, Chimariko, Shastan, Palaihnihan, Yana, Pomoan, Washo, Esselen, Yuman, Salinan, Chumashan, Seri and Tequistlatecan)
- Hokan–Siouan (Hokan, Keresiouan, Subtiaba–Tlappanec, Coahuiltecan, Yukian, Tunican, Natchez, Muskogean and Timucua)
- Je–Tupi–Carib
- Jivaroan–Cahuapanan
- Kalianan
- Kandoshi–Omurano–Taushiro
- (Macro-)Katembri–Taruma
- Kaweskar language area
- Keresiouan (Macro-Siouan, Keresan and Yuchi)
- Lule–Vilelan
- Macro-Andean
- Macro-Carib
- Macro-Chibchan
- Macro-Gê (also known as Macro-Jê)
- Macro-Jibaro
- Macro-Lekoan
- Macro-Mayan
- Macro-Otomákoan
- Macro-Paesan
- Macro-Panoan
- Macro-Puinavean
- Macro-Siouan (Siouan, Iroquoian and Caddoan)
- Macro-Tucanoan
- Macro-Tupí–Karibe
- Macro-Waikurúan
- Macro-Warpean (Muran, Matanawi and Huarpe)
- Mataco–Guaicuru
- Mosan (Salishan, Wakashan and Chimakuan)
- Mosetén–Chonan
- Mura–Matanawian
- Sapir's Na-Dené including Haida (Haida, Tlingit, Eyak and Athabaskan)
- Nostratic–Amerind
- Paezan (Andaqui, Paez and Panzaleo)
- Paezan–Barbacoan
- Penutian (many languages of California and sometimes languages in Mexico)
  - California Penutian (Wintuan, Maiduan, Yokutsan and Utian)
  - Oregon Penutian (Takelma, Coosan, Siuslaw and Alsean)
  - Mexican Penutian (Mixe–Zoque and Huave)
- Puinave–Maku
- Quechumaran
- Saparo–Yawan (also known as Zaparo–Yaguan)
- Sechura–Catacao (also known as Sechura–Tallan)
- Takelman (Takelma and Kalapuyan)
- Tequiraca–Canichana
- Ticuna–Yuri (Yuri–Ticunan)
- Totozoque (Totonacan and Mixe–Zoque)
- Tunican (Tunica, Atakapa and Chitimacha)
- Yok–Utian
- Yuki–Wappo

Discussions of past proposals can be found in Campbell (1997) and Campbell & Mithun (1979).

Amerindian linguist Lyle Campbell also assigned different percentage values of probability and confidence for various proposals of macro-families and language relationships, depending on his views of the proposals' strengths. For example, the Germanic language family would receive probability and confidence percentage values of +100% and 100%, respectively. However, if Turkish and Quechua were compared, the probability value might be −95%, while the confidence value might be 95%. 0% probability or confidence would mean complete uncertainty.

Language family	Probability	Confidence
Algonkian–Gulf	−50%	50%
Almosan (and beyond)	−75%	50%
Atakapa–Chitimacha	−50%	60%
Aztec–Tanoan	0%	50%
Coahuiltecan	−85%	80%
Eskaleut, Chukotan	−25%	20%
Guaicurian–Hokan	0%	10%
Gulf	−25%	40%
Hokan–Subtiaba	−90%	75%
Jicaque–Hokan	−30%	25%
Jicaque–Subtiaba	−60%	80%
Jicaque–Tequistlatecan	+65%	50%
Keresan and Uto-Aztecan	0%	60%
Keresan and Zuni	−40%	40%
Macro-Mayan	+30%	25%
Macro-Siouan	−20%	75%
Maya–Chipaya	−80%	95%
Maya–Chipaya–Yunga	−90%	95%
Mexican Penutian	−40%	60%
Misumalpan–Chibchan	+20%	50%
Mosan	−60%	65%
Na-Dene	0%	25%
Natchez–Muskogean	+40%	20%
Nostratic–Amerind	−90%	75%
Otomanguean–Huave	+25%	25%
Purépecha–Quechua	−90%	80%
Quechua as Hokan	−85%	80%
Quechumaran	+50%	50%
Sahaptian–Klamath–(Molala)	+75%	50%
Sahaptian–Klamath–Tsimshian	+10%	10%
Takelman	+80%	60%
Tlapanec–Subtiaba as Otomanguean	+95%	90%
Tlingit–Eyak–Athabaskan	+75%	40%
Tunican	0%	20%
Wakashan and Chimakuan	0%	25%
Yukian–Gulf	−85%	70%
Yukian–Siouan	−60%	75%
Zuni–Penutian	−80%	50%

== Pronouns ==
It has long been observed that a remarkable number of Native American languages have a pronominal pattern with first-person singular forms in n and second-person singular forms in m. (Compare first-person singular m and second-person singular t across much of northern Eurasia, as in English me and thee, Spanish me and te, and Hungarian -m and -d.) This pattern was first noted by Alfredo Trombetti in 1905. It caused Sapir to suggest that ultimately all Native American languages would turn out to be related. Joseph Greenberg used the pattern as evidence to support his Amerind languages proposal, a controversial grouping. Johanna Nichols suggests that the pattern had spread through diffusion. This notion was rejected by Lyle Campbell, who argued that the frequency of the n/m pattern was not statistically elevated in either area compared to the rest of the world. Zamponi found that Nichols's findings were distorted by her small sample size. Looking instead at data from protolanguages and isolates to represent whole families rather than individual languages, he found that about 30% of 70 languages analyzed followed the n/m pattern in North America, compared to only 5% in South America and 7% of non-American languages. Nevertheless, Zamponi concludes that because most languages of the world base their pronouns on common consonants (like m, n, t, k and s), this shared pattern cannot be used as the only proof of common ancestry.

== Poorly attested and unattested languages ==
Several languages are only known by mention in historical documents or from only a few names or words. It cannot be determined that these languages actually existed or that the few recorded words are actually of known or unknown languages. Some may simply be from a historian's errors. Others are of known people with no linguistic record (sometimes due to lost records). A short list is below.

- Ais
- Akokisa
- Alagüilac
- Ausaima
- Avoyel
- Bayagoula
- Bidai
- Cabil (possibly an old name for Chicomuceltec)
- Calusa – Mayaimi – Tequesta
- Chontal of Guerrero
- Chumbia
- Coahuiltecan (term of convenience for several languages)
- Cusabo
- Epi-Olmec
- Eyeish
- Grigra
- Guale
- Houma
- Koroa
- Maratino
- Mayaca (possibly related to Ais)
- Mazatec of Guerrero
- Mobila
- Naolan
- Okelousa
- Opelousa
- Otomi of Jalisco
- Pascagoula
- Pensacola – Amacano - Chacato - Chine (Muscogean languages)
- Pericú
- Pisabo (possibly the same language as Matsés)
- Quinigua
- Quinipissa
- Taensa
- Tepuztec
- Tiou
- Waikuri
- Yamacraw
- Yamasee
- Yazoo
- Zapotec of Jalisco

See also List of extinct Uto-Aztecan languages.

== Pidgins and mixed languages ==
Various miscellaneous languages such as pidgins, mixed languages, trade languages, and sign languages are given below in alphabetical order.

1. American Indian Pidgin English
2. Algonquian-Basque pidgin (also known as Micmac-Basque Pidgin, Souriquois; spoken by the Basques, Micmacs, and Montagnais in eastern Canada)
3. Broken Oghibbeway (also known as Broken Ojibwa)
4. Broken Slavey
5. Bungee (also known as Bungi, Bungie, Bungay, or the Red River Dialect)
6. Callahuaya (also known as Machaj-Juyai, Kallawaya, Collahuaya, Pohena, Kolyawaya Jargon)
7. Carib Pidgin (also known as Ndjuka-Amerindian Pidgin, Ndjuka-Trio)
8. Carib Pidgin–Arawak Mixed Language
9. Catalangu
10. Chinook Jargon
11. Delaware Jargon (also known as Pidgin Delaware)
12. Eskimo Trade Jargon (also known as Herschel Island Eskimo Pidgin, Ship's Jargon)
13. Greenlandic Pidgin (West Greenlandic Pidgin)
14. Guajiro-Spanish
15. Güegüence-Nicarao
16. Haida Jargon
17. Inuktitut-English Pidgin (Quebec)
18. Jargonized Powhatan
19. Keresan Sign Language
20. Labrador Eskimo Pidgin (also known as Labrador Inuit Pidgin)
21. Lingua Franca Apalachee
22. Lingua Franca Creek
23. Lingua Geral Amazônica (also known as Nheengatú, Lingua Boa, Lingua Brasílica, Lingua Geral do Norte)
24. Lingua Geral do Sul (also known as Lingua Geral Paulista, Tupí Austral)
25. Loucheux Jargon (also known as Jargon Loucheux)
26. Media Lengua
27. Mednyj Aleut (also known as Copper Island Aleut, Medniy Aleut, CIA)
28. Michif (also known as French Cree, Métis, Metchif, Mitchif, Métchif)
29. Mobilian Jargon (also known as Mobilian Trade Jargon, Chickasaw-Chocaw Trade Language, Yamá)
30. Montagnais Pidgin Basque (also known as Pidgin Basque-Montagnais)
31. Nootka Jargon (spoken during the 18th–19th centuries; later replaced by Chinook Jargon)
32. Ocaneechi (also known as Occaneechee; spoken in Virginia and the Carolinas in early colonial times)
33. Pidgin Massachusett
34. Plains Indian Sign Language

== Writing systems ==
While most indigenous languages have adopted the Latin script as the written form of their languages, a few languages have their own unique writing systems after encountering the Latin script (often through missionaries) that are still in use. All pre-Columbian indigenous writing systems are no longer used as the primary script, but many are undergoing revitalization.

Indigenous writing systems of the Americas
Writing system	Type	Language(s)	Region(s)	Dates in use	Status	Inventor
Quipu	Undeciphered. Potentially logographic with phonetic elements (syllabary) at least during the colonial period and possibly the pre-Columbian era.	Aymara, Quechua, Puquina, Mapuche and other Andean languages	Andean civilizations (Central Andes)	2600s BCE – 1900s CE	Extinct	
Olmec hieroglyphs	Undeciphered, likely logosyllabary	Likely Mixe–Zoque languages, but linguistic status remains debatable	Isthmus of Tehuantepec	1500 BCE – 400 BCE	Extinct	
Zapotec script	Undeciphered, likely logosyllabary	Likely Zapotecan languages	Oaxaca	500 BCE – 900 CE	Extinct	
Epi-Olmec script	Undeciphered, likely logosyllabary	Likely Zoque languages	Isthmus of Tehuantepec	400 BCE – 500 CE	Extinct	
Izapan scripts	Undeciphered, likely logosyllabary	Likely an unknown Mixe–Zoquean language, Highland Mayan languages	Southern Guatemala	300s BCE – 100s CE (Late Preclassic)	Extinct	
Maya script	Logographic; Syllabary	Mayan languages: Chʼolan languages, most notably Classic Maya (Ch'olti'); Tzeltalan languages; Yucatec Maya	Maya civilization: Yucatán Peninsula of Mexico, Guatemala, and Belize	200s BCE – 1700 CE	Extinct	
Teotihuacan script	Incipient decipherment, logosyllabary	Potentially Proto-Nahuan-Corachol	Central Mexico	100 BCE – 750 CE	Extinct	
Mixtec script (Mixteca-Puebla script)	Logographic; Syllabary	Classical Mixtec	Oaxaca, Puebla, Guerrero	1100s–1600s	Extinct	
Aztec script (Mixteca-Puebla script)	Logographic; Syllabary	Classical Nahuatl	Central Mexico	1100s–1600s	Extinct	
Komqwejwi'kasikl (Miꞌkmaw hieroglyphs)	Logographic Syllabary Alphabet	Mi'kmaq	Nova Scotia, Prince Edward Island, and New Brunswick	1675–1800s (as codified)	Extinct	Father Le Clercq (as codified, previously pictographic)
Cherokee syllabary	Syllabary	Cherokee	Cherokee Nation, US	1820s–present	Active	Sequoyah ᏍᏏᏉᏯ
Canadian Aboriginal syllabics	Abugida	Algonquian languages (Cree, Naskapi, and Anishinaabemowin); Eskaleut languages (Inuktitut and Inuinnaqtun); Athabaskan languages (Dane-zaa, Slavey, Chipewyan, and Sekani)	Canada, Midwestern United States	1840s–present	Active	James Evans
Blackfoot Syllabics	Abugida	Blackfoot	Alberta, Canada; Montana, United States	1888–present	Endangered	John Tims
Carrier syllabics	Abugida	Dakelh and some other Athabaskan languages	British Columbia, Canada	1885–1920s	Endangered	Adrien-Gabriel Morice
Great Lakes Algonquian syllabics	Alphasyllabary (much like Hangul)	Anishinaabemowin, Fox, Ho-Chunk, Potawatomi	Iowa, Michigan, and Nebraska, US; Coahuila, Mexico	1800s–present	Endangered	
Yugtun script	Syllabary	Central Alaskan Yup'ik	Alaska	1900–present	Endangered	Uyaquq
Afaka syllabary	Syllabary	Ndyuka	Suriname, French Guiana	1910–present	Endangered	Afáka Atumisi
Saanich alphabet	Alphabet	North Straits Salish (Saanich dialect)	Southern Salish Sea islands: British Columbia and Washington state	1978–present	Active	Dave Elliott
Osage script	Alphabet	Osage	Osage Nation, United States	2006–present	Active	Herman Mongrain Lookout

== See also ==
- Archive of the Indigenous Languages of Latin America
- Classification of the Indigenous peoples of the Americas
- Classification of the Indigenous languages of the Americas
- Colección de Lenguas Indígenas
- Haplogroup Q-M242
- Languages of Peru
- List of endangered languages in Canada
- List of endangered languages in Mexico
- List of endangered languages in the United States
- List of endangered languages with mobile apps
- List of indigenous languages of South America
- List of indigenous languages of Argentina
- List of organisms with names derived from Indigenous languages of the Americas
- Mesoamerican languages
- Native American Languages Act of 1990

== Bibliography ==
- Bright, William (1984). American Indian linguistics and literature. Berlin: Mouton de Gruyter. ISBN 3-11-009846-6..
- Brinton, Daniel G (1891). The American race. New York: D. C. Hodges.
- Campbell, Lyle (1997). American Indian languages: The historical linguistics of Native America. New York: Oxford University Press. ISBN 0-19-509427-1.
- Campbell, Lyle; Mithun, Marianne, eds. (1979). The languages of native America: Historical and comparative assessment. Austin: University of Texas Press.

=== North America ===
- Boas, Franz (1911). Handbook of American Indian languages. Bureau of American Ethnology. Vol. 1. Washington: Government Print Office.
- Boas, Franz (1911). Handbook of American Indian languages. Bureau of American Ethnology. Vol. 2. Washington: Government Print Office.
- Boas, Franz (1911). Handbook of American Indian languages. Bureau of American Ethnology. Vol. 3. Glückstadt: J.J. Augustin.
- Boas, Franz (1929). "Classification of American Indian languages". Language. 5 (1): 1–7. doi:10.2307/408990. JSTOR 408990.
- Bright, William (1973). "North American Indian language contact". In Sebeok, T. A. (ed.). Linguistics in North America. Current trends in linguistics. Vol. 10. The Hauge: Mouton. pp. 713–726.
- Goddard, Ives, ed. (1996). Handbook of North American Indians. Vol. 17. Washington: Smithsonian Institution. ISBN 0-16-048774-9.
- Goddard, Ives. (1999). Native languages and language families of North America (rev. and enlarged ed. with additions and corrections). [Map]. Lincoln, Nebraska: University of Nebraska Press (Smithsonian Institution). (Updated version of the map in Goddard 1996). ISBN 0-8032-9271-6.
- Goddard, Ives (2005). "The indigenous languages of the southeast". Anthropological Linguistics. 47 (1): 1–60.
- Mithun, Marianne (1990). "Studies of North American Indian Languages". Annual Review of Anthropology. 19 (1): 309–330. doi:10.1146/annurev.an.19.100190.001521.
- Mithun, Marianne (1999). The languages of Native North America. Cambridge: Cambridge University Press. ISBN 0-521-23228-7.
- Nater, Hank F. (1984). The Bella Coola Language. Mercury Series; Canadian Ethnology Service (No. 92). Ottawa: National Museums of Canada.
- Powell, John W. (1891). Indian linguistic families of America north of Mexico. Seventh annual report, Bureau of American Ethnology (pp. 1–142). Washington, D.C.: Government Printing Office. (Reprinted in P. Holder (Ed.), 1966, Introduction to Handbook of American Indian languages by Franz Boas and Indian linguistic families of America, north of Mexico, by J. W. Powell, Lincoln: University of Nebraska).
- Powell, John W. (1915). Linguistic families of American Indians north of Mexico by J. W. Powell, revised by members of the staff of the Bureau of American Ethnology. (Map). Bureau of American Ethnology miscellaneous publication (No. 11). Baltimore: Hoen.
- Sebeok, Thomas A. (Ed.). (1973). Linguistics in North America (parts 1 & 2). Current trends in linguistics (Vol. 10). The Hauge: Mouton. (Reprinted as Sebeok 1976).
- Sebeok, Thomas A. (Ed.). (1976). Native languages of the Americas. New York: Plenum.
- Sherzer, Joel. (1973). Areal linguistics in North America. In T. A. Sebeok (Ed.), Linguistics in North America (part 2, pp. 749–795). Current trends in linguistics (Vol. 10). The Hauge: Mouton. (Reprinted in Sebeok 1976).
- Sherzer, Joel. (1976). An areal-typological study of American Indian languages north of Mexico. Amsterdam: North-Holland.
- Sletcher, Michael, 'North American Indians', in Will Kaufman and Heidi Macpherson, eds., Britain and the Americas: Culture, Politics, and History, (2 vols., Oxford, 2005).
- Sturtevant, William C. (Ed.). (1978–present). Handbook of North American Indians (Vol. 1–20). Washington, D. C.: Smithsonian Institution. (Vols. 1–3, 16, 18–20 not yet published).
- Vaas, Rüdiger: 'Die Sprachen der Ureinwohner'. In: Stoll, Günter, Vaas, Rüdiger: Spurensuche im Indianerland. Hirzel. Stuttgart 2001, chapter 7.
- Voegelin, Carl F.; & Voegelin, Florence M. (1965). Classification of American Indian languages. Languages of the world, Native American fasc. 2, sec. 1.6). Anthropological Linguistics, 7 (7): 121–150.
- Zepeda, Ofelia; Hill, Jane H. (1991). "The condition of Native American Languages in the United States". In Robins, R. H.; Uhlenbeck, E. M. (eds.). Endangered languages. Oxford: Berg. pp. 135–155.

=== South America ===
- Adelaar, Willem F. H.; & Muysken, Pieter C. (2004). The languages of the Andes. Cambridge language surveys. Cambridge University Press.
- Fabre, Alain. (1998). "Manual de las lenguas indígenas sudamericanas, I-II". München: Lincom Europa.
- Kaufman, Terrence. (1990). Language history in South America: What we know and how to know more. In D. L. Payne (Ed.), Amazonian linguistics: Studies in lowland South American languages (pp. 13–67). Austin: University of Texas Press. ISBN 0-292-70414-3.
- Kaufman, Terrence. (1994). The native languages of South America. In C. Mosley & R. E. Asher (Eds.), Atlas of the world's languages (pp. 46–76). London: Routledge.
- Key, Mary R. (1979). The grouping of South American languages. Tübingen: Gunter Narr Verlag.
- Loukotka, Čestmír. (1968). Classification of South American Indian languages. Los Angeles: Latin American Studies Center, University of California.
- Mason, J. Alden. (1950). The languages of South America. In J. Steward (Ed.), Handbook of South American Indians (Vol. 6, pp. 157–317). Smithsonian Institution Bureau of American Ethnology bulletin (No. 143). Washington, D.C.: Government Printing Office.
- Migliazza, Ernest C.; & Campbell, Lyle. (1988). Panorama general de las lenguas indígenas en América. Historia general de América (Vol. 10). Caracas: Instituto Panamericano de Geografía e Historia.
- Rodrigues, Aryon. (1986). Linguas brasileiras: Para o conhecimento das linguas indígenas. São Paulo: Edições Loyola.
- Rowe, John H. (1954). Linguistics classification problems in South America. In M. B. Emeneau (Ed.), Papers from the symposium on American Indian linguistics (pp. 10–26). University of California publications in linguistics (Vol. 10). Berkeley: University of California Press.
- Sapir, Edward. (1929). Central and North American languages. In The encyclopædia britannica: A new survey of universal knowledge (14 ed.) (Vol. 5, pp. 138–141). London: The Encyclopædia Britannica Company, Ltd.
- Voegelin, Carl F.; & Voegelin, Florence M. (1977). Classification and index of the world's languages. Amsterdam: Elsevier. ISBN 0-444-00155-7.
- Debian North American Indigenous Languages Project
