= Tame, Arauca =

Coordinates: 6°28′N 71°44′W

- Municipality and town

- Flag Coat of arms

- Location of the municipality and town of Tame, Arauca in the Arauca Department of Colombia
- Country: Colombia
- Department: Arauca Department
- Founded: June 12, 1628

Government
  - Mayor: Anibal Mendoza Bohorquez (2020-2023)

Area
  - Municipality and town: 5,419 km^{2} (2,092 sq mi)
  - Urban: 9.46 km^{2} (3.65 sq mi)
- Elevation: 340 m (1,120 ft)

Population (2018 census)
  - Municipality and town: 43,932
  - Density: 8.107/km^{2} (21.00/sq mi)
  - Urban: 26,784
  - Urban density: 2,830/km^{2} (7,330/sq mi)
- Time zone: UTC-5 (Colombia Standard Time)
- Climate: Am

Tame is a town and municipality in the Arauca Department, Colombia. The municipality has a total area of around 5,419 square kilometres or 2,090 square miles.

== History ==
The region was explored by the German conquistador Jorge de Espira in 1536. There he encountered several Indian tribes from the Arawakan and the Goajiboan language families; Arauca, Caquetio, Lucalia, Girara, Chiricoa, Cuiba, Guahibo and Achagua. The Girara people lived at the exact location of the modern town (or closest to).

Tame was founded by Alonso Pérez de Guzmán on June 12, 1628. He also founded "Espinosa de las Palmas" nearby, for civilian Spaniards. The village was destroyed a few years later by the natives in confrontations in which Pérez de Guzmán and his soldiers were killed by the Girara Indians of Tame in revenge for the slavery treatment.

== Geography ==
The municipality of Arauca borders to the north with the municipality of Fortul, to the northeast with the municipality of Arauquita, to the east with the municipality of Puerto Rondón, to the south with the Casanare Department and to the west with the Boyacá Department.

== Climate ==
Tame has a tropical monsoon climate (Köppen Am) with moderate to little rainfall from December to March and heavy to very heavy rainfall from April to November.

Climate data for Tame, elevation 350 m (1,150 ft), (1981–2010)
Month	Jan	Feb	Mar	Apr	May	Jun	Jul	Aug	Sep	Oct	Nov	Dec	Year
Mean daily maximum °C (°F)	32.0 (89.6)	32.1 (89.8)	32.0 (89.6)	32.3 (90.1)	31.5 (88.7)	31.1 (88.0)	30.9 (87.6)	31.2 (88.2)	31.5 (88.7)	32.1 (89.8)	32.1 (89.8)	31.8 (89.2)	31.6 (88.9)
Daily mean °C (°F)	26.3 (79.3)	26.5 (79.7)	26.7 (80.1)	26.2 (79.2)	26.0 (78.8)	25.5 (77.9)	25.4 (77.7)	25.5 (77.9)	25.7 (78.3)	26.0 (78.8)	26.1 (79.0)	26.3 (79.3)	26 (79)
Mean daily minimum °C (°F)	22.9 (73.2)	22.9 (73.2)	22.9 (73.2)	22.7 (72.9)	22.5 (72.5)	22.0 (71.6)	22.1 (71.8)	22.0 (71.6)	22.2 (72.0)	22.5 (72.5)	22.6 (72.7)	22.4 (72.3)	22.5 (72.5)
Average precipitation mm (inches)	28.3 (1.11)	36.9 (1.45)	69.7 (2.74)	187.2 (7.37)	289.7 (11.41)	303.7 (11.96)	294.4 (11.59)	247.1 (9.73)	211.0 (8.31)	205.5 (8.09)	110.2 (4.34)	32.3 (1.27)	1,903.3 (74.93)
Average precipitation days (≥ 1.0 mm 3)	3	4	6	13	18	17	16	15	12	13	8	4	120
Average relative humidity (%)	81	80	83	84	85	86	86	86	85	84	83	83	84
Source: Instituto de Hidrologia Meteorologia y Estudios Ambientales

== Transportation ==
The city is served by Gabriel Vargas Santos Airport.
