= Guahibo =

Guahibo, Guajibo or Sikuani may refer to:

- Guahibo people, an ethnic group of Colombia and Venezuela
- Guahibo language, a language of Colombia and Venezuela
