= Playero =

Playero (Spanish for "of the beach") may refer to:

- Playeros (Equatorial Guinea), a group of ethnicities of Equatorial Guinea
- Playeros (Panama), an ethnic group of Panama
- Playeros (Colombia and Venezuela), an indigenous people of Colombia and Venezuela
- Playero language, a language of Colombia and Venezuela
- Playeros, inhabitants of Playa, Ponce, Puerto Rico
- DJ Playero, Puerto Rican musician
- Playeros, nickname for CDCS Costa Del Sol Nairi's, a Belizean football team
- the common Spanish name for several birds of the Calidris genus
