= Churuya language =

Extinct Guahiban language of Colombia

Churuya
- Bisanigua, Guaigua
- Native to: Colombia
- Extinct: (date missing)
- Language family: Guahiban: Churuya

Language codes
- ISO 639-3: None (mis)
- Linguist List: qds
- Glottolog: None guah1255 (covered under Sikuani)

Churuya, also known as Bisanigua and Guaigua, is an extinct Guahiban language of Colombia. The only sources of the language are 20 words published in 1876 by Nicolas Saenz and another 32 words found in a manuscript found by Adolf Ernst in 1891. Comparison by Sergio Elias Ortiz in 1943 found that 24 words matched with other Guahibo words, while seven others were believed to be borrowed from the Orinoco area, and one was a loanword from Quechua.
