= Labrador Inuit Pidgin French =

Extinct French-lexified pidgin

- Belle Isle Pidgin
- Region: Straits of Belle Isle
- Era: late 17th century until ca. 1760
- Language family: French Pidgin
- Writing system: Latin Script

Language codes
- ISO 639-3: None (mis)
- Glottolog: bell1264

Labrador Inuit Pidgin French, also called Belle Isle Pidgin or Inuit French Jargon, was a French-lexified pidgin spoken between Breton and Basque fishermen and the Inuit of Labrador from the late 17th century until about 1760.

== History ==
The first traces of Labrador Inuit Pidgin French (LIPF) first appear in 1694, though it is first fully attested in the 1740s by a French Canadian entrepreneur named Jean-Louis Fornel. He said the pidgin was used by the Inuit and made up of a mix of French, Spanish, and possibly Breton. The last attestations were recorded in the 1760s, though the pidgin almost certainly survived past this date.

== Lexicon ==
The lexicon of LIPF was mostly French based but contained influence from Spanish, English, Dutch, Basque, and Breton.

== See also ==
- Algonquian–Basque pidgin, used in the same area
- NunatuKavummiut
