= Eskimo Trade Jargon =

Inuit pidgin of Canada

- Native to: Western Canadian Arctic, northern Alaska
- Ethnicity: Inuit, whalers
- Native speakers: Some rememberers may remain
- Language family: North Alaskan Iñupiaq-based pidgin
- Dialects: Herschel Island Eskimo Pidgin Point Barrow Pidgin Kotzebue Pidgin Point Hope Pidgin
- Writing system: Latin

Language codes
- ISO 639-3: None (mis)
- Glottolog: eski1266

Eskimo Trade Jargon was an Inuit pidgin used by Inuit of the Mackenzie River area as a trade language with the Dene or Athabaskan peoples to their south, such as the Gwichʼin (Loucheux). It was reported by Vilhjalmur Stefansson (1909), and was apparently distinct from the Athabaskan-based Loucheux Jargon, see Gwichʼin language, of the same general area.

A reduced form of the pidgin was used for ships' trade at Herschel Island off the Arctic coast near Alaska.

== History ==
Eskimo Trade Jargon formed from one the two "pidgin traditions" formed between Inuit and foreign whalers as they interacted, likely helped by the difficulty Europeans had in learning Inuit languages. The pidgin is recorded to have been used during the 19th and 20th centuries as American ships with international crews travelled to the North American Arctic. Because the international crews often spoke several different languages, but they all had to interact with Inuit, who's language ended up the becoming the main lexifier of Eskimo Trade Jargon. The pidgin went extinct sometime in the 20th century though some people who remember it may remain.

== Social and political factors ==
In the development of many contact languages, the language of the dominant group forms the basis of the language (ie. the lexicon). These dominant groups are typically seen as being European-based groups as they held more economical and political power. In the case of Eskimo Trade Jargon, the local Inuit language formed the basis of Eskimo Trade Jargon, despite them not being seen as the dominant group in this contact language relationship. There are several explanations as to why this may have occurred. First, Inuit may have had larger populations and held more cultural power than their European counterparts in this relationship, as the European whalers and traders would have needed to rely on Inuit for knowledge and resources to survive the Arctic conditions. Another reason why the Eskaleut language may have become the lexifier, is that many of the European ships were multi-ethnic, with many different languages being present on any given ship. This would have made the Eskaleut language the main variant in these contact situations.

== Dialects ==
As Eskimo Trade Pidgin emerged in several locations simultaneously the various areas it emerged in had different dialects of the pidgin. These dialects included: Herschel Island Pidgin, Point Barrow Pidgin, Kotzebue Pidgin, and Point Hope pidgin. While Eskimo Trade Jargon was similar to Slavey Jargon it was different enough that there wasn't enough mutual intelligibility to allow for communication between the two pidgins.

== Phonology ==
Consonants
		Bilabial	Labio-Dental	Labio-Velar	Alveolar	Palatal	Velar	Glottal
Plosive	Unvoiced	p			t	c	k	q
Plosive	Voiced	b			d		g	q
Nasal		m			n		ŋ	
Trill					r			
Fricative	Voiceless				s	Ç		
Fricative	Voiced		v	ɣ				ɦ
Lateral	Voiceless				ɬ			
Lateral	Voiced				l			
Approximant						j		

Vowels
	Front	Central	Back
Close	i		u
Close-Mid	e		o
Open		a	

== Grammar ==
In Eskimo Trade Jargon verbs and nouns cannot be distinguished via morphology, and they can sometimes not even semantically. An example being the word kaukau which means both ‘to eat’ and ‘food’. In Eskimo Trade Jargon the meaning of phrases is extremely context dependant and vague. Often times subjects are not expressed expressly, and the translation of the statement depends on the context.

Phrasal vagueness in ETJ
ETJ	Literal Translation	Interpretive Translation 1	Interpretive Translation 2
innitin picuktu	Sit want	I want to sit down	He wants to sit down
kapi suli pĭcuktu awoña	coffee more want I	I want coffee also	I want some more coffee
tuktu tautuk picuktu awoña	caribou see want I	I am hunting caribou	I want to see caribou
kaukau pītcūk owoxña	eat not I	I have no food	I have not eaten

Pronouns
1sg	awoña
2sg	ĭllĭpsī
3sg	ī'la
1pl	Undocumented
2pl	illuit
3pl	Undocumented

== Lexicon ==
The Lexicon of ETJ is very diverse, while most words are from either an Inuit language or English words from other languages are found. Of all Inuit languages the one with the most vocabulary in ETJ is North Slope dialect of Iñupiaq. Other contributing languages include Hawaiian Pidgin, Chinook Jargon, Danish, Portuguese, and possibly Old Icelandic.

Words would often undergo significant changes after being loaned into Eskimo Trade Jargon, making them unrecognizable from their original forms. Examples being the words u' ra and pau' from the English words Rice and powder respectively.

== Examples ==
Eskimo Trade Jargon	English
nanako opinera malo tereva awoña kaili suli picuktu	After two summers are finished I want to come again.
ō-mī-ak-pûk a-lak’-tok pĭ-cū’k-tok a-woñ-a	I want to go on shipboard.
wai’hinni artegi annahanna pûgmûmmi	The woman is sewing a coat now.
