= Guajiboan languages =

Macro-Arawakan language family spoken in Colombia

Guajiban
- Wahívoan, Guajiboan
- Geographic distribution: Colombian and Venezuelan Llanos
- Linguistic classification: One of the world's primary language families
- Subdivisions: Macaguane; Southwest; Central

Language codes
- Glottolog: guah1252
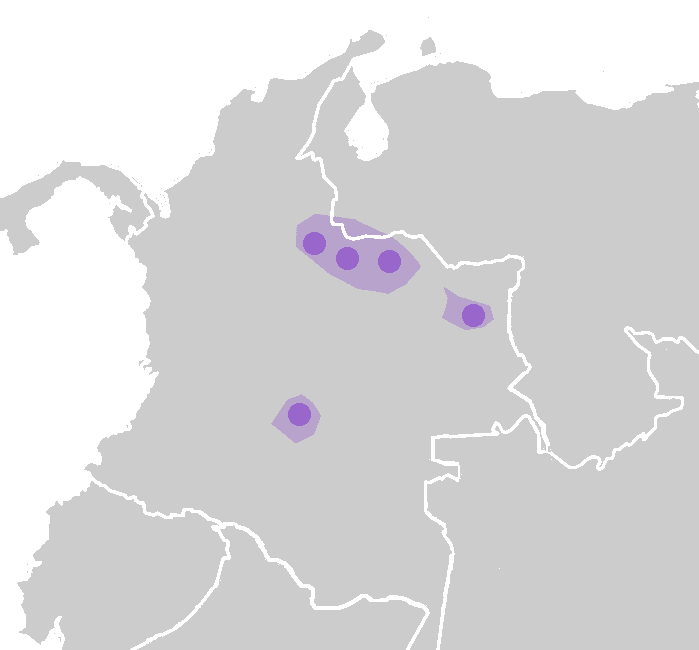

Guajiboan (also Guahiban, Wahívoan, Guahiboan) is a language family spoken in the Orinoco River region in eastern Colombia and southwestern Venezuela, a savanna region known as the Llanos.

== Family division ==
Guajiboan consists of 5 languages:

- Guajiboan
  - Macaguane (also known as Hitnü, Macaguán, Makawane, Agualinda, Agualinda Guahibo, Támude)
  - Southwest Guajiboan
    - Guayabero (also known as Cunimía, Mítiwa, Mitúa, Mitu, Hiw, Jiw, Wayavero, Guaviare)
    - †Churuya (also known as Bisanigua, Guaigua)
  - Central Guajiboan
    - Guajibo (also known as Guahibo, Sikuani, Sicuani, Chiricoa, Hiwi, Jiwi, Jivi, Wahivo, Wahibo, Guaybo, Goahibo, Guaigua, Guayba, Goahiva)
      - Waü (west)
      - Newütjü (also known as Tigrero)
      - Parawá (east)
      - Hamorúa (also known as Amorúa, Jamorúa)
      - Dome (also known as Playero, Cajaro)
    - Cuiva (also known as Wamonae, Cuiba, Kuiba, Deja, Cuiba-Wámonae)
      - Pimenepiwi (Meta river)
      - Aitopiwi (Ariporo river)
      - Yaraüraxi (Capanaparo river)
      - Waüpiwi (also known as Wipiwi, Yomati)
      - Siripuxi (also known as Tsiripu, Siripu)
      - Mayaraxi (also known as Mariposo, Mayalero)

Churuya is now extinct. It was formerly spoken in Meta, Colombia.

Macaguane is listed as a dialect of Guajibo in Kaufman (1994) and Campbell (1997). Gordon (2005) lists Playero (also Rio Arauca Guahibo), a dialect of Guajibo, as a separate language with a "low intelligibility of other Guahibo".

Guajibo and Cuiva form a dialect continuum.

Guajibo has the most speakers (over 23,000) and is the largest indigenous group in eastern Colombia. Approximately 9,000 in Venezuela.

Guayabero is the most divergent language of the family.

== Genetic relations ==
Guajiboan has often been grouped together with Arawakan, Arauan, and Candoshi by many classifiers. However, this now seems unlikely as the similarity between Guajiboan and Arawakan has been attributed to language contact.

== Language contact ==
Jolkesky (2016) notes that there are lexical similarities with the Yanomami, Arawak, Nadahup, Puinave-Kak, Bora-Muinane, and Choko language families due to contact.

Meléndez-Lozano (2014) has also noted that Guahiban has borrowed from Arawakan languages, especially the Achagua and Piapoco languages.

An automated computational analysis (ASJP 4) by Müller et al. (2013) found that there are apparent lexical similarities with Yanomami and Ticuna-Yuri. However, since the analysis was automatically generated, the similarities could be either due to mutual lexical borrowing, genetic inheritance, or chance resemblances.

== Proto-language ==
Proto-Guajiboan
- Proto-Guahiban
- Reconstruction of: Cariban languages

Below are Proto-Guahiban reconstructions by Christian and Matteson (1972):

Proto-Guahiban reconstructions by Christian and Matteson (1972)

no.	gloss	Proto-Guahiban
1.	'abdomen'	*-khoto(-wita)
2.	'Adam's apple'	*-kuaY(-bo-kará/batɨ)-to
3.	'agouti'	*bɨnɨ, *bɨNɨ
4.	'all'	*daxɨ́-ta
5.	'anaconda'	*homo-wábi
6.	'ant'	*pɨbɨ
7.	'ant'	*kha-kha-ra-wa
8.	'anteater'	*tsóNi (pre-Guahiban)
9.	'arm'	*-ma-xi/xa-si-pa-to
10.	'armadillo'	*tahaú-bi
11.	'arrow'	*pú/ku-yani (pre-Guahiban)
12.	'ash'	*i/a-pu-ma-na/Na
13.	'axe'	*sipá-li-a-
14.	'bad'	*a-béhe
15.	'bark'	*-bauko-
16.	'bat'	*hai-wi/si-ri-to (pre-Guahiban)
17.	'beard'	*-bixi/o-pina/piNa
18.	'bee (honey)'	*habi/bara-moNɨ
19.	'big'	*pinihí-yi/nV
20.	'bite'	*síne, *síNe
21.	'black'	*-tsaebía-hawa
22.	'blood'	*háNa
23.	'bow (n.)'	*bitsá-bi
24.	'breast'	*-mí-pa/pi-to
25.	'brush, woods'	*uéNu
26.	'buzzard'	*ké-ke-re
27.	'cane'	*mu/ba-se-bo
28.	'canoe'	*héra
29.	'capybara'	*húmo-ko-bi-to
30.	'chili pepper'	*noN-hi
31.	'chin'	*bɨxi-
32.	'cold'	*a-ke
33.	'come'	*patao-ho-pa
34.	'corn'	*hétsa
35.	'crocodile'	*makhiNe-he
36.	'cultivated clearing'	*pábi
37.	'curassow'	*iɨhɨ-bɨrɨ
38.	'day'	*mata-kái-bi
39.	'die'	*tɨpa
40.	'dig'	*kúa
41.	'doorway'	*bau-pha-ka
42.	'down'	*bé-reka
43.	'drink'	*ápa
44.	'dry'	*tséawa
45.	'dull'	*a-wóno-bi
46.	'ear (inner)'	*muxu/mi-Yó-lo/ri-to
47.	'earth'	*íra
48.	'eat'	*xáne, *xáNe
49.	'egg'	*tobɨ
50.	'eye'	*takhú
51.	'far'	*tahɨ
52.	'father'	*p-áxa
53.	'fear'	*ku-húnawa, *ku-húNawa
54.	'finger'	*ko-besí/tíya
55.	'fire'	*iso, nawa
56.	'firewood'	*íso
57.	'first'	*kopiaya-pita
58.	'fish'	*duhuaY
59.	'fish hook'	*kulupú-bo
60.	'flesh'	*-wúi
61.	'flower'	*-ma-tóNo-to
62.	'fly (n.)'	*dáina-, *dáiNa-
63.	'foot'	*tákhua
64.	'forehead'	*-ta-pa-thái-
65.	'fruit'	*bobo-kuí
66.	'full'	*wiNíka
67.	'fur'	*-ná-i
68.	'gourd'	*dére-bɨ
69.	'grease'	*-nasí-tsi-/-wa, *-Na-sí-tsi/wa
70.	'guan'	*kuYu-wi
71.	'hair'	*ma-ta-nao
72.	'hammock'	*buu
73.	'hand'	*-kóbe
74.	'he'	*khum-po-ni
75.	'hear'	*húme-tane, *húme-taNe
76.	'heart'	*-humata-bɨ-ɨthɨ-to
77.	'heavy'	*a-réwi
78.	'hen'	*wakará
79.	'here'	*hó-ta
80.	'his'	*pE-
81.	'hold'	*xáina, *xáiNa
82.	'hot'	*a-táhu-enik
83.	'house'	*bau
84.	'how'	*pa-kuénia, *pa-kuéNia
85.	'huge rocks'	*p-ĩbo-to
86.	'hummingbird'	*se-si-bá-ri/-u/-Ci-to
87.	'husband'	*-amuNa-to
88.	'husband'	*-pébi
89.	'I'	*xá-ni
90.	'iguana'	*matíbi
91.	'imperative'	*-ma
92.	'imperative'	*-re
93.	'in, at'	*-ta
95.	'intestines'	*-ɨ́nɨ
96.	'island'	*tuanái-to
97.	'jaguar'	*neúthɨ
98.	'kill'	*beaxú-a-ba
99.	'knee'	*-ma-ta-baókao
100.	'know'	*yapí-tane, *yapí-taNe
101.	'lake'	*púka
102.	'he down'	*rúka
103.	'lightning'	*Yáamaxɨ
104.	'lip'	*Ci-uphi-Yólo/ri
105.	'liver'	*pa-hapa-
106.	'long'	*a-pía
107.	'long hair'	*ã-ma-tao-ná-pia, *ã-ma-tao-Ná-pia
108.	'louse'	*talí
109.	'lower arm'	*ma-xi-sí-pa-pa
110.	'lower leg'	*sí-to
111.	'lungs'	*ka-fo-fóbi
112.	'macaw'	*máha
113.	'man'	*pébĩ
114.	'manioc'	*bawá
115.	'manioc flour'	*matsúka
116.	'many'	*na-wi-ta
117.	'miriti palm'	*ino-hóa-bo/to
118.	'monkey, howler'	*níhẽ
119.	'mosquito'	*wéasɨ
120.	'mother'	*p-éna
121.	'mouth'	*kui-bo-to
122.	'my'	*ta-x
123.	'my'	*taha-
124.	'name'	*-wɨ́-ni
125.	'near'	*imokhó-yo
126.	'neck'	*Ce-i-sí-to
127.	'new'	*ha-na-ha-wa, *ha-Na-ha-wa
128.	'night'	*meráwi
129.	'nose'	*phúmu
130.	'old man'	*perú-hu-ni/wa-yo
131.	'old woman'	*perú-hu-wa
132.	'one'	*kaé-haewa
133.	'otter'	*bohóNao-wi
134.	'our'	*wa-ha
135.	'our'	*pa-ta
136.	'paca'	*opheá-bi
137.	'paddle'	*ka-téna-pa, *ka-téNa-pa
138.	'parakeet'	*tsé-le/Ci-to
139.	'parrot'	*óNau
140.	'path, trail, road'	*nã-mue-to
141.	'pebbles'	*síki-ibo-to-xi/tiyo
142.	'white-lipped peccary'	*habítsa
143.	'collared peccary'	*tsamaú-li
144.	'people'	*híwi
145.	'piranha'	*kowára-bo
146.	'piranha'	*fe-le-le-va-
147.	'push'	*to-ró-/tá-ba
148.	'rain'	*éma
149.	'rattle'	*tsi-tsí-bu
150.	'rattlesnake'	*yaa-sí-to
151.	'red'	*tsobía
152.	'river, stream'	*méne, *méNe
153.	'river turtle'	*hála
154.	'root'	*-tabú-topa
155.	'rope'	*-amí-to
156.	'saliva'	*-i-óne, *-i-óNe
157.	'sand'	*tahita-atsa
158.	'see'	*tá-Ne/naɨ/ne-kota
159.	'seed'	*-xú-
160.	'sew'	*horáuka
161.	'she'	*pó-wa
162.	'shoulder'	*-wɨ/o-tá-kura
163.	'shoulder'	*kóf-ia/eri
164.	'sing'	*na-xɨ́ana, *na-xɨ́aNa
165.	'sit'	*éka
166.	'skin'	*pera-bo/i
167.	'sky'	*itá-bokhau
168.	'sleep'	*mahí-ta/teka
169.	'smell'	*tuxú-ne/na/Ne/Na
170.	'smooth'	*kóni-hai
171.	'snake'	*hómo
172.	'spider'	*khaumɨ-bɨ-to
173.	'split'	*waúkoba
174.	'stand'	*Núka
175.	'stick'	*náe-hava/wa-ta
176.	'stomach'	*kó-to/so-to/-ro
177.	'stone'	*ibó-
178.	'sun'	*húami-to
179.	'sweet potato'	*dáithi
180.	'swell'	*ya-hín/Na
181.	'tail'	*bosó-to
182.	'tapir'	*métsa-ha
183.	'termite'	*ophó
184.	'that'	*bahará-xua
185.	'their'	*pe-
186.	'their'	*pi-ha/yeníhi-
187.	'they'	*po-món/Nae
188.	'thick'	*aitayáɨ
189.	'thigh'	*-topa-thái
190.	'think'	*nahunatabi xáin/Na
191.	'this'	*xuá
192.	'thou'	*xámɨ
193.	'toad'	*busɨ-to
194.	'tobacco'	*tséma
195.	'tongue tip'	*e-bá-rɨ-to-kopi-a
196.	'tooth'	*-a-wáuno
197.	'toucan'	*tuikuékue
198.	'tree, stick'	*náe-hava, *hae-wa
199.	'upper back'	*-hu-ma
200.	'village'	*tómara
201.	'vomit'	*y/n-akába
202.	'walk'	*póna-pona
203.	'wash'	*ki-á-ta
204.	'water'	*mé-ra
205.	'we'	*waxái-tsi
206.	'when'	*detsa/eta-pao-kuín/Naehi
207.	'whip'	*détsa/éta hóta
208.	'wife'	*piha-wa
209.	'wind'	*hoibóa
210.	'wing'	*kúarau-fe
211.	'woman'	*pe-tíri-wa
212.	'worm'	*oro
213.	'wrist'	*kóbe-ya-vére/hóri-to
214.	'ye'	*pa-xá-mi
215.	'year'	*wái
216.	'your (pl.)'	*pa-n/Ne-
217.	'your (sg.)'	*ni-hi

== Bibliography ==
- Adelaar, Willem F. H.; & Muysken, Pieter C. (2004). The languages of the Andes. Cambridge language surveys. Cambridge University Press.
- Berg, Marie L. and Isabel J. Kerr. (1973) The Cuiva language: Grammar. Language Data, Amerindian Series, 1. Santa Ana, CA: Summer Institute of Linguistics.
- Campbell, Lyle. (1997). American Indian languages: The historical linguistics of Native America. New York: Oxford University Press. ISBN 0-19-509427-1.
- Greenberg, Joseph H. (1987). Language in the Americas. Stanford: Stanford University Press.
- Kaufman, Terrence. (1990). Language history in South America: What we know and how to know more. In D. L. Payne (Ed.), Amazonian linguistics: Studies in lowland South American languages (pp. 13–67). Austin: University of Texas Press. ISBN 0-292-70414-3.
- Kaufman, Terrence. (1994). The native languages of South America. In C. Mosley & R. E. Asher (Eds.), Atlas of the world's languages (pp. 46–76). London: Routledge.
- Keels, Jack. (1985). "Guayabero: Phonology and morphophonemics." In Ruth M. Brend (ed.), From phonology to discourse: Studies in six Colombian languages: 57-87. Language Data, Amerindian Series, 9. Dallas: Summer Institute of Linguistics.
- Queixalós, Francisco. (1988). "Presentación"; Diccionario sikuani–español: i-xiii. Bogotá: CCELA Universidad de los Andes. ISN 0121-0963. (in Spanish)
- Rivet, Paul (1948) "La famille linguistique Guahibo"; Journal de la Société des Américanistes XXXVII: 191-240. Paris. (in French)
