= Inuktitut-English Pidgin =

Inuit-based pidgin of Canada

- Native to: Eastern Canadian Arctic
- Era: until the 1960s
- Language family: Inuit-based pidgin

Language codes
- ISO 639-3: None (mis)
- Glottolog: None

Inuktitut-English Pidgin was an Inuit pidgin used as a contact language in Quebec, Labrador, and neighboring areas of the eastern Arctic. It consisted of uninflected Inuktitut word stems arranged in an English SVO order. Thus for Inuit takuvagit "I see you" was pidgin uvanga taku ivvit.
