= Playero language =

Guahiban language of South America

Playero
- Native to: Colombia and Venezuela
- Region: Arauca River
- Ethnicity: Playeros
- Native speakers: (244 cited 2000)
- Language family: Guahiban: Playero

Language codes
- ISO 639-3: gob
- Glottolog: play1240
- ELP: Playero

Playero is a Guahiban language spoken by about 244 people in Colombia and Venezuela. Speakers are somewhat acculterated and bilingual in Spanish. Playero adults use the language commonly, but it is not taught in schools.
