= Cuiba language =

Guahiban language of Colombia and Venezuela

Cuiba
- Native to: Colombia, Venezuela
- Region: Meta Casanare and Capanapara rivers (Colombia) Apure Division (Venezuela)
- Native speakers: 2,900 (2007–2008)
- Language family: Guahiban: Cuiba

Language codes
- ISO 639-3: cui
- Glottolog: cuib1242
- ELP: Cuiva
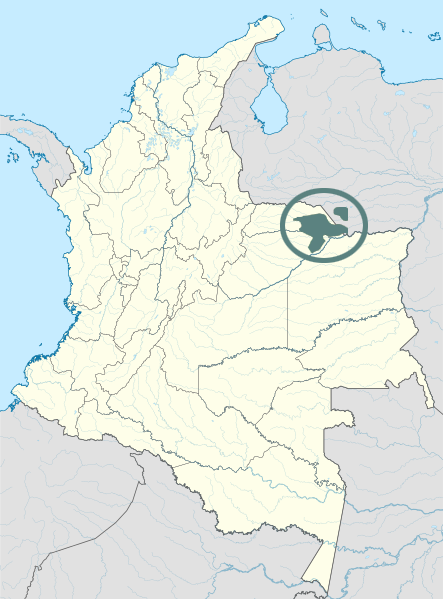

Cuiba or Cuiva is a Guahiban language that is spoken by about 2,300 people in Colombia and additional 650 in Venezuela. More than half of Cuiba speakers are monolingual, and in Colombia there is a 45% literacy rate. Cuiva is also referred to as Cuiba, Cuiba-Wámonae, Kuiva, Chiricoa, Hiwi, and Maiben. In Colombia, Cuiva is spoken among those who live and who are born surrounding the Colombian rivers, Meta Casanare and Capanaparo. The Cuiba ethnic group is often found in the Casanare Department. In Venezuela the language is spoken in the state of Apure, one of the states that border with Colombia, and which is found alongside the Capanaparo river.

== History ==
The term Cuiba is usually used to describe the ethnic group itself, although they do not refer to themselves as Cuiba. Most of those who speak the Cuiba language are monolingual, which is why the language is threatened seeing as the ethnic population itself is only approximately 2,950 and continues to decrease. The Cuiba ethnic group are characterized as being hunter-gatherers, who live a nomadic lifestyle in small bands along the borders of Colombia and Venezuela. Before 1967, the Cuiba were spread across the Meta River tributaries: Casanare, Agua Clara, Ariporo, Unchadia, Arauca, and Capanaparo. For the most part although the groups of Cuiba today are much smaller, they continue to occupy what is left of the areas around the rivers.

The banks of the Casanare, Agua Clara, Ariporo, Unchadia, Arauca, and Capanaparo are for the most part known as Cuiba territory and there has been no evidence stating that the Cuiba have occupied other territory but their own. The Cuiba have gone through many wars and invasions, which have slightly influenced Cuiba political and cultural practices at some point. Although the Europeans have left, some Spanish words survived. There is no evidence showing where the Spanish words were originated. There have been many attempts after the 1533 invasion attempting to remove the Cuiba from their territory, but although the Cuiba have a small population their culture has largely remained unchanged.

== Dialects ==
There are 8 dialects in Colombia and Venezuela known as:

- Chiricoa
- Masiware (Masiguare)
- Chiripo (Siripu, Wapiwi)
- Yara huuraxi-Capanapara
- Mayayero
- Monchuelo-Casanare-Cuiba
- Tampiwi (Mariposas)
- Amarawa (Amorua)

== Phonology ==
Consonants
		Bilabial	Alveolar	Palatal	Velar		Glottal	
		Bilabial	Alveolar	Palatal	plain	lab.	plain	lab.
Plosive	Tenuis	p	t		k	kʷ		
Plosive	Aspirated	pʰ	tʰ		kʰ			
Plosive	Voiced	b	d					
Affricate			ts	tʃ				
Fricative			s	ʃ	x		h	hʷ
Nasal		m	n	ɲ				
Rhotic			ɾ					
Approximant				j		w		

Vowels
	Front	Central	Back
Close	i	ɨ	u
Close-mid	e		o
Open-mid	æ	ʌ	
Open		a	

== Samples ==
- jihuij. People j.: There are people.
- dihuesij quequere: A story j the buzzard: This is a story about the buzzard.

== Bibliography ==
- Berg, Maria L. (1973). "Cuiba". Aspecto de la Cultura Material de Grupos Etnicos de Colombia. Vol. 1 (1st ed.). pp. 215–226.
- Berg, M. L.; Kerr, I. J. (1973). "Texts". The Cuiva Language: Grammar. Santa Ana, CA: Summer Institute of Linguistics. pp. 53–60.
- Menz, Alex. "Cuiba" (PDF). Database for Indigenous Cultural Evolution (DICE). University of Missouri. Archived from the original (PDF) on April 21, 2015.
- "Kuiva". Promotora Española de Lingüística (in Spanish).
