= Slavey Jargon =

Former trade language

Broken Slavey
- Slavey Jargon
- Native to: Canada
- Region: Yukon (Liard and Mackenzie rivers)
- Era: 19th century
- Language family: Slavey-based pidgin

Language codes
- ISO 639-3: None (mis)
- Glottolog: brok1250

Slavey Jargon (also Broken Slavey, Broken Slavé, Broken Slave, Broken Slavee, and le Jargon esclave) was a trade language used by Indigenous peoples and newcomers in the Yukon area (for example, in around Liard River and in the Mackenzie River district) in the 19th century.

== History ==
=== Input languages ===
Broken Slavey is based primarily on the Slavey language with elements from French, Cree, with minimal aspects of English, however, there is some disagreement among sources. Petitot (1889) states that Slavey Jargon lacks English, as well as Dene Suline (Chipewyan), or Gwich'in (Kutchin) elements, which is in contrast to the neighbouring Loucheux Pidgin (or Loucheux Jargon). On the other hand, Dall (1870) states that Slavey Jargon includes English elements and McClellan (1981) states that the language also contained Dene Suline influences. Later sources have ignored the earlier accounts and assumed that Slavey Jargon is merely French vocabulary (loanwords) used in northern Athabascan languages. Michael Krauss has suggested that French loanwords in Athabascan languages may have been borrowed via Broken Slavey.

=== Location ===
Broken Slavey was spoken along the Athabasca River, Mackenzie River, and sections of the Yukon River. It is a different trade language than the one that was spoken along the Peel (a tributary of the Mackenzie) and Yukon rivers; this other trade language in the region was called Loucheux Pidgin. Other contemporary sources as well as later sources do not make a distinction between Broken Slavey and Loucheux Pidgin, which may explain their inclusion of English, Dene Suline, and Gwich'in as influences on Broken Slavey.

=== Documentation ===
Broken Slavey has recently been documented with a few vocabulary items and phrases and only a little of its grammar and lexicon. However, more information may yet be discovered in archives through missionary records and traders' journals.

== Speakers ==
The native languages of speakers who used Slavey Jargon were Dene Suline, French, Gwich'in, Inuktitut, and Slavey. One notable speaker of Slavey Jargon was Antoine Hoole, a Hudson's Bay Company translator at Fort Yukon. Documentation has also shown that the language was spoken by a range of fur traders, postmasters, and their wives, sisters, and daughters, who were often of Métis descent.

The Gwich'in apparently stopped speaking the jargon in the early 20th century. The massive influx of English, brought in by the gold rush in 1886, was a "deathblow" for the language and it was no longer in common use by the 1930s. One speaker, Malcolm Sandy Roberts of Circle, Alaska, continued to use it in a diminished form until his death in 1983.

== Use ==
The best written historical documentation of Slavey jargon shows its actual use was for preaching the gospel and for teasing and harassing clergymen, and for interpersonal relationships. The use of Slavey Jargon can be characterized as an innovation employed by speakers in order to meet several linguistic goals, such as introductions, advice, and disputes. Mishler specified, "For all these reasons, Slavey Jargon seems inaccurate to characterize it strictly as a trade jargon" (p. 277).

== Structure ==
The nouns in the language generally consist of English, Chipewyan, and Slavey, whereas the verbs and pronouns are derived from French. Adverbs are typically pulled from Chipewyan and Gwich’in. There is, however, a lot of variation in Slavey Jargon. Gwich’in verbs can be mixed with French nouns or phonemically modified French sentences exist.

== Bibliography ==
- Bakker, Peter. (1996). Broken Slavey and Jargon Loucheux: A first exploration. In I. Broch & E. H. Jahr (Eds.), Language contact in the Arctic: Northern pidgins and contact languages (pp. 317–320). Berlin: Mouton de Gruyter.
- Bakker, Peter; & Grant, Anthony P. (1996). Interethnic communication in Canada, Alaska, and adjacent areas. In S. A. Wurm. P. Mühlhäuser, & D. H. Tryon (Eds.), Atlas of languages of intercultural communication in the Pacific, Asia, and the Americas (Vol. II.2, pp. ). Trends in linguistics: Documentation (No. 13). Berlin: Mouton de Gruyter.
- Campbell, Lyle. (1997). American Indian languages: The historical linguistics of Native America. New York: Oxford University Press. ISBN 0-19-509427-1.
- Dall, William H. (1870). Alaska and its resources. Boston: Lee and Shepard.
- Krauss, Michael. (1983). Slavey Jargon: Diffusion of French in Northern Athabaskan. [Manuscript]. Fairbanks: Alaska Native Language Center.
- McClellan, Catharine. (1981). Intercultural relations and cultural exchange in the Cordillera. In J. Helm (Ed.), Handbook of North American Indians: Subarctic (Vol. 6, pp. 387–401). Washington, D.C.: Smithsonian Institution.
- Mishler, Craig. (2008). 'That's a Rubbaboo': Slavey Jargon in a Nineteenth Century Subarctic Speech Community. Journal of Creole and Pidgin Languages 23(2): 264-287.
- Petitot, Émile. (1889). Quinze ans sous le Cercle Polaire: Mackenzie, Anderson, Youkon. Paris: E. Dentu.
- Slobodin, Richard. (1981). Kutchin. In J. Helm (Ed.), Handbook of North American Indians: Subarctic (Vol. 6, pp. 514–532). Washington, D.C.: Smithsonian Institution.
