= Algonquian–Basque pidgin =

Pidgin language last attested in 1711, in Canada

- Souriquois
- Region: Gulf of St. Lawrence
- Ethnicity: Basques, local Algonquian peoples
- Era: 16th to 18th century
- Language family: Basque-based pidgin

Language codes
- ISO 639-3: None (mis)
- Glottolog: basq1252
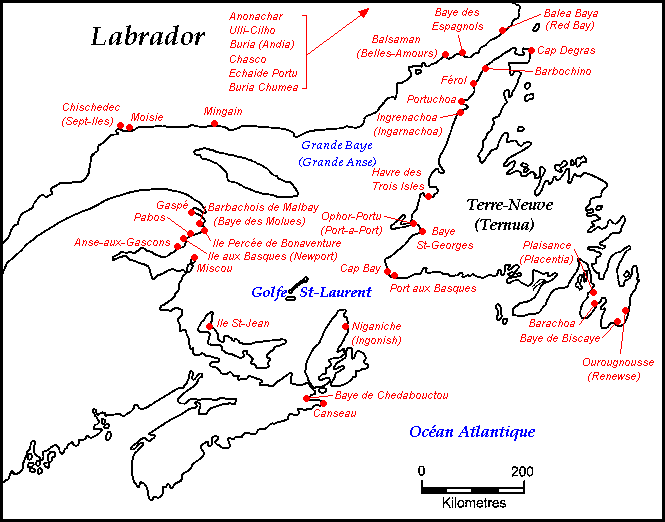
- Basque and Breton fishing sites in 16th and 17th centuries.

Algonquian–Basque pidgin, also known as Souriquois, is a Basque-based pidgin that linguist Peter Bakker proposed was spoken by ethnic Basque whalers and various Algonquian peoples around the Gulf of St. Lawrence; it was in use from at least 1580 until 1635, and was last attested in 1711.

There were three Indigenous groups distinguished by the Basques. They had good relations with the Montagnais and the St. Lawrence Iroquoians, while relations with the Inuit were often hostile. The Basque people historically referred to them as 'Esquimoas'.

== Historical background ==
=== Timeline ===
==== Early 16th century ====
- Basque fishermen began to visit North American coasts frequently. This allowed them to establish relationships with Indigenous tribes in the area. Some of these groups included the Montagnais, Mi’kmaq, St. Lawrence Iroquoians, and Inuit.

==== First contact and trade (1500s–1600s) ====
- Basque fishermen and whalers established trade with Algonquian tribes around the Gulf of Saint Lawrence. They engaged in the trade of otter, seal, and whale products for European goods such as metal tools, cloth, and liquor.
- Early 17th-century sources suggest that these interactions involved some form of pidgin language based on Basque, used by European traders to communicate with Indigenous peoples.

==== Early 17th century ====
- Marc Lescarbot provided a Mi’kmaq word list, sharing words of which he believed are of Basque origin or resemble Basque words. This shows signs of contact and language borrowing.
- The Algonquian-Basque pidgin, a simplified language that incorporates Basque vocabulary, was used among Basque traders and Indigenous communities. This was most seen along the North American coast.

==== Mid 17th century ====
- The Basque influence remained significant at least until the mid 17th century, without any confirmed evidence of a French pidgin prior to that period.
- Contact between Indigenous peoples and Basque fishermen was still ongoing. There was documented evidence of a Basque-derived trade language being in use, especially along the St. Lawrence River and in Newfoundland and Labrador regions.
- Some Basque words were eventually borrowed into Mi'kmaq, which are still in use today, reflecting the linguistic influence of Basque.

== Vocabulary ==
The vocabulary of the Algonquian-Basque Pidgin reflects characteristics of lexical borrowing, morphological simplification, and phonological adaptations, showing its potential as a trade lingua franca.

=== Origin and nature of vocabulary ===
The pidgin lexicon is primarily derived from Basque, with additional borrowing from Romance languages such as Portuguese, Spanish and French alongside Algonquian languages.

- Basque influence provided the morphological framework, which included specific suffixes.
- Romance influence introduced loanwords for trade, religion, and maritime life.
- Algonquian languages contributed geographically specific words along with other lexicons to lead everyday interaction.

Some examples include:

- captaine ("captain"), caban ("hut") - European domestic terms
- mouschcoucha (Basque or Romance for "large bird")
- macharoa ("bird") (possibly from Spanish pájaro or Portuguese pássaro)

This shows how the Algonquian-Basque Pidgin was created for practical purposes, such as communication and trade, rather than for full grammatical development.

=== Morphological markers from Basque ===
Two Basque morphemes dominate the Algonquian-Basque Pidgin structure:

- -a, Basque definite article. This is used broadly to make nouns regardless of origin.
- -koa, Derived from Basque locative, -ko + -a, can mean "from" or "of".

An example of this is canada → canadaquoa, (canada + -ko + -a) forming a noun meaning "the one from Canada".

French orthography recorded this ending as -ois, reflecting a different phonetic rendering in early records.

=== Phonological and orthographic simplification ===
The Algonquian-Basque Pidgin shows systematic phonological adaptation, reducing complex Basque phonetics to easier forms for non-Basque speakers:

- Vowel shifts (i, o → u), ezpata → echpada
- Nasalization simplification in borrowed terms (e.g. maria from balia)
- Variability in consonant representation (ch, sh, sc being used interchangeably)

These phonetic changes and spelling variety promote ease of pronunciation across linguistic groups.

=== Evidence of borrowed and mixed lexis ===
The pidgin includes and incorporates loanwords and hybridized forms from multiple different sources, including Basque, Romance, and Algonquian languages.

- Basque words appear in Algonquian languages today with slight phonetic changes. This shows possible lexical borrowing. (e.g. atorra → altlai, "shirt", or errege → elege, "king")
- Some words recorded by Jaques Cartier and later explorers have unclear etymologies, showing the words as neither solely Basque nor Algonquian. This points to the possibility of mixed lexical changes.

This borrowing pattern shares a dynamic lexicon adapted for commerce and daily communications.

Summary of vocabulary features
Feature	Example	Linguistic source
Romance + European Loanwords	captaine ("captain"), caban ("hut")	Lexical Borrowing
Basque morphemes -ko, -a	canadakoa, (canada + -ko + -a)	Definite Article/Locative
Phonological Shifts	ezpata → echpada	Vowel Shifts
Basque word borrowing in present-day Algonquian	altlai, "shirt"; or elege, "king"	Lexical Borrowing
Mixed lexical changes	Mixed or unknown etymologies	Hybrid Words

== See also ==
- Basque–Icelandic pidgin
