= Achagua language =

Arawakan language of Colombia

Achagua
- Achawa
- Native to: Colombia
- Region: Meta Department
- Ethnicity: Achagua people
- Native speakers: (250 cited 2000)
- Language family: Arawakan: Northern; Upper Amazon; Western Nawiki; Piapoko; Achagua
- Dialects: ?Ponares †

Language codes
- ISO 639-3: aca
- Glottolog: acha1250 Achagua pona1251 Ponares
- ELP: Achagua
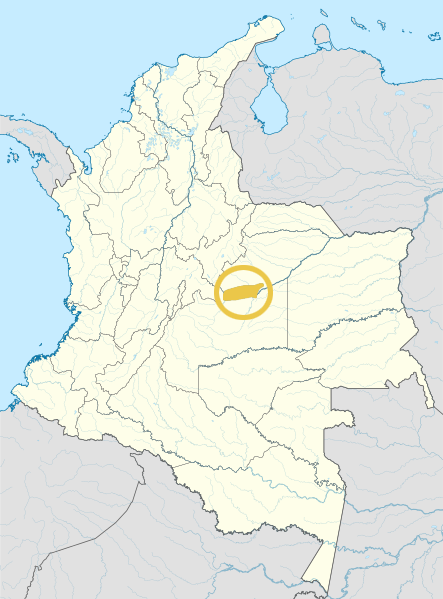

- Achagua is classified as Severely Endangered by the UNESCO Atlas of the World's Languages in Danger.

Achagua, or Achawa (Achagua: Achawa), is an Arawakan language spoken in the Meta Department of Colombia, similar to Piapoco. It is estimated that 250 individuals speak the language, many of whom also speak Piapoco or Spanish.

"Achagua is a language of the Maipurean Arawakan group traditionally spoken by the Achagua people of Venezuela and east-central Colombia."

A "Ponares" language is inferred from surnames, and may have been Achawa or Piapoco.

There is 1–5% literacy in Achagua.

== Phonology ==
=== Consonants ===
		Labial	Dental/ Alveolar	Retroflex	Palatal	Velar	Glottal
Plosive/ Affricate	voiceless	p	t		tʃ	k	
Plosive/ Affricate	voiced	b	d				
Nasal		m	n				
Fricative			s̪		ʝ		h
Trill			r				
Approximant		w		ɭ			

- /n/ is realized as [ɲ] when preceding palatal consonants.
- /k/ is palatalized [kʲ] when preceding /i/.
- Sounds /b, d/ are preglottalized [ˀb, ˀd] within accented syllables or after accented syllables.
- /b/ is realized as [β] when occurring intervocalically.
- /w/ is realized as [β] when preceding /i/.
- /s̪/ is realized as [ʃ] when preceding /i/.
- /ʝ/ is heard as an affricate [dʒ] in word-initial positions. It can also be realized as a glide [j] freely in intervocalic positions.
- /ɭ/ can be heard as a flap [ɾ] in free variation before /i/.

=== Vowels ===
	Front	Central	Back
High	i		u
Mid	e		o
Low		a	

== Vocabulary ==
English	Spanish	Achagua
One	Uno	Báque
Two	Dos	Chámai
Three	Tres	Matálii
Four	Cuatro	Kuátru
Five	Cinco	Abakáahi
Black	Negro	Kachajulai
Canoe	Canoa	Íida
Dog	Perro	Áuli
Father	Padre	Nusálihina
Man	Hombre	Washiaáli
Moon	Luna	Quéerri
Mother	Madre	Nutúwa
Sun	Sol	Cáiwia
Water	Agua	Shiátai
White	Blanco	Kabalai
