= Guahibo language =

Language spoken in Colombia and Venezuela

Guahibo
- Sikuani
- Jiwi jume
- Native to: Colombia, Venezuela
- Region: Casanare, eastern Meta, Vichada, Guaviare, Guainia states (Colombia); Orinoco River (Venezuela)
- Ethnicity: Guahibo people
- Native speakers: (34,000 cited 1998–2001)
- Language family: Guahiban: Guahibo

Language codes
- ISO 639-3: guh
- Glottolog: guah1255
- ELP: Guajibo
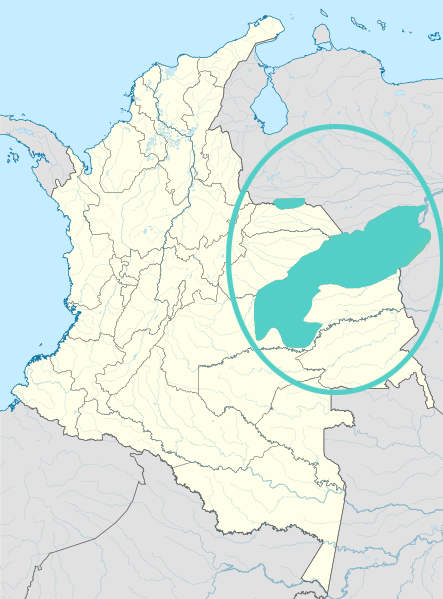

Guahibo, the native language of the Guahibo people, is a Guahiban language that is spoken by about 23,006 people in Colombia and additional 8,428 in Venezuela. There is a 40% rate of monolingualism, and a 45% literacy rate.

== Phonology ==
Consonants
		Bilabial	Dental	Alveolar	Palatal	Velar	Glottal
Plosive	plain	p ⟨p⟩	t̪ ⟨th⟩	t ⟨t⟩		k ⟨k⟩	
Plosive	voiced	b ⟨b⟩		d ⟨d⟩			
Fricative		ɸ ⟨f⟩		s ⟨s⟩		x ⟨j̈/x⟩	h ⟨j⟩
Trill				r ⟨r⟩			
Affricate				t͡s ⟨ts⟩			
Nasal		m ⟨m⟩		n ⟨n⟩			
Lateral				l ⟨l⟩			
Approximant		w~β ⟨w⟩			j ⟨y⟩		

A /w/ sound can also range to a [β] sound within words.

Vowels
	Front	Central	Back
Close	i ⟨i⟩	ɨ ⟨ü/ë⟩	u ⟨u⟩
Mid	e ⟨e⟩		o ⟨o⟩
Open		a ⟨a⟩	

Sounds /a, e/ can have allophones of [ə, ɛ]. Vowels can also be nasalized as /ã, ĩ, ẽ, õ, ũ, ɨ̃/.

== Writing system ==
Guahibo alphabet (Kondo 1985)
Uppercase	A	B	C	D	E	Ë	F	I	J	L	M	N	O	P	Q	R	S	T	Th	Ts	U	W	X	Y
Lowercase	a	b	c	d	e	ë	f	i	j	l	m	n	o	p	q	r	s	t	th	ts	u	w	x	y

Unified Guahibo alphabet (1986)
a	b	d	e	f	i	j	j̈ (x)	k	l	m	n	o	p	r	s	t	tj	ts	u	ü	w	y

== Grammar ==
=== Stress ===
Guahibo has a unique and complex stress system with both primary and secondary stress. The stress system shows a sensitivity to syllable weight so that heavy syllables are always stressed. Both contrasting trochaic and iambic patterns are found on morphemes in nonfinal morphemes with more than two syllables:

Trochaic	Iambic
('LL)('LL) mátacàbi "day"	(L'L)(L'L) tulíquisì "bead necklace"

The binary feet are parsed from left to right within each morpheme. Morphemes with an odd number of syllables leave the final syllable unstressed (and unparsed into feet):

Trochaic	Iambic
('LL)L wánali "crystal"	(L'L)L wayáfo "savannah"
('LL)('LL)L pàlupáluma "rabbit"	(L'L)(L'L)L culèmayúwa "species of turtle"

Morphemes that consist of two syllables and are also word-final are an exception to the above and only have the trochaic pattern:

Trochaic	Iambic (with reversal)
('LL) náwa "grass fire"	('LL) púca "lake"

These morphemes alternate with an iambic pattern when placed in a nonfinal context. Thus náwa keeps its trochaic pattern with the addition of a single light syllable morpheme like -ta "in":

náwa + -ta → náwata ('LL)L

However, an iambic word show its underlying iamb when it is followed by -ta:

púca + -ta → pucáta (L'L)L

Affixation generally does not affect the stress pattern of each morpheme.

Heavy syllables since they are required to be stressed disrupt perfect trochaic and iambic rhythms. However, morphemes with a sequence of at least two light syllables show contrasting stress patterns:

Trochaic	Iambic
('LL)('H) nónojì "hot peppers"	(L'L)('H) jútabài "motmot"

Primary Stress. Primary stress generally falls on the rightmost nonfinal foot. For example, the following word

(ˌLL)(ˈLL)L (pà.lu).(pá.lu).ma "rabbit"

has primary stress on the rightmost foot (pa.lu) which is not word-final. However, the rightmost foot (qui.si) in

(LˈL)(LˌL) (tu.lí).(qui.sì) "bead necklace"

is word-final and cannot receive primary stress; the primary stress then falls on the next rightmost foot (tu.li). Placing a light syllable suffix -ta "with" after a four syllable root shows shifting of primary stress:

(LˈL)(LˌL) tsapánilù "species of turtle"
(LˌL)(LˈL)L tsapànilúta "with the turtle"

With the addition of the suffix, the root-final foot (ni.lu) is no longer word-final and is subsequently permitted to accept primary stress.

== Bibliography ==
- Kondo, Riena. (1984). Notas sobre la fonología guahiba. Sistemas fonológicos de idiomas colombianos, 5, 205–211.
- Kondo, Riena. (1985). Contribución al estudio de longitud vocálica y el acento en el idioma guahiba. Artículos en lingüística y campos afines, 13, 55–82.
- Kondo, Riena. (1985). El guahibo hablado: Gramática pedagógica del guahibo (Vols. 1–2). Lomalinda, Colombia: Instituto Lingüístico de Verano.
- Kondo, Riena. (1985). Long vowels and stress in Guahibo: From phonology to discourse. In Language data: Amerindian series (Vol. 9, 43–56). Dallas: Summer Institute of Linguistics.
- Kondo, Riena. (2001). Guahibo stress: Both trochaic and iambic. International Journal of American Linguistics, 67 (2), 136–166.
- Kondo, Victor; & Kondo, Riena. (1967). Guahibo phonemes. In Phonemic systems of Colombian languages (pp. 89–98). Norman, OK: Summer Institute of Linguistics.
- Kondo, Victor; & Kondo, Riena. (1972). Fonemas del guahibo. Sistemas fonológicos de idiomas colombianos, 1, 93–102.
- Mosonyi, Esteban Emilio. (1964). Contribución el estudio de la fonémica: Idioma Guajibo. Economía y Ciencias Sociales, 6, 93–103.
- Queixalós, Francisco. (1985). Fonología Sikuani. Bogotá: Insituto Caro y Cuervo.
- Queixalós, Francisco (1988). Diccionario sikuani-español. Universidad de los Andes.
