= African Urban Youth Languages =

African Urban Youth Languages is an umbrella term for languages formed and spoken in the urban areas of Africa that have resulted from language contact in their populations that has been caused by migration into cities in the latter part of the 20th century. It encompasses languages such as Camfranglais, Indoubil, Lingla ya Bayankee, Nouchi, Sheng, and Engsh. There is some degree of linguistic prejudice against calling these languages, but they are not pidgins nor creole languages. They have been variously named "urban vernaculars" or "urban youth languages" in linguistic literature, although the name African Urban Youth Language, coined for a linguistics conference in Cape Town in 2013, has come to be the accepted name, not least because of the simplicity of its acronym AUYL.

== Broad terminology ==
The language classification here encompasses slangs and argots. In general, the label is applied by linguists based upon the language speakers' evident intents to create a linguistic identity of their own.

Similarly, the youth classification does not mean that only the young speak the language, but rather that the languages are founded in the sort of rebelliousness found in the young against the established, "standard", languages. They qualify for being what Michael Halliday termed, in 1978, antilanguages. From the perspectives of the speakers of standard languages they are indeed as Halliday said "oblique, diffuse, and metaphorical", and give the appearance of being exclusionary of those speakers. But from the perspectives of the AUYL speakers themselves, they are rather seen as the better reflection of the admixed culture and reality around them, with its distorted globalizations, anti-colonial identity, and cosmopolitan nature, than the established languages of more historic colonial settings. AUYLs are for their speakers means of rejecting tribalism and elitist colonialism, even though for non-speakers they may be markers of immorality and low status.

Further militating against the literal youth designation is the natural process of AUYL speakers retaining the languages as they have grown older. The anti-language status was already diminishing at the end of the 20th century as languages like Sheng and Nouchi became more widespread, and the norm, in the urban populations in general.

== Common features ==
One of the common features of AUYLs is that their speakers often are polyglots, and the languages are not created out of a need for a common language to bridge a communications gap. More subtly, though, they are neutral languages that have no strong ties to one specific ethnicity, and so bridge an ethnicity gap. In contrast to European urban youth languages, where this bridging is done by speakers for whom the admixed languages often have second language status, in AUYLs the speakers are usually primary language speakers of the admixed languages.

Another is that almost all of their names are endonyms — they have not been named by outsiders. This is in contrast to youth languages from outside of Africa, where languages like Multicultural London English and Kiezdeutsch are named in other languages.

Some of the derivations of the names are:

- Indoubil is named from Hindou and Bil, and implies the identity of an Indian version of Buffalo Bill.
- Nouchi's name comes from "nun sii", literally "nose skin", and implies "moustachioed tough guy".
- The name Camfranglais is a portmanteau of Cameroun, français, and anglais, i.e. Cameroon's mixture of French and English.
- Lingala ya Byankee is the language — "Lingala" — of Yankees, meaning American cowboys.
- Sheng is Swahili and English. Although there is an alternative endonymic derivation that it is metathetized English to Lisheng, with the Li- prefix then analysed as an unnecessary Bantu prefix that should be removed.
- Tsotsitaal is the taal (language) of the tsotis (city slickers).

Borrowing from English is also common, as is applying metathesis to borrowed words (from English, French, and elsewhere) as a form of symbolic rebellion against the "normal" world's straightforward ways of borrowing. This opposition to the norm also leads to rapid linguistic drift, as any adoption into a standard language of the forms of an AUYL is a strong motivator to its speakers to change the AUYL so that it continues to be marked as anti-normal.

Whilst multiple languages are not only mixed through a form of code switching between individual words in a sentence and even mid-word as affixes from one language are applied to (sometimes clipped) words from another, the grammatical structures of the languages are largely taken from a single base language: e.g. Swahili for Indoubil and Sheng, English for Engsh, and Afrikaans for Tsotsitaal.

The lexical changes and admixtures are not employed via a slower random language change process, but deliberately as a means of differentiation. They comprise metathesis; clipping, possibly with the addition of dummy affixes such as "-o"; (Note: There are even some direct equivalencies to English such as the Sheng futi for football having the Sheng dummy suffix -i where English applies a phonetically similar -y suffix (after similar clipping) to yield footy. Sheng also has besti for (clipped) "best friend" where English applies -ie to generate bestie.) changing initial consonants; applying foreign grammatical affixes, sometimes with different functions; and stretching semantics. Some examples:

- In French-based AUYLs one can find the use of English gerund -ing and plural -s suffixes applied to French words.
- Conversely, AUYLs in Francophone parts of Africa apply French suffixes such as the agentive -eur, feminine -esse, and adjectival -al to non-French words.
- Similarly, the French infinitive suffix -er is stretched (Note: as indeed also occurs in some varieties of African French) into a general suffix for verbalizing any noun.
- The nominalizing -ya from Jula can be found applied to English and French nouns or even noun phrases merged into a single word.
- Other dummy affixes can be found such as meaningless nasalization prefixes of n- and infixes of -m- to apply a Bantu flavour to words, and o- to give a Luo flavour.

Some of the things that distinguish AUYLs from other language forms such as professional jargons are the general absences of archaisms, paraphrasing, and composition.

== See also ==
- German youth language
- Kanak Sprak
