= German youth language =

Linguistic patterns associated with young German speakers

German youth language or Youth Communication (German: Jugendsprache pronounced [ˈjuːɡn̩tˌʃpʁaːxə]) describes the linguistic patterns and characteristics used by German adolescents. Speech patterns vary by age, era, and location. According to Helmut Glück (2005), the term is not strictly defined. Heinrich Löffler refers to Jugendsprache as a transitory non-standard language (German: Lebensalter-Sprache, lit. 'age-language') with attention to the time period. In German and West European philology, Jugendsprache is considered to be both a non-standard language and a sub-form of the standard language.

These characteristics and patterns can be categorized as typical or atypical. Orality and informal language are characteristics of German youth language. Researchers claim that its main function is achieving separation from adult speech and to signal group solidarity.

Language publisher Langenscheidt has designated the German youth word of the year annually since 2008, although there is some doubt whether the selected words are in actual use. The selections included terms like Gammelfleischparty ("spoiled meat party", a party for people over the age of 30) or lost (an English word used by Germans with a meaning identical to English).

== Groups ==
Researchers have described multiple groups/forms, including Comicdeutsch (German comic language), school language, Denglisch, army slang, university student language, drug scene jargon, graffiti jargon, hip-hop jargon and Internet jargon. Most of these forms are not restricted to teenagers, though teenagers are the instigators and primary speakers.

== Features ==
Youth language displays exaggerations, emphasis, exaggeration, intensification, wordplay, provocation, humor, irony, playfulness, expressiveness and emotion more often than is found in adult communication.

Speakers often use metaphors, e.g., "natural woolly socks" for "hairy legs".

Abbreviations are common, such as "so’nem" instead of "so einem". Youth are more likely to import Anglicisms, for example, "cool" is typical. Acronyms such as "YOLO" ('You only live once'), have increased in frequency, to condense text messages.

Syntactic variations in spoken language include repetitions, ellipsis, word order variation and incomplete sentences. Filler words such as "und so" (and so on), and interjections and hedges (e.g., irgendwie), are typical.

== Research ==
Researcher-curated dictionaries/style guides create an always-dated image of youth language that misses the way young people actually speak, because that youth language evolves too quickly to be reflected in formal research. Most expressions are short-lived. For example, knorke was once used an expression of high approval. Later, astrein, cool, nice, and geil, often enriched with further emphatic forms (oberaffengeil), emerged.

== See also ==
- Jargon
- Kanak Sprak
- Internet slang
- Youth word of the year (Germany)
- Youth slang

== Sources ==
- Androutsopoulos, Jannis (2000): Vom Mainstream-Radio bis zu den Skatermagazinen. Jugendmedien sprachwissenschaftlich betrachtet. Jugend und Medien. (Hg. vom JFF – Institut für Medienpädagogik in Forschung und Praxis). medien+erziehung 44/4. München, 229–235.
- Augenstein, Susanne (1998): Funktionen von Jugendsprache in Gesprächen Jugendlicher mit Erwachsenen. In: Androutsopoulos, Jannis: Jugendsprache. Langue des jeunes. Youth language. Linguistische und soziolinguistische Perspektiven. Frankfurt/Main (u. a.), 167–195.
- Hadumod Bußmann (Hrsg.): Lexikon der Sprachwissenschaft. 3. aktualisierte und erweiterte Auflage. Kröner, Stuttgart 2002, ISBN 3-520-45203-0 (Artikel: Jugendsprache).
- Helmut Glück (Hrsg.), unter Mitarbeit von Friederike Schmöe: Metzler Lexikon Sprache. 3., neu bearbeitete Auflage. Metzler, Stuttgart/Weimar 2005, ISBN 3-476-02056-8 (Stichwort: „Jugendsprache").
- Helmut Henne: Jugend und ihre Sprache. Darstellung, Materialien, Kritik. de Gruyter, Berlin/New York 1986. ISBN 3-11-010967-0.
- Theodor Lewandowski: Linguistisches Wörterbuch. 4., neu bearbeitete Aufl. Quelle & Meyer, Heidelberg 1985. ISBN 3-494-02050-7. Artikel: Jugendsprache.
- Eva Neuland: Jugendsprache in der Diskussion: Meinungen, Ergebnisse, Folgerungen. In: Rudolf Hoberg, Karin Eichhoff-Cyrus (Hrsg.): Die deutsche Sprache zur Jahrtausendwende. Sprachkultur oder Sprachverfall? Dudenverlag, Mannheim/ Leipzig/ Wien/ Zürich 2000, ISBN 3-411-70601-5, S. 107–123.
- Eva Neuland: Jugendsprache. Eine Einführung. A. Francke Verlag (UTB für Wissenschaft), Tübingen 2008, ISBN 978-3-8252-2397-7; 2. überarbeitete und erweiterte Auflage, 2018, ISBN 978-3-8252-4924-3.
