= Public image of Angela Merkel =

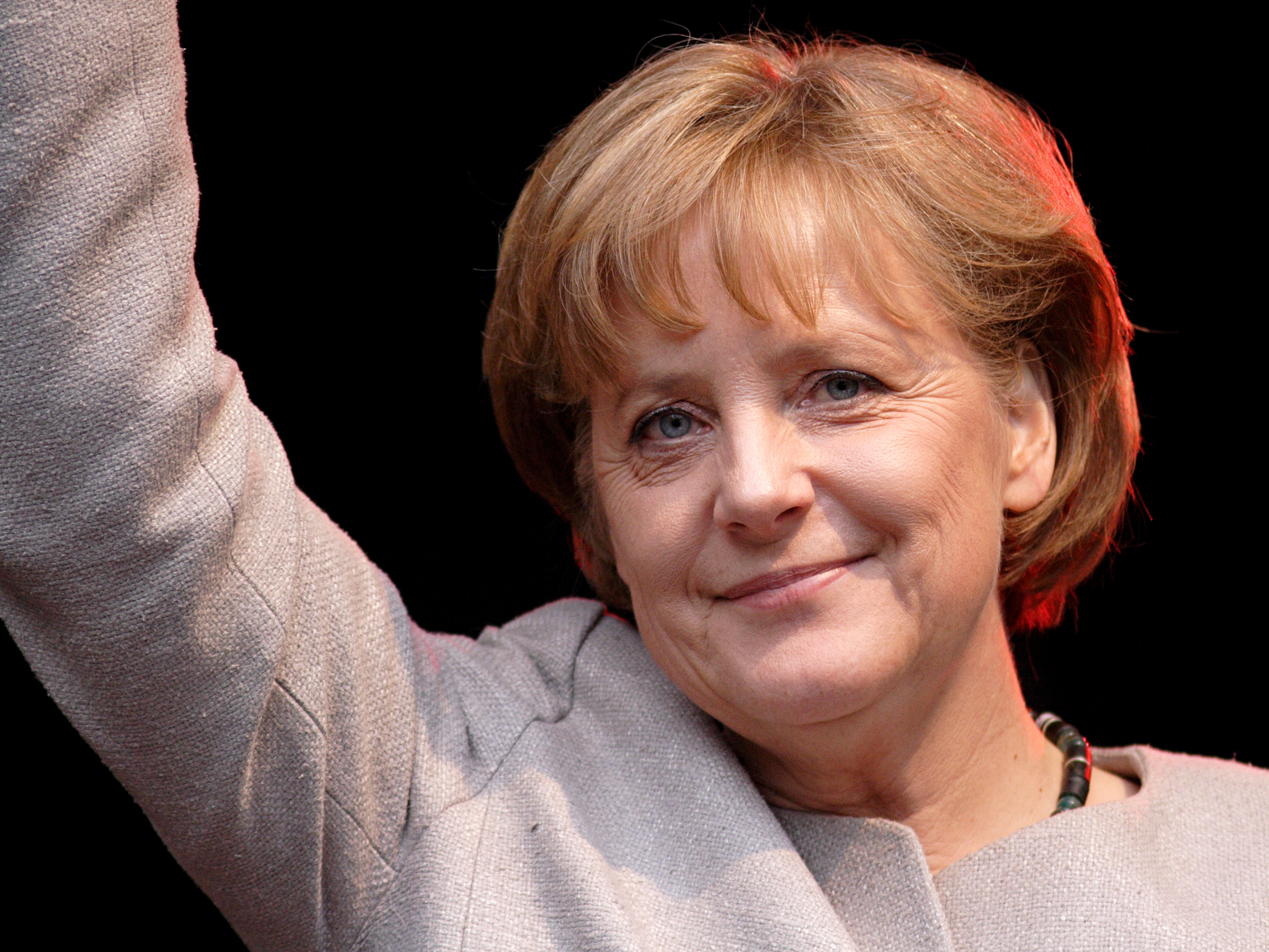
Angela Merkel in 2008

Angela Merkel was elected as the Chancellor of Germany in 2005 and reelected in 2009, 2013, and 2017. She has received numerous accolades, including being named Time magazine's Person of the Year in 2015, ranking first in Forbes' Power Women 2020, and fourth in their Powerful People list in 2018. Merkel has also been awarded several honorary doctorates, such as from Harvard University in May 2019. Holding a doctorate in quantum chemistry earned in 1986, Merkel became the first female and first East German Chancellor of Germany in 2005. She is often referred to as "Mutti Merkel" or Mother Merkel, a nickname suggesting a motherly image, which is attributed to her leadership style in Germany. This article explores Angela Merkel's identity, life experiences, and the significant events that have influenced her public image.

== Background and identity ==
=== As a migrant ===
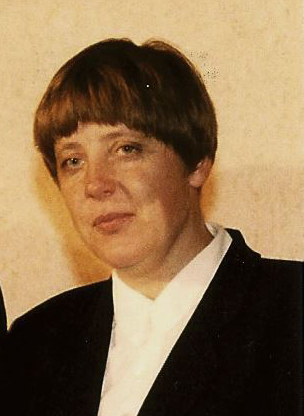
Dr. Angela Merkel in 1995

Merkel, born in 1954 in Hamburg, Germany, experienced a childhood shaped by the geopolitical tensions of the Cold War era. Her family relocated from West Germany to the Deutsche Demokratische Republik (DDR) during this period. Merkel has described her upbringing in East Germany as 'comfortable,' despite the limited personal freedoms under the regime. Throughout her career, Merkel has navigated discussions surrounding her East German background, sometimes emphasizing or downplaying her identity as an 'Ossi,' a term used by West Germans to refer to individuals from the East. Scholars suggest that Merkel's experiences growing up in the DDR, including concerns about surveillance by the Stasi, may have influenced her diplomatic approach and ability to maintain neutrality in political matters.

=== A preacher's daughter ===
Merkel, influenced by her Protestant upbringing through her father, a pastor, displayed a frugal lifestyle and a tendency to work behind the scenes in her early political career. Observers note her approach in navigating complex political decisions, particularly during the 2015 refugee crisis, where she led Germany to accept a significant number of refugees. This decision has been viewed by some as an example of Merkel balancing moral considerations with political pragmatism.

=== As a scientist ===
Merkel, before the political phase of her career, pursued an education in physics at the Karl Marx University (now the University of Leipzig), where she graduated in 1978 with a degree in physics and physical chemistry. She furthered her studies by earning a Ph.D. in quantum chemistry in 1986. Merkel worked at the Academy of Sciences (‘Akademie der Wissenschaften’) from 1978 to 1990, during which she was among a minority of female researchers in her field. Her entry into politics occurred in her thirties, leveraging her scientific expertise in roles such as the Minister of Environment. Her scientific background has been regarded as beneficial, particularly during challenges such as the COVID-19 pandemic.

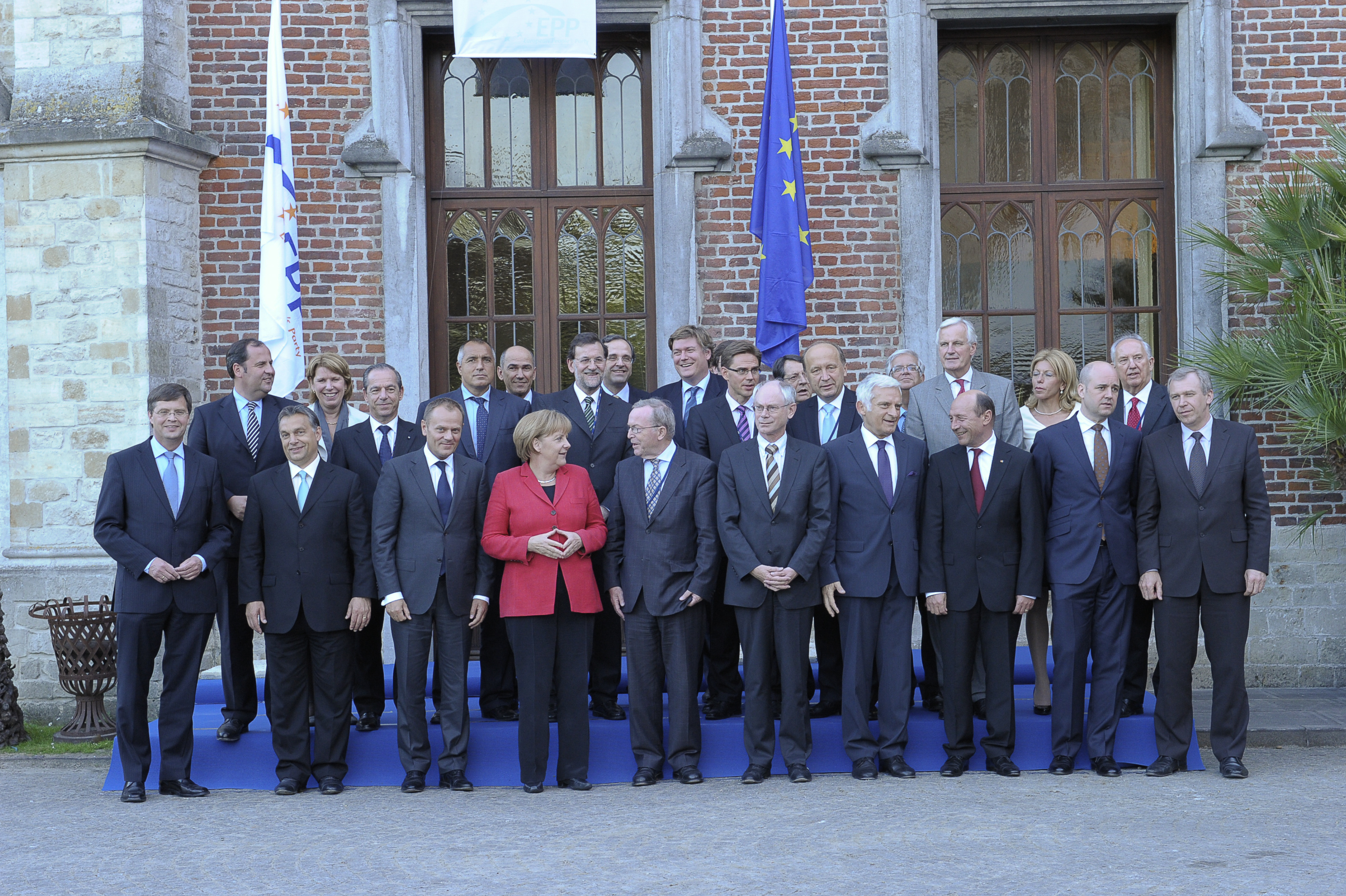
Merkel, in red, pictured with European leaders

=== As a woman in politics ===
When Merkel began her political journey in the 1990s, she was one of the first women in domestic politics seen in leadership positions. As she climbed the ranks in the CDU, she became known as Helmut Kohl's "little girl", despite her established career, drawing accusations of sexism. Merkel has historically shied away from talking about personal experience with gender discrimination and tried to avoid "running as a woman". Still, regardless of how Merkel frames herself, the public hasn't hesitated to draw conclusions based on her gender. Some believe that certain media coverage of Merkel reflects sexist attitudes, including an analysis of her hairstyles and wardrobe. Since Merkel stepped down as the CDU party leader, she has become more vocal on women's issues, including the gender pay gap and representation in politics. Merkel refused to declare herself a feminist for most of her career. She finally chose to self-identify as such in a 2021 interview with Chimamanda Ngozi Adichie.

== Political image ==
Merkel joined her party, the Christian Democratic Union (CDU), a center-right party when Germany was first reunited. She served as the Minister of Women and Youth (1991–94), Minister for Environment (1994–98), and the CDU Chair (2000-2018). She won her first term as a Chancellor in 2005 and won three campaigns in 2009, 2013, and 2018. For comparison, Merkel has continued to lead Germany through four US Presidents, five UK Prime Ministers, four French Presidents, and seven Italian PMs. Merkel's years in leadership were marked by financial, institutional, immigration, and public health crises. Despite the tumultuous times, she has continued to symbolize stability and sanity for Germany and the world. As of January 2021, Statistica reported 84% approved of Angela Merkel's overall leadership and work as Chancellor. Merkel will leave her office with a legacy of consistently thoughtful leadership, giving Germany a favorable position in the new world order, being the first female and first East German elected as Chancellor. The following section will detail Merkel's political image.

=== Mutti Merkel ===
Since Angela Merkel's first election as Chancellor of Germany in 2005, her role and influence have notably increased. Merkel, often referred to by the moniker 'Mutti Merkel' (Mother Merkel), has been perceived as a figure of reliability and trustworthiness. This nickname, which originated as a somewhat derogatory term from her opponents, implying a 'nagging mother' stereotype, was later adopted by her party and supporters as a mark of respect and affection. Merkel's tenure is characterized by her centrist approach to policy-making, guided by what has been described as a moral compass in times of crisis. Her leadership style has varied according to different challenges; for instance, she demonstrated a more stringent approach during the 2009 Euro Crisis. Conversely, during the 2015 Refugee Crisis, Merkel's policies were noted for their emphasis on humanitarian and compassionate responses.

=== ‘Merkeln’ ===
Angela Merkel's tenure as Chancellor of Germany has been marked by various characteristics, one of which has been perceived by some as indecisiveness or a cautious approach to forming and expressing opinions. This perception became so prominent that the term ‘Merkeln’ was coined in German, becoming the ‘Jugendwort’ (Youth Word) of the year in 2015. While this characterization suggests a critique of her leadership style, it also reflects the cautious consideration Merkel applied in evaluating the consequences of her actions.

== Notable events ==
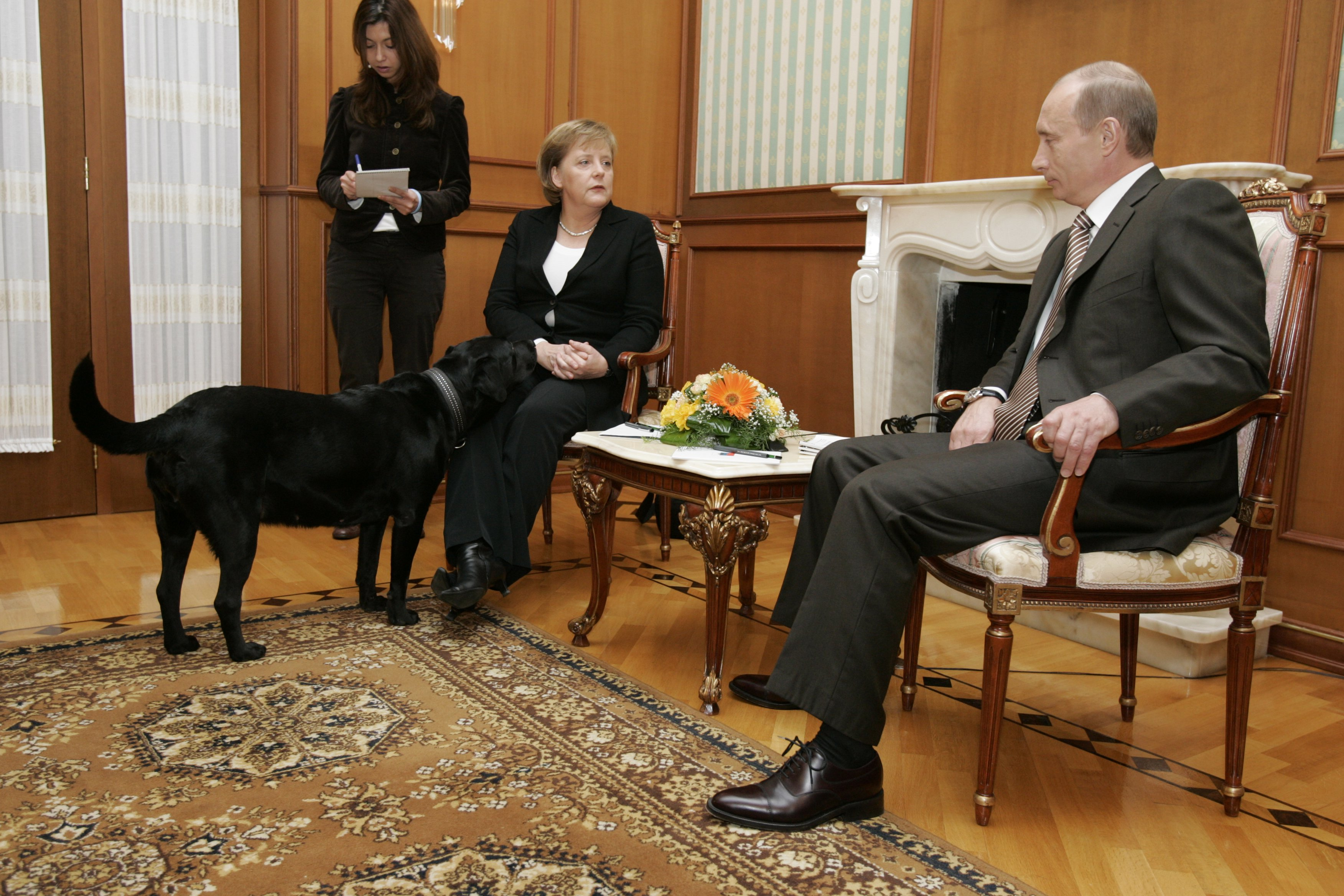
2007 Merkel meeting with Putin and Koni, Putin's dog

=== 2007 meeting with Putin ===
The two leaders met to discuss energy supplies in 2007 in Sochi. The event should have been unremarkable however the dynamic changed when the Russian President invited Koni, his 8-year-old Labrador Retriever dog, to join the two. Merkel has a known fear of dogs and was visibly uncomfortable in the situation. Her reaction is what caught the attention of reporters; the Chancellor responded to Putin saying "It doesn’t eat journalists, after all." After the event she took control of the narrative; "I understand why he has to do this – to prove he’s a man. … He’s afraid of his own weakness. Russia has nothing, no successful politics or economy. All they have is this."

In November 2024, Putin stated that he didn't know she was afraid of dogs, and wanted to create a favorable atmosphere for the conversation. He also asked for forgiveness from her by saying, "Angela, please forgive me, I did not want to cause you any heartache...If you ever – I realize it is unlikely – come again, I will not do it under any circumstances."

=== 2009 eurozone crisis ===
The euro area crisis posed a significant challenge during Angela Merkel's first term as Chancellor of Germany. Several Eurozone countries struggled to independently manage their government debts, which risked destabilizing the entire zone. In response, the European Union deliberated on appropriate measures to prevent further financial deterioration, with intense discussions centered around the structure of the "bailout" package. During this period, Merkel's leadership extended beyond national interests to encompass broader European concerns. Her approach, influenced by her background in science, involved careful deliberation and assessment of the complex situation.

Merkel faced criticism for her handling of the Greek bailout package, which opposed austerity measures and seemingly favored the German banking sector. Her delayed response to the crisis has been noted by scholars as a factor that worsened the financial situation in Greece and the Eurozone.

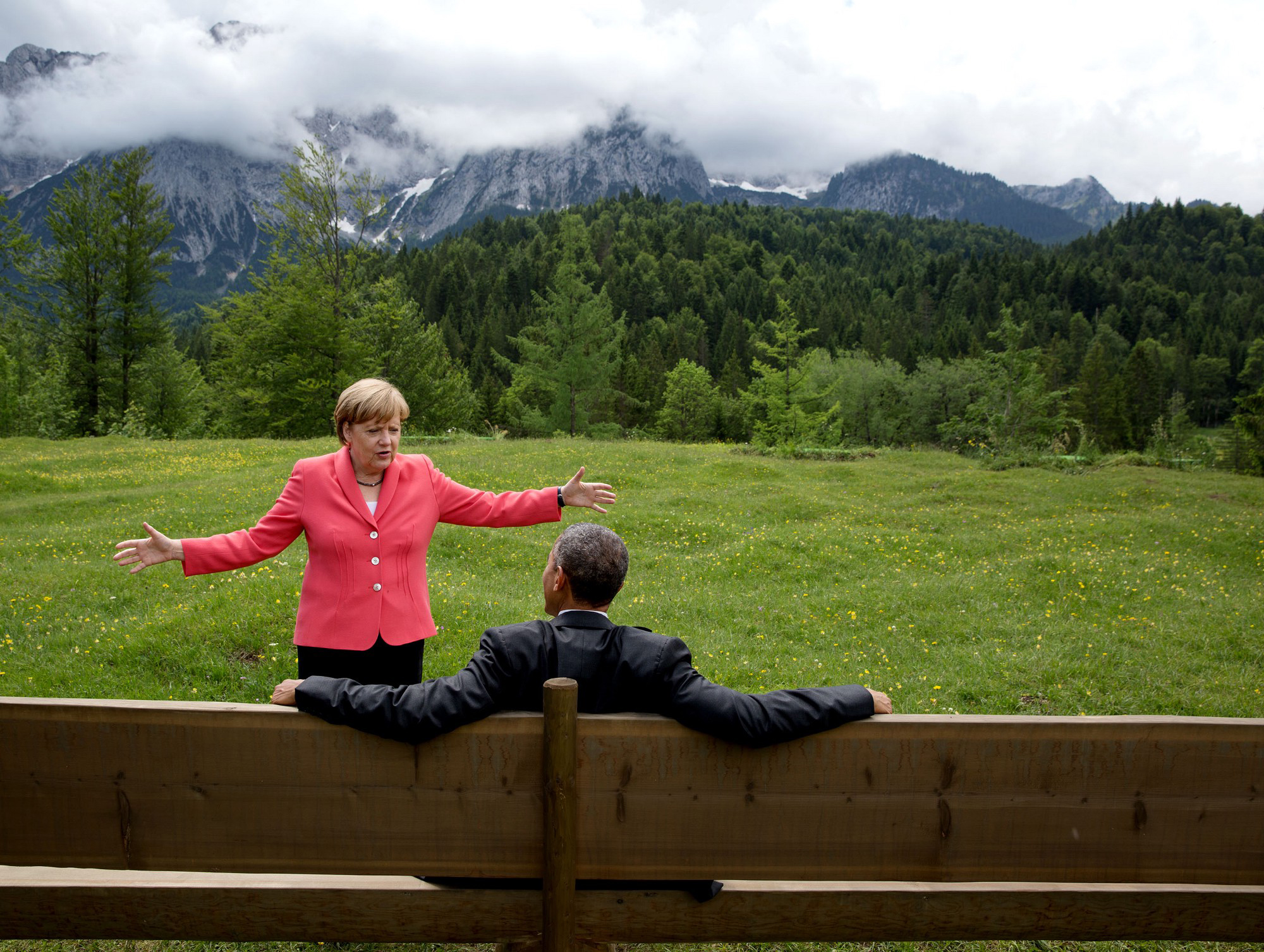
Merkel and Obama's relationship continued after the NSA scandal.

=== 2013 NSA spying ===
In 2013, reports indicated that the US National Security Agency under President Obama had hacked and spied on European leaders, including the Chancellor herself. Obama reportedly connected with Merkel directly and assured her the allegations were completely false. The outrage in Europe was present, and Merkel was quoted saying, "spying among friends - that simply isn't done." The event hits close to home for Merkel, growing up in East Germany during the Cold War, where spying on friends was a common fear. She is reported to have reminded Obama of this fact stating, "we're not in the Cold War anymore". The event did not prevent the two leaders from working together, but it inspired proposals for EU legislation against the transfer of digital data between Europe and America.

=== 2015 Person of the Year ===
Time magazine announced Angela Merkel Person of the Year as the "Chancellor of the Free World". This award came in Merkel's 10th year in office, a year marked by political and humanitarian turmoil. Greece was on the verge of bankruptcy again, and the number of refugees fleeing to the shores of Europe had grown to an uncontrollable scale. A reported 911,000 refugees made the journey in 2015 alone, fleeing civil war, conflict, and poverty mainly from Afghanistan, Syria, and Iraq. As countries started to close their borders, Merkel committed to accepting one million refugees with her famous words "wir schaffen das" or "we can do this" even as her popularity dropped. The Chancellor faced criticism throughout the EU where a Hungarian spokesperson said, "the Germans think they’re the Americans of Europe." Time magazine noted that Merkel's leadership during the crisis was influenced by her background both as a migrant from former East Germany and her religious upbringing, which acted as a moral compass that favored humanity over political popularity. Her fast action to welcome the refugees is what the magazine evaluated for the 2015 title. Time concluded their nomination of Merkel writing, "Merkel’s legacy—her bold, fraught, immensely empathetic act of leadership—challenges more than the comfort of European life."

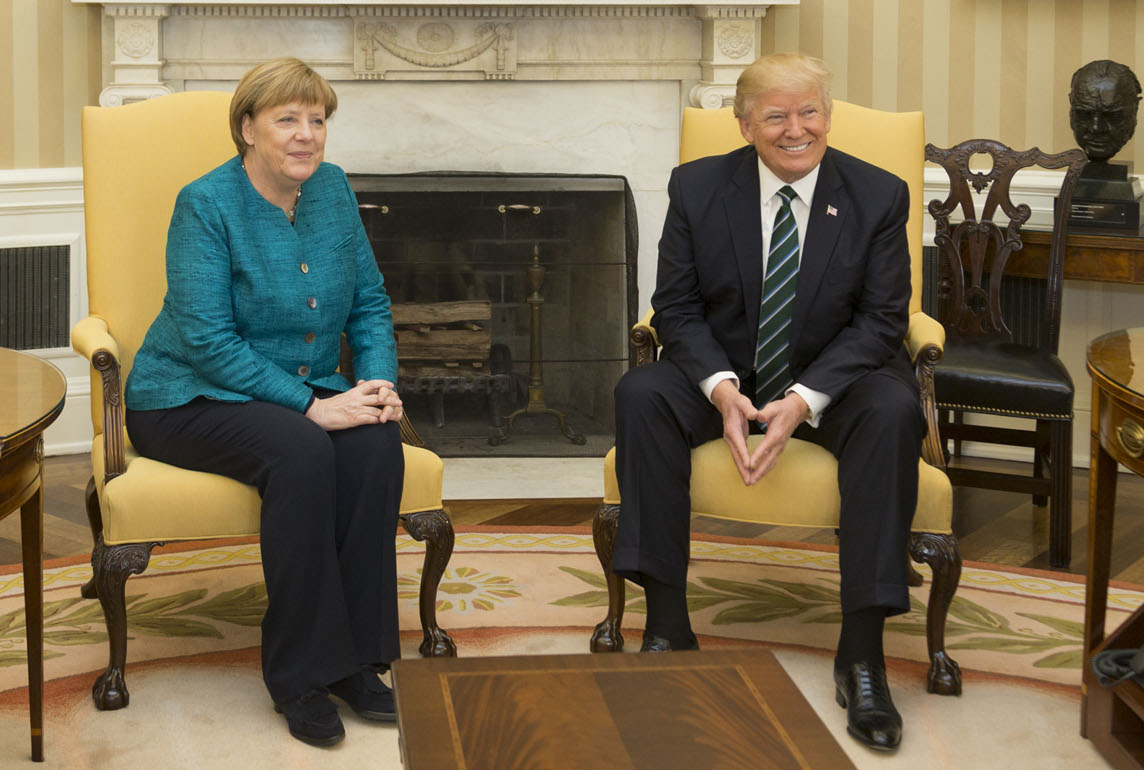
2017 Merkel and Trump Meeting in Oval Office

=== 2017 meeting with Trump ===
In March 2017, Angela Merkel visited the White House for the first time during Donald Trump's presidency, a meeting that drew significant attention due to the contrasting views of the two leaders on transatlantic relations. The encounter in the Oval Office was closely analyzed, with body language experts commenting on the perceived awkwardness. A notable moment occurred when reporters requested a handshake photo; Merkel appeared to extend her hand, while President Trump did not immediately respond. The interpretation of this interaction has been subject to debate, fueling speculation about the future dynamics of their relationship. However, this incident did not visibly impact Merkel, who has extensive experience in international diplomacy, having met with multiple U.S. Presidents. Her approach to global leadership has focused on seeking cooperation and maintaining diplomatic relations, a stance underscored by her own words, "I seek cooperation rather than confrontation.

=== 2020 Covid crisis ===
Angela Merkel's background in science has been a notable aspect of her approach to managing the COVID-19 pandemic. Since the virus reached Germany in early 2020, the Chancellor has held regular press conferences to disseminate information about the virus and its implications. In one notable instance, she explained the ‘R0’ factor, emphasizing her scientific expertise. Merkel holds a Ph.D. in quantum chemistry, a fact she referenced during this explanation. Throughout the pandemic, Germany has implemented cautious measures, including a strict lockdown since the resurgence of the second wave in the fall of 2020. Merkel's approach, which combines scientific reasoning with public engagement, has been a factor in her sustained approval ratings during this period.
