= Youth word of the year (Germany) =

Lexicographical award

The Youth word of the year (German: Jugendwort des Jahres) is an annual publication which reviews trends in German youth language and names one new or recently popularized word as the most noteworthy. The winning word is chosen by a jury under the guidance of publishing company Langenscheidt, who specializes in language reference works. The competition has run since 2008, with a one-year break in 2019.

== History ==
The selection of the youth word of the year is part of an annual publicity campaign for Langenscheidt's 100 Prozent Jugendsprache ("100 Percent Youth Language"), a dictionary of new and old expressions used by German-speaking young people. The competition stands in the tradition of word of the year assessments, the longest-running being the selection of the German word of the year by the Gesellschaft für deutsche Sprache (GfdS), which has been announced annually since 1977.

The first 'youth word of the year' was named in 2008. After Langenscheidt was bought by publisher Pons-Verlag in spring 2019, no youth word of the year was announced for that year, since the accompanying dictionary was not deemed to be ready. After some uncertainty about the future of the competition, 2020 saw a new edition of the youth word of the year, with the winning entry being decided in an online vote for the first time.

== Selection process ==
The public is invited to nominate words online, which are then narrowed down in a multi-step process. The jury has the final say over the winner and the runners-up; until 2020 there was no public voting and no formal inclusion of young people in the process. The criteria applied to the nominated words include 'linguistic creativity', 'originality', 'degree of proliferation', and 'societal and cultural events'.

== List of youth words of the year ==
Year	Rank	Words (winner in bold)	Direct translation	Explanation
2008	**1**	**Gammelfleischparty**	"spoiled meat party"	Party for people over the age of 30
2008	2	Bildschirmbräune	"screen tan"	Pallid skin color on habitual computer users
2008	3	unterhopft sein	"undersupplied with hops"	Being thirsty for a beer
2009	**1**	**hartzen**	"to hartz"	Being unemployed, 'hanging around'. Named after highly controversial reforms of the German labor market known as Hartz IV.
2009	2	bam	–	Variant of 'cool'
2009	3	Bankster	–	Compound of banker and gangster
2010	**1**	**Niveaulimbo**	"standards limbo"	Continuous slipping of standards, escalating parties, frivolous talk among young people
2010	2	Arschfax	"ass fax"	Accidentally leaving the clothes tag on underwear visible above other clothing
2010	3	Egosurfen	Egosurfing	Searching for one's own name in a search engine
2011	**1**	**Swag**	–	English-language slang word meaning stylish confidence
2011	2	(epic) fail	–	English-language slang for complete failure, often used as an interjection
2011	3	guttenbergen	"to guttenberg"	Commit (academic) plagiarism. Reference to the 2011 Guttenberg plagiarism scandal
2012	**1**	**YOLO**	–	Acronym of 'you only live once'
2012	2	FU!	–	Abbreviation of 'Fuck You!'
2012	3	Yalla!	–	From Arabic, meaning 'hurry up', 'let's go' or 'go away'
2013	**1**	**Babo**	–	From Zazaki, meaning boss or leader. Popularized by rapper Haftbefehl
2013	2	fame	–	Identical to English
2013	3	gediegen	"dignified"	Cool, nonchalant, debonair
2014	**1**	**Läuft bei dir**	"Things are going for you"	When a person has success or luck; 'you got it!'. Also used ironically
2014	2	Gönn dir!	"treat yourself"	'Have fun!'
2014	3	Hayvan	"animal"	From Turkish & Arabic, meaning a person that exhibits some degree of anti-social behaviour. Popularized with a somewhat positive connotation by rapper KC Rebell & Summer Cem
2015	**1**	**Smombie**	–	Portmanteau of smartphone and zombie, meaning persons so distracted by smartphone use that they barely acknowledge their surroundings
2015	2	merkeln	"to merkel"	Referring to Angela Merkel's style of governing, which is perceived to be overly cautious and marked by hesitant decision-making
2015	3	rumoxidieren	"to oxidize"	To chill out, relax, hang around; the only activity being breathing
2016	**1**	**fly sein**	"to be fly"	English-language slang meaning cool, awesome, stylish
2016	2	bae	–	Acronym of 'before anyone else'; best friend
2016	3	isso	"it is so"	Contraction of "es ist so"; affirmation, emphasis
2017	**1**	**I bims**	"It's me"	References common speech patterns in so-called 'Vong speak' (see Vong (Sprache))
2017	2	napflixen	"to napflix"	Portmanteau of 'napping' and 'Netflix'; having a nap during a movie
2017	3	tinderjährig	"of Tinder age"	To be old enough to be able to use dating platform Tinder; resembles the word "minderjährig" (being a minor)
2018	**1**	**Ehrenmann / Ehrenfrau**	"man/woman of honour"	Friendly person, gentleman
2018	2	glucose-haltig	"containing glucose"	Sweet; glucose as a simple form of sugar
2018	3	verbuggt	"buggy"	Defective, falling short of expectations. References bugs in engineering.
2019	none	–	–	No word was selected in 2019.
2020	**1**	**lost**	–	Identical to English
2020	2	cringe	–	Identical to English
2020	3	wild / wyld	"wild"	Situation or act that is 'too wild' and elicits strong emotions
2021	**1**	**cringe**	–	Identical to English
2021	2	sus	–	English-language slang meaning 'suspicious' or 'suspect', based on popular video game Among Us
2021	3	sheesh	–	Identical to English
2022	**1**	**smash**	–	Making a pass at someone, having sex; based on the game smash or pass?
2022	2	bodenlos	"bottomless"	Bad, crummy, appaling; used as intensifier for negative attributes
2022	3	Macher	"doer"	Someone who does things without hesitation
2023	**1**	**goofy**	–	English-language expression for a comical, foolish, uncoordinated person or act, which tends to amuse others
2023	2	side eye	–	English-language expression of skepticism or mistrust
2023	3	NPC	–	From 'non-player character', any character in a game that is not controlled by the player; someone who acts passively, lacks imagination, or is uncritical
2024	**1**	**aura**	–	Personal charisma, the impression a person makes on others; often used jokingly
2024	2	talahon	–	Young men engaging in behaviour perceived to be overly materialistic and characterized by toxic masculinity, especially those of a Arab background
2024	3	schere	"scissors"	Admitting a mistake, taking responsibility for an error; originated in live streaming and online gaming
2025	**1**	**das crazy**	"that crazy" [sic]	Deliberately ungrammatical form of 'das ist crazy' ('that's crazy'); used to demonstrate shock, surprise, speechlessness or disbelief
2025	2	goonen	"gooning"	Excessive/prolonged masturbation
2025	3	checkst du	"get it?"	Similar to "do you understand", also used to ask if someone emotionally relates to something
2026	**1**	**ragebait**	-	Identical to English
2026	2	peak	-	Identical to English
2026	3	crashout	-	Identical to English

== Criticism and discussion ==
A common criticism of the competition to find the 'youth word of the year' is that it is merely an elaborate advertising campaign for publisher Langenscheidt. Critics have also doubted whether the selected words are actually used by young people, especially since people of all ages can nominate words.

The Gesellschaft für deutsche Sprache called the competition a "nice idea", but GfdS' Lutz Kuntzsch added that he considered it "playing with language", and that he would not expect young people to actually use all or any of the nominated words.

Wolfgang Gaiser of the German Youth Institute said that the competition "is more about a publisher's marketing than social science about how young people speak and think. Using such shenanigans to generate attention for publications and find new readers is a clever marketing gag. [...] When silly phrases are given center stage, and it is implied that this represents the level of speech and thought of today's youth, then this paints a distorted picture."

=== 2009 ===
The word 'hartzen' was criticized for implying that unemployed people were lazy and were voluntarily living at the expense of the state.

=== 2015 ===
The phrase 'Alpha-Kevin', meaning 'the dumbest possible person' (referencing the phenomenon of Kevinism, a German prejudice against persons with certain trendy names), was removed from the competition because the jury felt it was discriminatory against real people with the name. Additionally, journalists doubted that the word 'Smombie' had seen actual usage, given that no mentions prior to the competition could be found, and a large majority of young people had never heard of it. Critics speculated that the word could be an invention of Langenscheidt.

=== 2020 ===
After Langenscheidt had decided to not crown a youth word of the year in 2019, the competition returned in 2020. The publisher had responded to criticism by giving more power to online users in the process. The publisher accepted nominations via its website, and the winning entry (the English word 'lost') was decided by online voting for the first time, rather than purely through a jury vote.

A minor controversy hinged on the nomination of the word 'Hurensohn' ('son of a whore', bastard), which was suggested en masse by the users of a German-language community on Reddit. The word had been part of a popular meme about speaking German. Responding to the flood of nominations, Langenscheid stated that 'Hurensohn' had been disqualified from the process because they would not consider expletives and slurs. However, the word was slated for inclusion in that year's annual dictionary of youth language.

== See also ==
- Word of the year (Germany)
- Word of the year

== Literature ==
- 100 % Jugendsprache 2019, Langenscheidt, Berlin 2018, ISBN 978-3-468-29884-4.
