= Heike Wiese =

German linguist

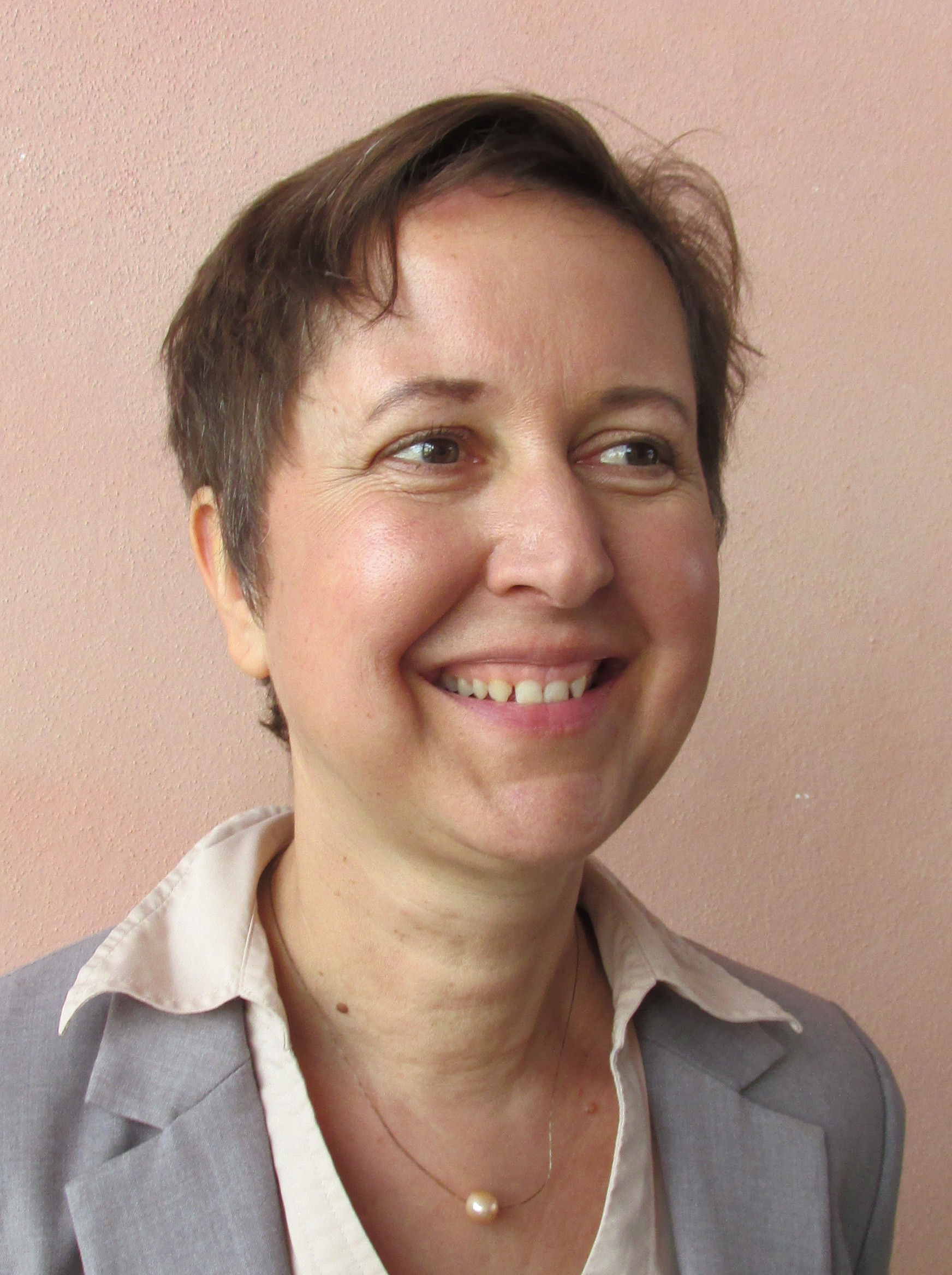
Wiese in Göttingen, 2014

Heike Wiese (born 1966) is a German linguist who is a professor of German in multilingual contexts at the Humboldt University of Berlin.

== Early life ==
Wiese was born during 1966 in Einbeck.

== Education, career and honours ==
Wiese studied German and philosophy at the University of Göttingen from 1985 to 1992. She received her doctorate in German linguistics from the Humboldt University of Berlin in 1997, and her Habilitation in German linguistics and theoretical linguistics from the same institution in 2003.

From 1998 to 1999 she spent six months as a visiting postdoctoral researcher at Brandeis University, and from 2005 to 2006 she spent ten months as a visiting associate professor at the linguistics department of Yale University; between 1993 and 2005 she was otherwise employed at the Humboldt University. In 2006 she was appointed Professor of Contemporary German Language at the University of Potsdam, a position she occupied until returning to the Humboldt University as professor in 2019.

In 2005 Wiese was the recipient of the Susanne K. Langer Award for Outstanding Scholarship in the Ecology of Symbolic Form, for her 2003 book on numbers, language and the human mind. In 2024 she was elected Member of the Academia Europaea.

== Research ==
Wiese's research deals with big-picture questions of the relationship between grammar and lexicon, the architecture of grammar, language contact and variation, language attitudes and language ideologies. She is known for her work on Kiezdeutsch, a variety of German spoken predominantly in multiethnic urban contexts in Germany; the controversy over whether Kiezdeutsch should be considered a dialect, as proposed by Wiese, received press coverage. Aspects of Kiezdeutsch she has investigated include verb-second and verb-third constituent order, numerals and mass nouns, grammatical particles and discourse markers.

== Selected publications ==
- Wiese, Heike. 2003. Numbers, language, and the human mind. Cambridge: Cambridge University Press. ISBN 9780511486562
- Wiese, Heike. 2003. Iconic and non-iconic stages in number development: The role of language. Trends in cognitive sciences 7 (9), 385–390. doi:10.1016/S1364-6613(03)00192-X
- Wiese, Heike. 2006. "Ich mach dich Messer": Grammatische Produktivität in Kiez-Sprache ("I do you knife": grammatical productivity in Kiez language). Linguistische Berichte 207, 245–273.
- Wiese, Heike. 2009. Grammatical innovation in multiethnic urban Europe: New linguistic practices among adolescents. Lingua 119 (5), 782–806. doi:10.1016/j.lingua.2008.11.002
- Wiese, Heike. 2012. Kiezdeutsch: Ein neuer Dialekt entsteht (Kiezdeutsch: a new dialect emerges). Munich: C. H. Beck. ISBN 9783406630347
