= Kanake =

German term for people with roots in Southeastern Europe, Middle East, and North Africa

Kanake (or Kanacke, Kanaa(c)k; pl. Kanacken or Kanaks/Kanax) is a German ethnic slur for non-Germanic-looking people, particularly those of Turkish, Italian, or Balkan origin.

It is also occasionally used to designate ethnic German working class people without a foreign background, particularly fans of football teams like Schalke 04 and others from the Ruhr region, who are referred to as "Ruhrpottkanaken". While it is primarily used in a derogatory manner, since the 1990s the term is also undergoing reappropriation.

== History of the word ==
The word is originally derived from the Hawaiian word kanaka meaning “person, human being” (from Proto-Polynesian *taŋata). Towards the end of the 19th century, the word Kanaka was used on the plantations of British colonies in the Pacific, referring to the workers who originated from various islands of Oceania.

Germans borrowed the term as Kanake, and assigned it a derogatory meaning referring to a broader array of populations. In the 1960s, the word was transferred with more ambiguous connotations to Southern European immigrants and the working class, it is now used with a strong derogatory connotation against people with roots in the "Orient" (including North Africa, the Middle East and Afghanistan).

The word has undergone some reappropriation since the 1990s, see e.g. Kanak Sprak.

== See also ==
- Talahon
- Kanaka (Pacific Island worker)
- Kanak people
- Wog
