= Bingo (folk song) =

Children's song about a farmer

Nursery rhyme
- Published: 1780
- Songwriter: Traditional

"Bingo" (also known as "Bingo Was His Name-O", "There Was a Farmer Had a Dog", or "B-I-N-G-O") is an English language children's song about a farmer's dog. Additional verses are sung by omitting the first letter sung in the previous verse and clapping instead of actually saying the letter. It has a Roud Folk Song Index number of 589.

== Lyrics ==
The contemporary version generally goes as follows:

There was a farmer had a dog,
and Bingo was his name-o.
B-I-N-G-O
B-I-N-G-O
B-I-N-G-O
And Bingo was his name-o.

There was a farmer had a dog,
and Bingo was his name-o.
(clap)-I-N-G-O
(clap)-I-N-G-O
(clap)-I-N-G-O
And Bingo was his name-o.

There was a farmer had a dog,
and Bingo was his name-o.
(clap)-(clap)-N-G-O
(clap)-(clap)-N-G-O
(clap)-(clap)-N-G-O
And Bingo was his name-o.

There was a farmer had a dog,
and Bingo was his name-o.
(clap)-(clap)-(clap)-G-O
(clap)-(clap)-(clap)-G-O
(clap)-(clap)-(clap)-G-O
And Bingo was his name-o.

There was a farmer had a dog,
and Bingo was his name-o.
(clap)-(clap)-(clap)-(clap)-O
(clap)-(clap)-(clap)-(clap)-O
(clap)-(clap)-(clap)-(clap)-O
And Bingo was his name-o.

There was a farmer had a dog,
and Bingo was his name-o.
(clap)-(clap)-(clap)-(clap)-(clap)
(clap)-(clap)-(clap)-(clap)-(clap)
(clap)-(clap)-(clap)-(clap)-(clap)
And Bingo was his name-o.

Though the first line is ungrammatical in standard English, using an apo koinou construction, it is nearly always sung with the lyrics as stated. The identity of Bingo is formally ambiguous, and it is occasionally suggested that it is the name of the farmer.

== Earlier forms ==
The earliest known dated version of the song is in the 1778 book "The Scots Nightingale: or, Edinburgh Vocal Miscellany", where it bears the heading "Little BINGO. To its own tune."

The farmer's dog leapt over the style,
His name was little Bingo,
The farmers dog leapt over the style,
His name was little Bingo.
B with an I, — I with an N, — N with a G, — G with an O;
His name was little Bingo:
B—I—N—G—O!
His name was little Bingo.

The farmer lov'd a cup of good ale,
He call'd it rare good Stingo,
The farmer, &c.
ST with an I — I with an N, &c.

And is not this a sweet little song? —
I think it is — by Jingo.
And is not, &c.
J with an I, — I with an N, &c.

The song was followed by another, less nursery-friendly one entitled "The Poet's Dog", sung to the same tune:

The poets dog ran down to hell,
His name was little Bingo;
He bark'd, and Cerberus gave a yell,
Which made all hell to ring—O!
R with an I, — I with an N, &c.

Old Charon took him by the tail,
And gave him a hellish swing—O,
Which made poor Bingo yelp and wail,
And yhowl like any thing—O.
TH with an I, &c.

Pluto with Minos did consult,
What should be done with Bingo;
But, I'm such an unlearned dolt,
I can't translate their lingo
L with an I, &c.

Minos to Pluto said,—"My Lord,
I'd hang him in a string—O:
But Charon heav'd him overboard,
And into Styx did fling—O
FL with an I, &c.

Thus Bingo swam a-shore alive,
And back to the earth did bing—O:
They run fast whom the de'il doth drive,
He flew like bird with wing—O.
W with an I, &c.

So Orpheus made on him a song,
The very song I sing—O;
If it is not good, 'tis not very long,
By Jupiter, and by Jingo.
J with an I, &c.

Another early reference to a form of the song is from the title of a piece of sheet music published about 1780, according to which the song was sung by William Swords, an actor at the Haymarket Theatre of London. Early versions of the song were variously titled "The Farmer's Dog Leapt o'er the Stile", "A Franklyn's Dogge", or "Little Bingo".

A nearly identical version of the song (without a title) dates from the 1785 songbook "The Humming Bird". A similar transcription exists from 1840, as part of The Ingoldsby Legends, the transcribing of which is credited in part to a "Mr. Simpkinson from Bath". This version drops several of the repeated lines found in the 1778 and 1785 versions and the transcription uses more archaic spelling and the first lines read "A franklyn's dogge" rather than "The farmer's dog". A version similar to the Ingoldsby one (with some spelling variations) was also noted from 1888.

The presence of the song in the United States was noted by Robert M. Charlton in 1842. English folklorist Alice Bertha Gomme recorded eight forms in 1894. Highly-differing versions were recorded in Monton, Shropshire, Liphook and Wakefield, Staffordshire, Nottinghamshire, Cambridgeshire, Derbyshire and Enborne. All of these versions were associated with children's games, the rules differing by locality. Early versions of "Bingo" were also noted as adult drinking songs, as in a version where individual singers were expected to sing a letter from the spelling of the name, and were to take a drink if they failed to do so correctly.

Variations on the lyrics refer to the dog variously as belonging to a miller or a shepherd, and/or named "Bango" or "Pinto". In some variants, variations on the following third stanza are added:

The farmer loved a pretty young lass,
and gave her a wedding-ring-o.
R with an I — I with an N,
N with a G — G with an O;
(etc.)

This stanza is placed before or substituted for the stanza starting with "And is this not a sweet little song?"

Versions that are variations on the early version of "Bingo" have been recorded in classical arrangements by Frederick Ranalow (1925), John Langstaff (1952), and Richard Lewis (1960). Under the title "Little Bingo", a variation on the early version was recorded twice by folk singer Alan Mills, on Animals, Vol. 1 (1956) and on 14 Numbers, Letters, and Animal Songs (1972).

The song should not be confused with the 1961 UK hit pop song "Bingo, Bingo (I'm In Love)" by Dave Carey, which originated as a jingle for pirate station Radio Luxembourg.
