= Kenyan English =

Local dialect of English spoken in Kenya

- Kiingereza cha Kenya
- Region: Kenya
- Language family: Indo-European: Germanic; West Germanic; Ingvaeonic; Anglo-Frisian; Anglic; English; British English & African English; Kenyan English
- Early forms: Proto-Indo-European: Proto-Germanic; Old English; Middle English; Early Modern English; 19th century British English
- Writing system: Latin (English alphabet); Unified English Braille

Official status
- Official language in: Kenya

Language codes
- ISO 639-3: –
- Glottolog: keny1281
- IETF: en-KE

Kenyan English is a local dialect of the English language spoken by several communities and individuals in Kenya, and among some Kenyan expatriates in other countries. The dialect contains features unique to it that were derived from local Bantu languages, such as Swahili.

== History ==
The English language was introduced to Kenya along with the United Kingdom's colonisation of Kenya in 1895, when the East Africa Protectorate was set up before becoming a colony in 1920. Swahili had been established as a trade language in most parts of the Swahili Coast at the time of colonization, and it was also used in education. The British reduced the influence of Swahili and made English the medium of instruction in Kenyan schools. English remained in official use after Kenya's independence on 12 December 1963. The official languages of Kenya are English and Swahili, with the latter also recognised as the national language. While English is not used as commonly as other native languages in Kenya, it is the primary language spoken in areas such as media, government and schools. Due to this, almost all Kenyans who have an educational background know some level of English.

== Phonology ==
Monophthongs of Kenyan English on a vowel chart.

Like English in most of England, Kenyan English is non-rhotic. Major phonological features include the loss of length contrast in vowels, the lack of mid central vowels as with British English, the monophthongisation of diphthongs and the dissolving of consonant clusters. The trap-bath split does not exist in Kenyan English.

Brief overview on Ligi Ndogo
This brief news report done on the Ligi Ndogo S.C. Academy provides good examples of the various phonological distinctions outlined in this section between Kenyan English and English spoken in other regions.

Those who do not speak English as a first language and/or live in rural areas in Kenya may also participate in "code mixing", which is the process of using words from a local language while speaking English. A common example of this in Kenya comes from using the word andyu while speaking English, which is used to agree with someone.

=== Consonants ===
Non-standard pronunciation of English words due to the interference of local Kenyan languages is popularly known in the country as "shrubbing", a word which in all its forms is itself prone to this occurrence. It has been noted that "shrubbing" is less likely with upper-middle and upper class citizens, or citizens who do not speak indigenous Kenyan languages and learned English as a first language. Therefore, people living in rural areas and/or those who learned English as a second language and are likely to have a heavier accent are more likely to "shrub". "Shrubbing" is done by replacing a word's consonant sound(s) with another or others of a similar place of articulation. For example, pronouncing river as liver and vice versa or pronunciation of 'sh' in sugar as 's'.

=== Vowels ===
Since English is commonly spoken as a second language in Kenya, Kenyans tend to follow the Swahili five-vowel system rather than the twenty-vowel system of English. The five-vowel system mainly consists of /a/, /e/, /i/, /o/, and /u/ and these vowels are never diphthongized like some English vowel sounds can be. For example, hat, hut, heart and hurt all use the vowel sound /a/ in Kenyan English.

== Grammar ==
The most evident grammatical features of Kenyan English are the omission of articles, the pluralisation of uncountable nouns, the avoidance of using the relative pronoun "whose" and using adjectives as nouns.

In Kenyan English, a large number of speakers tend to omit articles in words that would otherwise need them. For example, when ordering at a fast food restaurant, a person may say "give me burger" or "I want burger" instead of "give me a burger" or "I want a burger". Similarly, the article "the" in Kenyan English is often used in cases that would otherwise be deemed inappropriate, especially with uncountable nouns. A good example would be adding the article "the" to the uncountable noun "mud" (for example, I stepped in the mud on my way home.)

Some uncountable nouns such as "data", "equipment", "money", "property", "software" and "fruit" are also often pluralised in Kenyan English, but this is especially prevalent in the rural areas and among the lower and lower-middle classes.

- The file contained different types of datas.
- There's a lot of equipments being sold at the shop.
- Prize monies were on offer to competitors at the video game tournament last week.
- The government owns a lot of properties across all counties.
- You can download different softwares to your computer.

A very large number of Kenyan English speakers often use "My names are…" when introducing themselves instead of "My name is…". For example, a person named John Omondi would introduce himself by saying "My names are John Omondi" instead of "My name is John Omondi". This is especially prevalent in the rural areas and among the lower and lower-middle classes, but also depends on the ethnic origin of the speaker.

As mentioned before, there is a tendency to avoid the use of the relative pronoun "whose" in Kenyan English, where the use of the word would usually be replaced with "that". For example:

- The man whose car I bought went to Mombasa last week. → The man that I bought a car from went to Mombasa last week.
- The woman whose purse was stolen went to the police. → The woman that got/had her purse stolen went to the police.

== Spelling ==
In written English, Kenyans often use British English spellings instead of those in American English, such as –our instead of –or (e.g. "colour", "flavour"), –re instead of –er (e.g. "metre", "theatre"), –ogue instead of –og (e.g. "prologue", "catalogue") and –ce instead of –se (e.g. "defence", "offence"; noun/verb distinction between words such as "advice" / "advise" or "licence" / "license" is maintained). However, the use of –ize and –yze has become more frequent instead of –ise and –yse, although the latter is still more common. For example, more Kenyans have been known to write "criticize" and "paralyze" as well as "criticise" and "paralyse".

== Vocabulary ==
As Kenyans generally use British English, vocabulary in Kenyan English is very similar to that of British English. Common examples are "chips" ("french fries" and "fries" in American English), "crisps" or "crips" ("chips" in American English) and "football" ("soccer" in American English, although the use of the American term has become increasingly common).

Kenyan English often borrows vocabulary from local languages which would otherwise be difficult to translate to English, such as the Bantu term "ugali", the Swahili term "sukuma wiki" (collard greens) and Swahili term "matatu" (a minibus and common form of transportation). The wide use of Sheng in Kenya has also affected the vocabulary of Kenyan English speakers. White people in Kenya are often referred to as "mzungus" or "wazungus" (the word "mzungu" is Swahili for "white person"; its plural form is "wazungu"). Other borrowed terms include "pole pole" (Swahili for "slowly"; as a result some people also say "slowly slowly"), "Harambee" (a fundraising event), "nyama choma" (lit. "roast meat", typically goat or sheep), "nini" (a word that means "what"; also used when one forgets the name of something, like the British English "thingy", which is itself also widely used) and "fundi" (someone who makes, repairs, fixes or installs things for a living; e.g. a "fundi wa simu", someone who fixes mobile phones or other devices). Finally, most people in Kenya speak English as a second or third language, leading to the majority of individuals using a lot of direct translation.

Example vocabulary
Kenyan English	Standard British/American English
Are you getting me?	Do you understand what I'm saying?
Let me confirm.	Let me check.
I'm alighting.	I'm getting off the bus.
We've reached.	We're here.
We've reached.	We've gotten to our destination.
I gave him 20 bob.	I gave him 20 shillings.
Even me.	Me too.
It has refused.	It's not working.
It has refused.	It's stopped functioning.
Isn't it?	Isn't that right?
Isn't it?	Don't you agree?
I'm wearing slippers.	I'm wearing flip-flops.
Please add something.	Add some more money. (You're being stingy.) (Used by street vendors when negotiating transactions)
I have to survive.	Add some more money. (You're being stingy.) (Used by street vendors when negotiating transactions)
Buy me lunch.	Add some more money. (You're being stingy.) (Used by street vendors when negotiating transactions)
What religion are you?	What religion do you follow?
One of these fine days.	Some day.
One of these fine days.	Some time in the future.
Take tea and bread.	Have some tea and bread.
I'm starting a chama.	I'm starting a cooperative.
Me I want …	I want ….
Now you.	What's wrong with you/ What's your problem.

== Proverbs ==
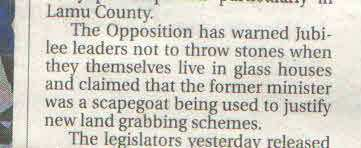
An example of the use of proverbs and idioms in Kenyan English (in this case standard English ones). From the front page of The Standard on 5 August 2014.

Some Kenyan English speakers occasionally use proverbs borrowed from Swahili and other languages, as well as English proverbs, when conveying the moral of a story or giving advice, and sometimes translate these proverbs to English. For example, when advising someone to take his/her time when doing something, a person may use the proverb "Haraka haraka haina baraka" (roughly translates to "more haste, less speed") and literally translate it to "Hurry hurry has no blessings".

== See also ==
- Sheng slang
- Engsh
- Commonwealth English
