= Talahon =

Social media trend

Talahon (German pronunciation: [ˈtaːlahoːn]) is a word associated with a German youth subculture that became popular on social media platforms in 2024. The term originally described young men of immigratory history, often being from a Muslim or Arab background. Talahon is also described as a neologistic word which has meanings from an ironic stereotype to a right-wing slur targeted towards immigrants. In the same year, the word was nominated as the Youth word of the year in Germany.

== Etymology and origin ==
The term "Talahon" does not have a fixed definition, but it is believed to derive from the Arabic phrase taʿāl lahōn (تعال لهون) meaning "come here". The earliest instance of the word came from a rap song by Hassan Annouri titled "Ta3al Lahon" in 2022 which featured the lyric "Tala' hon, ich geb dir ein Stich, ich bin der Patron." (Tala' hon, I'll give you a stitch, I'm the patron) Talahon regained popularity again in 2024, after an AI-generated music video, Verknallt in einen Talahon, reached the Top 50 most listened to songs in Germany.

== Meaning ==
Talahon describes young men, usually 14-to 25-years old migrants or people with migrant backgrounds, posing themselves as an exaggerated, masculine figure and wearing clothing that includes Gucci, Louis Vuitton, Balenciaga and other brand-name items and act aggressive and dominant.

== Criticism ==
While the usage of "Talahon" is mainly satirical and self-parodic, a number of concern was raised by multiple parties. Bild, a right-wing German tabloid, viewed it as a trend which is "Misogynistic, sexist, patriarchal and glorifying violence." Rapper Hassan has said, "A talahon must be respectful," claiming the lyrics in his song are an art form of the "streets". The term has also been used as derogatory remarks towards Arabs and Muslim by right-wing extremist and calling for them to be deported.

== See also ==
- Kanake
- Immigration to Germany
- Crime in Germany
- German hip-hop
- Toxic masculinity
