= Engsh =

Cant from the rich neighbourhoods of Nairobi, Kenya

Eng'sh /ɜⁿkʃ/ or Kenyanese /kɜɲaniːz/ is a cant in Kenya whose base language is English that includes borrowings from spoken urban Kenyan Swahili.

While Sheng, a mostly Swahili-based AUYL, is rooted in the poor eastern neighborhoods of Nairobi (where it has become a mother tongue), Engsh is English-based and is spoken in the more affluent Westlands area. It is "a youth register that keeps tabs on American slang and rap music", and sufficiently different from Sheng to be treated separately, according to linguist Erik Kioko.

In the past, there was no distinction made between Sheng' and Engsh. However, youth speakers of both languages noticed their inability to understand each other properly, as the languages had evolved differently primarily due to the different economic backgrounds. Nevertheless, there are still many similarities between Sheng' and Engsh, but Engsh is unique enough to stand as a cant of its own.

== Phonology ==
=== Consonants ===
		Labial	Dental	Alveolar	Postalveolar / Palatal	Velar	Glottal
Nasal		m		n	ɲ ⟨ny⟩	ŋ ⟨ng'⟩	
Stop	prenasalized	ᵐb̥ ⟨mb⟩		ⁿd̥ ⟨nd⟩	ⁿd̥ʒ̊ ⟨nj⟩	ᵑɡ̊ ⟨ng⟩	
Stop	voiced	b ⟨b⟩		d ⟨d⟩	dʒ ⟨j⟩	ɡ ⟨g⟩	
Stop	voiceless	p		t	tʃ ⟨ch⟩	k	
Fricative	prenasalized	ᶬv̥ ⟨mv⟩		ⁿz̥ ⟨nz⟩			
Fricative	voiced	v	(ð ⟨dh⟩)	z		(ɣ ⟨gh⟩)	
Fricative	voiceless	f	(θ ⟨th⟩)	s	ʃ ⟨sh⟩		h
Approximant	Median				j ⟨y⟩ ɹ〈r〉	w	
Approximant	Lateral			l			
Tap / Flap				ɾ 〈r〉			

=== Vowels ===
	Front	Back
Close	i	u
Near-close	ɪ	ʊ
Close-mid	e	o
Open-mid	ɛ	ɔ
Open	a	ɑ

== See also ==
- Kenyan English
- Sheng slang
