= Kiezdeutsch =

Variety of German spoken by youth in multilingual neighborhoods

- Region: Kreuzberg, Berlin, Germany
- Language family: Indo-European: Germanic; West Germanic; Elbe Germanic; High German; Berlin German; Kiezdeutsch

Language codes
- ISO 639-3: –

Kiezdeutsch (German pronunciation: [ˈkiːt͡sˌdɔɪ̯t͡ʃ]) is a variety of German spoken primarily by youth in urban spaces in which a high percentage of the population is multilingual and has an immigration background. Since the 1990s, Kiezdeutsch has come into the public eye as a multiethnic language.

== Definition ==
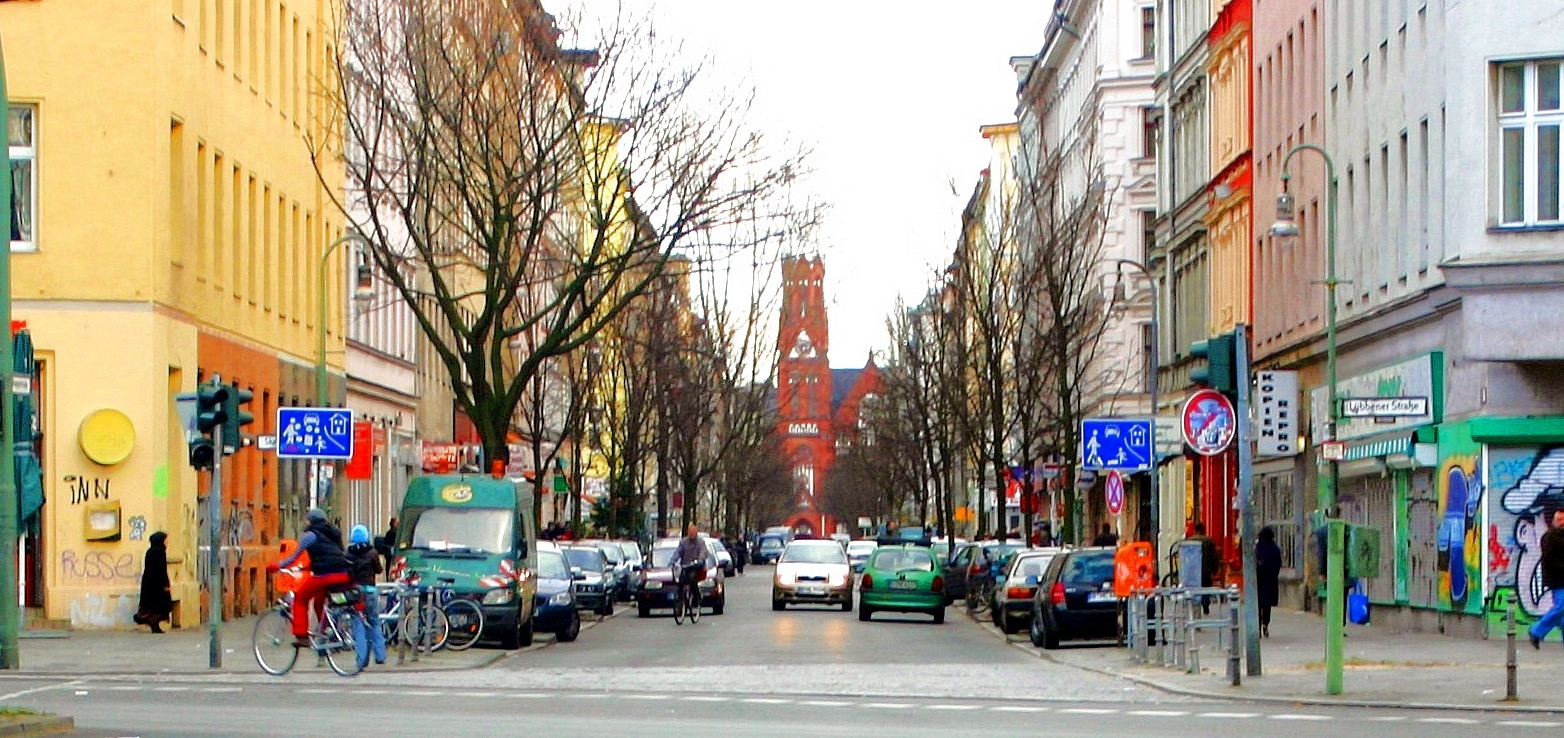
Use of the term originated in the multiethnic Kreuzberg district.

The term "Kiezdeutsch" originated among youth in the Kreuzberg district of Berlin who used it to describe their language use amongst themselves. In 2006, it was used in an essay by linguist Heike Wiese and subsequently became an established term within the academy as well as the public sphere. Previously used terms include "Gemischt-sprechen" (mixed-speaking), "Türkendeutsch" (Turkish German), "Ghettodeutsch" (ghetto German), and "Kanak Sprak" (Kanake language, a reappropriated pejorative).

The term Kiezdeutsch avoided negative connotations and does not limit the language group to a particular ethnicity. Additionally, it makes clear that it is both a variety of German and an informal style of speech used in the "Kiez" (a term which in Berlin German refers to an urban neighborhood).

== Classification ==
Linguist Norbert Dittmar classifies Kiezdeutsch as an ethnolect and claims only spoken ethnolectal use was documented up to 2007. Eva Wittenberg defines Kiezdeutsch more concretely as a multi-ethnolectal German youth language.

Heike Wiese argues that Kiezdeutsch should be considered a "new dialect" due to its use amongst youth of various ethnic groups in urban areas with high proportions of immigrants. This has been critiqued by Germanist Helmut Glück, who argues that a dialect always refers to a historically rooted way of speaking characteristic of a particular region (rather than with a particular ethnic and age groups). He draws comparisons to Ruhrdeutsch, influenced by Polish immigration, and claims Kiezdeutsch is similarly most appropriately labelled a sociolect.

== Grammatic and lexical features ==
Kiezdeutsch deviates in a variety of ways from Standard German and features a number of grammatical and lexical innovations. It is regularly subject to vehement criticism and described by some as broken or error-ridden German. A statement of the German Society for Linguistics disputes these criticisms, however. Linguists argue that like other variants of German, the use of Kiezdeutsch does not indicate poor language competencies. Instead, among its speakers, Kiezdeutsch is a single piece of a large spoken repertoire that also includes formal manners of speaking such as Standard German. The grammatic characteristics detailed below are used particularly in informal peer-group situations and signify affiliation with a particular community.

=== Shortening of nominal phrases ===
One of the most prominent features of Kiezdeutsch is the use of shortened nominal phrases (without articles or prepositions) as place and time markers:

"Gehst du heute auch Viktoriapark?" (Are you also going Victoria Park today?)

"Ich werde zweiter Mai fünfzehn." (I will turn 15 2 May)

In the above examples, the prepositions "zum" (to the) and "am" (on the) have been omitted, but do not impact sentence meaning. Shortened phrases of this nature are often perceived as unsystematic linguistic simplifications. However, a similar phenomenon occurs in standard German in informal spoken contexts (for instance, in the region of Berlin shortened nominal phrases are regularly used to designate public transit stops).

=== Shortening of functional words and inflectional endings ===
Functional words and inflectional endings, particular those that can be inferred, are often shortened or dropped:

"Ich habe eine Blase am Fuß. Tut weh." (I have a blister on my foot. Hurts.)

In the above example, the subject ("it") has been dropped from the second sentence as it is implied.

=== Word order variations ===
In Kiezdeutsch, as in Standard German, verbs can be placed in the second-position in declarative clauses and in the last-position in subordinate clauses. However, unlike Standard German, Kiezdeutsch allows for verbs to also be placed in the first- and third-positions:

"Ich wusste ganz genau, dass er das versteht und darum hab ich das auch gesagt, aber jetzt ich hasse ihn."

In the above example, "jetzt ich hasse ihn" places the verb hasse in the third-position. In Standard German, the verb would occupy the second-position: Jetzt hasse ich ihn.

=== Development of new grammatical particles ===
In Kiezdeutsch, constructions featuring two new grammatical particles can be found: "musstu" and "lassma":

"Musstu Doppelstunde fahren!" (rather than: "Du musst Doppelstunde fahren!")

"Lassma Moritzplatz aussteigen." (rather than: "Lass uns mal Moritzplatz aussteigen.")

Although musstu is based on the second-person phrase "musst du," it can also be used when referring to groups of people. In these instances, Standard German would require the use of "müsst ihr."

=== Use of "so" as an emphasis marker ===
The particle "so" is frequently used as an emphasis marker. While this usage can also be seen outside of Kiezdeutsch, it is much less common in monolingual than multilingual contexts:

"Dicker, ich hab, ich weiß nicht, also die Stadt ist nicht mein Dings so. Weißt, was ich meine? Ich bin mehr so Naturtyp für Natur, Dorf. So im Grünen, das ist mein Ding."

"Ich höre Alpa Gun, weil er so aus Schöneberg kommt." (emphasizing "aus Schöneberg")

"Die hübschesten Frauen kommen von den Schweden, also ich mein, so blond so." (emphasizing "blond")

=== Introduction of foreign words ===
New foreign words are integrated from heritage languages such as Turkish and Arabic, but also American English. These foreign words are used following the rules of German grammar and their pronunciation is Germanized. They are used to the same degree by speakers with varying language backgrounds (for instance, Arabic words used by speakers with no Arabic background).

=== Coronalization of the "ich-Laute" ===
On a phonological level, the coronalization of the voiceless palatal fricative is noteworthy. This is also known to occur in dialects from the Rhineland.

== Linguistic studies ==
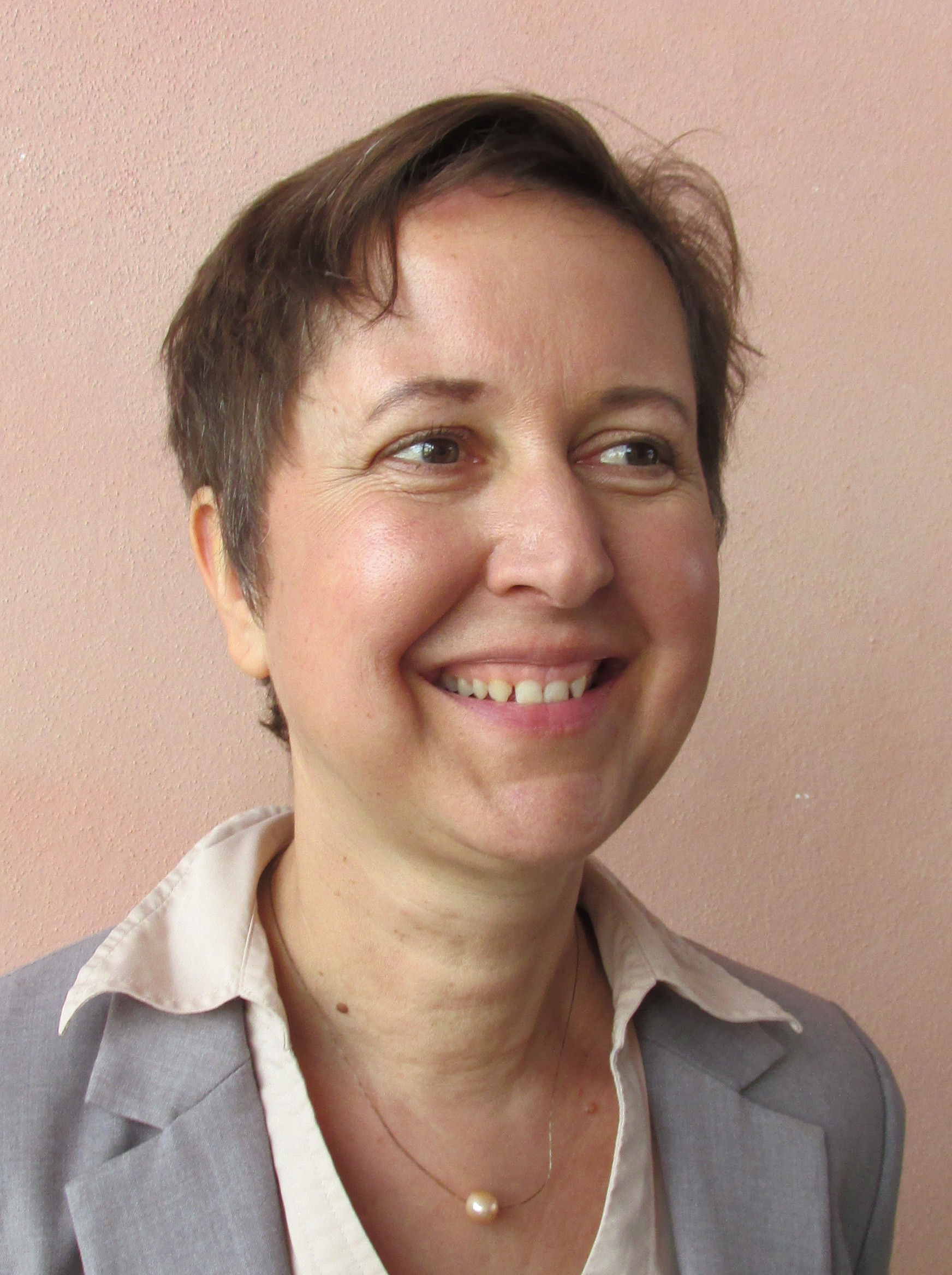
Heike Wiese, who established ''Kiezdeutsch'' as an academic term

There have been numerous linguistic studies of Kiezdeutsch that investigate both sociolinguistics and grammar.

Sociolinguistic themes such as group-specifics, identity construction, and media stylization are addressed in Inken Keim's study of the speaking patterns of a bilingual German-Turkish group of girls in Mannheim, Heike Wiese's essays on the construction of social groups, and the work of Peter Auer, Jannis Androutsopoulos, and Helga Kotthoff on the adoption of Kiezdeutsch amongst monolingual speakers and its medial transformation. Newer studies concern themselves with the speaking repertoire of Kiezdeutsch speakers and related register differences. Additionally, a central focus the sociolinguistic investigation of Kiezdeutsch is an assessment of the linguistic attitudes of both Kiezdeutsch speakers and broader society. In the area of application, there are multiple studies on Kiezdeutsch use in schools, particularly suggestions for integrating it into German language instruction.

In the area of grammar, the majority of research focuses on the phonetics, phonology, and syntax of Kiezdeutsch. Researchers interested in phonetics and phonology include Selting & Kern (2009), Jannedy et al. (2011), Šimšek (2012), Kern (2013), and Jannedy & Weirich (2014). Syntactic studies are often concerned with the third-position placement of verbs in imperative sentences as well as shortened nominal and prepositional phrases. Heike Wiese has is the foremost researcher on the creation of new particles.

== Kiezdeutsch Corpus (KiDKo) ==
A comprehensive collection of conversations in Kiezdeutsch is available via the Kiezdeutsch Corpus (Kiezdeutschkorpus, or KiDKo). The KiDKo was developed between 2008 and 2015 through a project at the University of Potsdam.

The corpus, which is freely accessible and online, is based in part on audio recordings of youth in a multiethnic neighborhood (Berlin-Kreuzberg) amongst their friend circle during their free time. Another section of the corpus is based on youth in a monoethnic neighborhood with comparable socioeconomic conditions (Berlin-Hellersdorf). That allows for comparative study. The recordings were made in 2008 and are available as written transcripts.

The corpus is linguistically annotated. In addition to the literal transcript, it includes an orthographically normalized form (partly consisting of translations from Turkish), part of speech tagging, as well as syntactic information. The transcripts are linked to their audio files. All data is anonymized.
