= Apo koinou construction =

In linguistics, an apo koinou construction (/æpəˈkɔɪnuː/) is a blend of two clauses through a lexical word that has two syntactical functions, one in each of the blended clauses. The clauses are connected asyndetically.

Usually the word common to both sentences is a predicative or an object in the first sentence and a subject in the second one. Such constructions are not grammatical in standard modern English, but may serve stylistic functions, such as conveying dialect in writing. In many cases, the second clause of such a construction may be seen as a relative clause whose relative pronoun has been dropped, which in English is not generally grammatical when the relative pronoun is the subject of its clause.

The term 'apo koinou' is from two Greek words: the preposition apo 'from'; and koinou, the genitive singular of the neuter adjective koinon 'common'.

== Examples ==
- "There was no breeze came through the door". (E. Hemingway)
- "There was a door led into the kitchen". (E. Hemingway)
- "This is the sword killed him." (Routledge Dictionary of Language and Linguistics)
- "There was a farmer had a dog." (Bingo, a children's folk song)
- "There were two campers made a friend." (Theme from Camp Lazlo)

== In languages other than English ==
Although the apo koinou construction is not grammatical in standard English, many other languages permit it, such as Mandarin Chinese.
