= Sheng slang =

Urban dialect spoken in Kenya

Sheng
- Kenyan Pidgin
- Kenyan Creole
- Native to: Kenya
- Native speakers: none L2:1,000,000
- Language family: Swahili–English mix
- Writing system: Latin

Official status
- Regulated by: not regulated

Language codes
- ISO 639-3: –

Sheng is primarily a Swahili and English-based cant, slang, perhaps a mixed language or creole, originating among the urban youth of Nairobi, Kenya, and influenced by many of the languages spoken there. While primarily a language of urban youths, it has spread across social classes and geographically to neighbouring Tanzania and Uganda. It is a language variety spoken as a lingua franca across Kenya. For many years, it has been used on school playgrounds and campuses and in political campaigns, and today it is finding its way into spoken media. Sheng expressions are neither standardised nor taught in formal establishments, but rather appear in daily discourse, usually in informal settings. Kenyan speakers regularly use slang in conversation, depending on their audience and level of familiarity. Sheng unites the different ethnic groups in the country, especially in their trade and social interaction with each other. English and Swahili are Kenya's official languages, and Sheng, despite its common use throughout the country, has no official status.

== Etymology and history ==
The word "Sheng" is coined from the two languages that it is mainly derived from: Swahili and English. The "h" was included from the middle of "Swahili" because "Seng" would have sounded unusual. The term is first recorded in 1965.

Originating in the early 1950s in the Eastlands area of Nairobi (variously described as a "slum", "ghetto" or "suburb"), Sheng is now heard among matatu drivers/touts across the region, and in the popular media. Most of the Sheng words are introduced in various communities and schools and given wide exposure by music artists who include them in their lyrics, hence the rapid growth.

Like all slang, Sheng is mainly used by the youth and is part of popular culture in Kenya. It also evolves rapidly, as words are moved into and out of slang use. It found broad usage among hip-hop artists such as Kalamashaka and G.rongi in the African Great Lakes region in the '90s, both mainstream and "underground" (whose music helped spread the language and contribute to rapid changes or shifts in Sheng vocabulary), as well as among virtually all university and secondary-school students.

Although the grammar, syntax, and much of the vocabulary are drawn from Swahili, Sheng borrows from the languages of some of the largest ethnic groups in Kenya, including Luhya, Gĩkũyũ, Luo and Kamba. Words are also borrowed from languages that are neither a local language nor English – such as the Sheng word morgen "morning" – a Sheng word used in some areas with a similar meaning in German.

Sheng vocabulary can vary significantly within Kenya's various subdivisions and the larger African Great Lakes region, and even between neighbourhoods in Nairobi. Many youth living in the capital often use the argot as their everyday mode of communication rather than Swahili or English.

Many Gen Z and Millennials easily adapt to other variants of Sheng like Shembeteng, Shengilo and Shengtezo.

Shembeteng is a highly encrypted form of Sheng that originated in the suburbs of Eastlands such as Kayole. It was popularized in the early 2020s through music and social media. It involves adding the vowels mbata, mbete, mbiti, mboto and mbutu to already existing words. It's usually only used by youths.

The use of social media platforms like TikTok have contributed to the growth of Sheng.

== Sheng in literature ==
The written use of Sheng in literature is still a minor phenomenon. Some poems in the African literary magazine Kwani? have been published in Sheng, and the first book in this language is "Lafudhi hip hop poetry in Sheng" (2015), written by G.rongi.

== Sample vocabulary ==
Sheng	English (definition)
Mbichi	New
Zang, winch, wira, baroda	Job
Mutina or motina	Africanis dog
Kitu	Beautiful
nyong'inyo	Socks
Bosco	Dog
kinda	sell
rodhi	trouser
dunga	wear
ngasha	shower
kugura	to leave, to vacate premises
denki	go for long call
zabe	makeshift place of business
idha	time
mnati, ras	Rastafarian
babi, barbie	person who doesn't speak Sheng, person from a wealthy background
Ngori, noma	trouble
bonga (bong-gah), Roroa, zoza, banja, tema	talk
bonga mavi	talk smack
kukafunga	get rich
para	family
digaga	spectacle
sepa	go away, flee
setoka	represent
mbwakni	jumpy
peremba	interrogate
dai	want, view
dungia (doong-gi-ah), gawia, chapia, vutia	hit up (call someone)
apantambua	no respect to that (don't recognize that)
riba, zabe	story
serereka	have fun
dishi, dema, dimbua	eat
pack, stick	live (somewhere)
ndeng'a, thwau, bunde, mchuma, mtoo, ridhe, fee, toka	gun, firearm
keroma, demo	food
chapaa, munde, mundez, niado, ganji, doe, keroma, cheddar/chedaz, dau, mkwanja, makwarkwar, cheng	money
so, kioo, exsoo, red, os	one hundred shillings
vioo	hundrends
finje, chuani, pachas, hamusini, nich	fifty shillings
mbao, blue, mbalu	twenty shillings
ashuu, shoe, kindee, ikongo, das, teja	ten shillings
wai, shika	buy
ngovo, kobole, guoko	five shillings
rwabe, doso, jill	two hundred shillings
punch, jirongo	five hundred shillings
thao, jii (like the letter G), kapaa, ngiri, ngwanye, ndovu, azar, K, muti, bramba	one thousand shillings
fala, mwere (mweh-reh), dwanzi, zuzu	stupid person, idiot
ocha, moshatha, shaggz	up country, rural home/area
liet, noma, niku hatata, wa gwan, niku moto	in a mess, trouble
Conte	Tough person
Oposh, momo, fatso, bazu	Fat person
1 GB	Skinny person
njeve	cold
ingiza njeve, gwaya, buya	get scared, be afraid, chicken out
Kanjo	city/town council officer
chapo	chapati
ngodha	underpants
msee, mzing' kizee, mdhii, mguys, mzeiya, mtunguyaz, mzaee, morio	guy, dude
dame, mresh, supuu, msupa, manzi, shore (sho-reh; from "shawty"), msusu, mroro, mshee, totoh, yeng, mdenge, nyang'anya, nyegz, ngus	girl, chick
buda, mzae, arinzu, mzing	father
gweng, gwan	hard (difficult)
zii, nada, do, nah	no
mathree, mat, jive, jav, buu, nganya	matatu
ngwai, Tire (Tea-Reh), kithuke, vela, ndom, aroma, shashi, kenti, mashashola, kindukulu, shada	bhang, marijuana
msudi	traitor, snitch
deree, kigonyi, vandere	driver
konkodi, makanga, manumber, donda	bus/matatu conductor
fegi, mozo, ngale, fuaka	cigarette
mzae	male parent
karao, gova, sanse, beast, afande,	police
keja, hao, mbanyu, base, digs, guba, ndaki	house, home
matha, mathe, mthama, masa, mondhres	woman, mother
mboch, chinebo	housegirl (maid)
mbota, wochi	watch
mbwenya, jako, blazer	coat
dhafu, githafu, madhafu, mao	Mathematics
mdosi, sonko, sos, penki, donga, bombay, bola, Okwonkwo, dela, bazu	Rich person
msoto, mbleina, sufferer, hustler	poor person
sota, kauka, chupri	go bankrupt/become poor
bie, B.A	good
mzing, fathe, mbuyu, buda, arinzu,	dad
masa, mathe, mnyaka, mokoro, moda, mthama, mondhres	mum
oga	an individual from Nigeria
ndauo	an individual with Maasai descent
mngoso	an individual with English descent
Mchinku	an individual with Chinese descent
Gaki	an individual belonging to Kisii community
msapere, mkiuk, okuyu	an individual belonging to Kenya's Kikuyu ethnic community or generally Bantu
Mkao, mcambodia, mnduli	an individual belonging to Kenya's Kamba ethnic community
mjaka, mjaze, mjaksus, mjathe	an individual belonging to Kenya's Luo ethnic community
mgirish	an individual belonging to Kenya's Giriama people ethnic community
mlunje	an individual belonging to Kenya's Luhya ethnic community
mkale	an individual belonging to Kenya's Kalenjin ethnic community
Arges, walalo, oria, msom	an individual belonging to Kenya's Somali ethnic community
Kasee	a male person from the Kamba ethnic community of Kenya
Baite (pronounced vaite)	a male person from the Meru ethnic community of Kenya
Muraa	a male person from the Kuria ethnic community of Kenya
nare (nah-reh)	fire, matches
ndai, moti, murenga, dinga	car
ngata (ng-gah-tah), ngede (ng-geh-deh), irori	fuel
nguenos, ngwex, mwewe, ngwetes, ngokos	chicken
rodhi	trouser
njumu, njuti, ndula, magwanda, manduleng', chuja, kladi	shoes
poa, wazi, wabe, fiti, chonjo	cool
ubao, maunenge, kidale	hunger
mboka	city
uaganis	nonsense
veve, mbachu, shamba, mogoka, jaba	miraa
kuber (koo-beh-r), kubz, doze, mungich, mungiki	(chewing) tobacco
mburungo	cargo
chapa, donje, kiatu, forbes, kiraka, kubeat	ugly
fyat, chizi	crazy
Teo	Exams
chipo, chibaz, njiva, vanga	chips
fika, ishia, jikata, sepa	to go somewhere
kirende, mbogi	crowd
earthwire	neck tie
nyonde	bird
chuom	pathway/shortcut
dush	dove/pigeon
mavi, mafi, shonde, shoi, shoste	faeces
shower	bath
mode (moh-day), odijo	teacher
mboka	job
omoka, kukafunga,	be rich
mzii/noma	tough/bad
majuu, mayolo, chambele, farova	Western world/overseas
mlami, myuro	white person, Caucasian person
mtiaji, msororaji, mrazi	a cunning person, tattletale
kauzi, thegi, gondi, dingo, obe (ob), gwangi	thief, thug, mugger, burglar
masaa, githaa	time
mshikaji, bf, gf	boyfriend/girlfriend
pasuka, raruka	laugh
karokota, doze, kufinyilia, kutuna, dwatha	take a nap, sleep
nyaku, waka, washa, gwezere, malaga,	drink (alcohol)
kalesa, pace, tembeza	walk a distance
tei, maji	alcohol
tenje, mtambo	Radio/ music system or a phone
Nangos, digitz	Number
N.B. Words in brackets in the Sheng column show how the word is pronounced.

=== Examples ===
Sheng	Standard Kiswahili (translation)	Standard English (translation)
Umekemba gazo, radar ni fom zimekalas hadi msoto imeramba mayenx viudu.	Imechapishwa magazetini ya kwamba ukosefu Wa kazi imeathiri vijana kiafya ya akili	The newspapers assert that being unemployed has affected the mental health of the youth.
Shosh yake alimtobokea vioo nei za guba	Nyanya yake alimpa mia nne alipie kodi ya nyumba	Her mother gave her four hundred dollars to pay the rent.
Uyo Arif ako na za ovyo	Huyo rafiki yako anapenda mzaha.	Your friend likes jokes!
Sepa hii daro juu odijo akimuok, kutatee!	Toka humu darasani maana mwalimu akija atakuadhibu!.	Leave this classroom, because when the teacher comes you'll be punished!
Gura hiyo chuom, madingo watakuchai.!	Koma kupita hiyo njia wezi wapo hapo, watakuibia	Avoid that path – it's laden with thugs who'll steal from you!
Tangu Kama akanjwe anajiskia skari, sana!	Kama alipo pata pesa, alianza kuringa	After receiving some money, Kama became boastful.
Amulia hata dhenga ya nich nijipin, niko kidale, mzing!	Ninunulie githeri ya hamsini tafadhali nile nina njaa	Could you give me fifty shillings to buy a meal? (a specific meal of boiled maize and beans is mentioned but the actual meaning is the price of what is considered the cheapest item in a food kiosk)
Huu msee ni fala!	Huyu mtu ni mjinga.	This guy's an idiot!
Si unidungie chuani?	Unaeza nipa shilingi hamsini?	Can you please give me fifty shillings?
Acha kubonga mavi mdhii.	Acha kuongea vibaya, kaka.	Stop talking bad things, brother.
Udingo ndio maana magidha ako ndani, riba ni alichai Doo ya gova	Ufisadi ndio chanzo ya kushtakiwa kwake, mda wote yupo kizimbani Kwa mashtaka ya wizi wa pesa za serikali	Corruption is the main reason he is in and out of the courts for allegations of embezzlement of government's money"
Ukivuta fegi utajiletea noma.	Ukivuta sigara utajiletea shida.	If you smoke cigarettes you'll get yourself into trouble.
Ule dame amechapa!	Yule msichana ana sura mbaya.	That girl is ugly.
Maisha ni gwan bana.	Maisha ni ngumu kaka.	Life is hard man.
Kuja utugawie hizi njiva.	Kuja utugawie hivi vibanzi.	Come and share your chips with us.
Budake alishikwa na makarao.	Babake alikamatwa na polisi.	His dad was caught by the police.
Aliibiwa mbota na mboch.	Aliibiwa saa na mjakazi.	His watch was stolen by his servant girl.
Aliona magondi akaingiza njeve.	Aliona mhuni akahisi woga.	He got scared when he saw some robbers.
Niko mbioni.	Niko na haraka.	I am in a hurry.
Budake ni mzii.	Babake ni mkali.	His father is tough/bad.
Walibambwa Na masanse, wakikwaria gova kuchocha.	Walitiwa kizimbani baada ya kulalamikia bei ya vitu kupanda.	They were arrested after protesting about the rising cost of basic commodities.
Mokoro aliniwai rwabe nikamchekie ka kwota.	Mamangu alinipa shilingi mia mbili nikamnunulie kilo kuota ya nyama.	My mother gave me 200 shillings to go buy a quarter kilogram of meat.
Alirauka ngware ndo asihate mat za kwenda kwao moshatha.	Aliamka mapema ili asikose matatu ya kuenda kwao kijijini.	He woke up early so as not to miss a minibus to his rural home.

== See also ==
- Engsh
- Kenyan English

== Additional literature ==
- Abdulaziz, Mohamed H. and Ken Osinde. 1997. Sheng and Engsh: development of mixed codes among the urban youth in Kenya. International Journal of the Sociology of Language 125 (Sociolinguistic Issues in Sub-Saharan Africa), pp. 45–63.
- Barasa, Sandra Nekesa, and Maarten Mous. "Engsh, a Kenyan middle class youth language parallel to Sheng." Journal of Pidgin and Creole Languages 32, no. 1 (2017): 48-74.
- Beck, Rose Marie. 2015. "Sheng: an urban variety of Swahili in Kenya." Youth Language Practices in Africa and Beyond, Nico Nassenstein and Andrea Hollington, (eds.) 51–79. Berlin: de Gruyter.
- Bosire, Mokaya. 2009. What makes a Sheng word unique? Lexical manipulation in mixed languages. In AkinloyeOjo & Lioba Moshi (Eds), Selected Proceedings of the 39th Annual Conference on African Linguistics, 77–85.
- Bosire, Mokaya. 2006. Hybrid languages: The case of Sheng. In Olaoba F. Arasanyin & Michael A.Pemberton (Eds). Selected Proceedings of the 36th Annual Conference on African Linguistics, 185–193.
- Erastus, Fridah Kanana, and Ellen Hurst–Harosh. Rural and urban metaphors in Sheng (Kenya) and Tsotsitaal (South Africa). Göttingen: Cuvillier, 2019.
- Fee, D., & Moga, J. 1997. Sheng dictionary.Third edition. Nairobi: Ginseng Publishers.
- Fink, Teresa Kathleen. 2005. Attitudes toward languages in Nairobi. Diss. University of Pittsburgh.
- Githinji, Peter. 2005. Sheng and variation: The construction and negotiation of layered identities. PhD dissertation, Michigan State University.
- Githinji, Peter. 2006. Bazes and Their Shibboleths: Lexical Variation and Sheng Speakers' Identity in Nairobi. Nordic Journal of African Studies 15(4): 443–472.
- Githiora, Chege. 2002. Sheng: peer language, Swahili dialect or emerging Creole? Journal of African Cultural Studies Volume 15, Number 2, pp. 159–181.
- Githiora, Chege J. Sheng: rise of a Kenyan Swahili vernacular. Boydell & Brewer, 2018.
- Kanana Erastus, Fridah, and Hilda Kebeya. "Functions of urban and youth language in the new media: The case of Sheng in Kenya." African youth languages: New media, performing arts and sociolinguistic development (2018): 15-52.
- Kang’ethe-Iraki, Frederick. 2004. Cognitive Efficiency: The Sheng phenomenon in Kenya. Pragmatics 14(1): 55–68.
- Kariuki, Annah, Fridah Erastus Kanana, and Hildah Kebeya. "The growth and use of Sheng in advertisements in selected businesses in Kenya." Journal of African Cultural Studies 27, no. 2 (2015): 229-246.
- Kaviti, Lillian. "From Stigma to Status-Sheng and Engsh in Kenya's Linguistic and Literary Space." Matatu 46 (2015): 223ff.
- Kießling, Roland & Maarten Mous. 2004. Urban Youth Languages in Africa. Anthropological Linguistics 46(3): 303-341
- King'ei, Kitula, and John Kobia. "Lugha Kama Kitambulisho: Changamoto ya Sheng Nchini Kenya." Nordic Journal of African Studies 16, no. 3 (2007).
- Kioko, Eric. "Regional varieties and ‘ethnic’registers of Sheng." Youth language practices in Africa and beyond (2015): 119-148.
- Mazrui, Alamin. 1995. Slang and Codeswitching: The case of Sheng in Kenya. Afrikanistische Arbeitspapiere 42: 168–179.
- Ogechi, Nathan Oyori. 2002. Trilingual Codeswitching in Kenya – Evidence from Ekegusii, Kiswahili, English and Sheng. Doctoral dissertation, Universität Hamburg.
- Momanyi, Clara. "The Effects of'Sheng'in the Teaching of Kiswahili in Kenyan Schools." Journal of Pan African Studies (2009).
- Mous, Maarten, and Sandra Barasa. "Kenya: Sheng and Engsh." In Urban Contact Dialects and Language Change, pp. 105–124. Routledge, 2022.
- Mutiga, Jayne. "Effects of language spread on a people’phenomenology: The case of Sheng’in Kenya." Journal of Language, Technology & Entrepreneurship in Africa 4, no. 1 (2013): 1-15.
- Ogechi, Nathan. 2005. On Lexicalization in Sheng. Nordic Journal of African Studies 14(3): 334–355.
- Samper, David. 2002. Talking Sheng: The role of a Hybrid Language in the Construction of Identity and Youth Culture in Nairobi Kenya. PhD Dissertation, University of Pennsylvania.
- Spyropoulos, Mary. 1987. Sheng: some preliminary investigations into a recently emerged Nairobi street language. Journal of the Anthropological Society 18 (1): 125–136.
- Vierke, Clarissa. 2015. "Some remarks on poetic aspects of Sheng." Global Repertoires and Urban Fluidity. Youth Languages in Africa, Nico Nassenstein and Andrea Hollington, (eds.) 227–256. Berlin: de Gruyter.
