= Helmut Glück =

- Born: July 23, 1949 (age 76); Stuttgart, Germany
- Occupation: Linguist

Helmut Glück (born 23 July 1949, Stuttgart) is a German linguist.

== Life ==
Helmut Glück studied German studies, Scandinavian studies, and Slavic studies in Tübingen and Bochum, working at the universities of Osnabrück, Hannover, Oldenburg, Siegen, and Cairo. From 1991 to 2015, he was professor of German Linguistics and German as a Foreign Language at the University of Bamberg.

Glück's studies are principally concerned with the German language as a foreign language, its history, and its politics (e.g. discussion of German linguistic science). He edits the Metzler Lexikon Sprache, now in its sixth edition, 700 of whose articles are also by him.

He was the speaker of the jury for the Kulturpreis Deutsche Sprache, an annual award supporting the creative development of the German language.

== Works ==
=== Monographs ===
- Die Fremdsprache Deutsch im Zeitalter der Aufklärung, der Klassik und der Romantik. Grundzüge der deutschen Sprachgeschichte in Europa. Harrassowitz, Wiesbaden 2013, ISBN 978-3-447-10033-5.
- with Yvonne Pörzgen: Deutschlernen in Russland und in den baltischen Ländern vom 17. Jahrhundert bis 1941. Harrassowitz, Wiesbaden 2009, ISBN 978-3-447-05842-1.
- with Ineta Polanska: Johann Ernst Glück (1654–1705): Pastor, Philologe, Volksaufklärer im Baltikum und in Russland. (= Fremdsprachen in Geschichte und Gegenwart. Bd. 1). Harrassowitz, Wiesbaden 2005, ISBN 3-447-05173-6.
- Deutsch als Fremdsprache in Europa vom Mittelalter bis zur Barockzeit. de Gruyter, Berlin 2002, ISBN 3-11-017084-1.
- Schrift und Schriftlichkeit. Eine sprach- und kulturwissenschaftliche Studie. Metzler, Stuttgart 1987, ISBN 3-476-00608-5. (Zugleich: Habilitations-Schrift. Universität Hannover, 1984)
- with Wolfgang Werner Sauer: Gegenwartsdeutsch. (= Sammlung Metzler 252). Metzler, Stuttgart u. a. 1990, ISBN 3-476-10252-1. (2., überarbeitete und erweiterte Auflage. ebenda 1997, ISBN 3-476-12252-2).

=== As editor ===
- Fremdsprachen in Geschichte und Gegenwart. Bd. 1–lfd., 2005–lfd., ISSN 1860-5842.
- Die Geschichte des Deutschen als Fremdsprache. Bd. 1–lfd., 2002–lfd., ISSN 1610-4226.
- Metzler-Lexikon Sprache. Metzler, Stuttgart u. a. 1993, ISBN 3-476-00937-8 (4., aktualisierte und überarbeitete Auflage. ebenda 2010, ISBN 978-3-476-02335-3; 5. Aufl. mit Michael Rödel als Mitherausgeber, 2016, ISBN 978-3-476-02641-5).
