= Bisnorhopane =

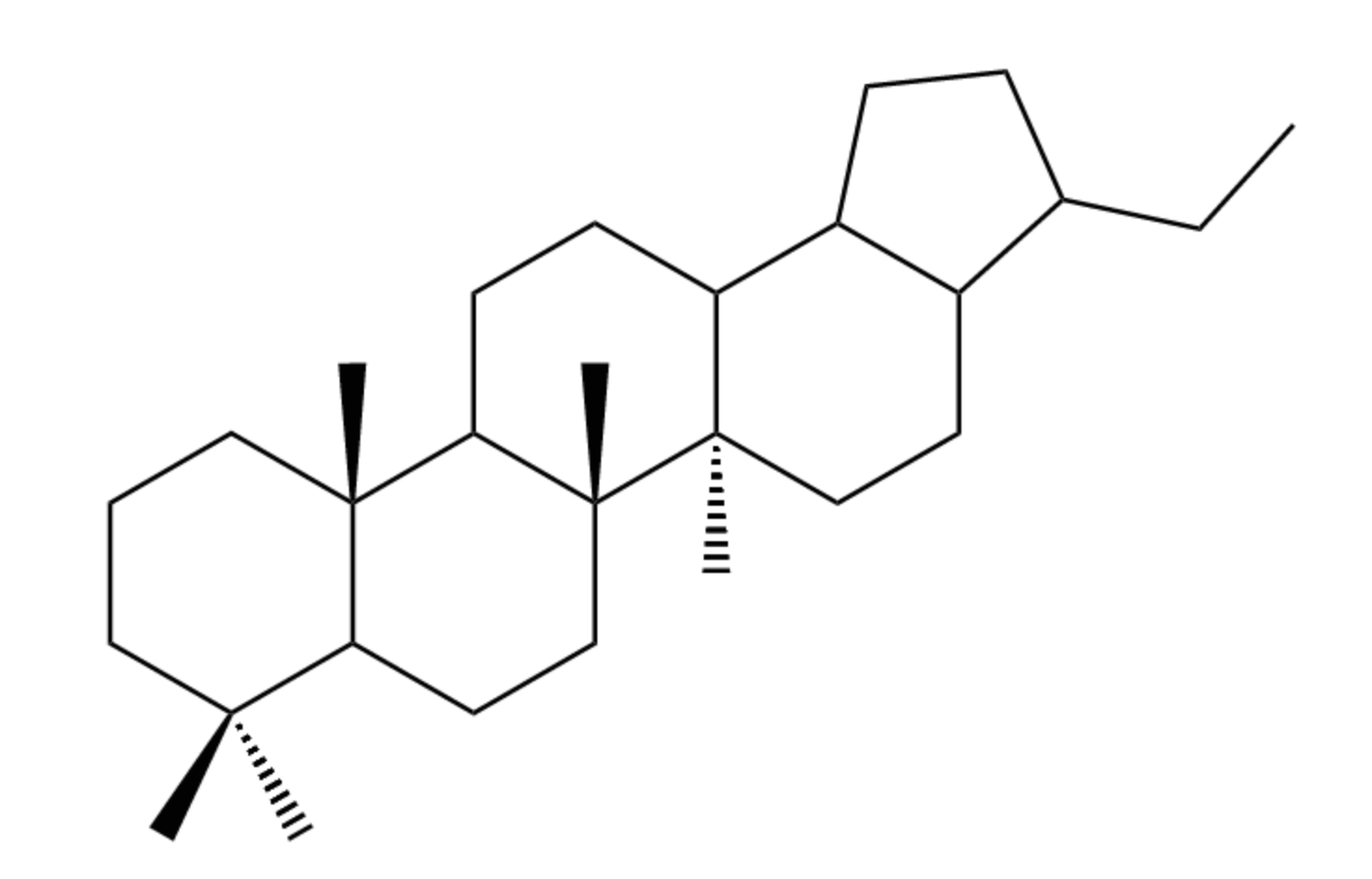
- 28,30-Bisnorhopane

Names
- IUPAC name 3-ethyl-5a,5b,8,8,11a-pentamethyl-2,3,3a,4,5,6,7,7a,9,10,11,11b,12,13,13a,13b-hexadecahydro-1H-cyclopenta[a]chrysene

Identifiers
CAS Number	65636-26-2
3D model (JSmol)	Interactive image
ChemSpider	43390
PubChem CID	47689
- InChI: InChI=1S/C28H48/c1-7-19-9-10-21-20(19)13-17-27(5)22(21)11-12-24-26(4)16-8-15-25(2,3)23(26)14-18-28(24,27)6/h19-24H,7-18H2,1-6H3 Key: RLPRHPNFVLCDPC-UHFFFAOYSA-N
- SMILES: CCC1CCC2C1CCC3(C2CCC4C3(CCC5C4(CCCC5(C)C)C)C)C

Properties
Chemical formula	C_{28}H_{48}
Molar mass	384.692 g·mol^{−1}
- Except where otherwise noted, data are given for materials in their standard state (at 25 °C [77 °F], 100 kPa). Infobox references

Bisnorhopanes (BNH) are a group of demethylated hopanes found in oil shales across the globe and can be used for understanding depositional conditions of the source rock. The most common member, 28,30-bisnorhopane, can be found in high concentrations in petroleum source rocks, most notably the Monterey Shale, as well as in oil and tar samples. 28,30-Bisnorhopane was first identified in samples from the Monterey Shale Formation in 1985. It occurs in abundance throughout the formation and appears in stratigraphically analogous locations along the California coast. Since its identification and analysis, 28,30-bisnorhopane has been discovered in oil shales around the globe, including lacustrine and offshore deposits of Brazil, silicified shales of the Eocene in Gabon, the Kimmeridge Clay Formation in the North Sea, and in Western Australian oil shales.

== Chemistry ==
28,30-bisnorhopane exists in three epimers: 17α,18α21β(H), 17β,18α,21α(H), and 17β,18α,21β(H). During GC-MS, the three epimers coelute at the same time and are nearly indistinguishable. However, mass spectral fragmentation of the 28,30-bisnorhopane is predominantly characterized by m/z 191, 177, and 163. The ratios of 163/191 fragments can be used to distinguish the epimers, where the βαβ orientation has the highest, m/z 163/191 ratio. Further, the D/E ring ratios can be used to create a hierarchy of epimer maturity. From this, it is believed that the ααβ epimer is the first-formed, diagenetically, supported also by its percent dominance in younger shales. 28,30-bisnorhopane is created independently from kerogen, instead derived from bitumen, unbound as free oil-hydrocarbons. As such, as oil generation increases with source maturation, the concentration of 28,30-bisnorhopane decreases. Bisnorhopane may not be a reliable diagnostic for oil maturity due to microbial biodegradation.

=== Nomenclature ===
Norhopanes are a family of demethylated hopanes, identical to the methylated hopane structure, minus indicated desmethylated carbons. 28,30-bisnorhopane, the more common bisnorhopane biomarker, indicates the absence of methyl groups from C28 and C30, while 25,28,30-trisnorhopane, a related compound often found in concurrence with 28,30-bisnorhopane, indicates three demethylated zones across C25, C28, and C30.

== Formation ==
The exact origins of 28,30-bisnorhopane have not been conclusively established, however, there are analytical implications towards generation from chemoautotrophic bacteria. GC-MS and other analyses of source rocks, shales containing bisnorhopane, also provide data on pristane and phytane abundances. 28,30-Bisnorhopane occurs in shales with very low pristane to phytane ratios, which is indicative of generation under anoxic conditions. These shales often also contain appreciable levels of sulfur, which has been presented as possible evidence for sulfide-oxidizing bacterial activity. Fossilized bacterial mats found in the Monterey Formation further influence this argument. It has been proposed that the generation mechanism may be a biodegradation through bacterial demethylation of hopanes, however the specific organism(s) and mechanism(s) are still unknown. Diatoms are sometimes mentioned also as the primary source for bisnorhopane generation.
