= C20H42 =

The molecular formula C_{20}H_{42} may refer to:

- Crocetane, or 2,6,11,15-tetramethylhexadecane, a diterpenoid alkane
- Icosane, an alkane hydrocarbon
- Phytane, a diterpenoid alkane
