= Crocetin glucosyltransferase =

Class of enzymes

Identifiers
- EC no.: 2.4.1.271

Databases
- IntEnz: IntEnz view
- BRENDA: BRENDA entry
- ExPASy: NiceZyme view
- KEGG: KEGG entry
- MetaCyc: metabolic pathway
- PRIAM: profile
- PDB structures: RCSB PDB PDBe PDBsum
Search
- PMC: articles
- PubMed: articles
- NCBI: proteins

Crocetin glucosyltransferase (EC 2.4.1.271, crocetin GTase, UGTCs2) is an enzyme with systematic name UDP-glucose:crocetin 8-O-D-glucosyltransferase. This enzyme catalyses the following chemical reaction

(1) UDP-glucose + crocetin $\rightleftharpoons$ UDP + beta-D-glucosyl crocetin
(2) UDP-glucose + beta-D-glucosyl crocetin $\rightleftharpoons$ UDP + bis(beta-D-glucosyl) crocetin
(3) UDP-glucose + beta-D-gentiobiosyl crocetin $\rightleftharpoons$ UDP + beta-D-gentiobiosyl beta-D-glucosyl crocetin

In Crocus sativus this enzyme esterifies a free carboxyl group of crocetin or crocetin glycosyl ester.
