= Diffusion Pharmaceuticals =

American drug development company

Diffusion Pharmaceuticals Inc (NASDAQ: DFFN)
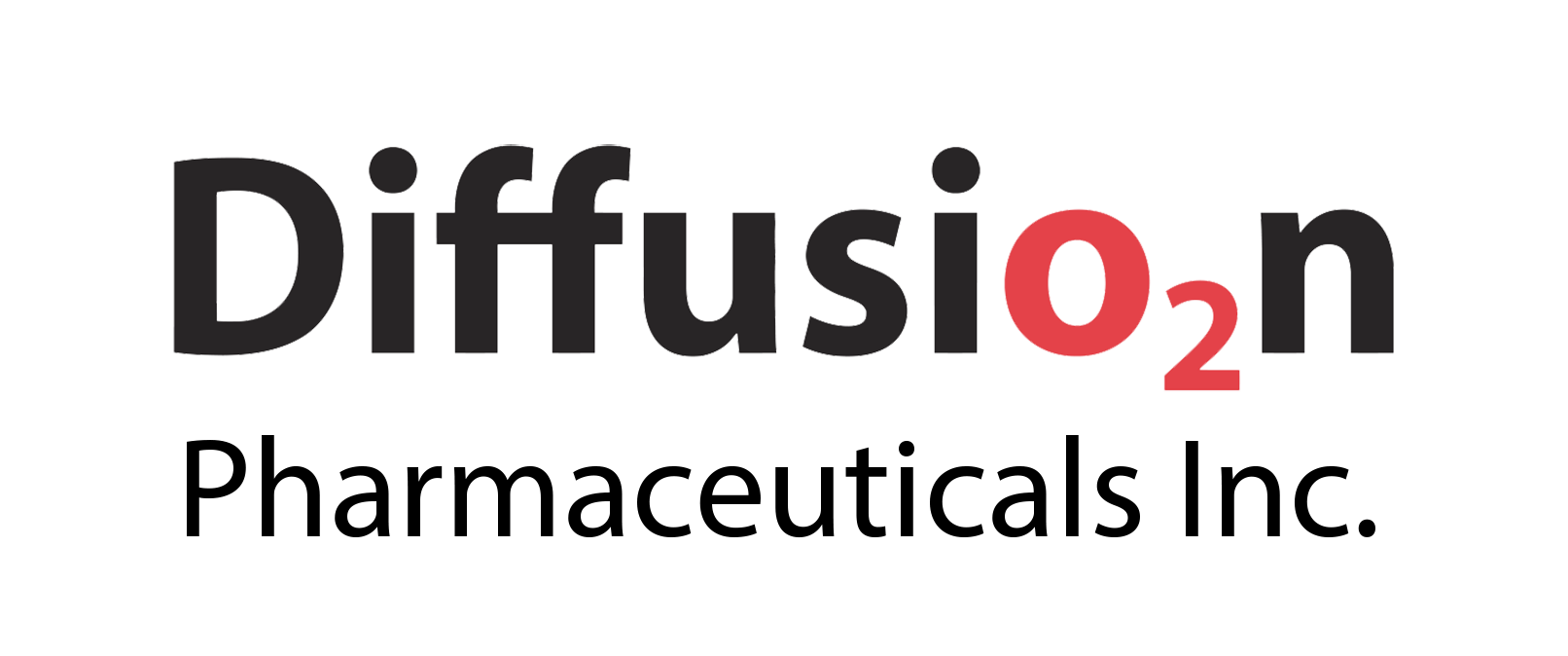
- Company type: Public
- Industry: Biotechnology
- Founded: 2001
- Founders: David Kalergis; John L. Gainer
- Headquarters: Charlottesville, Virginia, U.S.
- Key people: Robert Cobuzzi, Jr (President and CEO); Jane H. Hollingsworth (Chairman of the Board); Christopher D. Galloway (Chief medical officer)
- Products: Trans sodium crocetinate.
- Website: diffusionpharma.com

Diffusion Pharmaceuticals Inc (NASDAQ:DFFN) is a publicly traded biotechnology and drug development company based in Charlottesville, Virginia, U.S. It was co-founded in 2001 by American life sciences entrepreneur David Kalergis and University of Virginia Chemical Engineering Professor John L. Gainer. Gainer is the inventor of the company's platform technology of oxygen diffusion-enhancing compounds and its lead drug, trans sodium crocetinate (TSC). TSC acts to increase the rate at which oxygen moves through blood plasma by the process of diffusion, a phenomenon that forms the basis for the company's name. On January 8, 2016, the formerly privately held company merged with Restorgenex Corporation to become a publicly traded NASDAQ-listed company with the trading symbol DFFN. TSC and other oxygen diffusion-enhancing compounds, including bipolar trans carotenoid salts (the subclass to which TSC belongs), have been investigated by Diffusion Pharmaceuticals for treatment of conditions associated with reduced oxygen availability in tissues (hypoxia). Most recently, Diffusion has begun the initiation of clinical trials in the U.S. and Eastern Europe for the use of trans sodium crocetinate in the treatment of COVID-19 patients with respiratory distress-related oxygen deficiency and the risk of multiple organ failure.

== Research activities ==
Gainer invented the concept of oxygen diffusion-enhancing compounds and its specific embodiment, TSC, while a Professor of Chemical Engineering at the University of Virginia. He secured the first patent on the molecule and its uses in 2000. Before TSC's invention, he and colleagues conducted research on the effects of oxygen diffusion-enhancing compounds in various animal disease models, including atherosclerosis, arthritis and cancer. At that time, crocetin, a naturally occurring carotenoid compound, was the focus of their research. With the invention of TSC, their research turned to the potential use of this synthetic oxygen diffusion-enhancing compound for the improved treatment of hemorrhagic shock (shock caused by the loss of a large volume of blood) on the battlefield. This research, which was supported financially by the United States Office of Naval Research (ONR), was conducted in Gainer's University of Virginia laboratory. Following the company's formation by Kalergis and Gainer in 2001, both ONR and private funding was obtained, enabling company researchers to set up their own laboratory and, along with collaborators, perform further preclinical studies into uses of TSC in the treatment of hemorrhagic shock and other hypoxic conditions, such as ischemic stroke, central nervous system (CNS) disorders, and cancer.

== Clinical trials ==
In 2007, TSC was advanced into clinical trials in humans. Clinical investigation first centered on the drug's safety and pharmacokinetic (PK) parameters in normal healthy volunteers. This was followed in 2009-2010 by a multi-center, randomized, placebo-controlled clinical trial examining TSC's safety and efficacy in the re-oxygenation of tissues in patients affected by peripheral artery disease. The company is currently investigating the use of trans sodium crocetinate in the treatment of COVID-19, acute stroke, and solid cancerous tumors.

== Intellectual property ==
Between 2008 and 2017, Diffusion Pharmaceuticals expanded its intellectual property portfolio, having been awarded new patents (in the United States and internationally) that covered the synthesis and uses of bipolar trans carotenoid salts and related compounds in peripheral artery disease, cancer and other indications. In 2011, TSC received an orphan drug designation from the United States Food and Drug Administration for the use of TSC as a radiosensitizer in the treatment of newly diagnosed GBM patients. In accordance with standard practice, the Orphan Drug designation for TSC confers benefits including enhanced patent protection and marketing rights, waiver of certain FDA filing fees and favorable tax treatment. By mid-2017, the company had been issued 14 U.S. and 46 international patents.

== Awards ==
In 2012, Diffusion Pharmaceuticals won the Virginia Healthcare Innovators award in the “Medical Product or Device ” category for its development of TSC.
