= Zeaxanthin 7,8-dioxygenase =

Identifiers
- EC no.: 1.14.99.42

Databases
- IntEnz: IntEnz view
- BRENDA: BRENDA entry
- ExPASy: NiceZyme view
- KEGG: KEGG entry
- MetaCyc: metabolic pathway
- PRIAM: profile
- PDB structures: RCSB PDB PDBe PDBsum
Search
- PMC: articles
- PubMed: articles
- NCBI: proteins

Zeaxanthin 7,8-dioxygenase (EC 1.14.99.42, zeaxanthin 7,8(7',8')-cleavage dioxygenase, CsZCD) is an enzyme with systematic name zeaxanthin:oxygen oxidoreductase (7,8-cleaving). This enzyme catalyses the following chemical reaction:

zeaxanthin + 2 O_{2} $\rightleftharpoons$ crocetin dialdehyde + 2 (3S)-3-hydroxycyclocitral

This enzyme was initially identified in Crocus sativus (saffron), where it was thought to be the key enzyme in the biosynthesis of crocetin, the compound responsible for the characteristic color of saffron spice. It is a member of the carotenoid cleavage dioxygenase (CCD) family of enzymes.

== Function and significance ==
Zeaxanthin 7,8-dioxygenase is a chromoplastic enzyme that catalyzes the oxidative cleavage of zeaxanthin at the 7,8 and 7',8' double bonds. This reaction produces crocetin dialdehyde and 3-hydroxy-β-cyclocitral. Crocetin dialdehyde is a precursor to crocetin and its glycosylated forms, crocins, which are the main pigments in saffron. The other product, 3-hydroxy-β-cyclocitral, is a volatile compound that contributes to the aroma of saffron.

More recent research has suggested that another enzyme, carotenoid cleavage dioxygenase 2 (CCD2), is the primary enzyme responsible for crocetin biosynthesis in saffron, rather than the originally described zeaxanthin 7,8-dioxygenase (often referred to as ZCD or CsZCD). This has led to some debate in the scientific literature regarding the precise role and classification of zeaxanthin 7,8-dioxygenase.

The reaction catalyzed by this class of enzymes is of significant commercial interest due to the high value of saffron as a spice and natural food colorant.
