= John L. Gainer =

American chemical engineer (1938–2025)

John Lloyd Gainer (July 19, 1938 – July 28, 2025) was an American chemical engineer and co-founder and chief scientific officer of Diffusion Pharmaceuticals, a biotechnology and pharmaceutical company based in Charlottesville, Virginia, U.S. Professor Gainer retired from his position as Chief Science Officer of Diffusion Pharmaceuticals in March 2020. Gainer pioneered investigation into the mechanism of action underlying oxygen diffusion-enhancing compounds (ODECs) and invented the subclass of ODECs known as bipolar trans carotenoid salts. The lead compound of this class is trans sodium crocetinate (TSC) which Gainer invented while a professor of chemical engineering at the University of Virginia.

== Life and career ==
Gainer was born in Grafton, West Virginia on July 19, 1938, to Vincent and Dora Gainer, both teachers. Growing up in Tunnelton, he graduated from Tunnelton High School, part of the Preston County Schools district, in 1956. He earned a BS in chemical engineering from West Virginia University in 1960, and a PhD in chemical engineering in 1964 from the University of Delaware. He later accepted a professorship in the School of Engineering and Applied Science at the University of Virginia. In the early 1970s, he studied the prediction of diffusion rates of gases in liquids and began to investigate oxygen diffusion in biological systems, focusing particularly on the cardiovascular disease atherosclerosis.

While at the University of Virginia, Gainer invented TSC by modifying certain natural products, including saffron, resulting in the creation of a novel single trans isomer carotenoid salt. Using animal models, he then investigated the activity of TSC, exploring his theory that the drug would increase the transfer of oxygen through blood plasma into hypoxic tissues. The drug's clinical promise became evident when Gainer and colleagues demonstrated that TSC could improve survival in animal models of severe hemorrhage while reversing the drop in blood pressure that accompanies the loss of large amounts of blood. From his work with animal models, Gainer also predicted that TSC held promise for the treatment of cancer, stroke, myocardial infarction (heart attack), and other diseases associated with hypoxia and ischemia (a lack of oxygen delivery to tissues). He was awarded the first of over a dozen patents on ODECs and TSC in 2000.

Gainer married Susan Smith from Indiana, Pennsylvania, in 1981; the couple had two sons. He died in Charlottesville on July 28, 2025, at the age of 87.

== Awards and honors ==
Gainer became professor emeritus in chemical engineering at the University of Virginia in 2005. He has been a member of the International Society on Oxygen Transport to Tissue since 1973, the year that the society was formed. He received the University of Virginia Alumni Association's Distinguished Professor Award and the Outstanding Teacher Award from the Southeastern Section of the American Society for Engineering Education. The Virginia Healthcare Innovators "Medical Product or Device" award went to Gainer and Diffusion Pharmaceuticals in 2012, honoring his and the company's work on TSC.
