= David Kalergis =

Life sciences entrepreneur (born 1948)

David Kalergis (born December 9, 1948) is an American life sciences entrepreneur and author. He co-founded and chaired Atelerix Life Sciences Inc., a Charlottesville, Virginia, U.S.-based biotechnology and pharmaceutical company developing novel treatments for the reversal of opioid induced respiratory depression. He co-founded the company in 2020 with Stephen Lewis, James Bates, and Ben Gaston. He retired from this position in 2023.

Previously, he co-founded Diffusion Pharmaceuticals in 2001 with American chemical engineer John L. Gainer. Kalergis became Diffusion's CEO in 2004, retaining that position until 2020, when he left to create Atelerix Life Sciences. During this time, he drew extensively on his career in law, business, and clinical trials implementation to advance the company to Phase 3 clinical trials status and into a NASDAQ publicly traded entity. Under Kalergis' leadership, Diffusion Pharmaceuticals has been cited for advancing improved cancer treatments, conducting multicenter clinical trials of a novel therapeutic for brain cancers, including glioblastoma multiforme. Diffusion Pharmaceuticals has also conducted clinical trials for the treatment of oxygen deficiencies associated with COVID-19 and acute stroke.

== Education and career ==
Kalergis received a B.A. degree in psychology in 1970 and J.D. and M.B.A. Degrees in 1982 from the University of Virginia. He subsequently worked with the New York-based law firm Dewey, Ballantine, Bushby, Palmer & Wood, maintaining that association until 1986, when he became president and General Counsel of Designs Import/Export, Ltd. From 1991 to 1997, he was Consultant, Director of Business Development, and General Counsel to the contract research organization Pharmaceutical Research Associates (PRA), Inc. While with PRA, he was involved in numerous pharmaceutical development projects through the pre-clinical, clinical, and post-marketing stages.

In 1998 Kalergis was appointed Director of University of Virginia Gateway, a program to establish stronger ties between industry and academia, particularly in the area of life sciences. His efforts have been cited in advancing relationships between the high-technology business and academic sectors, both regionally and internationally. It was through his association with the University of Virginia that Kalergis met Gainer, who was at that time a professor of Chemical Engineering, leading to their collaboration in the founding of Diffusion Pharmaceuticals.

Kalergis also attended the Harvard Business School's Leadership and Strategy in Biotechnology and Pharmaceuticals program.

== Other activities ==
Kalergis was a founding director of publicly traded Virginia National Bank where he was Chairman of the Assets and Liabilities Committee and a member of the Audit Committee. He is a former member of the Boards of Directors of the Virginia Biotechnology Association, the Virginia Piedmont Technology Council, and the Computers4Kids Program in Charlottesville, Virginia. He is a former member of the New York and Virginia State Bar Associations.

== Awards and books ==
Kalergis received the Virginia Piedmont Technology Council's Navigator award in 2002. His and Gainer's work at Diffusion Pharmaceuticals was acknowledged in 2012, when the company received the Virginia Healthcare Innovators "Medical Product or Device" award.

Kalergis is the author of The Role of the University in the Commercialization of Biotechnology (1981), and the novel It's Not About Sex, published in 2014 by Atelerix Press.

== Personal ==
Kalergis lives in Charlottesville, Virginia, with his wife, documentary photographer Mary Kalergis.
