= Dactylispa aspersa =

Scientific classification
- Kingdom: Animalia
- Phylum: Arthropoda
- Clade: Pancrustacea
- Class: Insecta
- Order: Coleoptera
- Suborder: Polyphaga
- Infraorder: Cucujiformia
- Family: Chrysomelidae
- Genus: Dactylispa
- Species: D. aspersa

Binomial name
- Dactylispa aspersa (Gestro, 1897)

Synonyms
- Hispa aspersa Gestro, 1897; Dactylispa aspera; Dactylispa aspersa matangensis Weise, 1922

Species of beetle

Dactylispa aspersa is a species of beetle of the family Chrysomelidae. It is found in Indonesia (Sulawesi, Java, Sumatra), Malaysia and the Philippines (Negros).

== Life history ==
The recorded host plant for this species is Gardenia augusta.
