= Mary Motley Kalergis =

American photographer

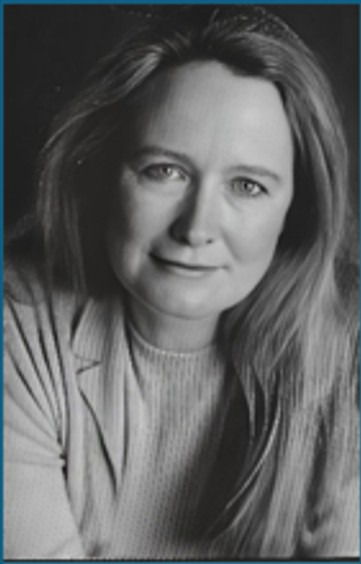
- Born: July 4, 1951 (age 75); Norfolk, Virginia, U.S.
- Education: Hollins University
- Occupations: Photographer, author, interviewer
- Spouse: David Kalergis
- Website: Official website

Mary Motley Kalergis (born July 4, 1951) is an American photographer, author, and interviewer. She has published books that combine photographic portraits with first-person accounts on family, identity, and community. Her book Seen and Heard: Teenagers Talk About Their Lives (1998) was selected for YALSA’s Best Books for Young Adults (2000) and the Quick Picks for Reluctant Young Adult Readers Top 10 (2000).

Kalergis' work has been exhibited at the Smithsonian’s National Museum of American History in Home of the Brave: Contemporary American Immigrants and in regional museums.

== Early life and education ==
Kalergis was born on July 4, 1951, in Norfolk, Virginia, and grew up in Charlottesville. She studied art history at Hollins College (now Hollins University), earning a Bachelor of Arts degree in 1973.

== Career ==
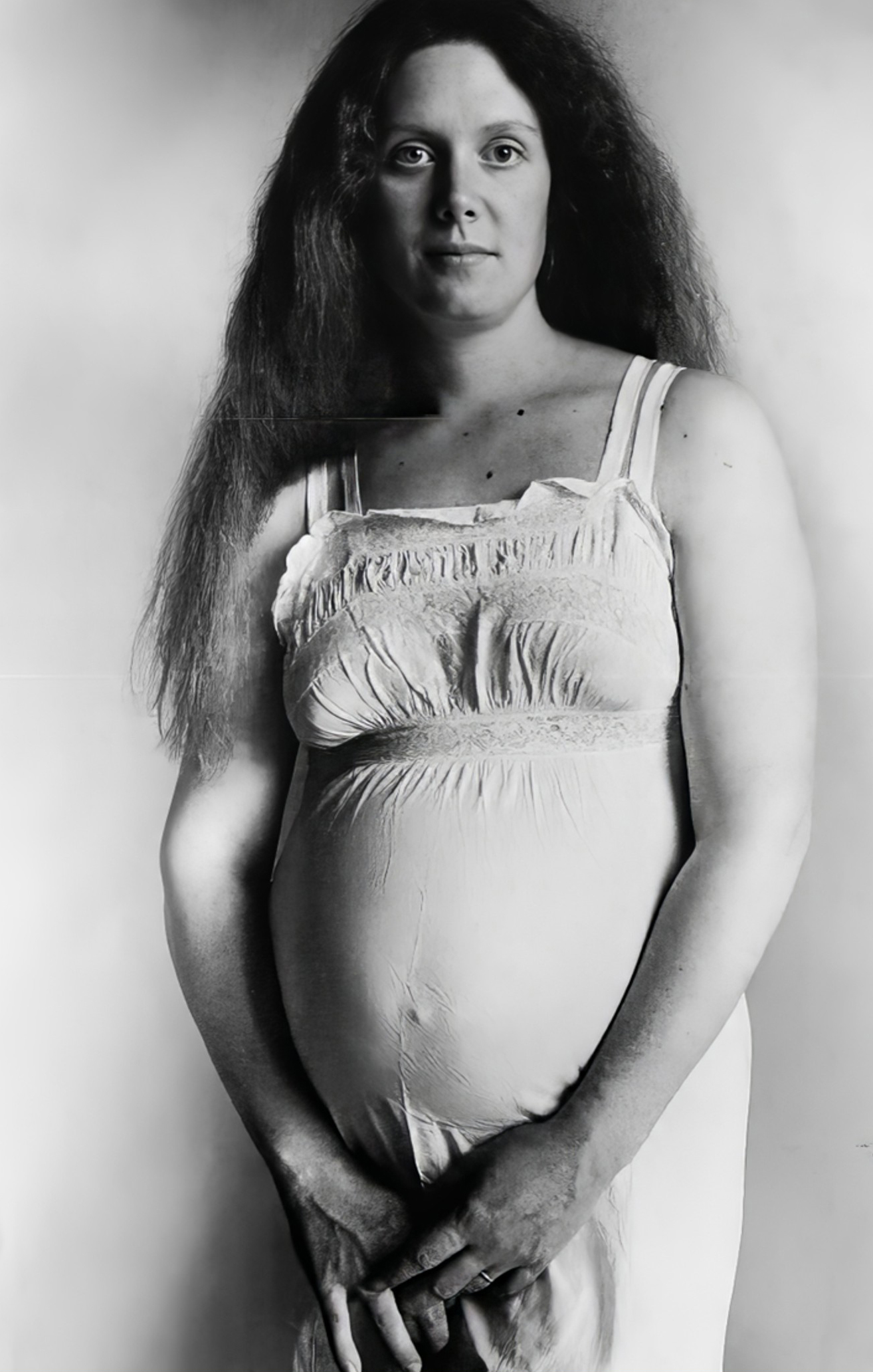
Giving Birth 1981

Cornell Capa, Founder of ICP 1989

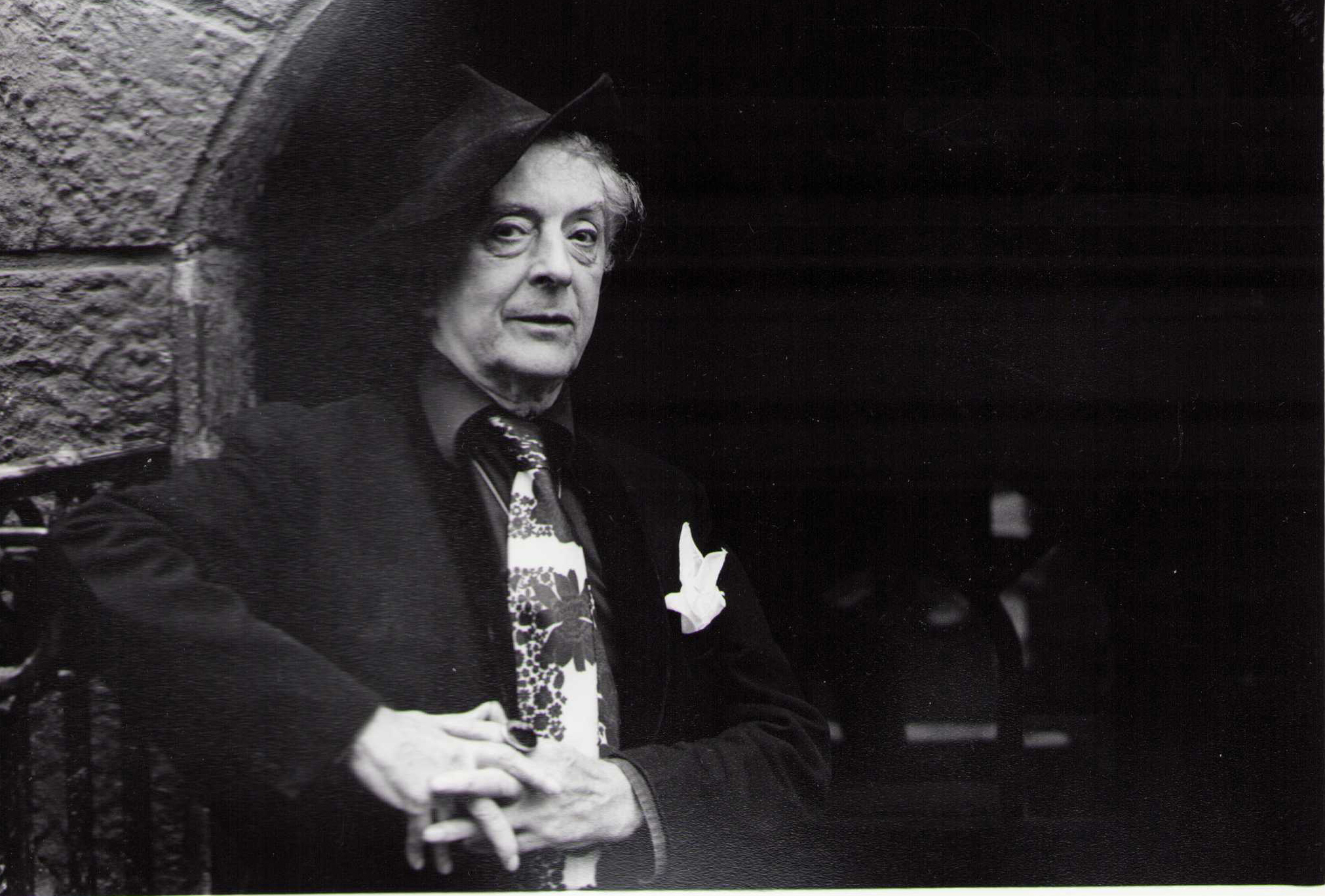
Quentin Crisp photographed for the Guardian 1984

After graduating from Hollins College in 1973, Kalergis worked at Rufus W. Holsinger’s Studio in Charlottesville, Virginia, where she began photographing and interviewing women during childbirth. This work became the basis of her first book, Giving Birth, published in 1983 by Harper & Row under the editorship of Craig Nelson.

In 1982 she moved to New York City and began teaching and exhibiting at the International Center of Photography. During this period she also collaborated with British writer Linda Blandford on a column for The Guardian and photographed cultural figures such as Helen Mirren and Quentin Crisp.

In the late 1980s, she produced Mother: A Collective Portrait (1987), Home of the Brave: Contemporary American Immigrants (1989), and With This Ring: A Portrait of Marriage (1997), created for the Chrysler Museum of Art. Her 1998 book Seen and Heard: Teenagers Talk About Their Lives paired portraits of adolescents with interviews about their lives.

In 2000 she released Charlottesville Portrait, followed by Love in Black & White (2002), which examined interracial marriage. She later published Considering Adoption (2010) and Foxhunters Speak: An Oral History of American Foxhunting (2017), which combined oral histories with photographic portraits of the American foxhunting community.

Alongside her publications, Kalergis has worked as a photographer in the film industry, contributing to productions including The Long Walk Home, Trading Mom, The Heart Is a Lonely Hunter, and Cousin Bette. She has also taught photography at the International Center of Photography, the University of Virginia, and privately in Charlottesville.

== Exhibitions and collections ==
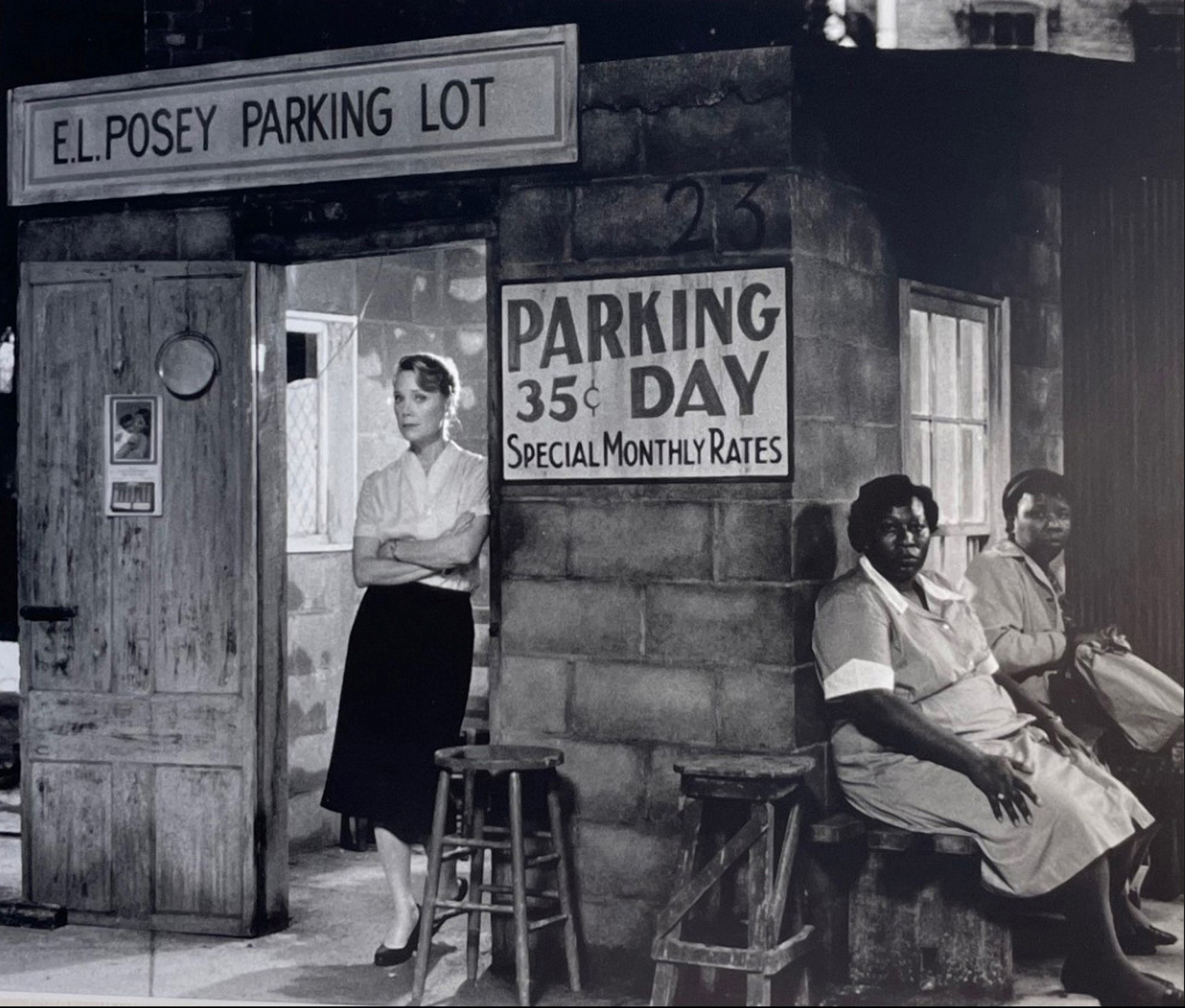
The Long Walk Home 1990

Kalergis’ first exhibition was presented in 1981 at the Bayly Museum of the University of Virginia, featuring work that later became part of Giving Birth.

In 1997, her project With This Ring: A Portrait of Marriage was presented at the Chrysler Museum of Art and later traveled to the Bayly Art Museum of the University of Virginia. Subsequent projects were also accompanied by exhibitions, including Charlottesville Portrait (2000), which was displayed in Charlottesville.

Kalergis’ work is represented in public and institutional collections. The Smithsonian Libraries include her work in their Art and Artist Files collection, and several of her gelatin silver prints, including Parents with a Sick Child (1991) and A Kiss (1991), are held by the Fralin Museum of Art at the University of Virginia.

Her images have also appeared in anthologies and publications issued by major publishers and institutions, including Aperture, Pantheon/Smithsonian, and National Geographic. Among these are Generations: A Universal Family Album (Pantheon/Smithsonian Institution, 1987), In Celebration of Babies (Ballantine, 1987), We Didn’t Have Much, But We Sure Had Plenty (Anchor/Doubleday, 1989), and In Their Mothers’ Eyes: Women Photographers and Their Children (Edition Stemmle, 2000), which present her portraiture within the broader documentary and family photography tradition.

The American Library Association listed her book Seen and Heard: Teenagers Talk About Their Lives (1998) in its Best Books for Young Adults catalogue in 2000, placing it in library collections nationwide.

== Reception ==
The Boston Globe described Giving Birth (1983) as "a moving, sensitive and concerned photographic look at the universal experience," the Chicago Tribune called Mother: A Collective Portrait (1987) "a stunning collection, ranging from joyous to heart-rending," and USA Today referred to Seen and Heard: Teenagers Talk About Their Lives (1998) as "a photographic exploration and celebration of mainstream American adolescence." In 2000 the American Library Association included Seen and Heard in its Best Books for Young Adults, Quick Picks for Reluctant Young Adult Readers — Top Ten, and the Young Adult Library Services Association (YALSA) Best Fiction for Young Adults.

Regional and professional publications also reviewed Kalergis’s work. The Richmond Times-Dispatch reviewed With This Ring: A Portrait of Marriage (1997), noting its focus on long-term partnerships and commitment. An earlier review in Charlottesville’s Observer of her 1981 Bayly Museum exhibition noted Kalergis’s focus on the human form. Publishers Weekly listed Charlottesville Portrait (2000) in its fall hardcover preview: “B&w photos celebrate this city's denizens”.

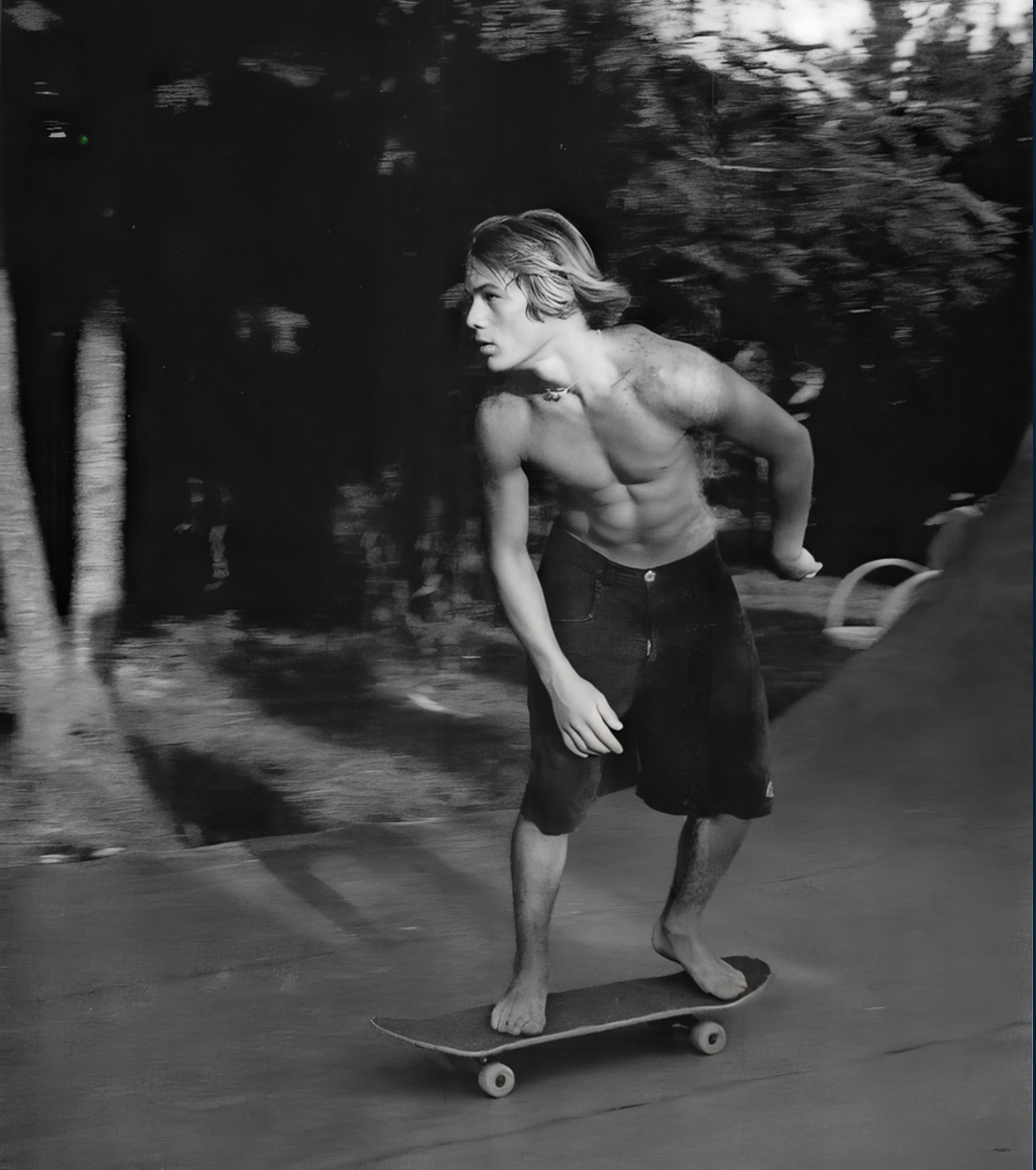
Seen and Heard 1998

== Selected works ==
=== Books ===
- Giving Birth (Harper & Row, 1983).ISBN 9780060151812
- Mother: A Collective Portrait (E.P. Dutton, 1987).ISBN 9780525245254
- Home of the Brave: Contemporary American Immigrants (E.P. Dutton, 1989).ISBN 9780525247623
- With This Ring: A Portrait of Marriage (Chrysler Museum of Art, 1997).ISBN 9780940744677
- Seen and Heard: Teenagers Talk About Their Lives (Stewart, Tabori & Chang, 1998).ISBN 9781556708343
- Charlottesville Portrait (Howell Press, 2000).ISBN 9781574271171
- Love in Black & White (Kensington Books, 2002).ISBN 9780758202079
- Considering Adoption (Atelerix Press, 2010).ISBN 9780989926355
- Foxhunters Speak: An Oral History of American Foxhunting (Rowman & Littlefield Press, 2017).ISBN 9781564162151
