= Branched-chain dicarboxylic acids =

Branched-chain dicarboxylic acids are a class of dicarboxylic acids in which a central carbon atom is bound to three or more carbon atoms.

Long-chain dicarboxylic acids containing vicinal dimethyl branching near the centre of the carbon chain have been discovered in the genus Butyrivibrio, bacteria which participate in the digestion of cellulose in the rumen. These fatty acids, named diabolic acids, have a chain length depending on the fatty acid used in the culture medium. The most abundant diabolic acid in Butyrivibrio had a 32-carbon chain length. Diabolic acids were also detected in the core lipids of the genus Thermotoga of the order Thermotogales, bacteria living in solfatara springs, deep-sea marine hydrothermal systems and high-temperature marine and continental oil fields. It was shown that about 10% of their lipid fraction were symmetrical C30 to C34 diabolic acids. The C30 (13,14-dimethyloctacosanedioic acid) and C32 (15,16-dimethyltriacontanedioic acid) diabolic acids have been described in Thermotoga maritima.

Some parent C29 to C32 diacids but with methyl groups on the carbons C-13 and C-16 have been isolated and characterized from the lipids of thermophilic anaerobic bacterium Thermoanaerobacter ethanolicus. The most abundant diacid was the C30 α,ω-13,16-dimethyloctacosanedioic acid.

Biphytanic diacids are present in geological sediments and are considered as tracers of past anaerobic oxidation of methane. Several forms without or with one or two pentacyclic rings have been detected in Cenozoic seep limestones. These lipids may be unrecognized metabolites from Archaea.

Crocetin

Crocetin is the core compound of crocins (crocetin glycosides), which are the main red pigments of the stigmas of saffron (Crocus sativus) and the fruits of gardenia (Gardenia jasminoides).

== Alkylitaconates ==
Itaconic acid

Several dicarboxylic acids having an alkyl side chain and an itaconate core have been isolated from lichens and fungi, itaconic acid (methylenesuccinic acid) being a metabolite produced by filamentous fungi. Among these compounds, several analogues, called chaetomellic acids with different chain lengths and degrees of unsaturation have been isolated from various species of the lichen Chaetomella. These molecules were shown to be valuable as basis for the development of anticancer drugs due to their strong farnesyltransferase inhibitory effects.

A series of alkyl- and alkenyl-itaconates, known as ceriporic acids, were found in cultures of a selective lignin-degrading fungus (white rot fungus), Ceriporiopsis subvermispora. The absolute configuration of ceriporic acids, their stereoselective biosynthetic pathway and the diversity of their metabolites have been discussed in detail.
