= Gentiobiose =

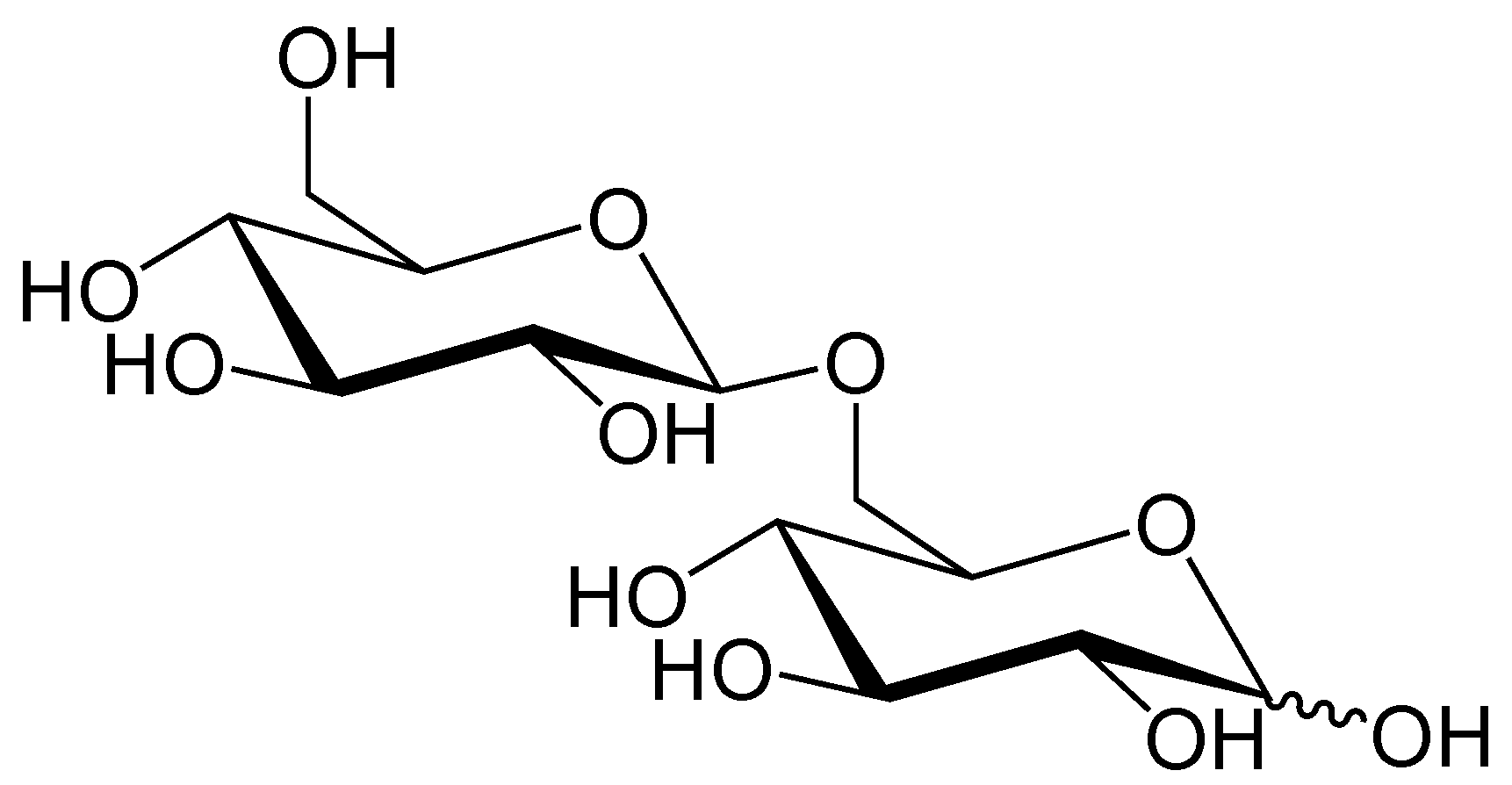
- Gentiobiose

Names
- IUPAC names β-D-Glucopyranosyl-(1→6)-D-glucopyranose; 6-O-β-D-glucopyranosyl-D-glucopyranose
- Other names amygdalose

Identifiers
CAS Number	554-91-6
3D model (JSmol)	Interactive image
ChEBI	CHEBI:28066
ChemSpider	390156
PubChem CID	441422
UNII	HF30HB040V
CompTox Dashboard (EPA)	DTXSID501317544
- InChI: InChI=1S/C12H22O11/c13-1-3-5(14)8(17)10(19)12(23-3)21-2-4-6(15)7(16)9(18)11(20)22-4/h3-20H,1-2H2/t3-,4-,5-,6-,7+,8+,9-,10-,11-,12-/m1/s1 Key: DLRVVLDZNNYCBX-LIZSDCNHSA-N
- SMILES: O(C[C@H]1O[C@@H](O)[C@H](O)[C@@H](O)[C@@H]1O)[C@@H]2O[C@@H]([C@@H](O)[C@H](O)[C@H]2O)CO

Properties
Chemical formula	C_{12}H_{22}O_{11}
Molar mass	342.297 g·mol^{−1}
Density	1.768 g/mL
Melting point	190 to 195 °C (374 to 383 °F; 463 to 468 K)
- Except where otherwise noted, data are given for materials in their standard state (at 25 °C [77 °F], 100 kPa). verify (what is ?) Infobox references

Gentiobiose is a disaccharide composed of two units of D-glucose joined with a β(1→6) linkage. It is a white crystalline solid that is soluble in water or hot methanol. Gentiobiose is incorporated into the chemical structure of crocin, the chemical compound that gives saffron its color. It is a product of the caramelization of glucose. During a starch hydrolysis process for glucose syrup, gentiobiose, which has bitterness, is formed as an undesirable product through the acid-catalyzed condensation reaction of two D-glucose molecules. A further elongation of the unit elongation of the bitter disaccharide by a third β-D-glucose to give the trimer gentiotriose reduces its bitterness by a fifth. Gentiobiose is also produced via enzymatic hydrolysis of glucans, including pustulan and β-1,3-1,6-glucan.
