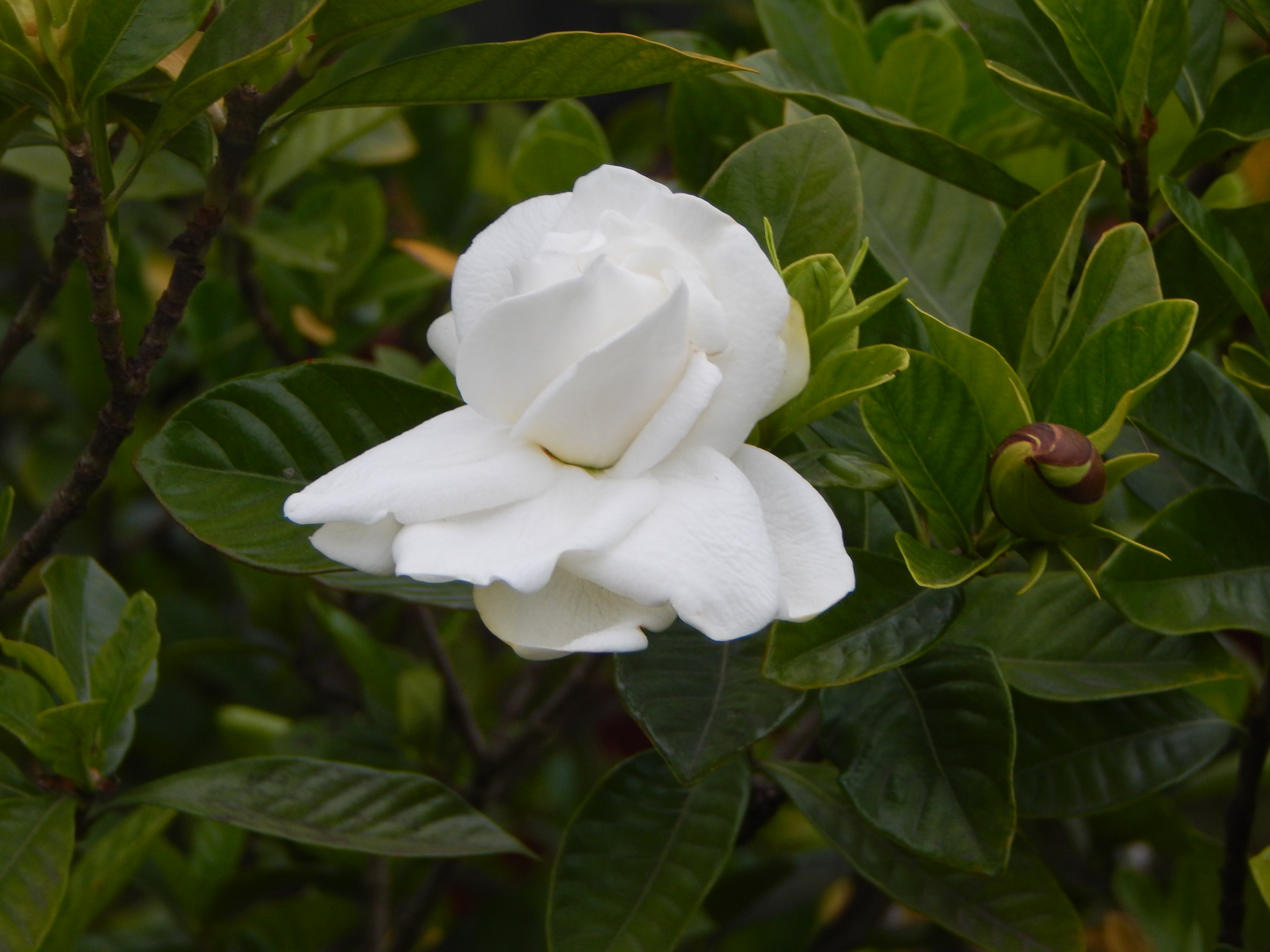

Scientific classification
- Kingdom: Plantae
- Clade: Embryophytes
- Clade: Tracheophytes
- Clade: Angiosperms
- Clade: Eudicots
- Clade: Asterids
- Order: Gentianales
- Family: Rubiaceae
- Genus: Gardenia
- Species: G. jasminoides

Binomial name
- Gardenia jasminoides J.Ellis

Synonyms
- List: Jasminum capense Mill.; Gardenia angustifolia G.Lodd.; Gardenia augusta Merr.; Gardenia augusta f. shanpinensis F.C.Ho; Gardenia florida L.; Gardenia grandiflora Lour.; Gardenia grandiflora Siebold ex Zucc.; Gardenia jasminoides f. kueishanensis F.C.Ho; Gardenia jasminoides f. longicarpa Z.M.Xie & M.Okada; Gardenia longisepala (Masam.) Masam.; Gardenia pictorum Hassk.; Gardenia radicans Thunb.; Genipa florida (L.) Baill.; Genipa grandiflora (Lour.) Baill.; Genipa radicans (Thunb.) Baill.; Mussaenda chinensis Lour.; Warneria augusta L.

= Gardenia jasminoides =

Species of evergreen flowering plant

Gardenia jasminoides, commonly known as gardenia and cape jasmine, is an evergreen flowering plant in the coffee family Rubiaceae. It is native to the subtropical and northern tropical parts of the Far East. Wild plants range from 30 centimetres to 3 metres (about 1 to 10 feet) in height. They have a rounded habit with very dense branches with opposite leaves that are lanceolate-oblong, leathery or gathered in groups on the same node and by a dark green, shiny and slightly waxy surface and prominent veins.

With its shiny green leaves and heavily fragrant white summer flowers, it is widely used in gardens in tropical, subtropical, and warm temperate climates. It also is used as a houseplant in temperate climates. It has been in cultivation in China for at least a thousand years, and it was introduced to English gardens in the mid-18th century. Many varieties have been bred for horticulture, with low-growing, and large, and long-flowering forms.

== Description ==
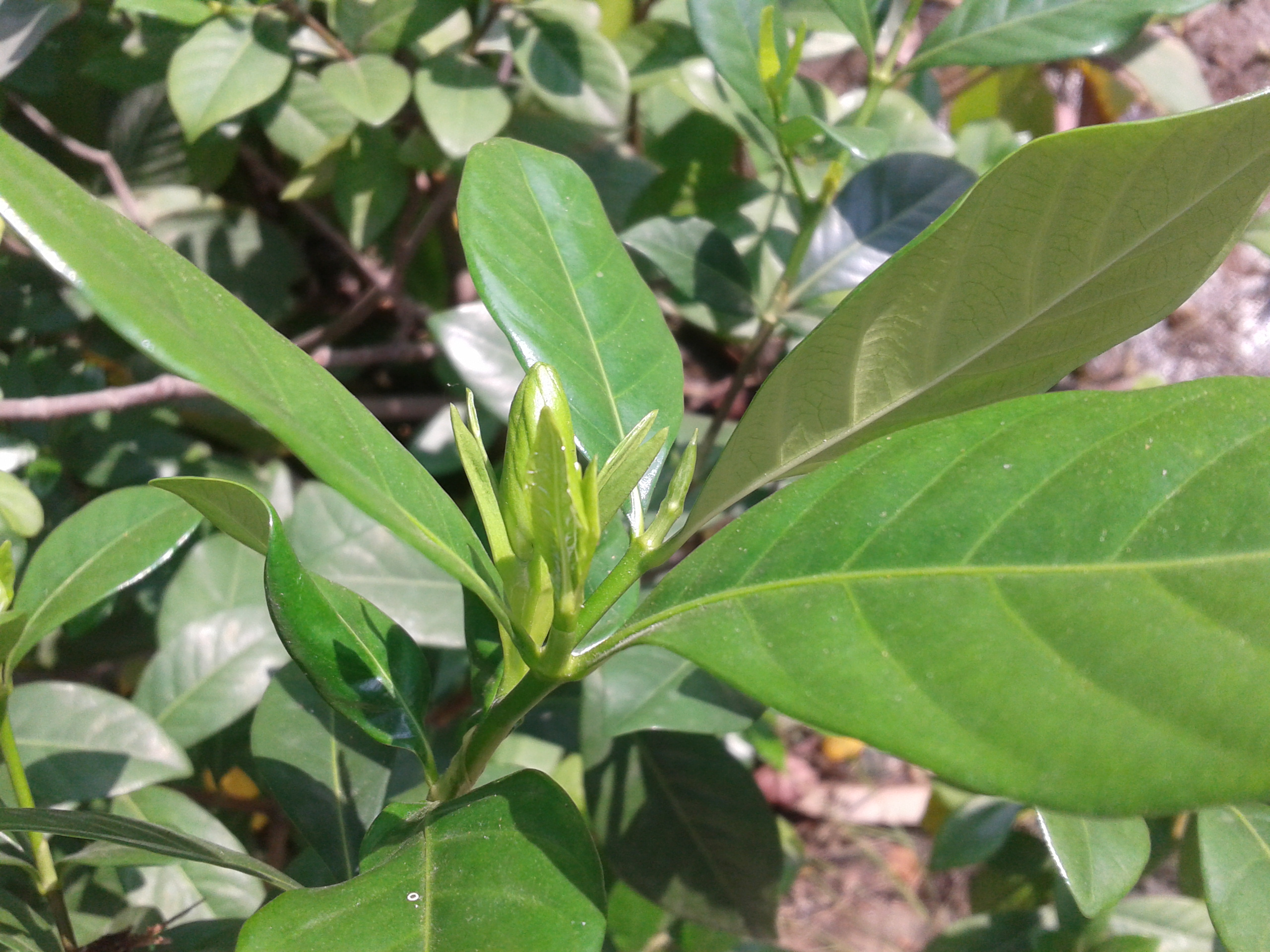
Leaves of Gardenia jasminoides

Gardenia jasminoides is a shrub that ranges from 30 cm to 3 m (1–10 ft) high in the wild, with cylindrical to flat branches that at first are covered with caducous hairs that fall early, leaving the branch smooth. The leaves are in opposite pairs or rarely in groups of three along the branches. They are either subsessile (almost without a petiole) or on short 0.5–1 centimetre (0.2–0.4 inches) petioles. The leaves themselves are 3–25 cm (1.2–9.8 in) long by 1.5–8 cm (0.6–3.1 in) wide and can be oblong-lanceolate, obovate-oblong, obovate, oblanceolate, or elliptic in shape. Their upper surface is smooth and shiny, or slightly hairy along the primary veins, while the undersurface is sparsely hairy to smooth. Each leaf has 8 to 15 pairs of secondary veins. The flowers are solitary and terminal, arising from the ends of the stems.

The white flowers have a matte texture, in contrast to the glossy leaves. They gradually take on a creamy yellow color and a waxy surface. They can be quite large, up to 10 cm (4 in) in diameter, loosely funnel-shaped, and there are double-flowered forms. Blooming in summer and autumn, they are among the most strongly fragrant of all flowers. They are followed by small and oval fruits.

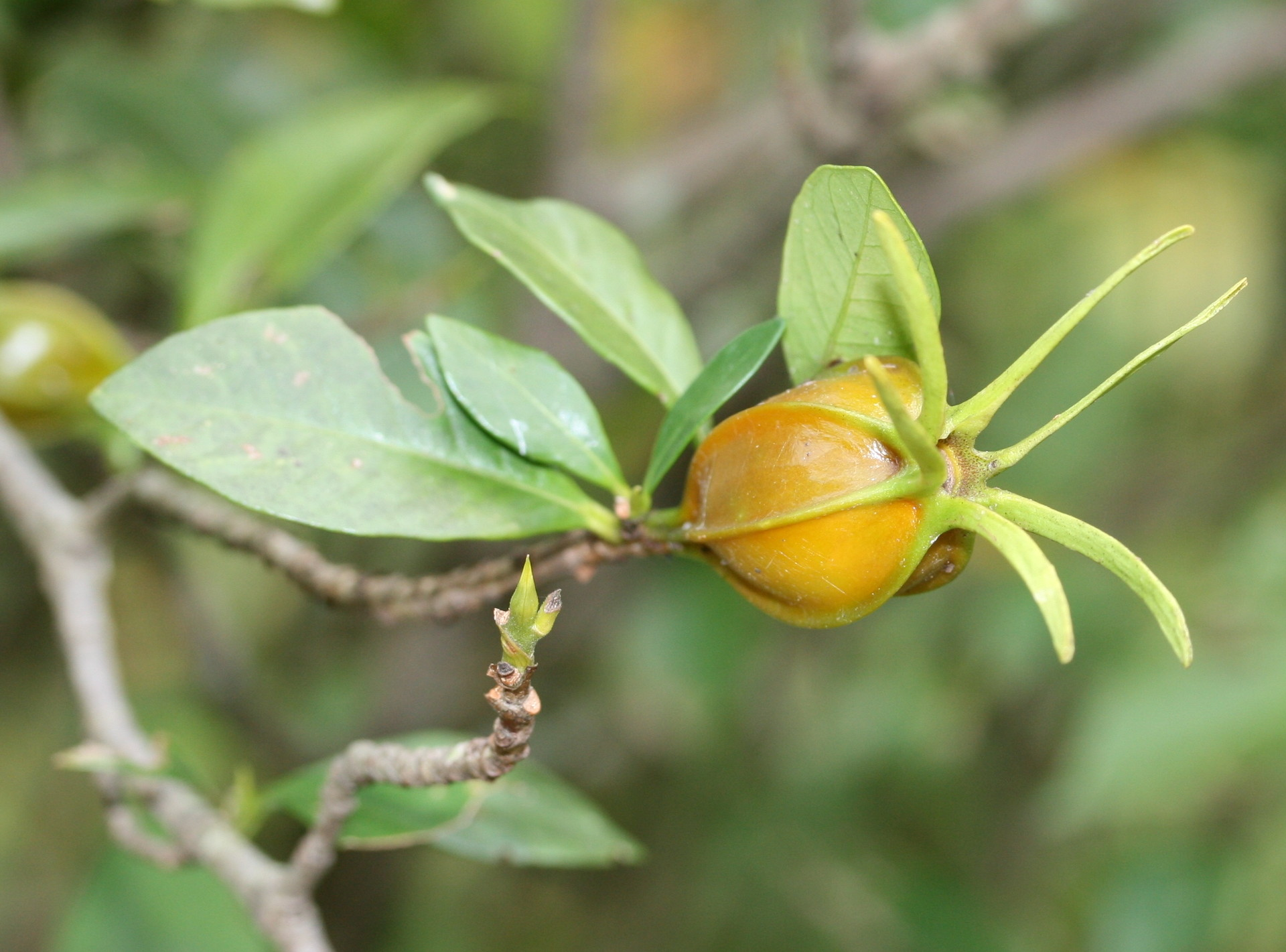
Young fruit of Gardenia jasminoides

The flowers of jasmine gardenia are all simultaneous hermaphrodites.

== Taxonomy ==
German-Dutch botanist Georg Rumphius had seen Gardenia jasminoides on the island of Amboina (Ambon), noting in his Herbarium Amboinense around 1700 that it was a "delightful ornament" called catsjopiri or catsjopiring in Malay. He reported that it had been imported there from Batavia (Jakarta). Swedish taxonomist Carl Linnaeus recognized the value of Rumphius' work and assigned his student Olaf Stickman to study it. Stickman's dissertation was printed in 1754. He subsequently described the species as Varneria augusta in 1759.

English naturalist John Ellis described Gardenia jasminoides in 1761, having realised on dissecting the flower that it was not closely related to jasmine and warranted a new genus. He had initially proposed Warneria after the original plant's owner in England. However, Warner declined to have it named for him and so Ellis chose Gardenia to honour Scottish naturalist Alexander Garden. Ellis had also proposed Augusta as a generic name, which Linnaeus rejected. It gained its association with the name jasmine when botanist and artist Georg Dionysius Ehret depicted it. Ehret queried whether it was a jasmine because the flowers resembled the plant. The name stuck and lived on as common name and scientific epithet.

Linnaeus gave it the name Gardenia florida in 1762 in the second edition of his Species Plantarum. American botanist Elmer D. Merrill followed Stickman with Gardenia augusta in 1917; however, Rumphius' original work was later deemed insufficient to describe the species, so these names are nomina nuda.

Also based on Rumphius' work, Swedish naturalist Carl Peter Thunberg gave it the name Gardenia radicans in his 1780 work on the genus entitled Dissertatio botanica de Gardenia. London nurseryman Conrad Loddiges described a form he had in cultivation as Gardenia angustifolia in 1821, holding it to be distinct on the basis of its narrow leaves.

Gardenia jasminoides is highly variable in morphology, particularly in the sizes of leaves, calyx lobes and corollas in different populations. This has led to Chinese authorities describing several varieties that are not accepted elsewhere. W.C. Chen gave the name G. jasminoides var. fortuneana to a large double-flowered sterile form that does not produce seed and is widely cultivated.

The common names cape jasmine and cape jessamine derive from the earlier belief that the flower originated in Cape of Good Hope, South Africa. Other common names include danh-danh and jasmin.

== Distribution and habitat ==
Gardenia jasminoides is native to southern East Asia, mainland Southeast Asia, and northeastern South Asia, including Nepal, Bangladesh, Cambodia, East Himalaya, Hainan, Japan, Laos, mainland China, Taiwan, Thailand and Vietnam, where its native habitat is forest and undergrowth along streams, and on sloping and hilly terrain to an altitude of 1,500 metres (4,900 feet). The species has been introduced to other areas with suitable climate and habitat, including Caroline Islands, Comoros, Korea, Marianas, Marshall Islands, Society Islands and Tubuai Islands.

== Cultivation ==
Cultivars of Gardenia jasminoides

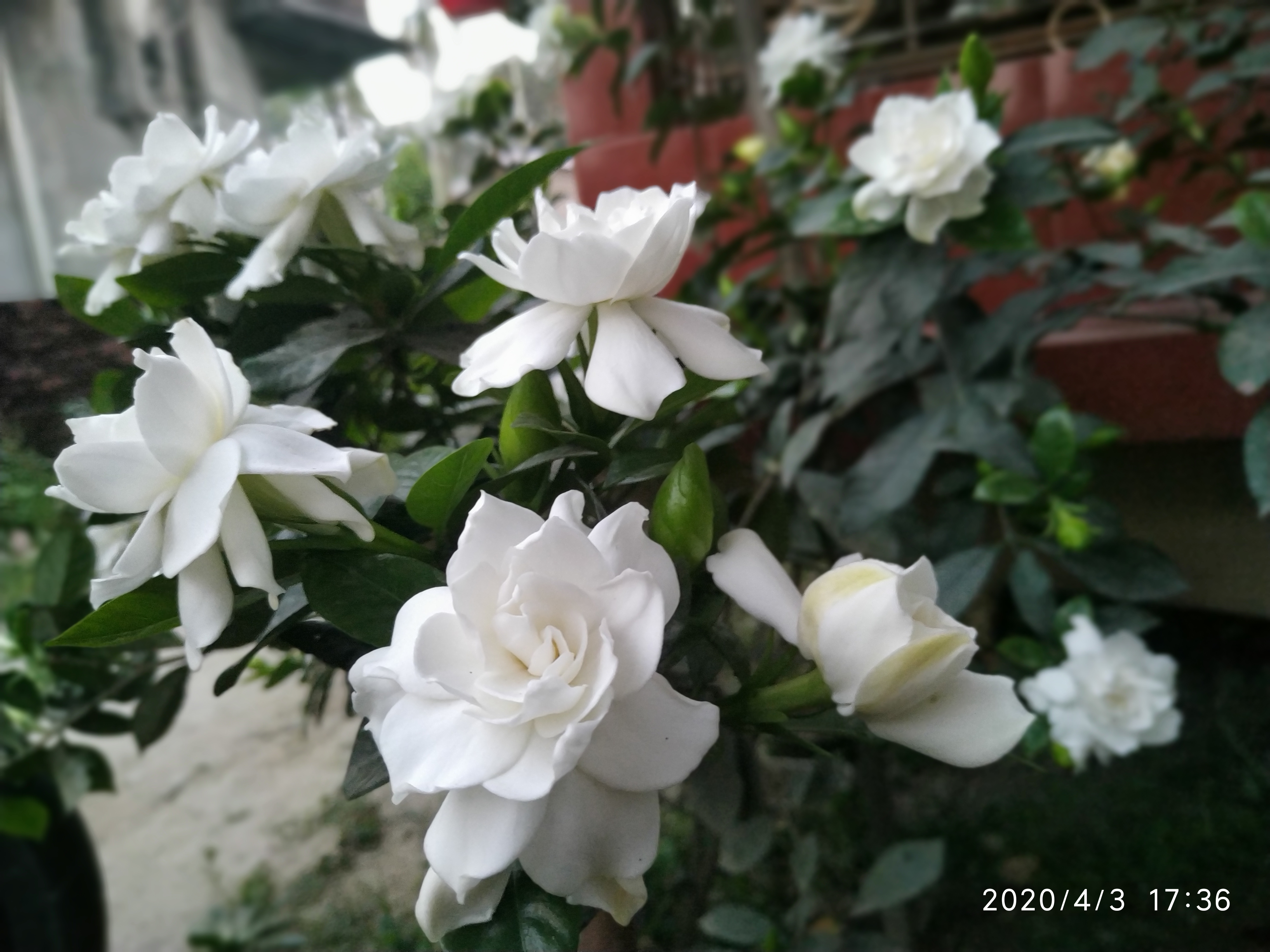
a double-flowered form

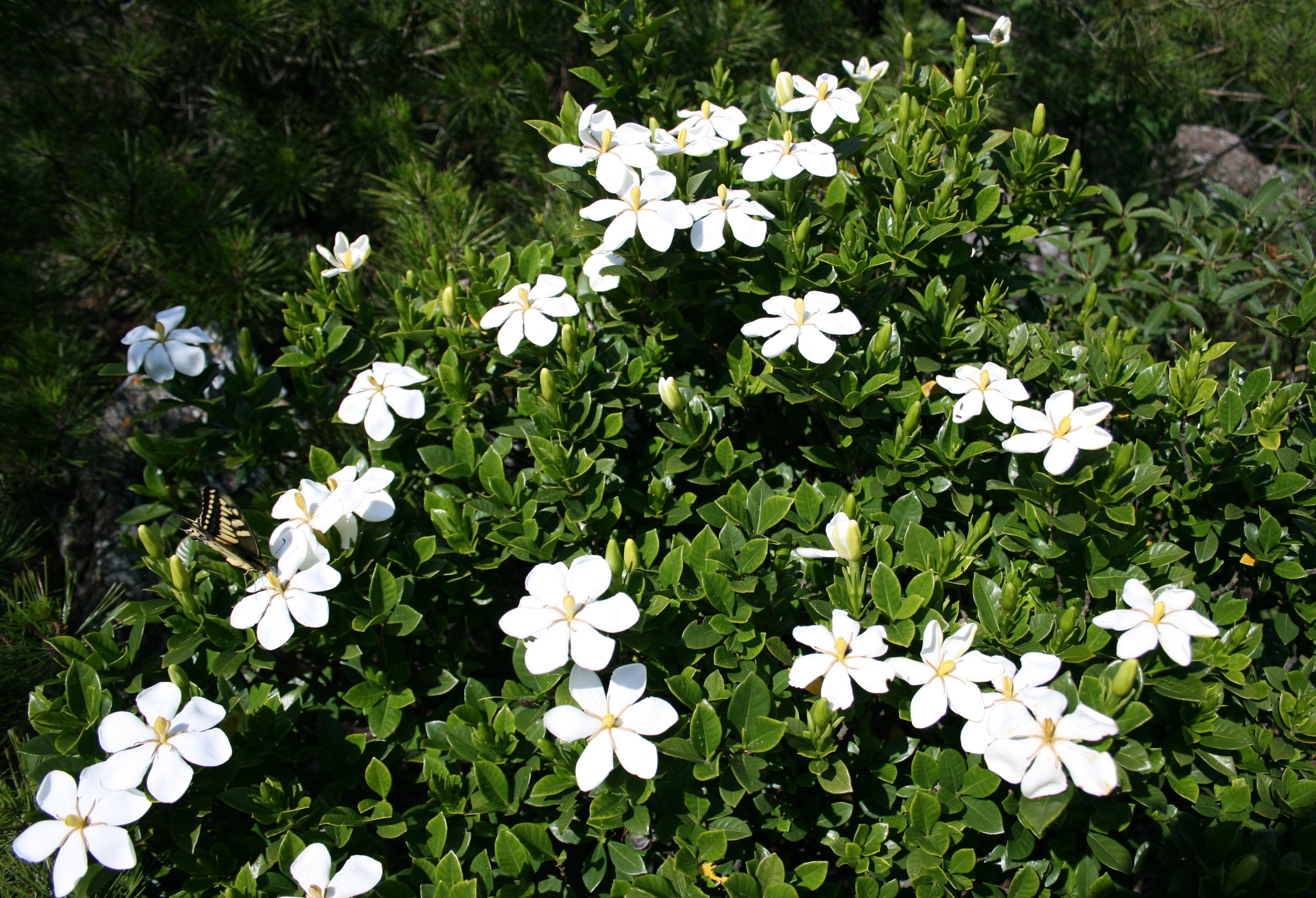
a single-petaled form, Japan

Evidence of G. jasminoides in cultivation in China dates to the Song dynasty (960–1279 AD), where both single- and double-flowered forms have been depicted in paintings, such as those of the Song emperor Huizong, and the tenth-century artist Xu Xi. The Yuan dynasty (1271–1368) saw it on lacquerware, and the Ming dynasty on porcelain (1368–1644). Called zhi-zi in traditional Chinese medicine, it was a folk remedy for jaundice, oedema and fevers. English statesman Sir John Barrow saw gardenias in nurseries in Guangzhou, China, in 1794.

G. jasminoides came to Europe via the Cape Colony in southern Africa, which had been founded in 1652 as a way-station between the Netherlands and Asia. There, Daniel Des Marets, Superintendent of the Dutch estates of William III, collected material that ended up in the herbarium of English naturalist Hans Sloane in the 1680s. Swedish naturalist Daniel Solander reported that the living species was brought to the United Kingdom (UK) from the Cape Colony in 1744 on the British East India Ship Godolphin by Captain William Hutchenson, who gave it to botanist Richard Warner of Woodford Row, Essex. The plant reportedly remained in flower for much of voyage. Warner, however, was unable to propagate it until the botanist John Ellis recommended James Gordon, a gardener at Mile End. Gordon was successful in August 1757, and plants sold well thereafter. Each cutting-grown plant fetched five guineas. Gardenias were first grown in the United States in 1762, in Garden's Charleston garden. He had moved there 10 years previously.

In cultivation in the UK, Gardenia jasminoides has gained the Royal Horticultural Society's Award of Garden Merit. Highly regarded for its fragrant summer flowers and attractive foliage, it is used as a specimen feature or as a hedging or screening plant.

Widely used as a garden plant in warm temperate and subtropical gardens, Gardenia jasminoides is hardy in USDA hardiness zones 8 to 10, or zone H1C in the UK (outdoor temperatures above 5 °C (41 °F)). It requires good drainage and a location in a sunny or part-shaded location, and it prefers an acidic soil with a pH between 5.0 and 6.5. In temperate latitudes, gardenias are usually cultivated as houseplants or in greenhouses. If the soil is not acidic enough, many of its nutrients (especially iron compounds) will not be available for the plant, since they will not dilute in water, so will not be absorbed by the roots. When this happens, gardenias start to develop chlorosis with the main symptom of a yellowing of the leaves. Iron chelate can be added to the soil to lower the pH, maybe recurrently if the water supply is hard.

=== Cultivars ===
Many cultivars have been developed, and double-flowered forms are most popular. Gardenia 'Radicans' is a low-growing groundcover which reaches 15–45 cm (6–18 in) and spreads up to a metre wide, while G. 'Fortuniana' and G. 'Mystery' are double-flowered cultivars. The former was sent by Scottish botanist Robert Fortune in 1844 to the Royal Horticultural Society in London. The latter has a large upright habit and has been a popular variety for hedging. It reaches 1.8 to 2.5 m (6 to 8 ft) high and wide. Unlike other varieties, G. 'Golden Magic' bears flowers which change to a golden yellow relatively early after opening white. It grows to 1.5 m (5 ft) high and 1 m (3.5 ft) wide.

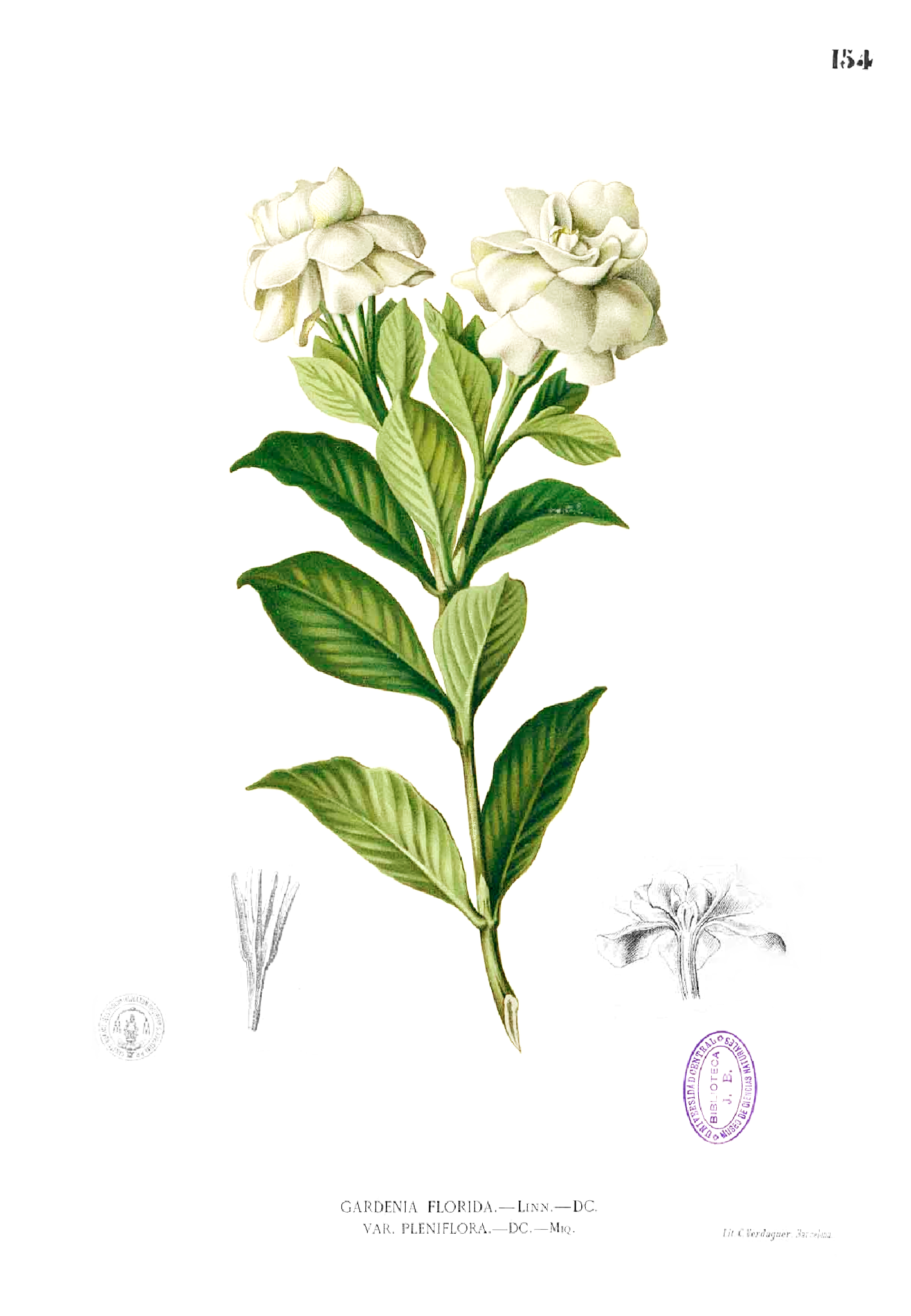
1880s botanical drawing

Gardenia 'Aimee' is an early-flowering (spring) form. Cultivars such as G. 'Shooting Star' and G. 'Chuck Hayes' are more cold-hardy, roughly to Zone 7. G. 'Kleim's Hardy' is a dwarf form to 1 m high and wide with star-shaped flowers, it is tolerant to Zone 7. G. 'Crown Jewel' is a hybrid from G. 'Kleim's Hardy' crossed with G. 'Chuck Hayes' that can grow in sheltered locations in Zone 6. It grows to 1 m high by 1.5 m wide (3 ft by 5 ft). G. 'Summer Snow' is (Patent number PP22797) a cultivar tolerant to USDA Zone 6 that grows to 1.5 m (5 ft) high with flowers to 11 cm (4.5 in) diameter.

== Uses ==
Gardenia flowers can be eaten raw, pickled, or preserved in honey. In China, the petals are used in tea for their aroma, while a yellow-red dye used in textiles and sweets has been extracted from the pulp of the fruit. Gardenia jasminoides fructus (fruit) is used in traditional Chinese medicine to "drain fire" and treat certain febrile conditions. It has anti-inflammatory and antipyretic effects.

Shishihakuhito is a Chinese herbal medicine mainly composed of gardenia fruit and is used to treat atopic dermatitis. It inhibits Immunoglobulin E (IgE) mediated histamine release.

In 2020, a case of someone who had developed blue-gray discoloration of the skin as a result of chronic intake of gardenia fruit extract was published.

=== Chemistry ===
As of 2020, at least 162 compounds have been identified in Gardenia jasminoides. The iridoids genipin and geniposidic acid can be found in G. jasminoides fruit.

Crocetin, a chemical compound usually obtained from Crocus sativus, also can be obtained from the fruit of Gardenia jasminoides. The fully matured fruit were found to contain crocin in a concentration of 4.5 mg of total crocetin derivatives per gram (dry weight), and can be used as a yellow dye to color clothing and food.

== Cultural significance ==
=== Buddhism ===
Gardenia flowers are commonly used as floral offerings at Buddhist temples in Tropical Asia.

=== Japanese Shogi and Go ===
The legs of seated-style Shogi and Go boards from Japan are traditionally carved in the image of gardenia fruits. In the Japanese language, "gardenia" (kuchinashi, くちなし) is a homophone of "no mouth" (kuchinashi, 口無し). This symbolizes that neither players nor spectators are allowed to speak during a game.

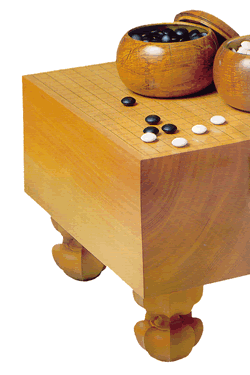
Japanese Go board showing legs in the shape of gardenia fruits.

=== Meitei culture ===
Giving reference to Meitei King Khagemba and the Manipur Kingdom, the beauty and grace of Lei Kabok, also called Kabok Lei (Gardenia jasminoides), is described by Meitei King Charairongba, in his literary work, "Leiron" (Meitei: ꯂꯩꯔꯣꯟ) which is an account on the description of 100 flowers and orchids, endemic as well as exotic species in Kangleipak, as follows:

It is a flower that remains ever fresh as not eaten by worms and is fondly sought after in the four corners of the country, eight directions, nay in all quarters. It is distinct for its beautiful shape, its tender stalk and for its pure white colour. It is a flower once nurtured by King Khagemba who preferred to take it with him even for his long home. It is a flower that comes handy to both boys and girls as a present of love. Such a luscious flower has blossomed forth in an unending array of white and definitely the season is of this flower.

— Leiron, Charairongba
