= Crocetane =

- Skeletal formula of phytane

Names
- IUPAC name 2,6,11,15-Tetramethylhexadecane

Identifiers
CAS Number	504-44-9
3D model (JSmol)	Interactive image
ChemSpider	120105
EC Number	211-332-2
PubChem CID	136331
UNII	S747NXV5QK
CompTox Dashboard (EPA)	DTXSID80964656
- InChI: InChI=1S/C20H42/c1-17(2)11-9-15-19(5)13-7-8-14-20(6)16-10-12-18(3)4/h17-20H,7-16H2,1-6H3 Key: KKFZXXATNGJPJS-UHFFFAOYSA-N
- SMILES: CC(C)CCCC(C)CCCCC(C)CCCC(C)C

Properties
Chemical formula	C_{20}H_{42}
Molar mass	282.556 g·mol^{−1}

Related compounds
Related alkanes	Phytane
- Except where otherwise noted, data are given for materials in their standard state (at 25 °C [77 °F], 100 kPa). Infobox references

Crocetane, or 2,6,11,15-tetramethylhexadecane, is an isoprenoid hydrocarbon. Unlike its isomer phytane, crocetane has a tail-to-tail linked isoprenoid skeleton. Crocetane has been detected in modern sediments and geological records as a biomarker, often associated with anaerobic methane oxidation.

== Research ==
Crocetane was first studied in the late 1920s and early 1930s for the structural identification of crocetin, which is its polyunsaturated diacid analogue. The infrared spectrum was reported in 1950, the mass spectrum was described in 1968 and the ^{1}H and ^{13}C NMR spectra was obtained in 1990s.

In 1994, Liangqiao Bian first reported strong ^{13}C depletion in crocetane from anoxic sediments in the Kattegat. Such low ^{13}C content is thought to originate from microbes harvesting biogenic methane, which is always ^{13}C depleted, as a carbon source. Years later several groups made similar observations in either modern or ancient sediments near methane seeps. Crocetane was found in environments with anaerobic methane oxidizing consortium, composed of methanotrophic archea and sulfate-reducing bacteria. These work makes crocetane the first biomarker of anaerobic methanotrophy.

In 2009, Ercin Maslen and her colleagues detected crocetane in highly-mature Devonian sediments and crude oils of the Western Canada Sedimentary Basin. They propose that natural product precursor for this crocetane is green sulfur bacteria derived isorenieratene and palaerernieratene, which means that crocetane can also be related to photic zone euxinia in highly matured samples.

== Analysis ==
Due to structural similarities, crocetane often co-elutes with phytane and is hard to identify. People have been using specialized gas chromatographic methods to achieve partial separation. For example, Volker Thiel and his colleagues used a 25-m squalene capillary column with hydrogen as a carrier gas.

For the same reason mass spectra of crocetane and phytane are very similar except for that crocetane does not have intense m/z=183 fragments. To identify crocetane, the mass spectrometer can be operated in selection ion monitoring(SIM) mode to monitor m/z 113, 169, 183, 197 and 282. Paul Greenwood and Roger Summons in 2003 reported using GC MS-MS instrument to measure the daughter ion of m/z 196→127/126 and 168→126 to distinguish crocetane from phytane.
