= Oxygen diffusion-enhancing compound =

An oxygen diffusion-enhancing compound is any substance that increases the availability of oxygen in body tissues by influencing the molecular structure of water in blood plasma and thereby promoting the movement (diffusion) of oxygen through plasma. Oxygen diffusion-enhancing compounds have shown promise in the treatment of conditions associated with hypoxia (a lack of oxygen in tissues) and ischemia (a lack of oxygen in the circulating blood supply). Such conditions include hemorrhagic shock, myocardial infarction (heart attack), and stroke.

== Types ==
One of the first substances that was reported to produce an oxygen diffusion-enhancing effect was crocetin, a carotenoid that occurs naturally in plants such as crocus sativus, and is related to another carotenoid, saffron. Saffron has been used culturally (e.g., as a dye) and medicinally since ancient times.

Trans sodium crocetinate (TSC), a synthetic drug containing the carotenoid structure of trans crocetin has been extensively investigated in animal disease models and in human clinical trials. Clinical trials of TSC have focused on testing the compound's effectiveness in sensitizing hypoxic cancer cells to radiation therapy in patients with glioblastoma, an aggressive form of brain cancer.

TSC, which is being developed by Diffusion Pharmaceuticals, has been shown to enhance the oxygenation of hypoxic tumor tissue and belongs to a subclass of oxygen diffusion-enhancing compounds known as bipolar trans carotenoid salts. Diffusion Pharmaceuticals is currently investigating the use of trans sodium crocetinate in the treatment of COVID-19, acute stroke, and solid cancerous tumors.

== Mechanism of action ==
Oxygen diffusion-enhancing compounds are thought to act by exerting hydrophobic forces that interact with water molecules. These interactions result in greater hydrogen bonding among water molecules, which constitute the majority of the blood plasma medium. As hydrogen bonding increases, the overall molecular structure of water in the plasma becomes more lattice-like, a phenomenon known as structure building. Structure building reduces resistance to the movement of oxygen through plasma via diffusion. Since blood plasma offers the major barrier for oxygen to move from the red blood cells and into the tissues, the more structured character of water imparted by the oxygen diffusion-enhancing compound will enhance movement into tissues.

Computer simulations have shown that TSC specifically can increase the transport of oxygen through water by as much as 30 percent.
