= Pristane =

- Skeletal formula of pristane

Names
- IUPAC name 2,6,10,14-Tetramethylpentadecane

Identifiers
CAS Number	1921-70-6
3D model (JSmol)	Interactive image
Beilstein Reference	1720538
ChEBI	CHEBI:53181
ChemSpider	15182; 24531975 6R,10R; 21428537 6R,10S; 24531981 6S,10S
ECHA InfoCard	100.016.047
EC Number	217-650-8
MeSH	pristane
PubChem CID	15979
RTECS number	RZ1880000
UNII	26HZV48DT1
CompTox Dashboard (EPA)	DTXSID70870919
- InChI: InChI=1S/C19H40/c1-16(2)10-7-12-18(5)14-9-15-19(6)13-8-11-17(3)4/h16-19H,7-15H2,1-6H3 Key: XOJVVFBFDXDTEG-UHFFFAOYSA-N
- SMILES: CC(C)CCCC(C)CCCC(C)CCCC(C)C

Properties
Chemical formula	C_{19}H_{40}
Molar mass	268.529 g·mol^{−1}
Appearance	Colorless liquid
Odor	Odorless
Density	783 mg mL^{−1}
Melting point	−100.0 °C; −147.9 °F; 173.2 K
Boiling point	296 °C (565 °F; 569 K)
Refractive index (n_{D})	1.438

Thermochemistry
Heat capacity (C)	569.76 J K^{−1} mol^{−1}

Hazards
- GHS labelling
Pictograms	(GHS07: Exclamation mark)
Signal word	Warning
Hazard statements	H315
Flash point	>110 °C

Related compounds
Related alkanes	Isocetane; Phytane
- Except where otherwise noted, data are given for materials in their standard state (at 25 °C [77 °F], 100 kPa). verify (what is ?) Infobox references

Pristane is a natural saturated terpenoid alkane obtained primarily from shark liver oil, from which its name is derived (Latin pristis, "shark"). It is also found in the stomach oil of birds in the order Procellariiformes and in mineral oil and some foods. Pristane and phytane are used in the fields of geology and environmental science as biomarkers to characterize origins and evolution of petroleum hydrocarbons and coal.

It is a transparent oily liquid that is immiscible with water, but soluble in diethyl ether, benzene, chloroform and carbon tetrachloride.

Pristane is known to induce autoimmune diseases in rodents. It is used in research to understand the pathogenesis of rheumatoid arthritis and lupus.

It is used as a lubricant, a transformer oil, an immunologic adjuvant, and an anti-corrosion agent, biological marker, plasmocytomas inducer and in production of monoclonal antibodies.

Biosynthetically, pristane is derived from phytol and is used as a biomarker in petroleum studies. Tocopherols represent an alternate sedimentary source of pristane in sediments and petroleum.

Toxicity of pristane is alleviated by aconitine.
