= Phytane =

Alkane formed when phytol, a constituent of chlorophyll, loses its hydroxyl group

- Skeletal formula of phytane

Names
- IUPAC name 2,6,10,14-Tetramethylhexadecane

Identifiers
CAS Number	638-36-8
3D model (JSmol)	Interactive image
Beilstein Reference	1744639
ChEBI	CHEBI:48937
ChemSpider	12006; 393886 6S,10S,14R
ECHA InfoCard	100.010.303
EC Number	211-332-2
MeSH	phytane
PubChem CID	12523; 54081983 6R,10R; 42627075 6R,10S,14S; 446564 6S,10S,14R
UNII	27UZX1Q8TR
CompTox Dashboard (EPA)	DTXSID70862339
- InChI: InChI=1S/C20H42/c1-7-18(4)12-9-14-20(6)16-10-15-19(5)13-8-11-17(2)3/h17-20H,7-16H2,1-6H3 Key: GGYKPYDKXLHNTI-UHFFFAOYSA-N
- SMILES: CCC(C)CCCC(C)CCCC(C)CCCC(C)C

Properties
Chemical formula	C_{20}H_{42}
Molar mass	282.556 g·mol^{−1}
Appearance	Colourless liquid
Odor	Odourless
Density	791 mg mL^{−1} (at 20 °C)
Boiling point	301.41 °C (574.54 °F; 574.56 K) at 100 mPa

Related compounds
Related alkanes	Pristane; Squalane
- Except where otherwise noted, data are given for materials in their standard state (at 25 °C [77 °F], 100 kPa). verify (what is ?) Infobox references

Phytane is the isoprenoid alkane formed when phytol, a chemical substituent of chlorophyll, loses its hydroxyl group. When phytol loses one carbon atom, it yields pristane. Other sources of phytane and pristane have also been proposed than phytol.

Pristane and phytane are common constituents in petroleum and have been used as proxies for depositional redox conditions, as well as for correlating oil and its source rock (i.e. elucidating where oil formed). In environmental studies, pristane and phytane are target compounds for investigating oil spills.

== Chemistry ==
Phytane is a non-polar organic compound that is a clear and colorless liquid at room temperature. It is a head-to-tail linked regular isoprenoid with chemical formula C_{20}H_{42}.

Phytane has many structural isomers. Among them, crocetane is a tail-to-tail linked isoprenoid and often co-elutes with phytane during gas chromatography (GC) due to its structural similarity.

Phytane also has many stereoisomers because of its three stereo carbons, C-6, C-10 and C-14. Whereas pristane has two stereo carbons, C-6 and C-10. Direct measurement of these isomers has not been reported using gas chromatography.

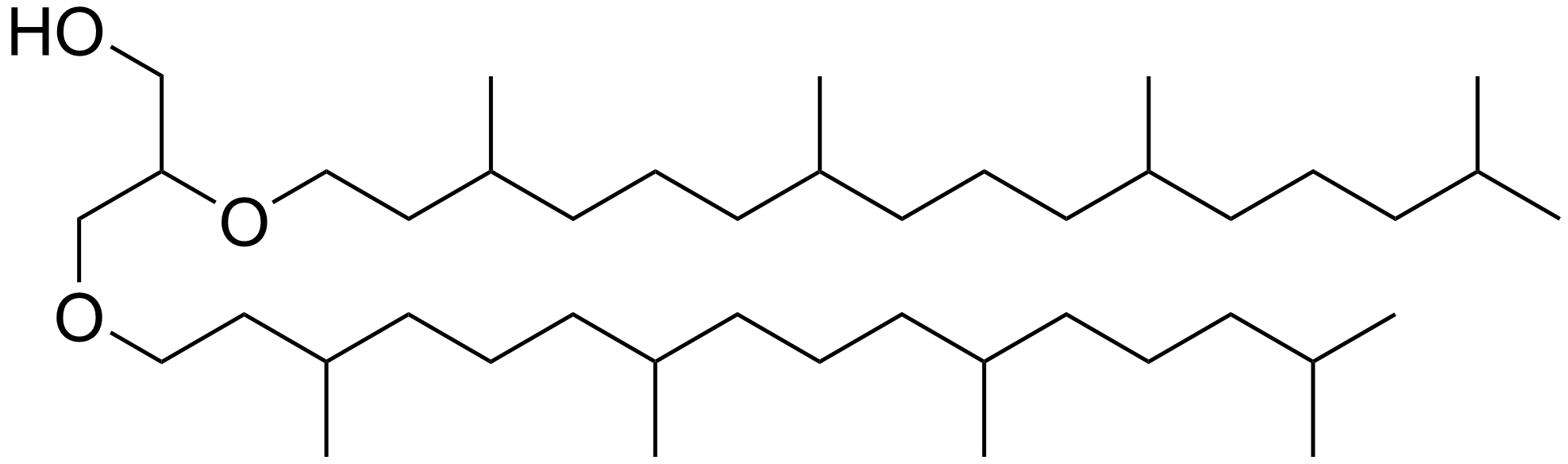
Chemical structure of an archaeol, with two phytanyl groups.

Chemical structure of α-tocopherol.

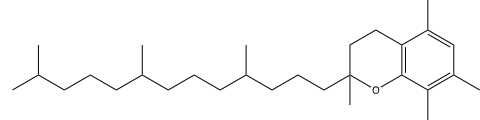
Chemical structure of trimethyl 2-methyl-2-(4,8,12-trimethyltridecyl)chroman, a type of MTTCs.

The substituent of phytane is phytanyl. Phytanyl groups are frequently found in archaeal membrane lipids of methanogenic and halophilic archaea (e.g., in archaeol). Phytene is the singly unsaturated version of phytane. Phytene is also found as the functional group phytyl in many organic molecules of biological importance such as chlorophyll, tocopherol (vitamin E), and phylloquinone (vitamin K_{1}). Phytene's corresponding alcohol is phytol. Geranylgeranene is the fully unsaturated form of phytane, and its corresponding substituent is geranylgeranyl.

== Sources ==
The major source of phytane and pristane is thought to be chlorophyll. Chlorophyll is one of the most important photosynthetic pigments in plants, algae, and cyanobacteria, and is the most abundant tetrapyrrole in the biosphere. Hydrolysis of chlorophyll a, b, d, and f during diagenesis in marine sediments, or during invertebrate feeding releases phytol, which is then converted to phytane or pristane.

Structure of chlorophyll a, with a side chain containing a phytyl group.

Another possible source of phytane and pristane is archaeal ether lipids. Laboratory studies show that thermal maturation of methanogenic archaea generates pristane and phytane from diphytanyl glyceryl ethers (archaeols).

In addition, pristane can be derived from tocopherols and methyltrimethyltridecylchromans (MTTCs).

== Preservation ==
In suitable environments, biomolecules like chlorophyll can be transformed and preserved in recognizable forms as biomarkers. Conversion during diagenesis often causes the chemical loss of functional groups like double bonds and hydroxyl groups.

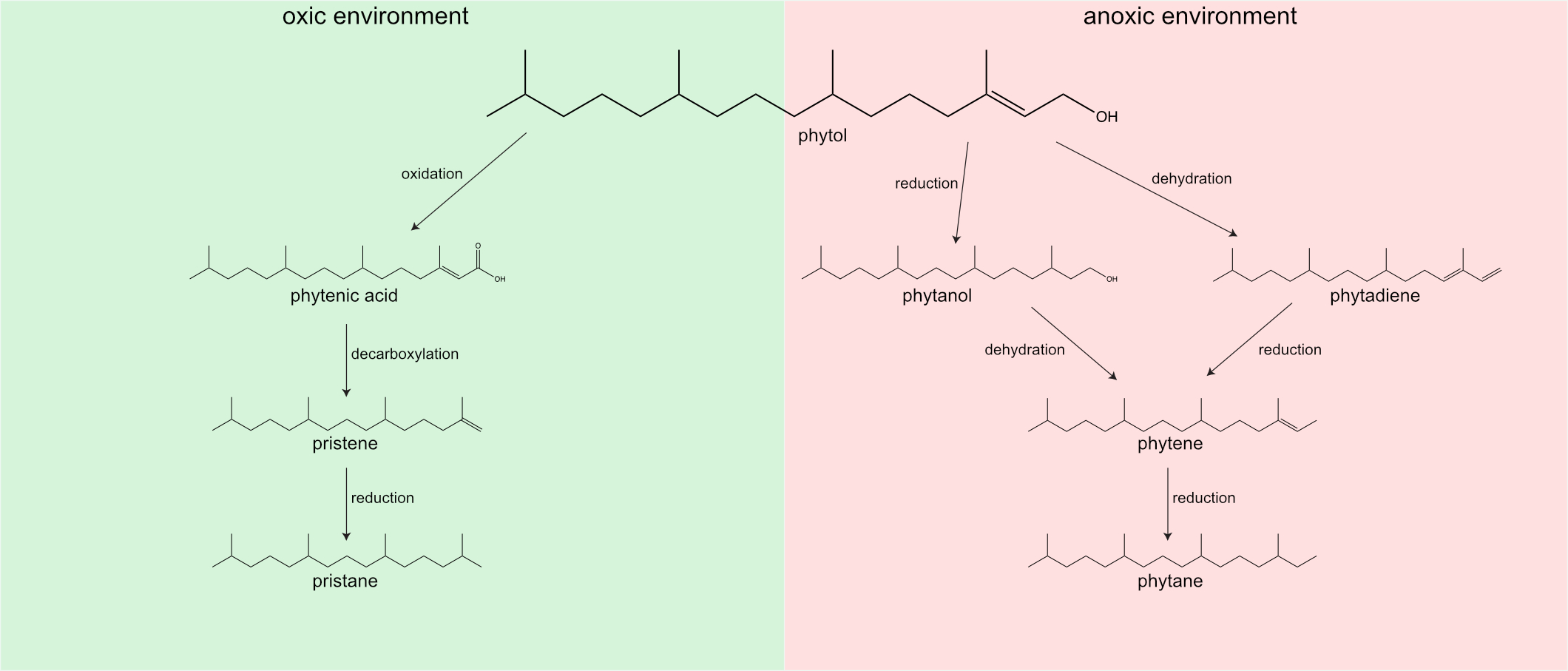
Pristane and phytane are formed by diagenesis of phytol under oxic and anoxic conditions, respectively.

Studies suggested that pristane and phytane are formed via diagenesis of phytol under different redox conditions. Pristane can be formed in oxic (oxidizing) conditions by phytol oxidation to phytenic acid, which may then undergo decarboxylation to pristene, before finally being reduced to pristane. In contrast, phytane is likely from reduction and dehydration of phytol (via dihydrophytol or phytene) under relatively anoxic conditions. However, various biotic and abiotic processes may control the diagenesis of chlorophyll and phytol, and the exact reactions are more complicated and not strictly-correlated to redox conditions.

In thermally immature sediments, pristane and phytane has a configuration dominated by 6R,10S stereochemistry (equivalent to 6S, 10R), which is inherited from C-7 and C-11 in phytol. During thermal maturation, isomerization at C-6 and C-10 leads to a mixture of 6R, 10S, 6S, 10S, and 6R, 10R.

== Geochemical parameters ==
=== Pristane/Phytane ratio ===
Pristane/phytane (Pr/Ph) is the ratio of abundances of pristane and phytane. It is a proxy for redox conditions in the depositional environments. The Pr/Ph index is based on the assumption that pristane is formed from phytol by an oxidative pathway, while phytane is generated through various reductive pathways. In non-biodegraded crude oil, Pr/Ph less than 0.8 indicates saline to hypersaline conditions associated with evaporite and carbonate deposition, whereas organic-lean terrigenous, fluvial,and deltaic sediments under oxic to suboxic conditions usually generate crude oil with Pr/Ph above 3. Pr/Ph is commonly applied because pristane and phytane are measured easily using gas chromatography.

However, the index should be used with caution, as pristane and phytane may not result from degradation of the same precursor (see *Source*). Also, pristane, but not phytane, can be produced in reducing environments by clay-catalysed degradation of phytol and subsequent reduction. Additionally, during catagenesis, Pr/Ph tends to increase. This variation may be due to preferential release of sulfur-bound phytols from source rocks during early maturation.

=== Pristane/nC_{17} and phytane/nC_{18} ratios ===
Pristane/n-heptadecane (Pr/nC_{17}) and phytane/n-octadecane (Ph/C_{18}) are sometimes used to correlate oil and its source rock (i.e. to elucidate where oil formed). Oils from rocks deposited under open-ocean conditions showed Pr/nC_{17}< 0.5, while those from inland peat swamp had ratios greater than 1.

The ratios should be used with caution for several reasons. Both Pr/nC_{17}and Ph/nC_{18} decrease with thermal maturity of petroleum because isoprenoids are less thermally stable than linear alkanes. In contrast, biodegradation increases these ratios because aerobic bacteria generally attack linear alkanes before the isoprenoids. Therefore, biodegraded oil is similar to low-maturity non-degraded oil in the sense of exhibiting low abundance of n-alkanes relative to pristane and phytane.

=== Biodegradation scale ===
Pristane and phytane are more resistant to biodegradation than n-alkanes, but less so than steranes and hopanes. The substantial depletion and complete elimination of pristane and phytane correspond to a Biomarker Biodegradation Scale of 3 and 4, respectively.

=== Compound specific isotope analyses ===
==== Carbon isotopes ====
The carbon isotopic composition of pristane and phytane generally reflects the kinetic isotope fractionation that occurs during photosynthesis. For example, δ^{13}C(PDB) of phytane in marine sediments and oils has been used to reconstruct ancient atmospheric CO_{2}levels, which affects the carbon isotopic fractionation associated with photosynthesis, over the past 500 million years. In this study, partial pressure of CO_{2} reached more than 1000 ppm at maxima compared to 410 ppm today.

Carbon isotope compositions of pristane and phytane in crude oil can also help to constrain their source. Pristane and phytane from a common precursor should have δ^{13}C values differing by no more than 0.3‰.

==== Hydrogen isotopes ====
Hydrogen isotope composition of phytol in marine phytoplankton and algae starts out as highly depleted, with δD (VSMOW) ranging from -360 to -280‰. Thermal maturation preferentially releases light isotopes, causing and pristane and phytane to become progressively heavier with maturation.

== Case study: limitation of Pr/Ph as a redox indicator ==
Inferences from Pr/Ph on the redox potential of source sediments should always be supported by other geochemical and geological data, such as sulfur content or the C_{35} homohopane index (i.e. the abundance of C_{35} homohopane relative to that of C_{31}-C_{35} homohopanes). For example, the Baghewala-1 oil from India has low Pr/Ph (0.9), high sulfur (1.2 wt.%) and high C35 homohopane index, which are consistent with anoxia during deposition of the source rock.

However, drawing conclusion on the oxic state of depositional environments only from Pr/Ph ratio can be misleading because salinity often controls the Pr/Ph in hypersaline environments. In another example, the decrease in Pr/Ph during deposition of the PermianKupferschiefer sequence in Germany is in coincidence with an increase in trimethylated 2-methyl-2-(4,8,12-trimethyltridecyl)chromans, an aromatic compound believed to be markers of salinity. Therefore, this decrease in Pr/Ph should indicate an increase in salinity, instead of an increase in anoxia.

== See also ==
- Phytol
- Pristane
- Biomarker
- Crocetane
- Archaeol
- Tocopherols
- Sterane
- Hopane
