= Crocetin =

Carotenoid chemical compound

- Skeletal formula of crocetin

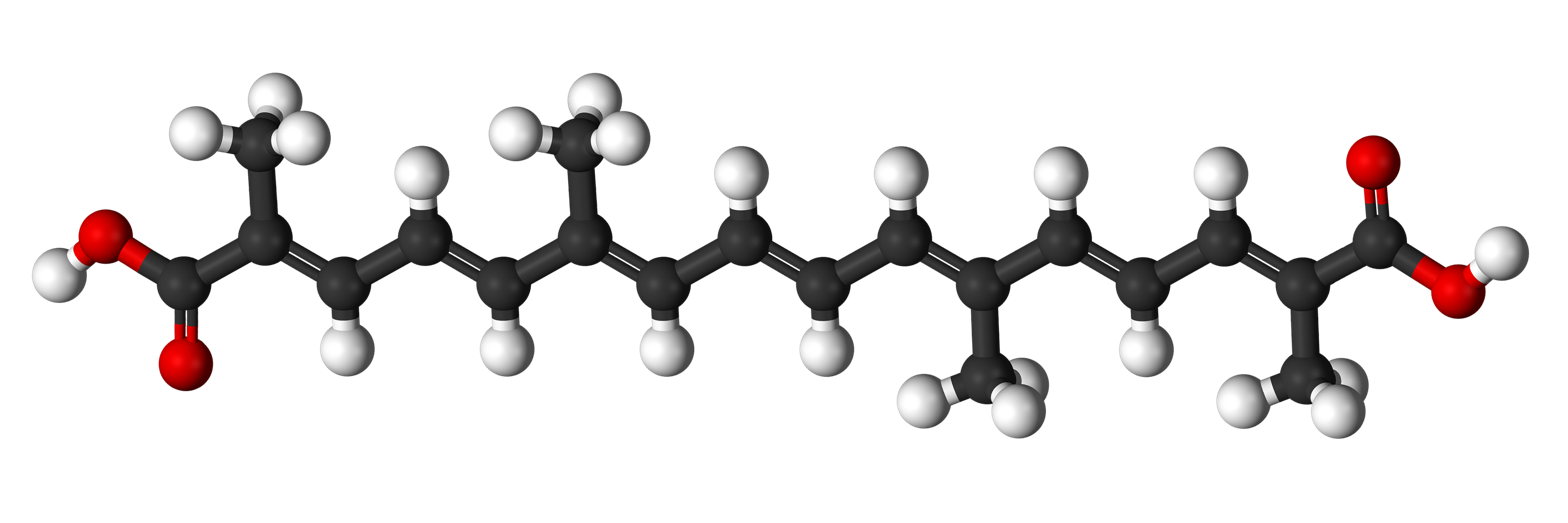
- Ball and stick model of crocetin

Names
- IUPAC name 8,8′-Diapocarotene-8,8′-dioic acid
- Systematic IUPAC name (2E,4E,6E,8E,10E,12E,14E)-2,6,11,15-Tetramethylhexadeca-2,4,6,8,10,12,14-heptaenedioic acid
- Other names 8,8'-Diapocarotenedioic acid; Transcrocetinate

Identifiers
CAS Number	27876-94-4; 591230-99-8 (sodium salt)
3D model (JSmol)	Interactive image
Beilstein Reference	1715455
ChEBI	CHEBI:3918
ChEMBL	ChEMBL464792
ChemSpider	4444644
ECHA InfoCard	100.044.265
EC Number	248-708-0
KEGG	C08588
MeSH	crocetin
PubChem CID	5281232
UNII	20TC155L9C; YP57637WMX (sodium salt)
CompTox Dashboard (EPA)	DTXSID201015585
- InChI: InChI=1S/C20H24O4/c1-15(11-7-13-17(3)19(21)22)9-5-6-10-16(2)12-8-14-18(4)20(23)24/h5-14H,1-4H3,(H,21,22)(H,23,24)/b6-5+,11-7+,12-8+,15-9+,16-10+,17-13+,18-14+ Key: PANKHBYNKQNAHN-MQQNZMFNSA-N; InChI=1/C20H24O4/c1-15(11-7-13-17(3)19(21)22)9-5-6-10-16(2)12-8-14-18(4)20(23)24/h5-14H,1-4H3,(H,21,22)(H,23,24)/b6-5+,11-7+,12-8+,15-9+,16-10+,17-13+,18-14+ Key: PANKHBYNKQNAHN-MQQNZMFNBY
- SMILES: CC(C=CC=C(C)C(O)=O)=CC=CC=C(C)C=CC=C(C)C(O)=O

Properties
Chemical formula	C_{20}H_{24}O_{4}
Molar mass	328.408 g·mol^{−1}
Appearance	Red crystals
Melting point	285 °C (545 °F; 558 K)
log P	4.312
Acidity (pK_{a})	4.39
- Except where otherwise noted, data are given for materials in their standard state (at 25 °C [77 °F], 100 kPa). verify (what is ?) Infobox references

Crocetin is a natural apocarotenoid dicarboxylic acid, a diterpenoid, and a branched-chain dicarboxylic acid. It was the first plant carotenoid to be recognized as early as 1818. The major ingredient of saffron is the yellow pigment crocin 2 (three other derivatives with different glycosylations are known) containing a gentiobiose (disaccharide) group at each end of the molecule.

It is found in the crocus flower together with its glycoside, crocin, and Gardenia jasminoides fruits. The chemical structure of crocetin forms the central core of crocin, the compound responsible for the color of saffron. Crocetin is usually extracted commercially from gardenia fruit, due to the high cost of saffron. It is also known as crocetic acid. It forms brick red crystals with a melting point of 285 °C.

A simple and specific HPLC-UV method has been developed to quantify ingredients of saffron, namely the four crocins and crocetin.

== Transcrocetinate sodium ==
The sodium salt of crocetin, transcrocetinate sodium (INN, also known as trans sodium crocetinate or TSC), belongs to a group of substances known as bipolar trans carotenoid salts, which constitute a subclass of oxygen diffusion-enhancing compounds. Transcrocetinate sodium was one of the first such compounds discovered.

Transcrocetinate sodium

Transcrocetinate sodium can be prepared by reacting saffron with sodium hydroxide and extracting the salt of the trans crocetin isomer from the solution.

== Mechanism of action ==
The mechanism of action for TSC is under preliminary research for its potential to reduce the production of reactive ROS. Similar to other oxygen diffusion-enhancing compounds, transcrocetinate sodium appears to improve oxygenation in hypoxic tissues by exerting hydrophobic effects on water molecules in blood plasma, thereby increasing the hydrogen bonding between water molecules. This in turn causes the overall organization of water molecules in plasma to become more structured, which facilitates the diffusion of oxygen through plasma, possibly promoting the movement of oxygen into tissues.

== See also ==
- Crocetane
