= Discrimination against LGBTQ people =

Discrimination against LGBTQ people encompasses the prejudice and negative behaviors targeting the people of the LGBTQ community and specific subgroups: lesbians, gay men, bisexuals, transgender people, queer people, among other sexual and gender minorities.

== Homophobia ==
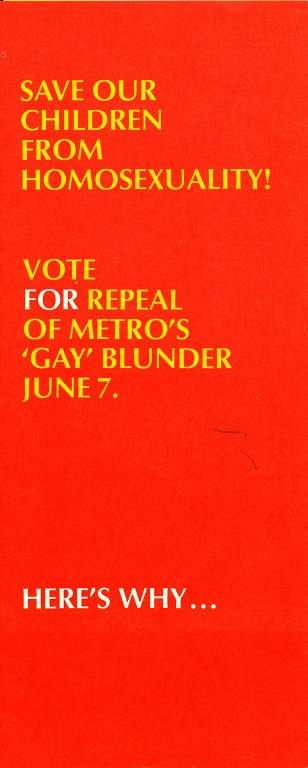
Brochure used by Save Our Children, a political coalition formed in 1977 in Miami, Florida, U.S., to overturn a recently legislated county ordinance that banned discrimination in areas of housing, employment, and public accommodation based on sexual orientation

Homophobia encompasses a range of negative attitudes and feelings toward homosexuality or people who identify or are perceived as being lesbian, gay or bisexual. It has been defined as contempt, prejudice, aversion, hatred, or antipathy, may be based on irrational fear, and may sometimes be attributed to religious beliefs. Homophobia is observable in critical and hostile behavior such as discrimination and violence on the basis of sexual orientations that are non-heterosexual.

Recognized types of homophobia include institutionalized homophobia, e.g. religious homophobia and state-sponsored homophobia, and internalized homophobia, experienced by people who have same-sex attractions, regardless of how they identify. According to 2010 Hate Crimes Statistics released by the FBI National Press Office, 19.3 percent of hate crimes across the United States "were motivated by a sexual orientation bias." Moreover, a Southern Poverty Law Center 2010 Intelligence Report extrapolating data from FBI national hate crime statistics from 1995 to 2008, found that LGBTQ people were "far more likely than any other minority group in the United States to be victimized by violent hate crime."

=== Lesbians ===
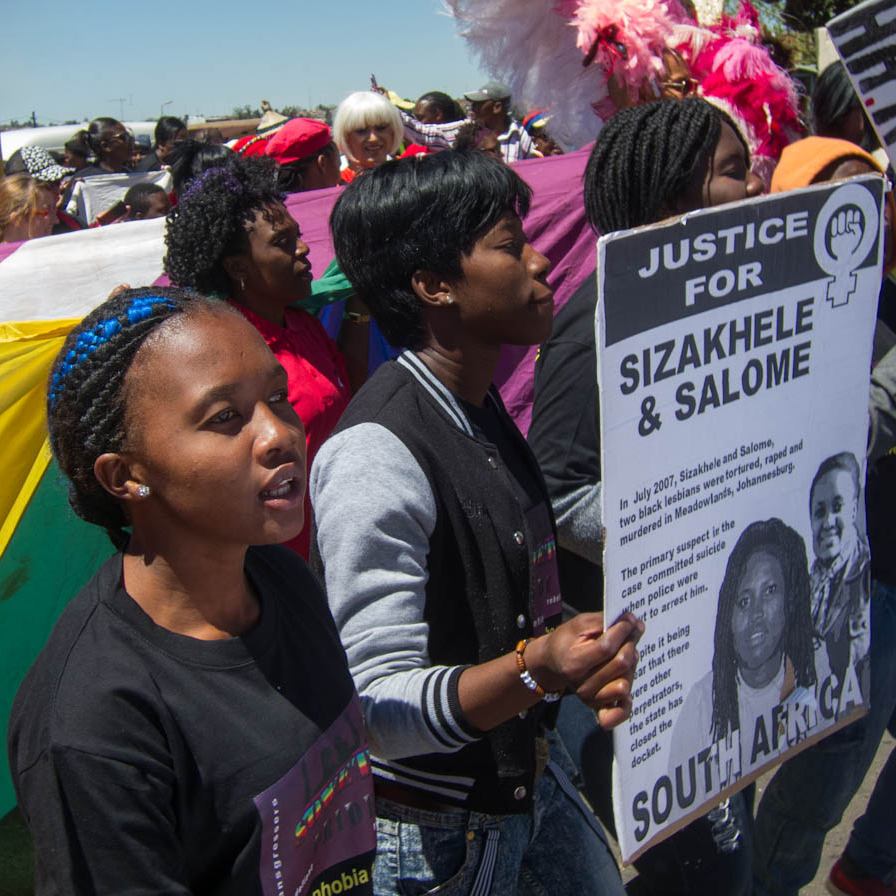
Soweto Pride 2012 participants remember lesbians raped and murdered in 2007.

Discrimination against lesbians, sometimes referred as lesbophobia or lesphobia, is a form of homophobia, often paired with misogyny, that comprises various forms of prejudice and negativity towards lesbians as individuals, as couples, as a group, or lesbianism in general.

Examples of discrimination against lesbians include, but are not limited to, discrimination in housing and employment, physical or sexual abuse, including corrective rape, lack of legal protections for lesbian couples to care for one another, removal of children from lesbian mothers, negative stereotypes and negative media representation, verbal harassment, legal persecution and imprisonment, government censorship, and familial and/or community rejection.

Lesbophobia is analogous to gayphobia, which is discrimination against male homosexuals.

=== Gay men ===
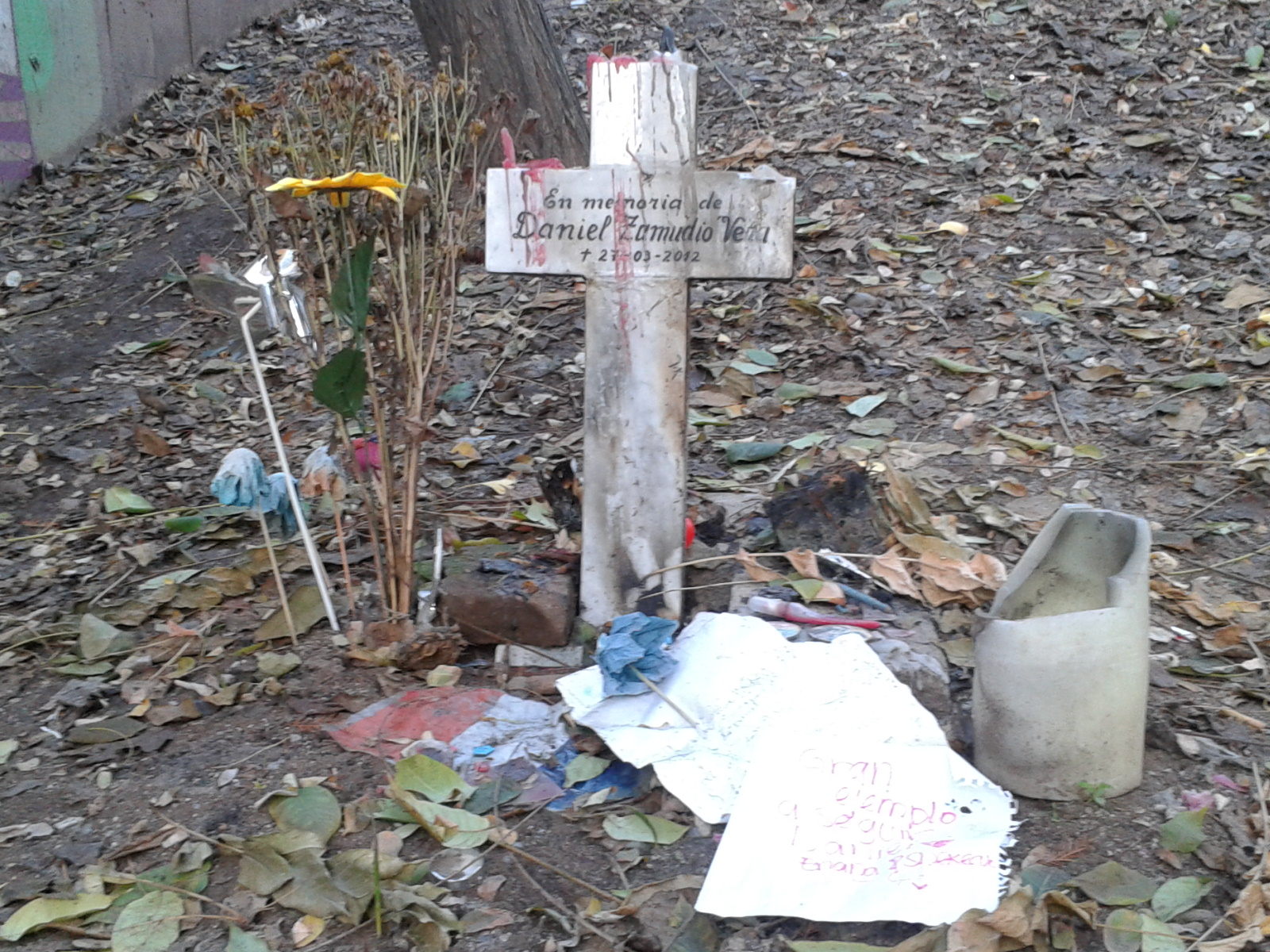
Grave for Daniel Zamudio, a 24-year old Chilean man who was beaten and tortured for several hours in downtown Santiago by four perpetrators, who attacked him after learning he was gay

Discrimination against gay men, sometimes called gayphobia, is a form of homophobic prejudice, hatred, or bias specifically directed toward gay men, male homosexuality, or men who are perceived to be gay. This discrimination is closely related to femmephobia, which is the dislike of, or hostility toward, individuals who present as feminine, including gay and effeminate men.

Discrimination against gay men can result from religion, prejudicial reactions to one's feminine mannerisms, styles of clothing, and even vocal register. Within the LGBTQ-community, internalized issues around meeting social expectations of masculinity have been found among gay, bisexual, and transgender men. It is analogous to lesbophobia.

=== Bisexuals ===
Like people of other LGBTQ sexualities, bisexuals often face discrimination. In addition to the discrimination associated with homophobia, bisexuals frequently contend with discrimination from gay men, lesbians, and straight society around the word bisexual and bisexual identity itself. The belief that everyone is bisexual (especially women as opposed to men), or that bisexuality does not exist as a unique identity, is common. This stems from two views: In the heterosexist view, people are presumed to be sexually attracted to the opposite sex, and it is sometimes reasoned that a bisexual person is simply a heterosexual person who is sexually experimenting. In the monosexist view, it is believed that people cannot be bisexual unless they are equally sexually attracted to both sexes, regulating sexual orientation to being about the sex or gender one prefers. In this view, people are either exclusively homosexual (gay/lesbian) or exclusively heterosexual (straight), closeted homosexual people who wish to appear heterosexual, or heterosexuals who are experimenting with their sexuality. Assertions that one cannot be bisexual unless equally sexually attracted to both sexes, however, are disputed by various researchers, who have reported bisexuality to fall on a continuum, like sexuality in general.

Male bisexuality is particularly presumed to be non-existent, with sexual fluidity studies adding to the debate. In 2005, researchers Gerulf Rieger, Meredith L. Chivers, and J. Michael Bailey used penile plethysmography to measure the arousal of self-identified bisexual men to pornography involving only men and pornography involving only women. Participants were recruited via advertisements in gay-oriented magazines and an alternative paper. They found that the self-identified bisexual men in their sample had genital arousal patterns similar to either homosexual or heterosexual men. The authors concluded that "in terms of behavior and identity, bisexual men clearly exist", but that male bisexuality had not been shown to exist with respect to arousal or attraction. Some researchers hold that the technique used in the study to measure genital arousal is too crude to capture the richness (erotic sensations, affection, admiration) that constitutes sexual attraction. The National Gay and Lesbian Task Force called the study and The New York Times coverage of it flawed and biphobic.

The American Institute of Bisexuality stated that Bailey's study was misinterpreted and misreported by both The New York Times and its critics. In 2011, Bailey and other researchers reported that among men with a history of several romantic and sexual relationships with members of both sexes, high levels of sexual arousal were found in response to both male and female sexual imagery. The subjects were recruited from a Craigslist group for men seeking intimacy with both members of a heterosexual couple. The authors said that this change in recruitment strategy was an important difference, but it may not have been a representative sample of bisexual-identified men. They concluded that "bisexual-identified men with bisexual arousal patterns do indeed exist", but could not establish whether such a pattern is typical of bisexual-identified men in general.

Bisexual erasure (or bisexual invisibility) is the tendency to ignore, remove, falsify, or reexplain evidence of bisexuality in culture, history, academia, news media and other primary sources. In its most extreme form, bisexual erasure includes denying that bisexuality exists. It is often a manifestation of biphobia, although it does not necessarily involve overt antagonism.

There is increasing inclusion and visibility of bisexuals, particularly in the LGBTQ community. American psychologist Beth Firestone writes that since she wrote her first book on bisexuality, in 1996, "bisexuality has gained visibility, although progress is uneven and awareness of bisexuality is still minimal or absent in many of the more remote regions of our country and internationally."

== Transphobia ==
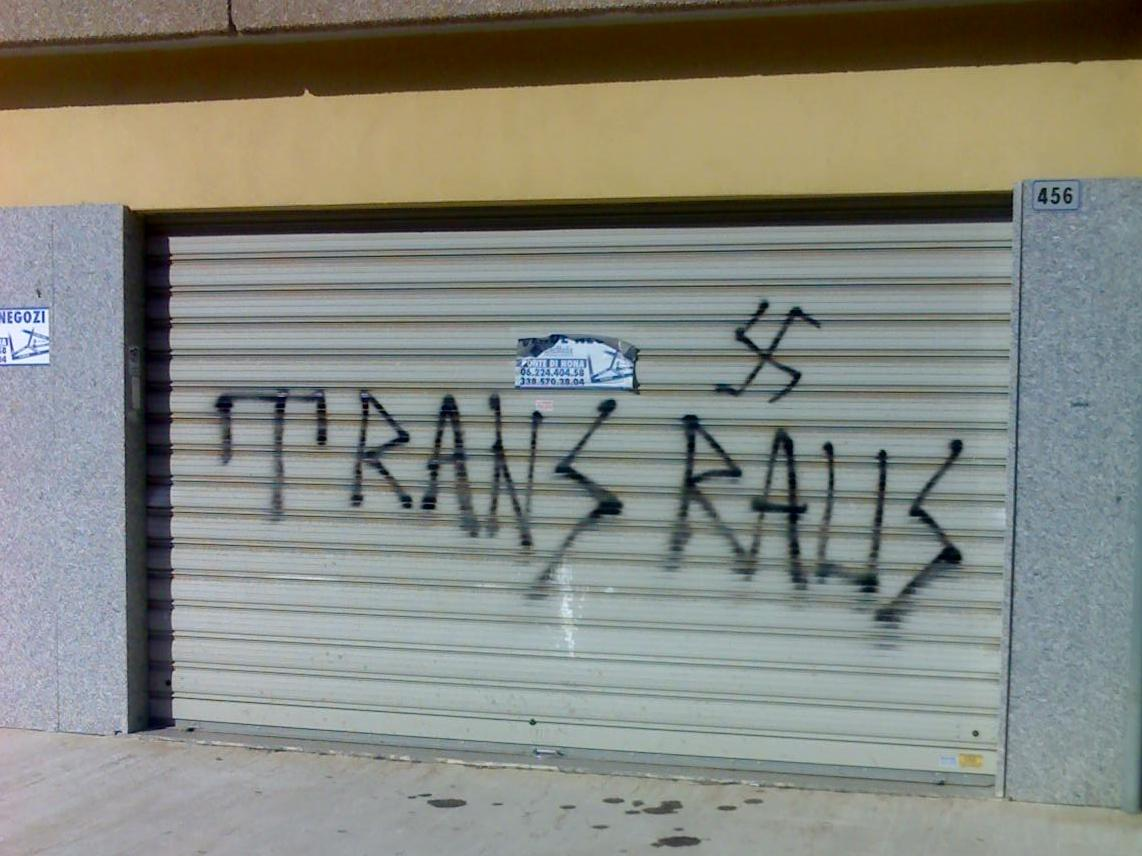
Transphobic graffiti in Rome, Italy, consisting of the text "trans out" in German, and a swastika.

Transphobia consists of negative attitudes, feelings, or actions towards transgender or transsexual people, or transness in general. Transphobia can include fear, aversion, hatred, violence or anger towards people who do not conform to social gender roles. Transphobia is a type of prejudice and discrimination, similar to racism, sexism, or ableism, and it is closely associated with homophobia. People of color who are transgender experience discrimination above and beyond that which can be explained as a simple combination of transphobia and racism.

Transgender youth often experience a combination of abuse from family members, sexual harassment, and bullying or school violence. They are also disproportionately placed in foster care and welfare programs compared to their peers. Adult transgender people regularly encounter sexual violence, police violence, public ridicule, misgendering, or other forms of violence and harassment in their daily lives. These issues cause many trans people to feel unsafe in public. Other issues include healthcare discrimination, workplace discrimination or feeling under siege by conservative political or religious groups who oppose LGBT-rights laws. Discrimination and violence sometimes originates from people within the LGBT community or feminist movements.

As well as increased risk of violence and other threats, the stress created by transphobia causes negative mental health outcomes and leads to drug use disorders, running away from home (in minors), and suicide.

In much of the Western world, there has been a gradual establishment of policies combatting discrimination and supporting equal opportunity in all aspects of life since the 1990s. The trend is also taking shape in some developing nations. In addition, campaigns regarding the LGBT community are being spread around the world to improve social acceptance of nontraditional gender identities. The "Stop the Stigma" campaign by the UN is one such example. However, transphobic violence has been on the rise since 2021, accompanied with an increase in anti-trans discriminatory laws being enacted in many countries.

=== Transgender men ===
Worldwide, transgender men and transmasculine people face prejudice and stigmatization that affect their everyday lives. (Note: While the issues discussed here affect both transgender men and other transmasculine individuals, the article generally refers to only transgender men for the sake of brevity.) This discrimination comes in many forms and especially affects those who are not typically perceived as cisgender men. (Note: The word "cisgender" refers to those who are not transgender.) Generally, there is less research into trans men's experiences than those of cisgender LGB people or trans women, which can make it difficult to find data on the discrimination they face. Experiences of trans men in low- and middle-income countries are also understudied compared to those of trans men in high-income countries.

Transgender men experience discrimination in a wide variety of settings. In the public sphere, this includes employment, housing, and medical discrimination. Trans men are especially vulnerable when attempting to access reproductive healthcare. Trans boys often experience bullying and harassment in the school setting. In the private sphere, trans men experience high rates of intimate partner violence, rape, violent crime, and physical assault. Trans men who have not gotten hysterectomies are also uniquely vulnerable to reproductive coercion, especially in the context of domestic violence and corrective rape.

Discrimination against transgender men and transmasculine individuals is sometimes referred to as anti-transmasculinity, transandrophobia, or transmisandry.

=== Transgender women ===
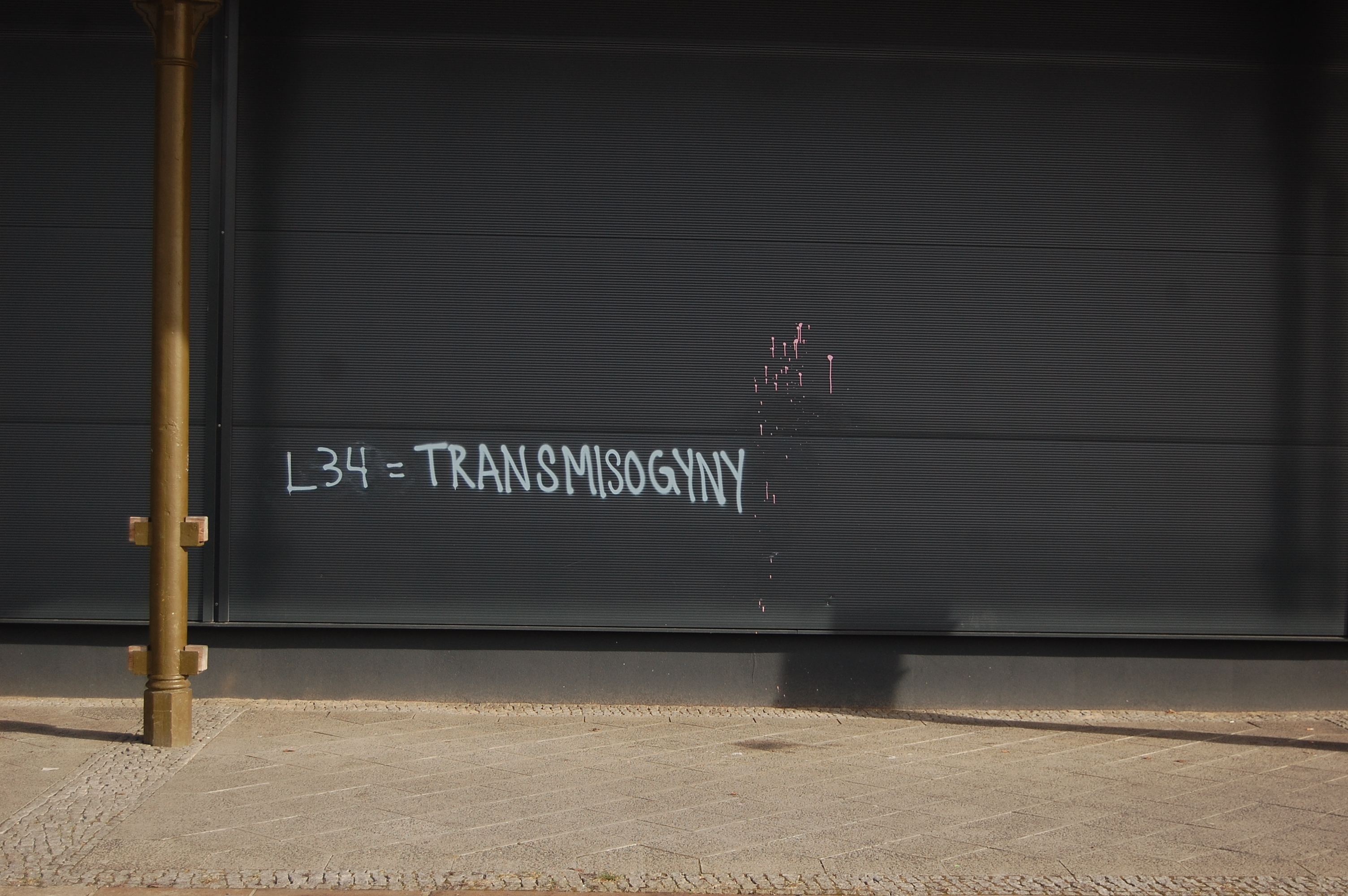
Graffiti in Berlin branding the Liebig 34 squatters as transmisogynists

Transmisogyny, otherwise known as trans-misogyny and transphobic misogyny, is the intersection of transphobia and misogyny as experienced by trans women and transfeminine people. The term was coined by Julia Serano in her 2007 book Whipping Girl to describe a particular form of oppression experienced by trans women. In a 2017 interview with The New York Times, Serano explores the roots of transmisogyny as a critique of feminine gender expressions which are "ridiculed in comparison to masculine interests and gender expression."

Transmisogyny is a central concept in transfeminism and is commonly referenced in intersectional feminist theory. In her definition of transmisogyny, Serano includes not only transgender people among those affected by transmisogyny, but also some cisgender people, such as those who identify as drag queens.

== Resilience ==
Meyer argues that resilience should be treated as an integral part of the minority-stress process affecting sexual and gender minority health. He distinguishes individual resilience—personal traits and coping resources—from community resilience—resources available through social networks and communities, including community belonging, shared identity, positive role models, and institutional support. Because minority stress originates in social stigma and prejudice, resilience should be examined at both individual and community levels, although research on resilience among LGBTQ populations remains underdeveloped. A longitudinal study of 3,627 LGBTQ+ adults sampled across five waves between 2017 and 2025 documented one such collective response, which the authors termed identity vigilance: as perceptions of the possibility of progressive social change declined, group identification, group-based self-definition and satisfaction, collective efficacy, and the desire to preserve identity-related spaces and symbols all increased significantly, and stronger identification buffered respondents against the negative emotional consequences of perceived social decline. Other scholars have urged caution about resilience as an analytic frame, arguing that it can place the burden of navigating oppression on individuals while leaving the institutions that produce discrimination unchallenged.

== Discussion ==
LGBTQ individuals have faced a long history of discrimination. They've been labeled as mentally ill, faced forced attempts to change who they are, and experienced hate crimes and exclusion from jobs, homes, and public places.

Survey studies show that instances of personal discrimination are common among LGBTQ community. This includes things like slurring, sexual harassment, and violence. According to a survey conducted for National Public Radio, at least one in five LGBTQ Americans have experienced discrimination in public because of their identity. This includes in housing, education, employment, and law enforcement. Furthermore, the report reveals that people of color in the LGBTQ community are twice more likely than white people in the LGBTQ community to experience discrimination, specifically in job applications and interactions with police. One-third of LGBTQ Americans believe that the bigger problem is based on laws, and government policies, and the rest believe that it is based on individual prejudice. Due to the experiences of discrimination in public, many LGBTQ Americans tries to avoid situations or places out of fear of discrimination, such as bathrooms, medical care, or calling the police.

A survey by CAP shows that 25.2% of LGBTQ people experienced discrimination based on their sexual orientation or gender identity, and that these discriminations negatively affect their well-being and living environment. Due to the fear of discrimination, many LGBTQ people change their lives such as hiding their relationships, delaying health care, avoid social situations, etc. In research publish by UCLA School of Law, survey data showed that 29.8% of LGBTQ employees experienced workplace discrimination such as being fired or not hired. LGBTQ employees who are people of color were much more likely to report that they didn't get hired because of their sexual orientation or gender identity, compared to white LGBTQ employees. Transgender employees were more likely to face discrimination based on their LGBTQ identity compared to cisgender LGBTQ employees. Almost half (48.8%) of transgender employees experienced discrimination due to their LGBTQ identity, while only 27.8% of cisgender LGBTQ employees reported such experiences. In addition, over half (57.0%) of discriminated LGBTQ employees said their employer or co-workers indicated that the unfair treatment was linked to religious beliefs. In the U.S., certain states have passed laws permitting child welfare agencies to deny services to LGBTQ community based on religious or moral beliefs. Similarly, some states allow healthcare providers to refuse certain procedures or medications for LGBTQ community on religious or moral grounds. Additionally, certain states permit businesses to decline services to LGBTQ people or same-sex couples, particularly in the context of wedding-related services, citing religious or moral beliefs.

In a 2001 study that examined possible root causes of mental disorders in lesbian, gay and bisexual people, Cochran and psychologist Vickie M. Mays, of the University of California, explored whether ongoing discrimination fuels anxiety, depression and other stress-related mental health problems among cisgender LGBTQ people. The authors found strong evidence of a relationship between the two. The team compared how 74 cisgender LGBTQ and 2,844 heterosexual respondents rated lifetime and daily experiences with discrimination such as not being hired for a job or being denied a bank loan, as well as feelings of perceived discrimination. Cisgender LGBTQ respondents reported higher rates of perceived discrimination than heterosexuals in every category related to discrimination, the team found. However, while gay youth are considered to be at higher risk for suicide, a literature review published in the journal Adolescence states, "Being gay in-and-of-itself is not the cause of the increase in suicide." Rather the review notes that the findings of previous studies suggested the,"...suicide attempts were significantly associated with psychosocial stressors, including gender nonconformity, early awareness of being gay, victimization, lack of support, school dropout, family problems, acquaintances' suicide attempts, homelessness, substance abuse, and other psychiatric disorders. Some of these stressors are also experienced by heterosexual adolescents, but they have been shown to be more prevalent among gay adolescents." Despite recent progress in LGBTQ rights, gay men continue to experience high rates of loneliness and depression after coming out.

== Other sexual and gender minorities ==
- Discrimination against aromantic people
- Discrimination against asexual people
- Discrimination against intersex people
- Discrimination against non-binary people

== Related concepts ==
- Gay bashing
- Heterosexism
- Heteronormativity
- LGBTQ employment discrimination in the United States
- LGBTQ stereotypes
- Trans bashing
- Transmisandry
- Transmisogyny
- Transgender inequality

== See also ==
- Anti-LGBTQ rhetoric
- Capital punishment for homosexuality
- Criminalization of homosexuality
- Homophobic propaganda
- LGBTQ bullying
- LGBTQ rights opposition
- Persecution of transgender people under the second Trump administration
- Violence against LGBTQ people
