= Discrimination against gay men =

Prejudice, hatred, or bias toward gay men, male homosexuality, or men perceived to be gay

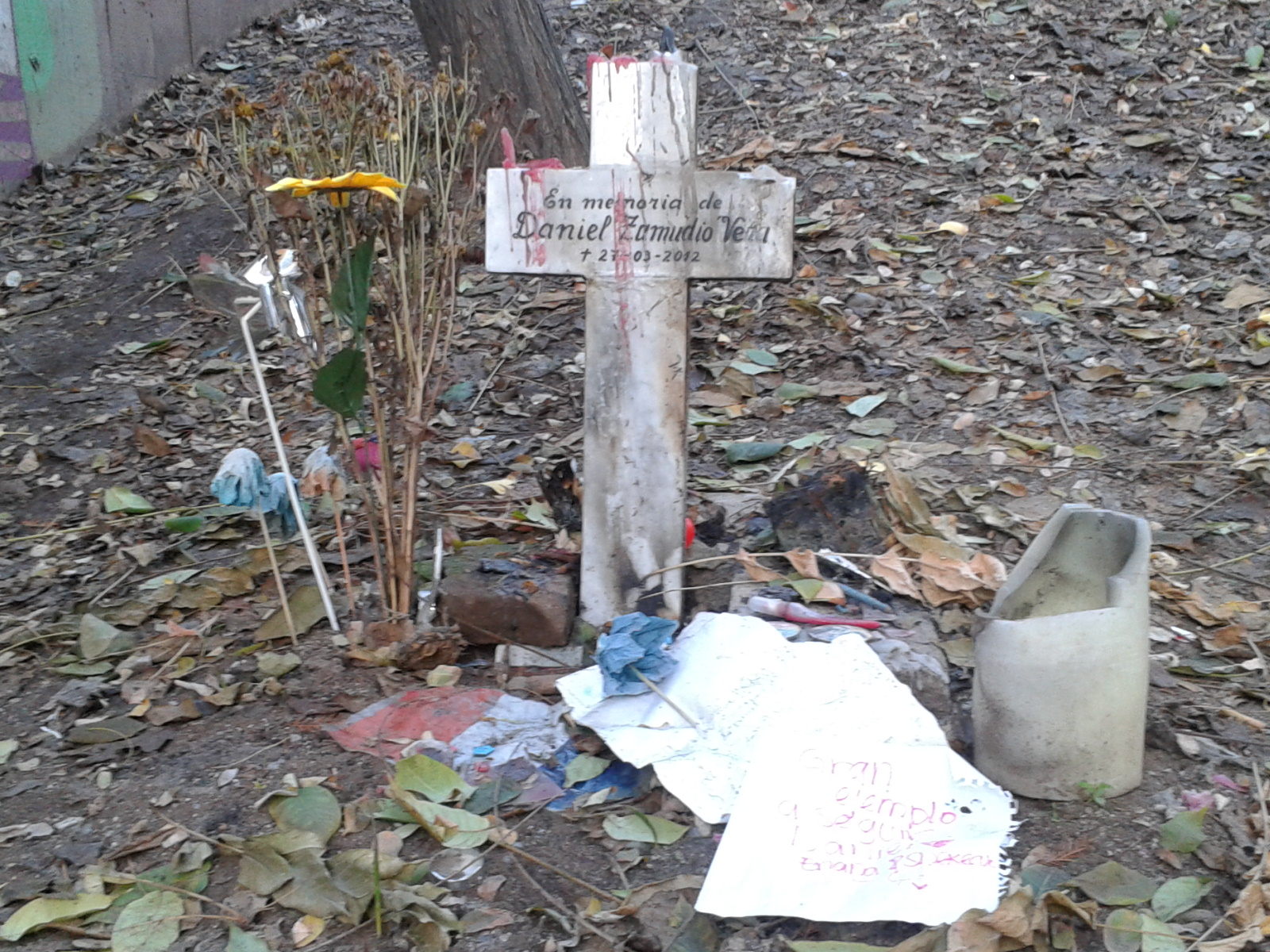
Grave for Daniel Zamudio, a 24-year old Chilean man who was beaten and tortured for several hours in downtown Santiago by four perpetrators, who attacked him after learning he was gay

Discrimination against gay men, sometimes called gayphobia, is a form of homophobic prejudice, hatred, or bias specifically directed toward gay men, male homosexuality, or men who are perceived to be gay. This discrimination is closely related to femmephobia, which is the dislike of, or hostility toward, individuals who present as feminine, including gay and effeminate men.

Discrimination against gay men can result from religion, prejudicial reactions to one's feminine mannerisms, styles of clothing, and even vocal register. Within the LGBTQ-community, internalized issues around meeting social expectations of masculinity have been found among gay, bisexual, and transgender men. It is analogous to lesbophobia.

== Discrimination in society ==
According to the French government, discrimination against gay men "is a form of homophobia that specifically affects men. Although it is primarily aimed at gay and bisexual men, it can also affect heterosexual men who are perceived as homosexual. Gay men may be targets of physical aggression or devalued by stereotypes linked to feminisation and hypersexualisation."

The journalist Pierre Bouvier described anti-gay male sentiment as parallel to lesbophobia. Noting how these two different forms of homophobia operate in Western cultures, he wrote,

There is very clearly a difference in mechanisms between gayphobia and lesbophobia, and this translates into different types of aggression. Where the collective imagination over-sexualizes gay men and exerts strong verbal and physical violence against boys and men who are not considered sufficiently masculine or heterosexual; for women, on the other hand, the assertion of their lesbian identity will be further disqualified, minimized, reduced to a fad, or even sexualized as a prelude to heterosexuality.

In 2002, there were at least 30 countries where female homosexuality was not explicitly criminalized, but male homosexuality was illegal. Compared to lesbians, gay men are more often victims of hate crimes and have more difficulty adopting children.

== Queer theory ==
In French academia, queer theorists have examined the unique ways in which patriarchy attempts to enforce both masculinity and heterosexuality on those with male bodies. The French queer and race theorist Louis-Georges Tin examined discrimination against gay men, and the historical development of the various forms of LGBT-related phobias under the umbrella of homophobia. He writes:

There has been an inverse movement of lexical differentiation operating at the heart of the concept of homophobia. Because of the specificity of attitudes towards lesbianism, the term lesbophobia has been introduced into theoretic discourses, a term which brings to light particular mechanisms that the generic concept of homophobia tends to overshadow. With one stroke, this distinction justifies the term gayphobia, since much homophobic discourse, in reality, pertains only to male homosexuality. Similarly, the concept of biphobia has also been proposed in order to highlight the singular situation of bisexuals, often stigmatized by both heterosexual and homosexual communities. Moreover, we need to take into consideration the very different issues linked to transsexual, transvestite, and transgender persons, which brings to mind the notion of transphobia.

In her 2017 text, The Women's Liberation Movement: Impacts and Outcomes, the German gender historian Kristina Schulz noted that within the Western media landscape during the 1970s' Gay Rights Movement, prejudice against gay men attracted more media attention than lesbophobia, largely due to the rhetoric of reactionary conservatives such as Anita Bryant, who suggested that gay men were sexual predators.

== Academic studies ==
In peer-reviewed studies which break down and distinguish homophobia separately between discrimination against gay men and lesbians, researchers have found statistically significant differences between heterosexual men and women in regards to their attitudes toward gay men. While no statistically significant differences were found in men and women in regard to lesbians, heterosexual men do demonstrate statistically significant elevated levels of animosity toward men they perceive as gay.

=== Linguistics ===
Scholars have noted most homophobic slurs are specifically directed against gay men. Paul Baker of Lancaster University writes, "Many gay men have been subjected to bouts of name-calling, possibly from a time before they even realized what homosexuality was. The over-lexicalisation of pejorative terms for 'gay man' which exist (for example: faggot, pansy, puff, shirt-lifter, brown-hatter, fairy, batty-boy, queer, etc.) is further testament to their status as 'target.'"

Daniel Green (Vienna University of Economics and Business) has analyzed the Austrian Supreme Court's (OGH) application of the concept of "same-sex fornication" in appeal cases between 1978 and 2014, uncovering systemic discrimination that primarily disadvantages gay men. His corpus-assisted study reveals how the OGH's language conflates consensual same-sex relations with serious offenses like sexual coercion, perpetuating hetero-androcentric biases and marginalizing sexual minorities under the guise of "protection" and "prevention." These practices reflect institutionalized homophobia, with rulings reinforcing societal inequalities.

== See also ==
- Compulsory heterosexuality
- Discrimination against men
- Effeminacy
- Gaybashing
- Gay panic defense
- Heterosexism
- Societal attitudes toward homosexuality
- Sodomy laws
- Transgender genocide
- Category:Violence against gay men
- Violence against LGBT people
- Violence against transgender people
