= Misogyny =

Prejudice against, or hatred of, women

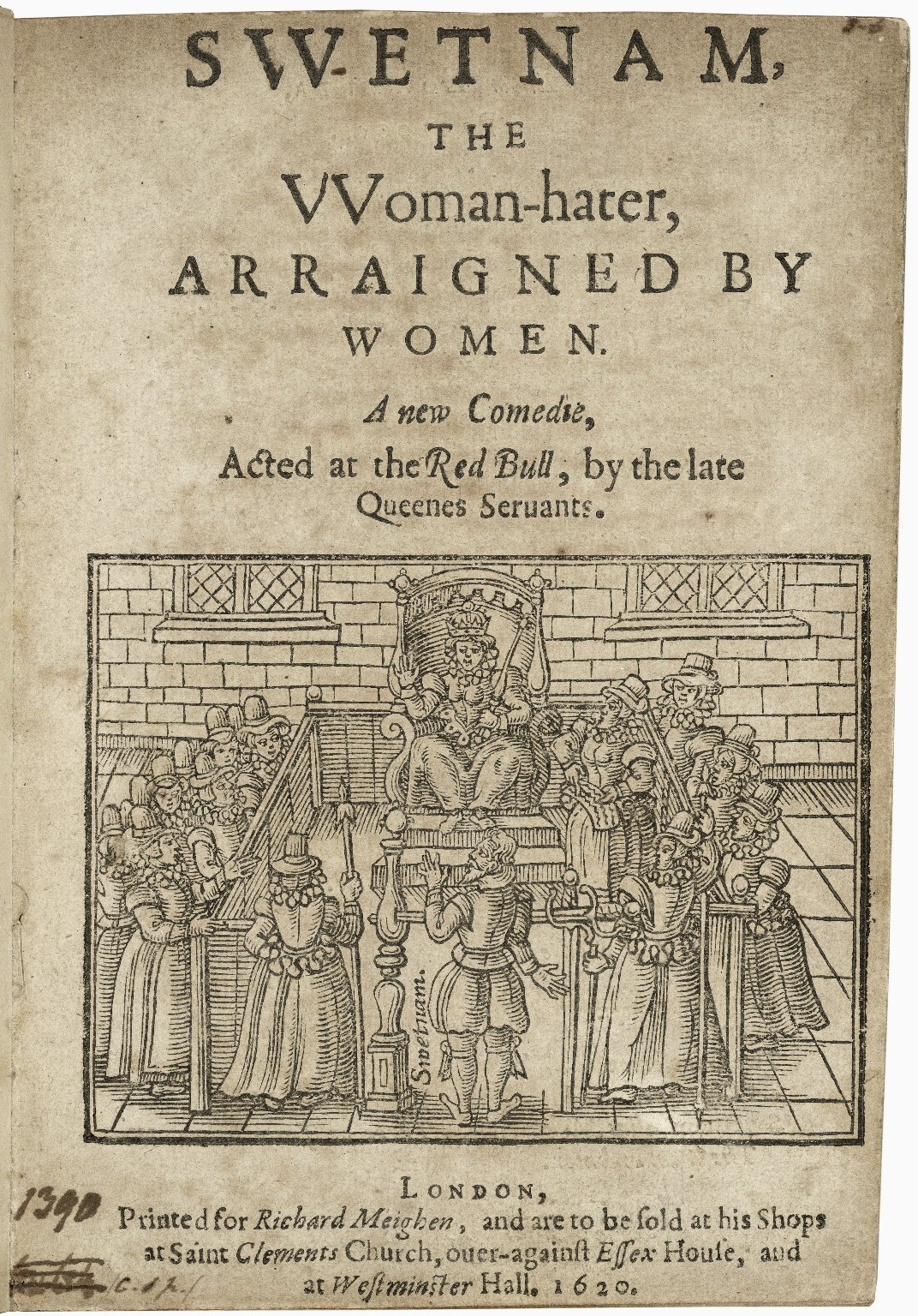
Swetnam the Woman-Hater, printed in 1620. The work is credited with originating the English term misogynist.

Misogyny (/mɪˈsɒdʒɪni/) is hatred of, contempt for, or prejudice against women or girls. It is a form of sexism that can keep women at a lower social status than men, thus maintaining the social roles of patriarchy. Misogyny has been widely practised for thousands of years. It is reflected in art, literature, human societal structure, historical events, mythology, philosophy, and religion worldwide.

An example of misogyny is violence against women, which includes domestic violence and, in its most extreme forms, misogynist terrorism and femicide. Misogyny also often operates through sexual harassment, coercion, and psychological techniques aimed at controlling women, and by legal or social exclusion of women from full citizenship. In some cases, misogyny rewards women for accepting an inferior status.

Misogyny can be understood both as an attitude held by individuals, primarily by men, and as a widespread cultural custom or system. Sometimes misogyny manifests in obvious and bold ways; other times it is more subtle or disguised in ways that provide plausible deniability.

In feminist thought, misogyny is related to femmephobia, the rejection of feminine qualities. It holds in contempt institutions, work, hobbies, or habits associated with women. It rejects any aspects of men that are seen as feminine or unmanly. Racism and other prejudices may reinforce and overlap with misogyny.

The English word misogyny was coined in the middle of the 17th century from the Greek misos 'hatred' + gunē 'woman'. The word was rarely used until it was popularised by second-wave feminism in the 1970s.

== Definitions ==
English and American dictionaries define misogyny as "hatred of women" and as "hatred, dislike, or mistrust of women".

In 2012, primarily in response to a speech in the Australian Parliament, the Macquarie Dictionary (which documents Australian English and New Zealand English) expanded its definition to include not only hatred of women but also "entrenched prejudices against women".

=== Distinctions from other terms ===
The American Merriam-Webster Dictionary distinguishes misogyny, "a hatred of women", from sexism, which denotes sex-based discrimination, and "behavior, conditions, or attitudes that foster stereotypes of social roles based on sex".

Philosopher Kate Manne distinguishes these terms:

- Patriarchy — a system of power
- Sexism — a theory justifying that system, and
- Misogyny — the "enforcement arm" of that system.

Manne defines misogyny as the attempt to control and punish women who challenge male dominance. She finds the traditional "hatred of women" definition of misogyny too simplistic, noting it does not account for how perpetrators of misogynistic violence may love certain women; for example, their mothers. Instead, misogyny rewards women who uphold the status quo and punishes those who reject women's subordinate status. Manne distinguishes sexism, which she says seeks to rationalise and justify patriarchy, from misogyny, which she calls the "law enforcement" branch of patriarchy:

[S]exist ideology will tend to discriminate between men and women, typically by alleging sex differences beyond what is known or could be known, and sometimes counter to our best current scientific evidence. Misogyny will typically differentiate between good women and bad ones, and punishes the latter. […] Sexism wears a lab coat; misogyny goes on witch hunts.

Femininity researcher Rhea Ashley Hoskin dinstinguishes between oppression based on female gender, and oppression based on feminine gender expression. The academic term for the latter is femmephobia.

=== In sociology and psychology ===
Social psychology research describes overt misogyny as "blatant hostile sexism" that raises resistance in women, as opposed to "manifestations of benevolent sexism" or chivalry that lead women to behave in a manner perpetuating patriarchal arrangements.

According to sociologist Allan G. Johnson, "misogyny is a cultural attitude of hatred for females because they are female". Johnson argues that:

Misogyny .... is a central part of sexist prejudice and ideology and, as such, is an important basis for the oppression of females in male-dominated societies. Misogyny is manifested in many different ways, from jokes to pornography to violence to the self-contempt women may be taught to feel toward their own bodies.

Sociologist Michael Flood at the University of Wollongong defines misogyny as the hatred of women, and notes:

Though most common in men, misogyny also exists in and is practiced by women against other women or even themselves. Misogyny functions as an ideology or belief system that has accompanied patriarchal, or male-dominated societies for thousands of years and continues to place women in subordinate positions with limited access to power and decision making. […] Aristotle contended that women exist as natural deformities or imperfect males […] Ever since, women in Western cultures have internalised their role as societal scapegoats, influenced in the twenty-first century by multimedia objectification of women with its culturally sanctioned self-loathing and fixations on plastic surgery, anorexia and bulimia.

=== Other forms of the word ===
Misogynous and misogynistic can both be used as an adjectival form of the word. The noun misogynist can be used for a woman-hating person. The counterpart of misogyny is misandry, the hatred or dislike of men. Marc A. Ouellette argues in International Encyclopedia of Men and Masculinities that "misandry lacks the systemic, transhistoric, institutionalized, and legislated antipathy of misogyny". Anthropologist David Gilmore argues that misogyny is a "near-universal phenomenon" and that there is no male equivalent. The antonym of misogyny, philogyny—love or fondness towards women— is not widely used. Words derived from the word misogyny and denoting connected concepts include misogynoir, the intersection of anti-black racism and misogyny faced by Black women; transmisogyny, the intersection of misogyny and transphobia faced by trans women and transfeminine people; and transmisogynoir, the confluence of these faced by black trans women and transfeminine people.

== Origins ==
Misogyny likely arose at the same time as patriarchy: three to five thousand years ago at the start of the Bronze Age. The three main monotheistic religions of Judaism, Christianity and Islam promoted patriarchal societal structures, and used misogyny to keep women at a lower status. Misogyny gained strength in the Middle Ages, especially in Christian societies. In parallel to these, misogyny was also practised in societies such as the Romans, Greeks, and the tribes of the Amazon Basin and Melanesia, who did not follow a monotheistic religion. Nearly every human culture contains evidence of misogyny.

Anthropologist David D. Gilmore argues that misogyny is rooted in men's conflicting feelings: men's existential dependence on women for procreation, and men's fear of women's power over them in their times of male weakness, contrasted against the deep-seated needs of men for the love, care and comfort of women—a need that makes the men feel vulnerable.

Angela Saini notes that a large proportion of women in ancient societies were kidnapped brides from other cultures. Such a woman was often forced to marry a man who had killed her family. Misogynistic suspicion in ancient Greece and elsewhere is to some degree explained by male anxiety that women would some day revolt against their captors. Saini argues that patriarchy and gender stereotyping emerged at the same time as the state.

== Historical usage ==
=== Classical Greece ===
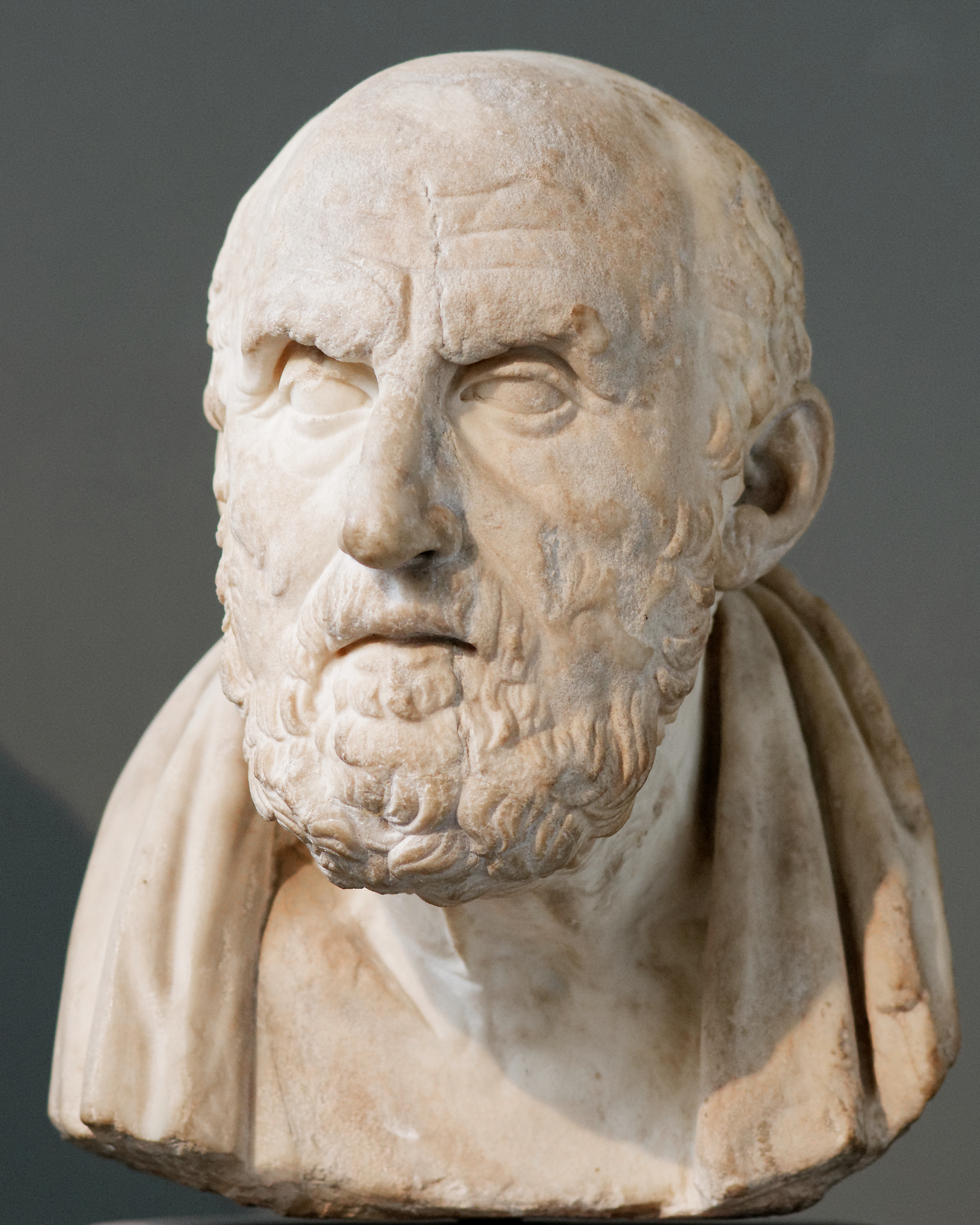
Roman copy of a Hellenistic bust of Chrysippus (British Museum)

In his book City of Sokrates: An Introduction to Classical Athens, J.W. Roberts argues that older than tragedy and comedy was a misogynistic tradition in Greek literature, reaching back at least as far as Hesiod. He claims that the term misogyny itself comes directly into English from the Ancient Greek word misogunia (μισογυνία), which survives in several passages.

The earlier, longer, and more complete passage comes from a moral tract known as On Marriage (c. 150 BC) by the stoic philosopher Antipater of Tarsus. pp. 221–226.

Misogunia appears in the accusative case on page 224 of Deming, as the fifth word in line 33 of his Greek text. It is split over lines 25–26 in von Arnim. Antipater argues that marriage is the foundation of the state, and considers it to be based on divine (polytheistic) decree. He uses misogunia to describe the sort of writing the tragedian Euripides eschews, stating that he "reject[s] the hatred of women in his writing" (ἀποθέμενος τὴν ἐν τῷ γράφειν μισογυνίαν). He then offers an example of this, quoting from a lost play of Euripides in which the merits of a dutiful wife are praised.

According to Tieleman other surviving use of the Ancient Greek word is by Chrysippus, in a fragment from On affections, quoted by Galen in Hippocrates on Affections. Here, misogyny is the first in a short list of three "disaffections"—women (misogunia), wine (misoinia, μισοινία) and humanity (misanthrōpia, μισανθρωπία). Chrysippus' point is more abstract than Antipater's, and Galen quotes the passage as an example of an opinion contrary to his own. What is clear, however, is that he groups hatred of women with hatred of humanity generally, and even hatred of wine. "It was the prevailing medical opinion of his day that wine strengthens body and soul alike." So Chrysippus, like his fellow stoic Antipater, views misogyny negatively, as a disease; a dislike of something that is good. It is this issue of conflicted or alternating emotions that was philosophically contentious to the ancient writers. Ricardo Salles suggests that the general stoic view was that "[a] man may not only alternate between philogyny and misogyny, philanthropy and misanthropy, but be prompted to each by the other".

In the Routledge philosophy guidebook to Plato and the Republic, Nickolas Pappas describes the "problem of misogyny" and states:

In the Apology, Socrates calls those who plead for their lives in court "no better than women" (35b)... The Timaeus warns men that if they live immorally they will be reincarnated as women (42b-c; cf. 75d-e). The Republic contains a number of comments in the same spirit (387e, 395d-e, 398e, 431b-c, 469d), evidence of nothing so much as of contempt toward women. Even Socrates' words for his bold new proposal about marriage... suggest that the women are to be "held in common" by men. He never says that the men might be held in common by the women... We also have to acknowledge Socrates' insistence that men surpass women at any task that both sexes attempt (455c, 456a), and his remark in Book 8 that one sign of democracy's moral failure is the sexual equality it promotes (563b).

Misogynist is also found in the Greek—misogunēs (μισογύνης)—in Deipnosophistae and in Plutarch's Parallel Lives, where it is used as the title of Heracles in the history of Phocion. It was the title of a play by Menander, which we know of from book seven (concerning Alexandria) of Strabo's 17 volume Geography, and quotations of Menander by Clement of Alexandria and Stobaeus that relate to marriage. A Greek play with a similar name, Misogunos (Μισόγυνος) or Woman-hater, is reported by Marcus Tullius Cicero (in Latin) and attributed to the poet Marcus Atilius.

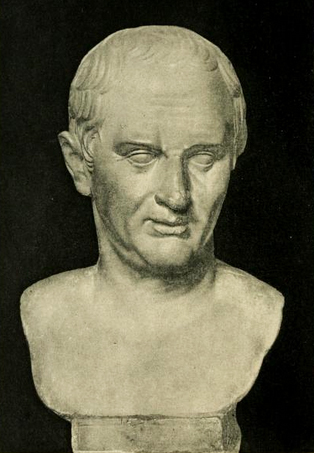
Marcus Tullius Cicero

Cicero reports that Greek philosophers considered misogyny to be caused by gynophobia, a fear of women.

It is the same with other diseases; as the desire of glory, a passion for women, to which the Greeks give the name of philogyneia: and thus all other diseases and sicknesses are generated. But those feelings which are the contrary of these are supposed to have fear for their foundation, as a hatred of women, such as is displayed in the Woman-hater of Atilius; or the hatred of the whole human species, as Timon is reported to have done, whom they call the Misanthrope. Of the same kind is inhospitality. And all these diseases proceed from a certain dread of such things as they hate and avoid.

— Cicero, Tusculanae Quaestiones, 1st century BC.

In summary, despite considering women as generally inferior to men, Greek literature considered misogyny to be a disease—an anti-social condition—in that it ran contrary to their perceptions of the value of women as wives and of the family as the foundation of society. These points are widely noted in the secondary literature.

=== English language ===
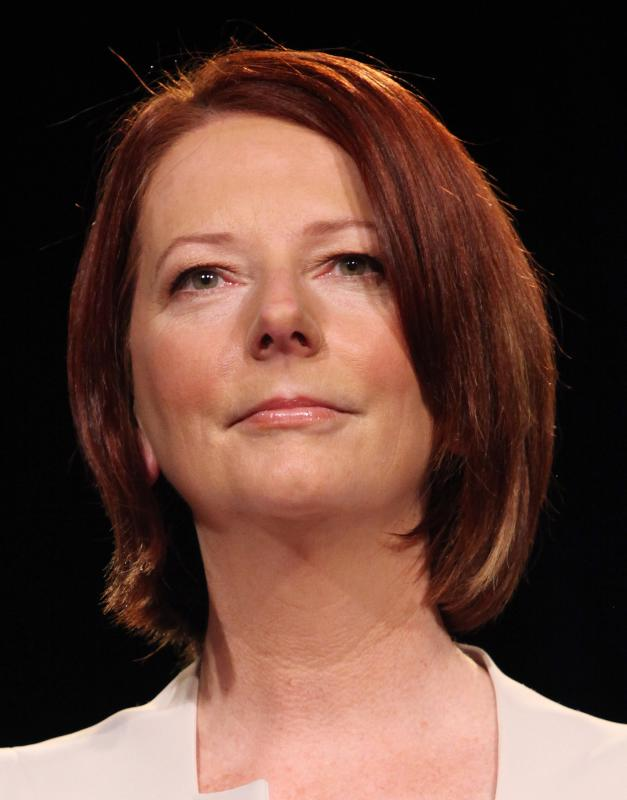
Julia Gillard

According to the Oxford English Dictionary, the word entered English because of an anonymous proto-feminist play, Swetnam the Woman-Hater, published in 1620 in England. The play is a criticism of anti-woman writer Joseph Swetnam, who it represents with the pseudonym Misogynos. The character of Misogynos is the origin of the term misogynist in English.

The term was fairly rare until the mid-1970s. The publication of feminist Andrea Dworkin's 1974 critique Woman Hating popularised the idea. The term misogyny entered the lexicon of second-wave feminism. Dworkin and her contemporaries used the term to include not only a hatred or contempt of women, but the practice of controlling women with violence and punishing women who reject subordination.

Misogyny was discussed worldwide in 2012 because of a viral video of a speech by Australian Prime Minister Julia Gillard. Her parliamentary address is known as the Misogyny Speech. In the speech, Gillard powerfully criticised her opponents for holding her policies to a different standard than those of male politicians, and for speaking about her in crudely sexual terms. She was criticised for systemic misogyny, because earlier in the day her Labour Party had passed legislation cutting $728 million in welfare benefits to single mothers.

Gillard's usage of the word "misogyny" promoted re-evaluations of the word's published definitions. The Macquarie Dictionary revised its definition in 2012 to better match the way the word has been used over the prior 30 years. The book Down Girl, which reconsidered the definition using the tools of analytic philosophy, was inspired in part by Gillard.

== Religion ==
=== Ancient Greek ===
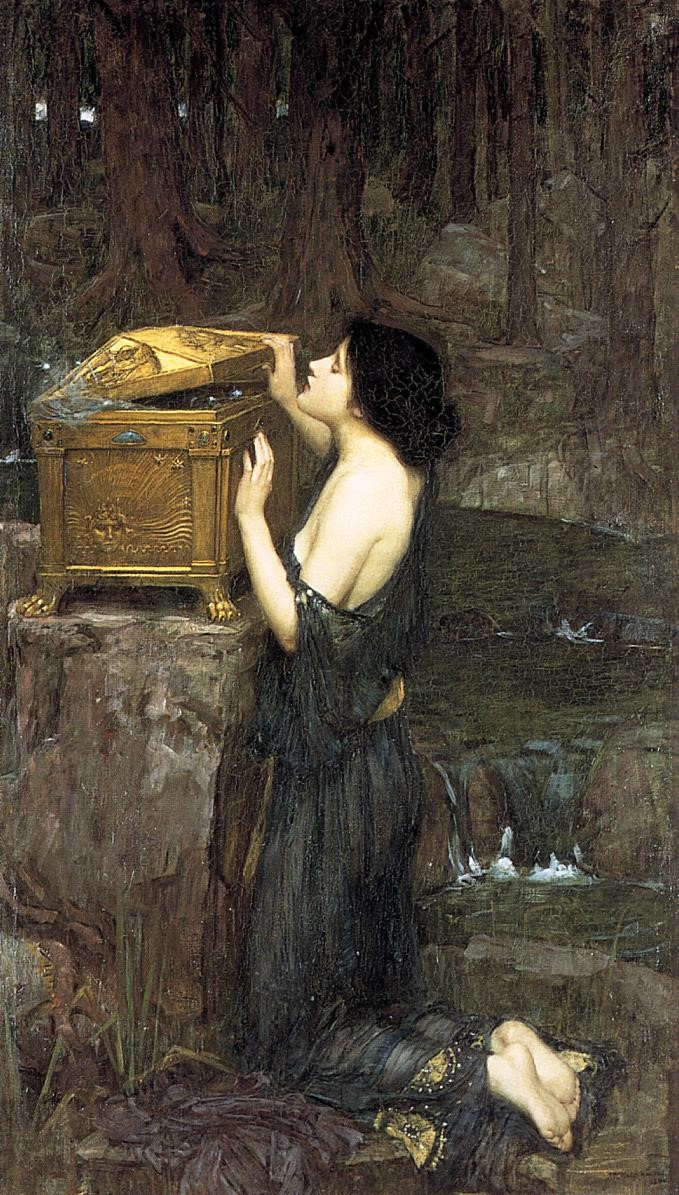
Pandora by John William Waterhouse, 1896

In Misogyny: The World's Oldest Prejudice, Jack Holland argues that there is evidence of misogyny in the mythology of the ancient world. In Greek mythology according to Hesiod, the human race had already experienced a peaceful, autonomous existence as a companion to the gods before the creation of women. When Prometheus decides to steal the secret of fire from the gods, Zeus becomes infuriated and decides to punish humankind with an "evil thing for their delight". This "evil thing" is Pandora, the first woman, who carried a jar (usually described—incorrectly—as a box) which she was told to never open. Pandora cannot resist peeking into the jar, and by opening it she unleashes into the world all evil; labour, sickness, old age, and death.

=== Buddhism ===
In his book The Power of Denial: Buddhism, Purity, and Gender, professor Bernard Faure of Columbia University argued that "Buddhism is paradoxically neither as sexist nor as egalitarian as is usually thought". He remarked, "Many feminist scholars have emphasised the misogynistic (or at least androcentric) nature of Buddhism" and stated that Buddhism morally exalts its male monks while the mothers and wives of the monks also have important roles. Additionally, he wrote:

While some scholars see Buddhism as part of a movement of emancipation, others see it as a source of oppression. Perhaps this is only a distinction between optimists and pessimists, if not between idealists and realists... As we begin to realise, the term "Buddhism" does not designate a monolithic entity, but covers a number of doctrines, ideologies, and practices--some of which seem to invite, tolerate, and even cultivate "otherness" on their margins.

=== Christianity ===
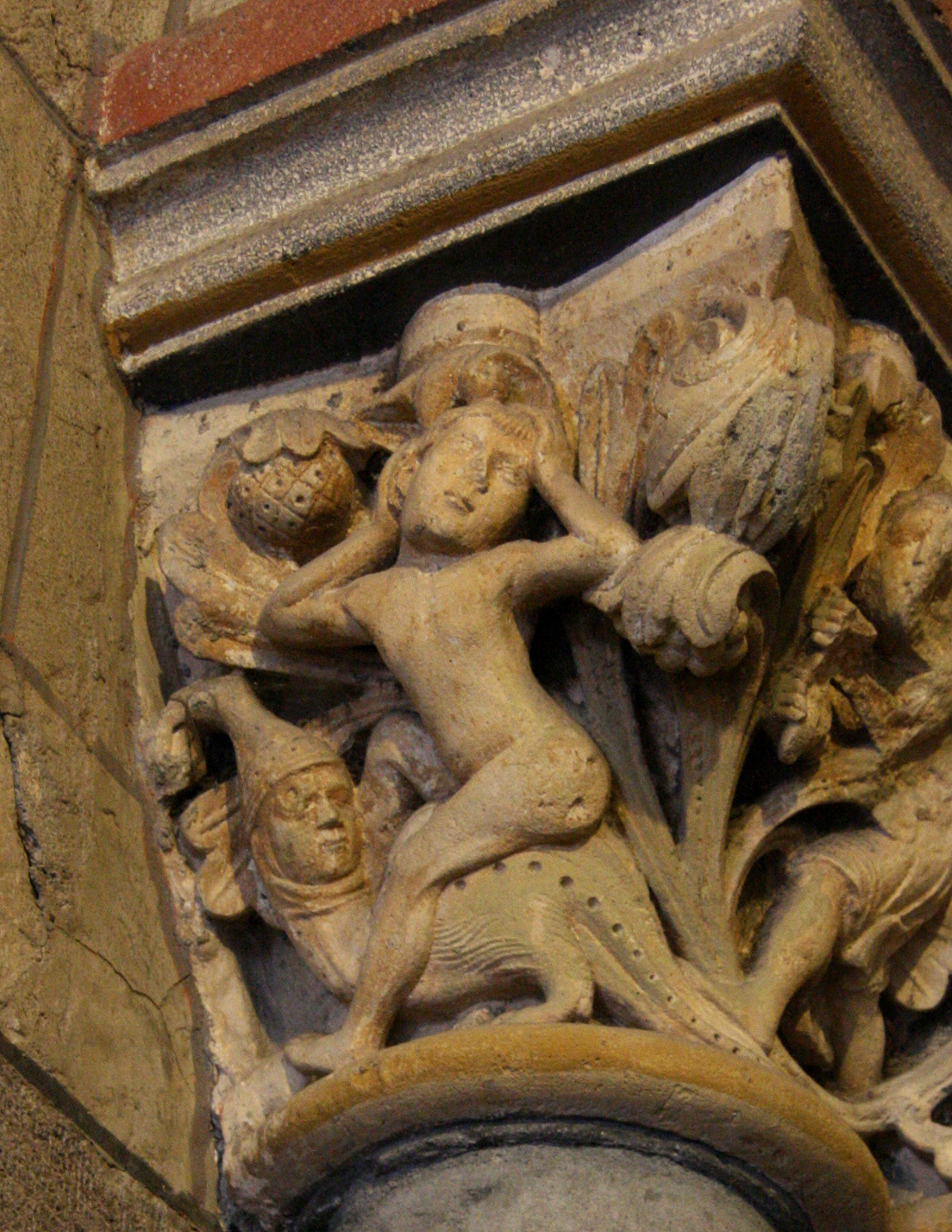
Eve rides astride the Serpent on a capital in Laach Abbey church, 13th century.

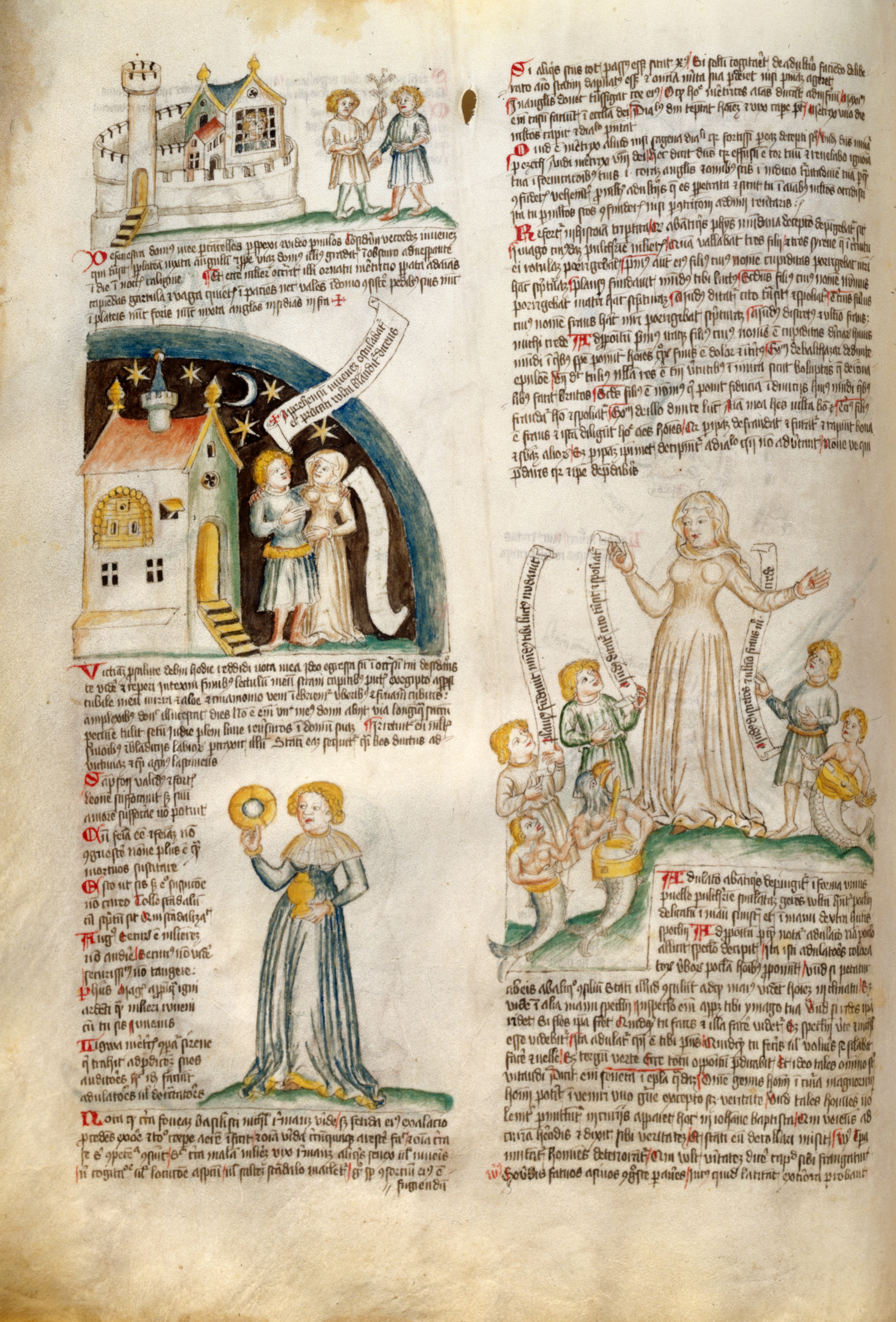
Personification of the seven deadly sins, Mediaeval

Differences in tradition and interpretations of scripture have caused sects of Christianity to differ in their beliefs with regard to their treatment of women.

In The Troublesome Helpmate, Katharine M. Rogers argues that Christianity is misogynistic, and she lists what she says are specific examples of misogyny in the Pauline epistles. She states: "The foundations of early Christian misogyny—its guilt about sex, its insistence on female subjection, its dread of female seduction—are all in St. Paul's epistles." In K. K. Ruthven's Feminist Literary Studies: An Introduction, Ruthven makes reference to Rogers' book and argues that the "legacy of Christian misogyny was consolidated by the so-called 'Fathers' of the Church, like Tertullian, who thought a woman was not only 'the gateway of the devil' but also 'a temple built over a sewer'."

Several Christian institutions exclude women. For example, women are excluded from the Mount Athos region of Greece and from the governing hierarchy of the Catholic Church. Some Christian theologians, such as John Knox in his book The First Blast of the Trumpet Against the Monstruous Regiment of Women, have written that women should be excluded from secular government institutions for religious reasons.

However, some other scholars have argued that Christianity does not include misogynistic principles, or at least that a proper interpretation of Christianity would not include misogynistic principles. David M. Scholer, a biblical scholar at Fuller Theological Seminary, stated that the verse Galatians 3:28 ("There is neither Jew nor Greek, there is neither slave nor free, there is neither male nor female; for you are all one in Christ Jesus") is "the fundamental Pauline theological basis for the inclusion of women and men as equal and mutual partners in all of the ministries of the church".

In Christian Men Who Hate Women, clinical psychologist Margaret J. Rinck has written that Christian social culture often allows a misogynist "misuse of the biblical ideal of submission". However, she argues that this a distortion of the "healthy relationship of mutual submission" which is actually specified in Christian doctrine, where "[l]ove is based on a deep, mutual respect as the guiding principle behind all decisions, actions, and plans". Similarly, Catholic scholar Christopher West argues that "male domination violates God's plan and is the specific result of sin".

=== Islam ===
The fourth chapter (or sura) of the Quran is called "Women" (an-nisa). The 34th verse is a key verse in feminist criticism of Islam. The verse notes men's God-given advantages over women. They are consequently their protectors and maintainers. Where women are disobedient "admonish them, and leave them alone in the sleeping-places and beat them; then if they obey you, do not seek a way against them..." In his book No god but God, University of Southern California, Professor Reza Aslan wrote that "misogynistic interpretation" has been persistently attached to An-Nisa, 34 because commentary on the Quran "has been the exclusive domain of Muslim men".

In his book Popular Islam and Misogyny: A Case Study of Bangladesh, Taj Hashmi discusses misogyny in relation to Muslim culture, writing:

[T]hanks to the subjective interpretations of the Quran (almost exclusively by men), the preponderance of the misogynic mullahs and the regressive Shariah law in most "Muslim" countries, Islam is synonymously known as a promoter of misogyny in its worst form.... we may draw a line between the Quranic texts and the corpus of avowedly misogynic writing and spoken words by the mullah having very little or no relevance to the Quran.

The economic and social position of men and women was reflected in blood money to the family of a victim. The financial loss for a woman was pegged at half that of a man.

=== Sikhism ===
Scholars William M. Reynolds and Julie A. Webber have written that Guru Nanak, the founder of the Sikh faith tradition, was a "fighter for women's rights" that was "in no way misogynistic" in contrast to some of his contemporaries. However, unconscious misogynistic attitudes in Sikh men have steadily reduced the power of women in Sikhism, such that the Sikh community has been observed to contain toxic masculinity.

== Misogynistic ideas among prominent Western thinkers ==
Numerous influential Western philosophers have expressed ideas that have been characterised as misogynistic, including Aristotle, René Descartes, Thomas Hobbes, John Locke, David Hume, Jean-Jacques Rousseau, G. W. F. Hegel, Arthur Schopenhauer, Friedrich Nietzsche, Sigmund Freud, Otto Weininger, Oswald Spengler, and John Lucas. Because of the influence of these thinkers, feminist scholars trace misogyny in Western culture to these philosophers and their ideas.

=== Aristotle ===
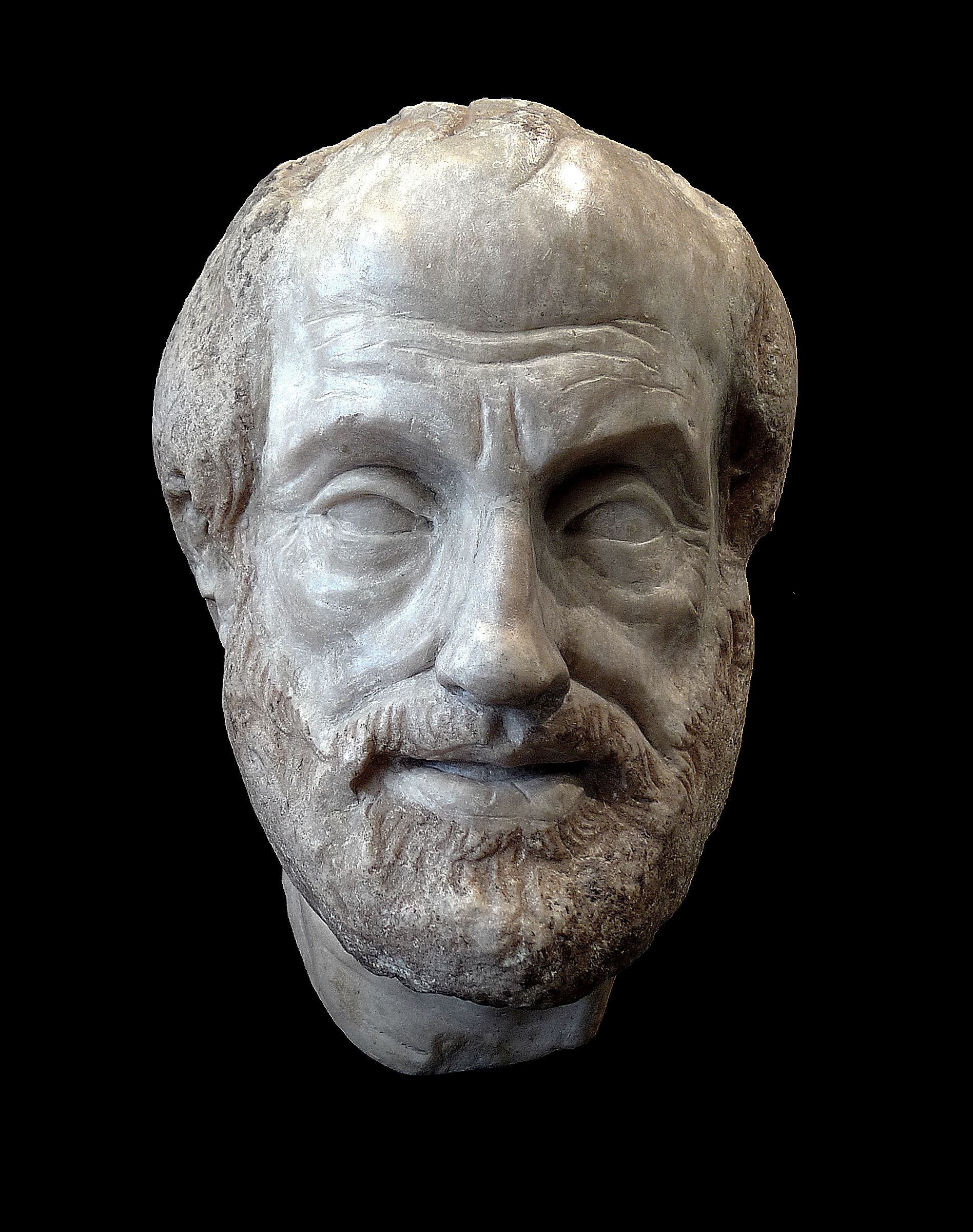
Portrait of Aristotle, copy of Lysippos, Louvre

Aristotle believed women were inferior and described them as "deformed males". In his work Politics, he states

as regards the sexes, the male is by nature superior and the female inferior, the male ruler and the female subject 4 (1254b13-14).

Another example is Cynthia's catalogue in which Cynthia states "Aristotle says that the courage of a man lies in commanding, a woman's lies in obeying; that 'matter yearns for form, as the female for the male and the ugly for the beautiful'; that women have fewer teeth than men; that a female is an incomplete male or 'as it were, a deformity'. Aristotle believed that men and women naturally differed both physically and mentally. He claimed that women are "more mischievous, less simple, more impulsive ... more compassionate[,] ... more easily moved to tears[,] ... more jealous, more querulous, more apt to scold and to strike[,] ... more prone to despondency and less hopeful[,] ... more void of shame or self-respect, more false of speech, more deceptive, of more retentive memory [and] ... also more wakeful; more shrinking [and] more difficult to rouse to action" than men.

=== Jean-Jacques Rousseau ===
Jean-Jacques Rousseau is well known for his views against equal rights for women. For example, in his treatise Emile, he writes: "Always justify the burdens you impose upon girls but impose them anyway ... . They must be thwarted from an early age ... . They must be exercised to constraint, so that it costs them nothing to stifle all their fantasies to submit them to the will of others." He also writes that women should be "closed up in their houses" and "must receive the decisions of fathers and husbands like that of the church."

=== Arthur Schopenhauer ===
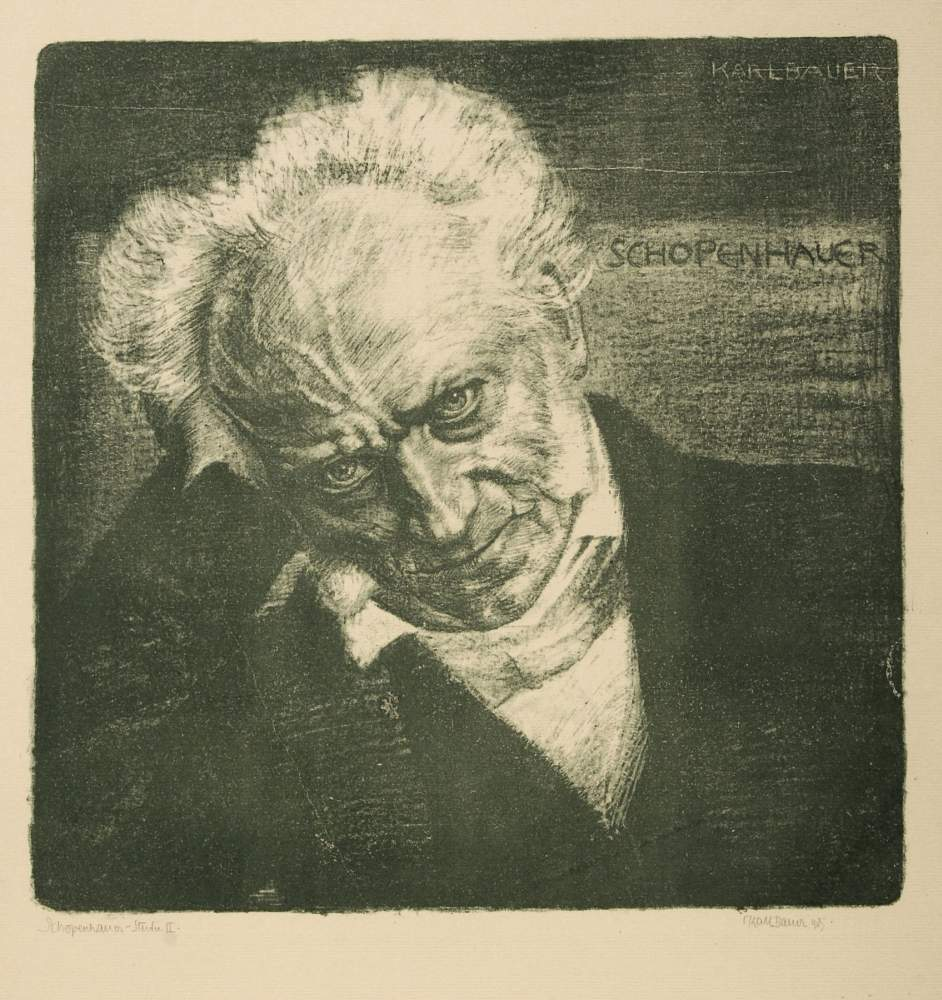
Schopenhauer by Karl Bauer

Based on his essay "On Women" (Über die Weiber), Arthur Schopenhauer has been noted as a misogynist by many such as the philosopher, critic, and author Tom Grimwood. In a 2008 article published in the philosophical journal of Kritique, Grimwood argues that Schopenhauer's misogynistic works have largely escaped attention despite being more noticeable than those of other philosophers such as Nietzsche.

Schopenhauer condemned what he called "Teutonico-Christian stupidity" on female affairs. He argued that women are "by nature meant to obey" as they are "childish, frivolous, and short sighted". He also argued that women did not possess any real beauty:

It is only a man whose intellect is clouded by his sexual impulse that could give the name of the fair sex to that under-sized, narrow-shouldered, broad-hipped, and short-legged race; for the whole beauty of the sex is bound up with this impulse. Instead of calling them beautiful there would be more warrant for describing women as the unaesthetic sex.

=== Nietzsche ===
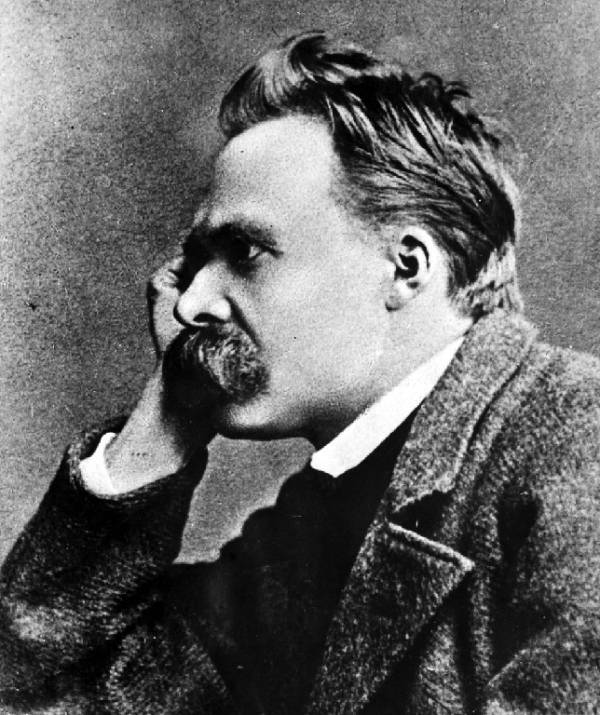
Friedrich Wilhelm Nietzsche

In Beyond Good and Evil, Friedrich Nietzsche stated that stricter controls on women was a condition of "every elevation of culture". In his Thus Spoke Zarathustra, he has a female character say "You are going to women? Do not forget the whip!" In Twilight of the Idols, Nietzsche writes "Women are considered profound. Why? Because we never fathom their depths. But women aren't even shallow." There is controversy over the questions of whether or not this amounts to misogyny, whether his polemic against women is meant to be taken literally, and the exact nature of his opinions of women.

=== Hegel ===
Hegel's view of women has been characterised as misogynistic. Passages from Hegel's Elements of the Philosophy of Right illustrate the criticism:

Women are capable of education, but they are not made for activities which demand a universal faculty such as the more advanced sciences, philosophy and certain forms of artistic production... Women regulate their actions not by the demands of universality, but by arbitrary inclinations and opinions.

== Violence ==
=== Terrorism and hate crimes ===
Femicide is the name of a hate crime, the intentional killing of women or girls on account of their sex. It is ideological misogynist killing, and in some cases may also be an example of domestic violence.

Misogynist terrorism is terrorism intended to punish women. Since 2018 counter-terrorism professionals such as ICCT and START have tracked misogyny or male supremacy as ideologies that have motivated terrorism. They describe this form of terror as a "rising threat". Among the attacks designated as misogynist terrorism are the 2014 Isla Vista killings and the 2018 Toronto van attack. Some of the attackers have identified with the incel movement, and were motivated to kill by a perception of being entitled to sexual access to women. However, misogyny is common among mass killers, even when it is not the primary motivation.

== Online misogyny ==
Misogynistic rhetoric is pervasive online and has grown more aggressive over time. Online misogyny includes both individual attempts to intimidate and denigrate women, denial of gender inequity (neosexism), and also coordinated, collective attempts such as vote brigading and the Gamergate antifeminist harassment campaign. In a paper written for the Journal of International Affairs, Kim Barker and Olga Jurasz discuss how online misogyny can lead to women facing obstacles when trying to engage in the public and political spheres of the Internet due to the abusive nature of these spaces. They also suggest regulations and shut downs of online misogyny through both governmental and non-governmental means.

=== Coordinated attacks ===
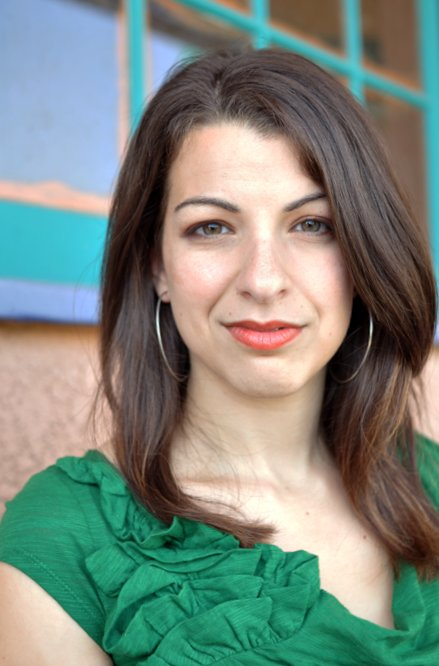
Anita Sarkeesian was the target of a coordinated misogynistic attack because of her feminist work.

The most likely targets for misogynistic attacks by coordinated groups are women who are visible in the public sphere, women who speak out about the threats they receive, such as Ethiopian feminists facing digital gender-based violence, and women who are perceived to be associated with feminism or feminist gains. Authors of misogynistic messages are usually anonymous or otherwise difficult to identify. Their rhetoric involves misogynistic epithets and graphic or sexualised imagery. It centres on the women's physical appearance, and prescribes sexual violence as a corrective for the targeted women. Examples of people who spoke out about misogynistic attacks are Anita Sarkeesian, Laurie Penny, Caroline Criado Perez, Stella Creasy, and Lindy West.

These attacks do not always remain online only. Swatting was used to bring Gamergate attacks into the physical world.

=== Language used ===
The insults and threats directed at different women tend to be very similar. Jude Doyle, who has been the target of online threats, noted the "overwhelmingly impersonal, repetitive, stereotyped quality" of the abuse, the fact that "all of us are being called the same things, in the same tone".

A 2016 study conducted by the think tank Demos found that the majority of Twitter messages containing the words "whore" or "slut" were advertisements for pornography. Of those that were not, a majority used the terms in a non-aggressive way, such a discussion of slut-shaming. Of those that used the terms "whore" or "slut" in an aggressive, insulting way, about half were women and half were men. Twitter users most frequently targeted by women with aggressive insults were celebrities, such as Beyoncé Knowles.

A 2020 study published in the journal New Media & Society also discusses how language on the internet can contribute to online misogyny. The authors specifically criticise Urban Dictionary, claiming the language used in the definitions are misogynistic and anti-feminist, rather than simply being a collaborative dictionary.

A 2021 study published at the meeting of the Association for Computational Linguistics notes that online misogyny presents differently in different contexts. For example: Spanish online discussions show a stronger presence of dominance; Italian misogyny has a plurality of stereotyping and objectification; English online misogyny most frequently involves discrediting women; and Danish discussions primarily express neo-sexism.

=== Incels ===
Incels, or involuntary celibates, is an online community of men who believe they cannot get into heterosexual relationships. They share a common belief that women pick partners based solely on looks, so due to their unattractiveness, they will be alone forever. Due to this perception of themselves, incels in turn hate women, and believe that men are systematically discriminated against. Incels have a large network of male-orientated websites dedicated to the cyber hate of women, discrimination, and networking of misogyny. In the incel form of misogyny, all women are discriminated against, however, women of colour are doubly denigrated by sexism and racism. Incels endorse and participate in sexism, racism, and mass violence. They are not only a threat in online communities, but they also carry their misogyny over to killing sprees, like the 2014 Isla Vista massacre that inspired other incel acts of violence. Incel existence and rhetoric is a good example of misogyny online.

=== With white supremacy ===
Andrew Anglin uses the white supremacist website The Daily Stormer as a platform to promote misogynistic conspiracy theories, claiming that politically active "[w]hite women across the Western world" are pushing for liberal immigration policies "to ensure an endless supply of Black and Arab men to satisfy their depraved sexual desires". In July 2018, Anglin summarised his misogynistic views, writing: "Look, I hate women. I think they deserve to be beaten, raped and locked in cages." The term misogynoir describes misogyny directed towards Black women where prejudice based upon race and gender play reinforcing roles.

== Psychological impact ==
Women who experience internalised misogyny may express it through minimising the value of women, mistrusting women, and believing gender bias in favour of men. A common manifestation of internalised misogyny is lateral violence. Misogyny has taken shape as sexual harassment.

Misogynist attitudes lead to the physical, sexual, and emotional abuse of gender nonconforming boys in childhood.

== Feminist theory ==
=== "Good" versus "bad" women ===
Many feminists have written that the notions of "good" women and "bad" women are imposed upon women in order to control them. Women who are easy to control, or who advocate for their own oppression, may be told they are good. The categories of bad and good also cause fighting among women; Helen Lewis identifies this "long tradition of regulating female behaviour by defining women in opposition to one another" as the architecture of misogyny.

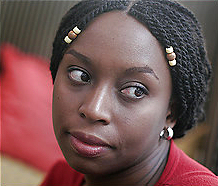
Chimamanda Ngozi Adichie

The Madonna–whore dichotomy or virgin/whore dichotomy is the perception of women as either good and chaste or as bad and promiscuous. Belief in this dichotomy leads to misogyny, according to the feminist perspective, because the dichotomy appears to justify policing women's behaviour. Misogynists seek to punish "bad" women for their sexuality. Author Chimamanda Ngozi Adichie observes that when women describe being harassed or assaulted (as in the #MeToo movement) they are viewed as deserving sympathy only if they are "good" women: non-sexual, and perhaps helpless.

In her 1974 book Woman Hating, Andrea Dworkin uses traditional fairy tales to illustrate misogyny. Fairy tales designate certain women as "good", for example Sleeping Beauty and Snow White, who are inert, passive characters. Dworkin observed that these characters "never think, act, initiate, confront, resist, challenge, feel, care, or question. Sometimes they are forced to do housework." In contrast, the "evil" women who populate fairy tales are queens, witches, and other women with power. Further, men in fairy tales are said to be good kings and good husbands irrespective of their actions. For Dworkin, this illustrates that under misogyny only powerless women are allowed to be seen as good. No similar judgement is applied to men.

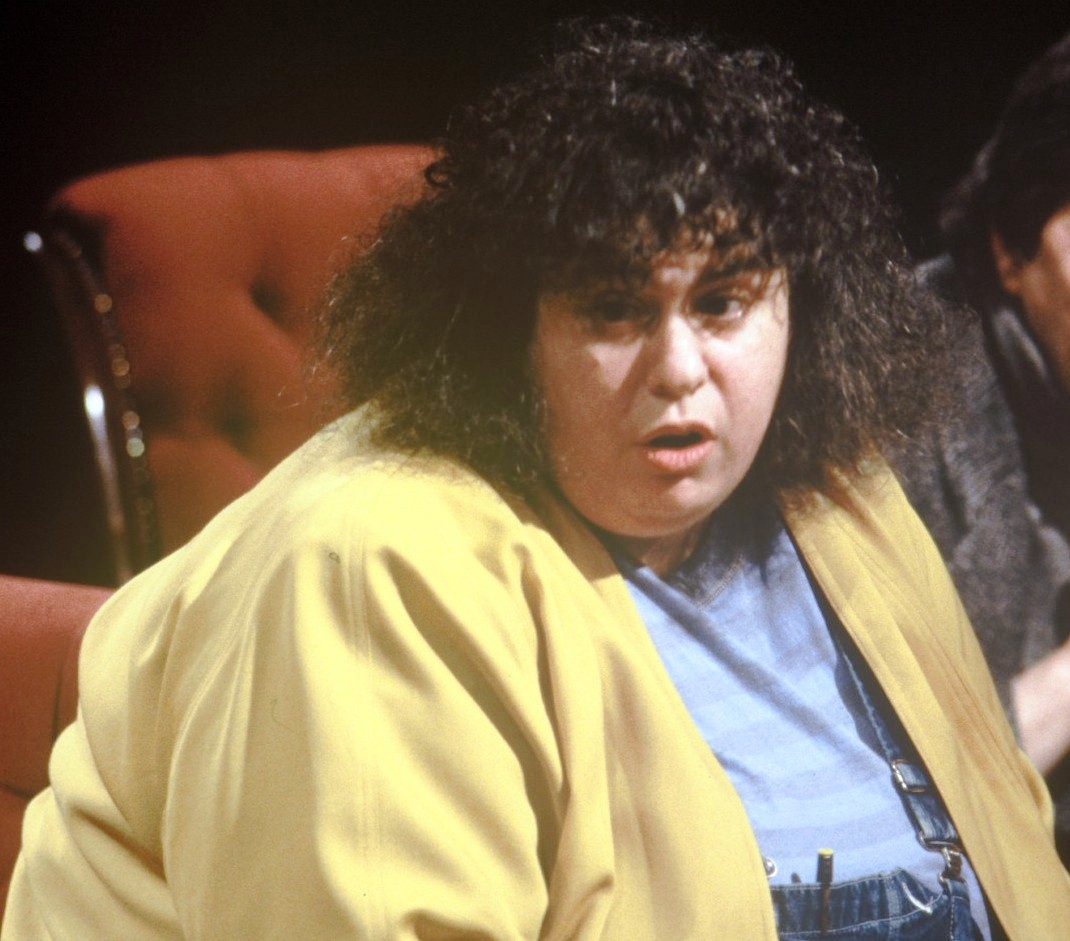
Andrea Dworkin

In her book Right-Wing Women, Dworkin adds that powerful women are tolerated by misogynists provided women use their power to reinforce the power of men and to oppose feminism. Dworkin gives Phyllis Schlafly and Anita Bryant as examples of powerful women tolerated by anti-feminists only because they advocated for their own oppression. Women may even be worshipped or called superior to men if they are sufficiently "good", meaning obedient or inert.

Philosopher Kate Manne argues that the word "misogyny" as used by modern feminists denotes not a generalised hatred of women, but instead the system of distinguishing good from bad women. Misogyny is like a police force, Manne writes, that rewards or punishes women based on these judgements.

=== Patriarchal bargain ===
In the late 20th century, second-wave feminist theorists argued that misogyny is both a cause and a result of patriarchal social structures.

Economist Deniz Kandiyoti has written that colonisers of the Middle East, Africa, and Asia kept conquered armies of men under control by offering them complete power over women. She calls this the "patriarchal bargain". Men who were interested in accepting the bargain were promoted to leadership by colonial powers, causing the colonised societies to become more misogynistic.

=== Contempt for the feminine ===
Julia Serano defines misogyny as not only hatred of women per se, but the "tendency to dismiss and deride femaleness and femininity". In this view, misogyny also causes homophobia against gay men because gay men are stereotyped as feminine and weak; misogyny likewise causes anxiety among straight men that they will be seen as unmanly. Serano's book Whipping Girl argues that most anti-trans sentiment directed at trans women should be understood as misogyny. By embracing femininity, the book argues, trans women cast doubt on the superiority of masculinity.

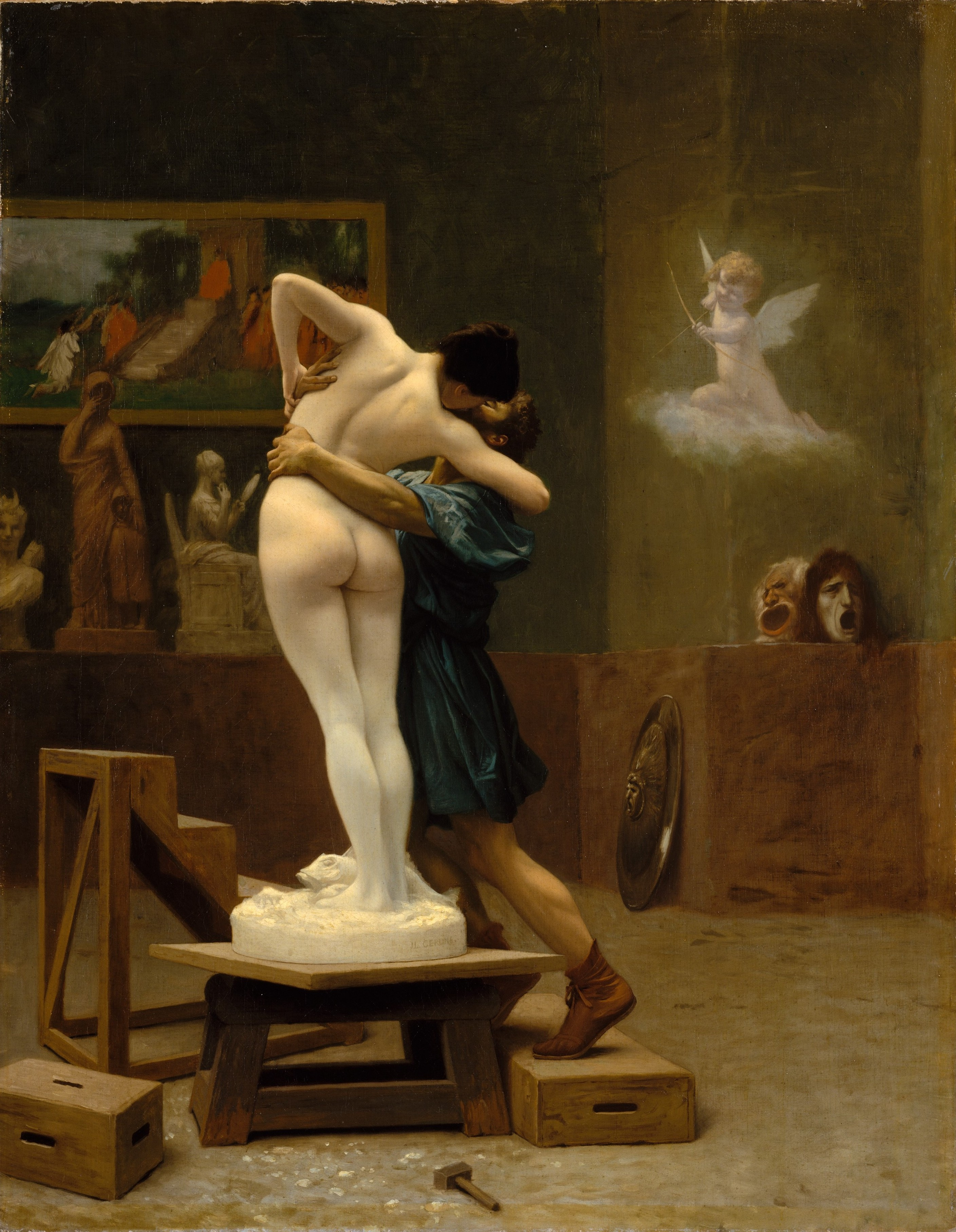
Jean-Léon Gérôme, Pygmalion and Galatea, c. 1890

Culture rewards traits that are considered masculine and devalues traits that seem feminine, according to Tracy M. Hallstead at Quinnipiac University. From childhood, boys and men are told to "man up" to appear tough by distancing themselves from feminine things. Boys learn that it is shameful to be seen as emotional, dependent, or vulnerable. Men raised in this way may disown femininity and may even learn to despise it. In this view, misogyny is directed not only at women, but at any feminine qualities that men see within themselves.

This contempt for the feminine causes men who feel that they must assert their dominance over women by controlling them, Hallstead writes. She illustrates this with the ancient story of Pygmalion, a sculptor who hated "the faults beyond measure which nature has given to women". Pygmalion creates a sculpture of a woman that magically comes alive. Pygmalion is very gratified by the complete control he has over the woman, Galatea, because this control re-enforces his masculinity. He considers Galatea the perfect woman, in spite of his contempt for women, because of his absolute power over her.

== English and Welsh law ==
In recent years, there has been increasing discussion in England and Wales of misogyny being added to the list of aggravating factors that are commonly referred to by the media as "hate crimes". Aggravating factors in criminal sentencing currently include hostility to a victim due to characteristics such as sexuality, race or disability.

In 2016, Nottinghamshire Police began a pilot project to record misogynistic behaviour as either hate crime or hate incidents, depending on whether the action was a criminal offence. Over two years (April 2016-March 2018) there were 174 reports made, of which 73 were classified as crimes and 101 as incidents.

In September 2018, it was announced that the Law Commission would conduct a review into whether misogynistic conduct, as well as hostility due to ageism, misandry or towards groups such as goths, should be treated as a hate crime.

In October 2018, two senior police officers, Sara Thornton, chair of the National Police Chiefs' Council, and Cressida Dick, Commissioner of the Metropolitan Police, stated that police forces should focus on more serious crimes such as burglary and violent offences, and not on recording incidents which are not crimes. Thornton said that "treating misogyny as a hate crime is a concern for some well-organised campaigning organisations", but that police forces "do not have the resources to do everything".

In September 2020 the Law Commission proposed that sex or gender be added to the list of protected characteristics. At the time of the Law Commission's proposals seven police forces in England and Wales classed misogyny as a hate crime, but that definition had not been adopted across the board. A Home Office spokesperson in October 2021 stated that police forces had been requested to record any crime the victim understood was driven by hostility to their sex.

== See also ==
- Androcentrism – Centering a masculine point of view
- Exploitation of women in mass media – Objections to media portrayal of women
- Gender in horror films
- Gender studies – Interdisciplinary field of study
- Misandry – Prejudice against, or hatred of, men
- Misogyny and mass media
- Misogyny in rap music – Controversy in hip-hop
- Misogyny in sports – Objectification, degrading, shaming, or absence of women in athletics
- Male chauvinism – Belief in the superiority of one's own group
- Women's rights – Rights claimed for women and girls worldwide
