= Neosexism =

Neosexism is defined by Tougas and her colleagues as the assertion that genders have already achieved equity, and that discrimination against women does not exist.

Neosexism against women is an implicit form of misogyny, which seeks to undermine and discredit the existence of gender inequity. Neosexism is based on covert sexist beliefs, which can go unnoticed, disappearing into cultural norms. Those who consider themselves supporters of women's rights may maintain non-traditional gender roles, but also exhibit subtle sexist beliefs, for example.

Requiring a higher level of proof based on an aspect of identity is a common form of discrimination. Neosexism covers situations where people are asked to provide higher levels of evidence than normal, based on the gender being discussed. This is often a delaying tactic used to avoid recognising a point that the user of neosexism is reluctant to accept and would rather avoid.

== Examples ==
Here follow some examples of neosexism from a 2021 study:

- Resenting identification of discrimination: "I often feel that people have treated me better and spoken nicer to me because I was a girl, so I have a hard time taking it seriously when people think that women are so discriminated against in the Western world."
- Questioning the existence of discrimination: "Can you point to research showing that childbirth is the reason why mothers miss out on promotions?"
- Presenting men as victims: "Classic. If it’s a disadvantage for women it’s the fault of society. If men, then it must be their own. Sexism thrives on the feminist wing."

== Bibliography ==
- Tougas 1995; Neosexism: Plus ça change, plus c'est pareil. Personality and Social Psychology Bulletin
- Campbell 1997; Evaluating measures of contemporary sexism. Psychology of Women Quarterly
- Tougas 1999; Neosexism among women: The role of personally experienced social mobility attempts. Personality and Social Psychology Bulletin
- Masser 1999; Contemporary sexism: The relationships among hostility, benevolence, and neosexism. Psychology of Women Quarterly
- Martinez 2010; Predicting gender awareness: The relevance of neo-sexism. Journal of Gender Studies
- Martinez 2013; Masculinity ideology and gender equality: Considering neosexism. ANALES DE PSICOLOGÍA
- Skewes 2021; Attitudes to Sexism and the #MeToo Movement at a Danish University. NORA - Nordic Journal of Feminist and Gender Research
- Zeinert 2021; Annotating Online Misogyny. Association for Computational Linguistics
