= Deniz Kandiyoti =

Turkish-British academic (born 1944)

- Born: 15 March 1944 (age 82); Istanbul, Turkey

Academic background
- Education: London School of Economics

Academic work
- Discipline: Gender relations and Islam
- Institutions: School of Oriental and African Studies, University of London

Deniz Kandiyoti (born 15 March 1944) is an author and an academic of research in the fields of gender relations and developmental politics in the Middle East, specifically Turkey. She holds a PhD from London School of Economics.

Her work on gender and Islam, especially in post-colonial and rural development areas, has been influential throughout the entire field. She has pioneered new research into understanding the implications of Islam and state policy on women, and as a result has brought more attention to the field.

As of 2010, Kandiyoti is Emeritus Professor in Development Studies at the School of Oriental and African Studies, part of the University of London, where she began working in 1992. She has done consultancy work for United Nations Development Programme (UNDP), International Labour Organization (ILO), United Nations Educational, Scientific and Cultural Organization (UNESCO) Organization for Security and Co-operation in Europe (OSCE), the UK's Department for International Development (DFID) and the United Nations Development Fund for Women (UNIFEM).

== Early life and education ==
Born in Istanbul, Turkey, Kandiyoti holds British and Turkish citizenships. She received a Bachelor of Arts from University of Paris in 1966 and a Master of Science in Social Psychology from the London School of Economics before receiving her PhD there as well.

== Career and research ==
Kandiyoti's early work focused on political economy and rural transformation, but then moved towards gender, nationalism and Islam. Most recently, her research has “returned to exploring the politics of gender in Muslim-majority societies but from an even broader comparative perspective” which involves Afghanistan and Uzbekistan as well as Turkey.

Kandiyoti's academic life has been based in theoretical as well as field-based studies. Her initial interest in gender came while doing field work for her PhD in Central Anatolia.

From 1969 until 1980, Kandiyoti worked at Istanbul Technical University and Boğaziçi University in Turkey, but then moved to England to teach at Richmond College in Surrey, England. Kandiyoti was a fellow at University of Manchester and the University of Sussex from 1987 to 1988. In 1988, she coined the term patriarchal bargain, describing a tactic in which a woman chooses to accommodate and accept gender roles that disadvantage women overall but maximize her individual power and options.

From 2000 to 2005, Kandiyoti was part of a research effort sponsored by United Nations Research Institute For Social Development (UNRISD). The major areas of research during that time for UNRISD were poverty eradication, promotion of democracy and human rights, gender equality, environmental sustainability, and the effects of globalization. She is also the editor of the journal Central Asian Survey, “the only established peer reviewed, multi-disciplinary journal in the world concerned with the history, politics, cultures, religions and economies of the Central Asian and Caucasian regions.” Kandiyoti's current project is entitled “Islam and the Politics of Gender.”

== Publications ==
- Kandiyoti, Deniz (1985). Women in rural production systems: problems and policies. Paris: UNESCO.

As part of a series entitled “Women in a World Perspective”, Kandiyoti “illustrates different patterns of women’s participation in rural production systems through a comparative analysis of cases from Africa, Asia, Latin America the Middle East and North Africa” (preface). ISBN 978-92-3-102296-8

- Kandiyoti, Deniz (September 1988). "Bargaining with Patriarchy". Gender and Society. 2 (3): 274–290. doi:10.1177/089124388002003004.

This article, published at a time where Islamic gender studies were rare and the field was nascent, caused notoriety. Since writing this article, Kandiyoti herself has critiqued it, calling it an “analytically flawed piece” (Hammami, 2006, pg 1350). She attributed the success of this article to an “ instant recognition of the phenomena [she] was describing, especially on the part of [her] colleagues in the South, who knew, almost intuitively, what [she] was talking about” (Hammami, 2006, pg 1350).

- Kandiyoti, Deniz, ed. (1991). Women, Islam, and the State. Philadelphia: Temple University Press. ISBN 9780877227861.

This book, a compilation of case studies regarding Islamic states and their histories with women. The book argues “that an adequate analysis of the position of women in Muslim societies must be grounded in a detailed examination of the political projects of contemporary states and of their historical transformations” (pg 2).

- Kandiyoti, Deniz (January 1990). "Women and rural development policies: the changing agenda". Development and Change. 21 (1): 5–22. doi:10.1111/j.1467-7660.1990.tb00365.x.

This paper reviews and evaluates policies directed at rural women in the Third World, as reflected in Women in development (WID) research and policy documents.

- Kandiyoti, Deniz (1996). Cariyeler, bacilar, yurttaslar: kimlikler ve toplumsal donusumler [Concubines, sisters, citizens: identities and social transformations]. Istanbul: Metis Yayinlari.

== See also ==
- Feminist economics
- List of feminist economists
- Women in Islam
