= Patriarchal bargain =

Strategies used by women within sex-based oppression systems

The term patriarchal bargain (Turkish: Ataerkil pazarlık) describes the strategies women employ to gain a greater degree of security and autonomy within the bounds of their sex-based oppression. Different forms of patriarchal oppression necessitate tailored patriarchal bargains, thus the concept can be used to reveal the particular dimensions of patriarchy in its various modalities across societies and cultures. The term was coined by Turkish author and researcher Deniz Kandiyoti in her article, "Bargaining with Patriarchy", which appeared in the September 1988 issue of Gender & Society. Sociologist Lisa Wade states that patriarchal bargain is "an individual strategy designed to manipulate the system to one’s best advantage, but one that leaves the system itself intact."

== Examples ==
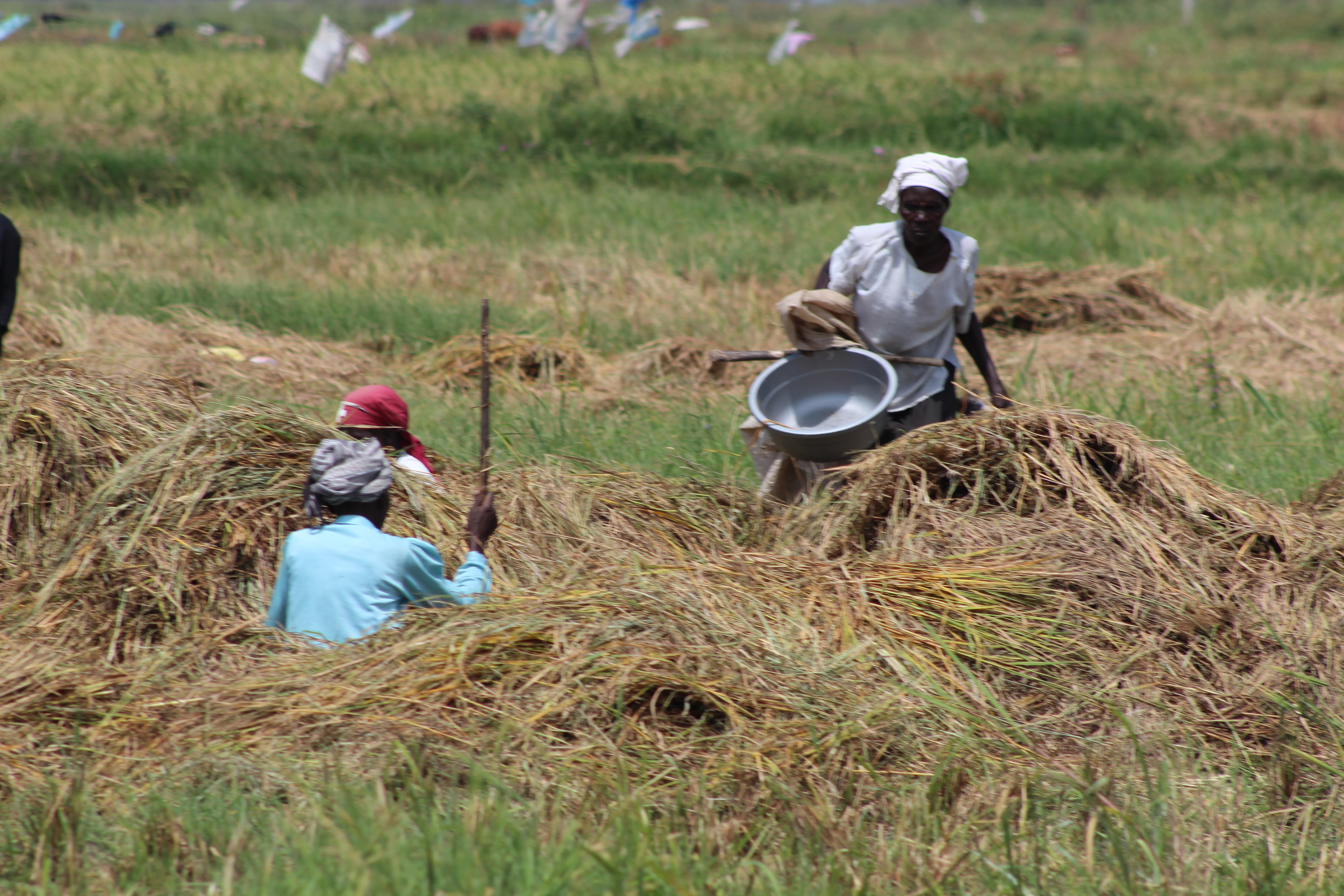
An irrigation scheme in Kenya

In the original article, Deniz Kandiyoti examines patriarchal bargains in the "classic patriarchy" of the Middle East, South Asia, and East Asia, and a polygynous system in Sub-Saharan Africa. The latter is presented as one end of a continuum at which women retain a relatively high level of autonomy by participating individually in rice-growing schemes and trade. As a result of the men's dependence on women's labour, concessions are made in the form of wages and land.

"Classic patriarchy" is contrasted as the opposite end of the continuum. In classic patriarchy the women's conventional navigation of patriarchy follows a cyclical pattern of patriarchal bargaining; a woman enters her husband's domain where she is subordinate to all men, and her mother-in-law. Producing male offspring and securing their enduring loyalty is paramount to the life-long project of gaining security, safety, and authority over her daughters-in-law. The patriarchal bargain of sustained "submissiveness and propriety" made over the course of her life produces rewards in the form of authority, affection, and approval.

In some societies, women are afforded rights and freedoms in the interest of the equality of the sexes. As women's life options outside of the patriarchal family unit expand, securing and enforcing a patriarchal bargain of the severity described in Kandiyoti's "classic patriarchy" example becomes increasingly difficult. In South Korea, women from other East Asian countries are recruited to fulfil the patriarchal bargain that South Korean women reject in favour of personal freedom and independence. Filipina women married to South Korean men enter a "neo-classical" patriarchal bargain by which reproductive labour and submission to her husband and parents in-law are exchanged for an opportunity to obtain South Korean citizenship; thereby gaining residential security and preferable economic conditions. The constraints of the patriarchal bargain are reinforced by immigration policies which require the husband's involvement in the wife's citizenship application, and which reward reproductive labour with simpler routes to citizenship.

== Patriarchal bargains and female conservatism ==
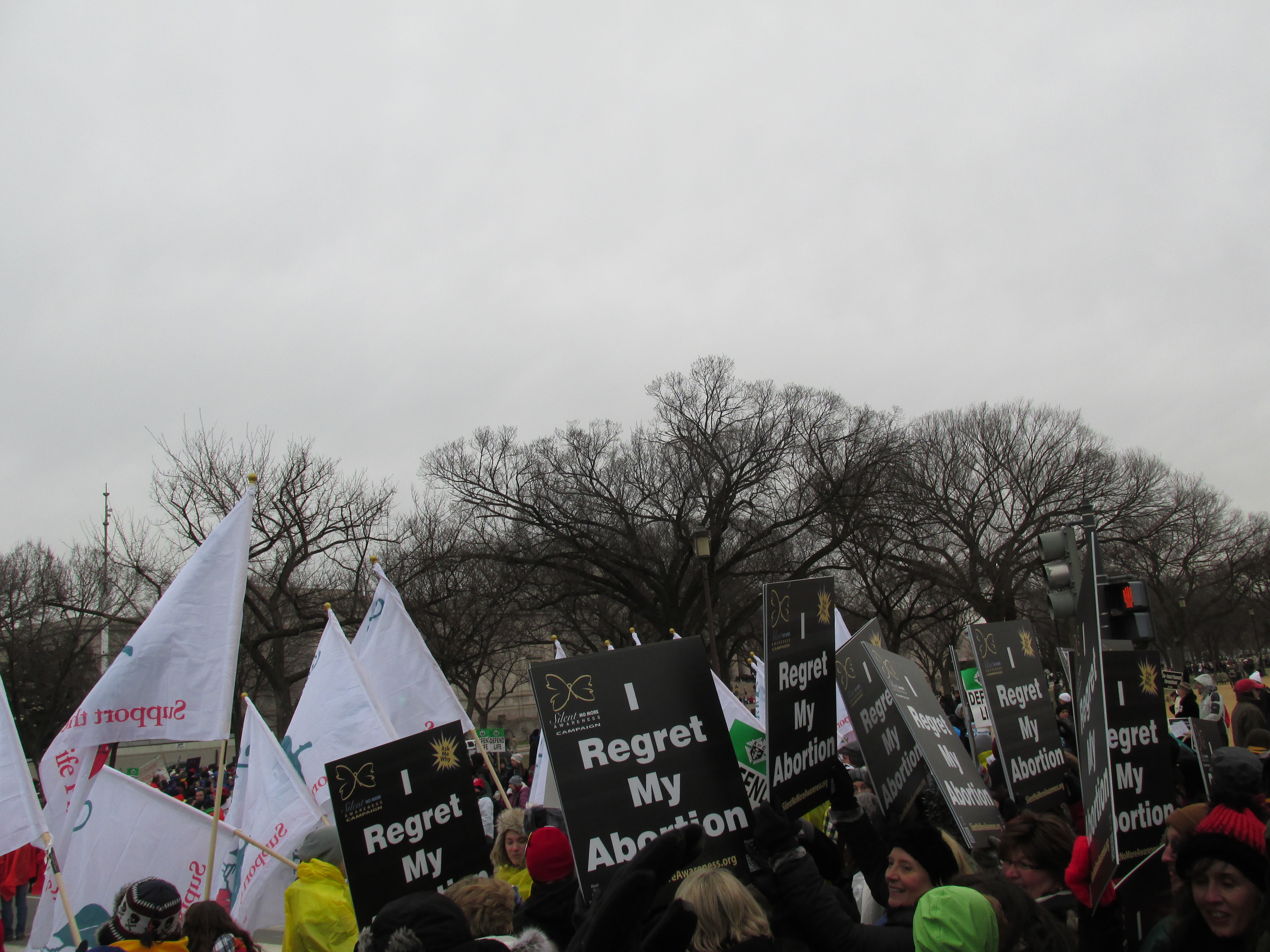
Anti-abortion protesters in Washington, D.C. (2013)

Kandiyoti pointed out that, under transformative pressures, women often resist changes to the patriarchal status quo, because they do not envisage equivalent or greater benefits than they already receive in return for their patriarchal bargain under the prevailing system. Women's involvement in various anti-feminist movements can be attributed to the patriarchal bargain. For example, following the 1979 Iranian Revolution women in that country embraced and sought to enforce Khomeini's reforms, under the notion that enthusiastic adherence to patriarchal norms would manifest the "implicit promise of increased male responsibility".

== See also ==
- Culture of Domesticity
- Economic inequality
- Inequality of bargaining power
