= Femmephobia =

Oppression and discrimination towards femininity

Femmephobia is loosely defined as the devaluation, denigration, and regulation of femininity in any gender or sex. The concept of femmephobia aligns with societal biases that result in discriminatory beliefs about, and behaviors toward, individuals who behave "like a woman", regardless of that person's gender identity, assigned sex, or sexuality. These biases associated with femininity include (but are not restricted to) the regulation of sexuality, or slut-shaming, biological determinism (the idea that femininity is inherently weak from a biological standpoint), masculine right of access, trivialization of femininity, and the exclusion from external identity. This bias can take many forms, including violence, social exclusion, bullying, and public humiliation. It is distinct from misogyny, as misogyny targets women whereas femmephobia targets femininity and can be applied to all genders. The term femmephobia originates from LGBTQ communities (specifically femme lesbian and sexual minority women's communities), but this bias has been observed outside of the LGBTQ community as well.

== Reasons ==
Social structures frequently place a higher value on masculinity than femininity, resulting in the perception of femininity as inferior. This dynamic enforces strict gender norms that urge men to be masculine and women to be feminine; many activists argue that this contributes to the devaluation and regulation of feminine expressions (i.e., femmephobia). These societal structures may also lead to femmephobic and bioessentialist associations, such as associating masculinity with strength and femininity with weakness. In turn, these norms often pressure men to reject feminine traits in order to align with traditional masculine ideals, thereby perpetuating negative attitudes toward femininity.

Additionally, societal expectations may restrict femininity to specific bodies or identities, reinforcing rigid norms surrounding gender expression, such as an expectation that only cisgender heterosexual women are feminine. These restrictions may result in a society which prefers that femininity be expressed by able-bodied, white, thin, and upper-middle class women who balance the Madonna/Whore dichotomy. Those who stray from such social expectations are met with femmephobia, which functions to police the boundaries of femininity. This regulation of expression is said to perpetuate the notion that femininity is excessive or inappropriate in certain contexts, thereby contributing to the prevalence of femmephobia.

Negative attitudes toward femininity, particularly when exhibited by men, are also a significant factor contributing to anti-gay behaviors. Research indicates that discomfort with male femininity is a stronger predictor of such behaviors than other factors, including social dominance or authoritarian beliefs.

== Etymology ==
The term femmephobia is a combination of the word femme, a French term meaning woman, and the suffix "-phobia," which signifies fear or aversion. Within the context of LGBTQ+ communities, the term femme (or fem) originates from 1940s butch/femme bar culture and communities where a femme (or feminine) lesbian was partnered with a butch (or masculine) lesbian.

In modern usage, "femme" refers to queer individuals who express or identify with femininity, regardless of their gender identity or sexual orientation. Femmephobia emerges from this identity and community, and generates a lens to rethink femininity as separate from “societal rules.” The concept of femmephobia is made visible through this lens. Thus, femmephobia refers to the devaluation and regulation of femininity across gender, sex, gender expression, and sexual orientation.

The concept of femmephobia has been explored in various contexts, particularly its role in reinforcing rigid gender norms, marginalizing feminine expressions and penalising any queered notions of femininity. Research suggests that the societal devaluation of femininity can result in discrimination and violence against individuals who display feminine traits, regardless of their gender.

== Types ==
Femmephobia consists of two interconnected elements: the devaluation of femininity and the regulation of femininity.

=== Anti-femininity bias ===
This form of femmephobia involves the systemic devaluation of feminine traits and expressions, often privileging masculinity and regarding femininity and things regarded as feminine as inherently inferior to masculinity. Individuals exhibiting feminine qualities may face discrimination or be perceived as less competent or capable. For example, in men's sports, femmephobia is used to shame, motivate or embarrass participants by linking femininity to weakness and mistakes.

Similarly, women in STEM or in the military may feel pressure to suppress their femininity in order to be taken seriously, avoid sexual harassment, or be seen as credible.

=== Gender policing ===
This form of femmephobia is the “regulatory” component, which polices femininity such that it aligns with societal expectations based on gender, assigned sex, sexuality, race, ability, and more. These expectations surrounding femininity are called “patriarchal femininity. Another core component of patriarchal femininity is called “masculine right of access.” Masculine right of access refers to the overarching assumption that femininity is for the purpose of attracting men and men’s attention.

Femmephobia reinforces rigid adherence to traditional gender norms and binaries, regulates femininity that deviates from patriarchal norms and punishes those who deviate from expected gendered behaviors. For instance, men who express femininity may face ridicule or social exclusion, which perpetuates the belief that femininity is unsuitable for certain genders.

Similarly, feminine sexual minority women challenge the masculine right of access by not performing femininity for the purpose of attracting men’s attention. They are met with social disapproval, largely from within the LGBTQ+ community, through exclusion, harassment, bullying, and violence.

=== Invisibility and marginalization ===
Individuals who identify as femme report experiencing invisibility within both LGBTQIA+ and broader communities. Their expressions of femininity are often overlooked, invalidated or dismissed, resulting in feelings of isolation and a lack of representation. Across various identities, research has found that there is a "masculine privilege" within LGBTQ+ communities.

=== Internalized femmephobia ===
Internalized femmephobia occurs when individuals adopt societal biases against femininity, resulting in self-rejection or self-hatred of their feminine traits. This internalized prejudice can negatively impact mental health and self-esteem.

== See also ==
- Homophobia
- Misogyny
- Misandry
- Toxic masculinity
- Gender role
- Gender policing
- Transphobia
- Double standards
- Derogatory terms
- Sexualization
- Hypermasculinity
- Intersectionality
