= Mannerism (behavior) =

Types of human behavior

When referring to human behavior, the word mannerism has two primary senses; in its first sense, it is used to refer to a habitual behavior peculiar to a particular individual. In particular, the term refers to affected or exaggerated speech or actions. Often these mannerisms are subtle and subconscious. They may be expressed in body language, manner of speech, tone of voice, etc. Examples of mannerisms in this sense are twirling one's hair, tapping one's fingers, or making particular facial expressions. Sometimes they are signs of particular emotional states; for example, a person who is anxious may start walking back and forth. Some mannerisms of a person may be indicative of an attempt to call attention to themselves.

The term is also used in psychopathology, referring to forms of ritualistic behavior that become pathologically exaggerated, interfering with goal-directed activities. Mannerisms of this kind can manifest as repetitive gestures, facial expressions, vocalizations, or any number of other types of behavior. They are associated with both neurological and psychiatric disorders, with schizophrenic mannerisms in particular being the subject of some sparse systematic research. They should be distinguished from tics: the former are fluidly integrated into person's behavior, while tics are sudden, repetitive, and abrupt.

== See also ==
- Nonverbal communication
