= Woman Hating =

1974 book by Andrea Dworkin

Woman Hating: A Radical Look at Sexuality
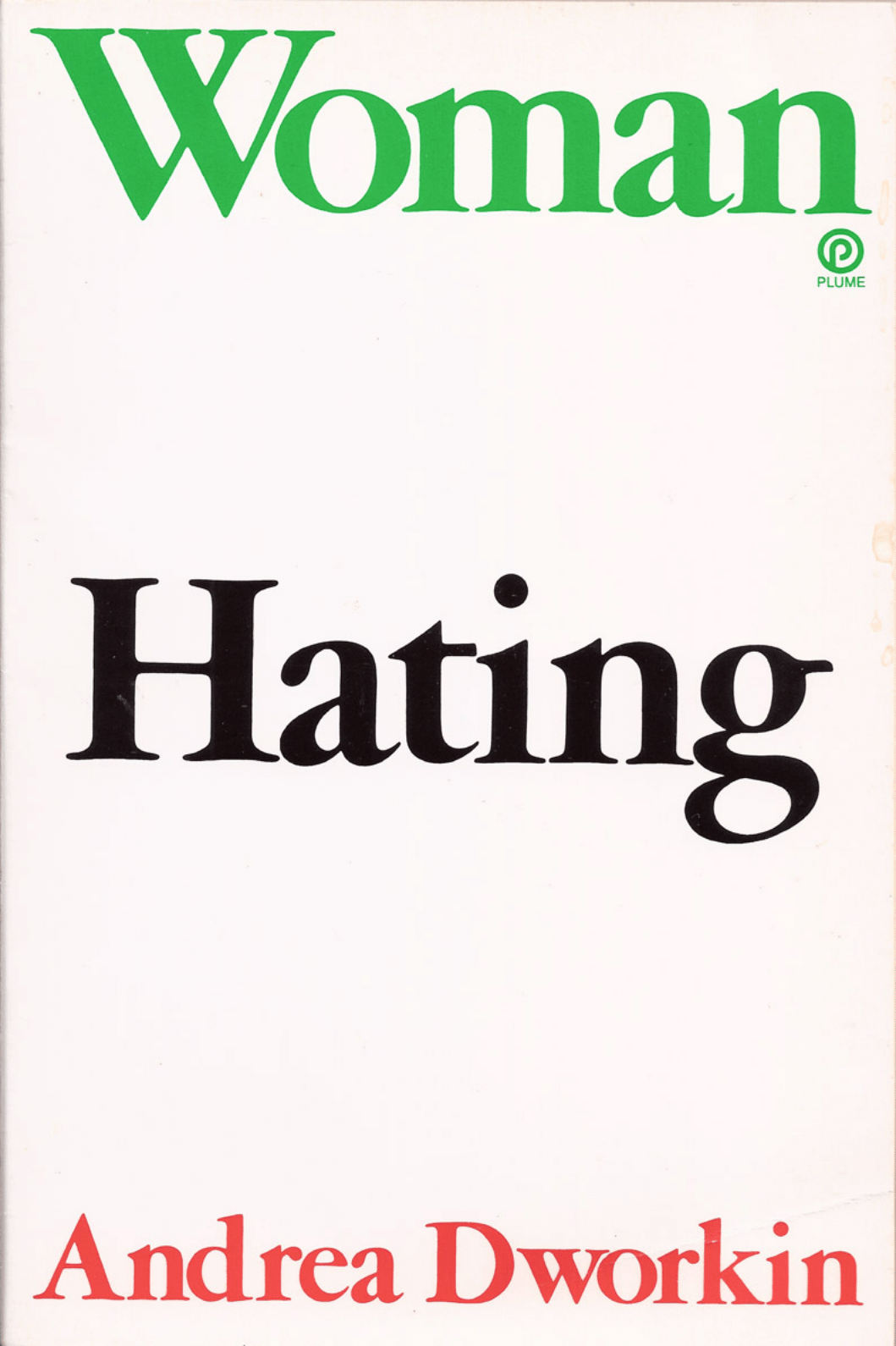
- Cover of the first edition
- Author: Andrea Dworkin
- Cover artist: Lawrence Ratzkin
- Language: English
- Subjects: Misogyny; sexuality
- Publisher: E. P. Dutton
- Publication date: 1974
- Publication place: United States
- Media type: Print
- Pages: 217
- ISBN: 0-525-47423-4
- OCLC: 648565982
- Dewey Decimal: 301.41/2
- LC Class: HQ

Woman Hating: A Radical Look at Sexuality is the debut nonfiction book by American radical feminist writer and activist Andrea Dworkin. It was first published in 1974 by E. P. Dutton.

The book examines how patriarchy and misogyny function throughout history, as well as practices pertaining to women and girls across different cultures, religions, and time periods. Dworkin writes about women in literature and history, arguing that certain ideas in these depictions, as well as depictions in pornography, have contributed to violence against women. She proposes her feminist view of biology and a restructuring of society.

== Background ==
While Dworkin was living in Amsterdam, she met Ricki Abrams, a feminist and fellow expatriate. Abrams introduced Dworkin to early radical feminist writing from the United States, and Dworkin was especially inspired by Kate Millett's Sexual Politics, Shulamith Firestone's The Dialectic of Sex, and Robin Morgan's Sisterhood Is Powerful. She and Abrams began to work together on "early pieces and fragments" of a radical feminist text on the hatred of women in culture and history, including a completed draft of a chapter on the pornographic counterculture magazine Suck, which was published by a group of fellow expatriates in the Netherlands.

Before Dworkin left Amsterdam, she spoke with Abrams about her experiences in the Netherlands, the emerging feminist movement, and the book they had begun to write together. Dworkin agreed to complete the book—which she eventually titled Woman Hating—and publish it when she reached the United States. In her memoirs, Dworkin relates that during that conversation she vowed to dedicate her life to the feminist movement:

Sitting with Ricki, talking with Ricki, I made a vow to her: that I would use everything I knew, including from prostitution, to make the women's movement stronger and better; that I'd give my life to the movement and for the movement. I promised to be honor-bound to the well-being of women, to do anything necessary for that well-being. I promised to live and to die if need be for women. I made that vow some thirty years ago, and I have not betrayed it yet.

— Andrea Dworkin, Heartbreak: The Political Memoir of a Feminist Militant, 122.

== Synopsis ==
Dworkin compares the place and depiction of women in fairy tales and pornography, focusing on the French erotic novels Story of O and The Image and the magazine Suck. She then looks at the historical practices of Chinese foot binding and medieval European witch burning from a radical feminist perspective. The book's final section discusses the concept of androgyny within various cultures' creation myths and argues for "the development of a new kind of human being and a new kind of human community" free from gender and gender roles.

Dworkin writes that practices like foot binding artificially created a situation in which the sexes were more physically different from each other, rather than formalizing a preexisting and natural difference. She argues a desirable alternative to this patriarchal perspective of the sexes would be "subsuming of traditional biology of sex difference into radical biology of sex similarity".

== Reception ==
Kirkus Reviews stated in April 1974 that Dworkin is "bright, entertaining and incisive when she is dissecting the roles available to men and women as articulated in fairy tales, Christian myths and contemporary pornography", and that "most of what she has to say is not nearly so preposterous."

Carol Sternhell praised Woman Hating in what was a largely negative May 1987 review, for The New York Times, of Dworkin's other books, Ice and Fire and Intercourse. Dworkin responded to this review in a letter to the editor: "I despair of being treated with respect, let alone fairly, in your pages. The review … is contemptuous beyond belief. … Thirteen years after its publication, your reviewer comments that "Woman Hating" is brilliant - thanks. And only four years after the publication of "Right-Wing Women," it too is called brilliant. Don't get ahead of yourselves. Neither book, by the way, was reviewed by The New York Times."

The New York Review of Books wrote in February 2019 that the book was "steeped in the anti-war, socialist vision of her countercultural milieu", "informed by the tactics and style of the Black Power movement", and contrary to "the moderate feminist agenda set by Betty Friedan and others, with its respectable focus on the professional advancement and civic engagement of white, heterosexual women." Jeremy Lybarger likewise wrote that month in the Boston Review that the book had "premiered the provocative style that endeared Dworkin to many radical feminists while alienating women who prioritized civility."

In May 2019, Momus wrote that in Woman Hating, "Dworkin effects an early appreciation of the role that intersectionality plays in feminist theory."

Dworkin's partner, John Stoltenberg, wrote in a 2020 Boston Review article that the book contained statements of support for trans people. He wrote that she "spoke to the present reality" for trans people "and evidenced her deep commitment to the right to have their identities affirmed and their medical needs supported by their communities. The empathy and acceptance Andrea wrote from in that passage never wavered." He added that the book challenged biological essentialist ideas, including gender essentialist ones. To the same end, in July 2022, Charlotte Proudman cited a quote present in the book from Dworkin's trans friend: "How can I really care if we win 'the Revolution'? Either way, any way, there will be no place for me."
