= Itzin =

Itzin is a surname. Notable people with the surname include:

- Catherine Itzin (1944–2010), American activist
- Gregory Itzin (1948–2022), American actor
