= John Stoltenberg =

American writer and activist (born 1944)

- Born: 1944 (age 81–82); California, U.S.
- Education: Union Theological Seminary (MDiv); Columbia University School of the Arts (MFA)
- Occupations: Writer; activist
- Movement: Radical feminism; Anti-pornography feminism
- Spouses: Andrea Dworkin (m. 1998; died 2005); Joe Hamilton (m. 2010)

Academic background
- Influences: Andrea Dworkin

John Stoltenberg (born 1944) is an American writer who identifies his political perspective as radical feminist. For several years he has worked for DC Metro Theater Arts and as of 2019 is its executive editor. He has written three books, two collections of his essays and a novel.

He was the life partner of Andrea Dworkin for 30 years and has lived with his husband, Joe Hamilton, for over 15 years.

== Education and career ==
Stoltenberg studied philosophy, focusing on the philosophy of religion. He holds a Master of Divinity from Union Theological Seminary and a Master of Fine Arts in Theatre Arts from Columbia University School of the Arts. In undergraduate and graduate school, he began writing, producing, directing, and acting in plays. Upon graduation, he became the writer-in-residence and administrative director for the influential experimental theater company The Open Theater, whose artistic director was Joseph Chaikin. Meanwhile, Stoltenberg's own plays were produced off-Broadway, and he won a New York State Arts Council grant to be a playwright.

In the 1980s, John began his career as a magazine editor. He worked as the managing editor at Essence, Working Woman, Lear's, and later AARP: The Magazine. Stoltenberg serves as executive editor and Communications Advisor for DC Metro Theater Arts, where he publishes theater reviews, interviews, and essays about live theater in Washington, D.C. In 2015, John produced a one-woman play titled Aftermath, which was an edited version of an unpublished essay by Andrea Dworkin. It was edited and directed for the stage by Adam Thorburn.

== Writings ==
Stoltenberg has written many essays and speeches, as well as a novel, reflecting his pro-feminist sexual politics. Several appeared in the book For Men Against Sexism: A Book of Readings (1977): "Refusing to Be a Man", "Toward Gender Justice", and "Eroticism and Violence in the Father-Son Relationship".

In 1989, he published a collection of his essays, Refusing to Be a Man: Essays on Sex and Justice. Lesbian author Rita Mae Brown stated the book carefully identifies the process by which male identification "affects and distorts men's most intimate capacities." This was followed in 1993 by a second collection The End of Manhood: A Book for Men of Conscience.

In 2013, he published the novel GONERZ. He has stated the writings of Andrea Dworkin have been the inspiration for his own and he dedicated all three books to her. His work is included in several anthologies including Feminism and Men: Reconstructing Gender Relations and The New Politics of Masculinity: Men, Power and Resistance. Stoltenberg has been credited with the quote: "Pornography tells lies about women. But pornography tells the truth about men."

== Personal life ==
Born and raised in Minnesota, in his early life John was married to a woman and lived within traditional marital roles. After that, John has lived as an out gay man who also uses the term queer. He chose to spend his life with the radical feminist and lesbian, Andrea Dworkin. They were introduced by a mutual friend, a theater director, in 1974, at a meeting of the then-fledgling Gay Academic Union. Later in 1974, after walking out of a poetry reading—a benefit for the War Resisters League in Greenwich Village—due to the misogynist content, they began their decades-long intellectual and personal relationship.

Their agreement was that while they would always live together, they could have relationships outside of their partnership and John did have relationships with men. John and Andrea planned never to marry unless one of two things occurred. As Andrea stated to The New York Times in 1985, "unless one of us is terminally ill or jailed for political activity", as she had been at the Women's House of Detention in New York at the age of eighteen. While they intended for the 1985 article to make clear they were not heterosexual, the "editor refused to allow the writer to identify us as gay and lesbian, as we had asked." They married in 1998, due to her ill health.

In 2005 Dworkin died from an enlarged heart. Since then, John has lived with his husband, Joe Hamilton, in Washington, D.C.

See also Andrea Dworkin § Relationship with John Stoltenberg.

== Activism ==
In addition to joining Dworkin in marches to protest against pornography, Stoltenberg founded Men Against Pornography in New York City, the male branch of Women Against Pornography. In the mid-'80s, he created and facilitated "The Pose Workshop", which entailed clothed men adopting the poses that women strike in pornographic shots with direction from other attendees, a version of which was broadcast on BBC television. He used that as an empathy-builder with young men on college campuses and at anti-sexist men's conferences across the US.

He was a founder of the group Men Can Stop Rape and developed the group's “My Strength” poster campaign which aims to educate young men on sexual relationships, consent, and rape.

He is also the creative director of the group's "My Duty" sexual-assault-prevention media campaign, which is licensed to the United States Department of Defense's Sexual Assault Prevention and Response Office.

Stoltenberg has voiced his support for transgender rights, and argued in 2020 that Dworkin was a transgender ally.

== Selected publications ==
=== Books ===
- Disarmament and masculinity: An outline guide and bibliography for studying the connection between sexual violence and war. Palo Alto, California: Frog in the Well. 1978.
- Refusing to be a man: essays on sex and justice. Portland, Oregon: Breitenbush Books. 1989. ISBN 9780932576736. Reprinted as: Refusing to be a man: essays on sex and justice. UCL Press. 2000. ISBN 9781841420417.
- The end of manhood: a book for men of conscience. New York: Plume. 1994. ISBN 9780452273047. 2nd ed.: The end of manhood: a book for men of conscience. Bridgewater, New Jersey: Replica Books. 1998. ISBN 9780735100404. Reprinted as: The end of manhood: parables on sex and selfhood. UCL Press. 2000. ISBN 9781857283259.
- What makes pornography "sexy". Minneapolis: Milkweed Editions. 1994. ISBN 9781571312013.
- Gonerz. CreateSpace Independent Publishing Platform. 2013. ISBN 978-1481986472.

=== Book chapters ===
- "Refusing to be a man", "Toward gender justice", and "Eroticism and violence in the father-son relationship", in Snodgrass, John, ed. (1977), For men against sexism: a book of readings, Monthly Review Press, ISBN 9780878100316
- "Sadomasochism: Eroticized violence, eroticized powerlessness", in Russell, Diana E. H.; Star, Susan L.; Linden, Robin R.; Pagano, Darlene R., eds. (1982), Against sadomasochism: a radical feminist analysis, East Palo Alto, California: Frog in the Well, ISBN 9780960362837
- "Other men", in Abbott, Franklin, ed. (1987), New men, new minds: breaking male tradition: how today's men are changing the traditional roles of masculinity, Freedom, California: Crossing Press, ISBN 9780895942197
- "Pornography and freedom" and "Gays and the propornography movement: having the hots for sex discrimination", in Kimmel, Michael S., ed. (1990), Men confront pornography, New York: Crown Publishers, ISBN 9780517569313
- "You can't fight homophobia and protect the pornographers at the same time: an analysis of what went wrong in Hardwick", in Leidholdt, Dorchen; Raymond, Janice G., eds. (1990), The sexual liberals and the attack on feminism, New York: Pergamon Press, ISBN 9780080374574
- "Pornography, homophobia and male supremacy", in Itzin, Catherine, ed. (1992), Pornography: women, violence, and civil liberties, Oxford University Press, ISBN 9780198257554
- "Making rape an election issue", in Buchwald, Emilie; Fletcher, Pamela R.; Roth, Martha, eds. (1993), Transforming a rape culture, Milkweed Editions, ISBN 9781571312044. Reprinted in 2nd ed. (2005), ISBN 9781571312693
- "Pornography and freedom", in Russell, Diana E. H., ed. (1993), Making violence sexy: feminist views on pornography, Open University Press and Teachers College Press, ISBN 9780335192007
- "The triangular politics of pornography", in Lederer, Laura; Delgado, Richard, eds. (1995), The price we pay: the case against racist speech, hate propaganda, and pornography, New York City: Hill & Wang, ISBN 9780809078837
- "Pornography and sexual violence: justice and accountability to victims", in Burgonio-Watson, Thelma; et al., eds. (1995), Called to make justice: collected keynote speeches from the first bi-national meeting of advocates, workers and leaders from religious communities who work to prevent sexual and domestic violence, Seattle, Washington: Center for the Prevention of Sexual and Domestic Violence
- "'I am not a rapist!': Why college guys are confronting sexual violence" and "Healing from manhood: a radical meditation on the movement from gender identity to moral identity", in Schacht, Steven P.; Ewing, Doris W., eds. (1998), Feminism and men: reconstructing gender relations, New York University Press, ISBN 9780814780848
- "Learning the F words", in Atkins, Dawn, ed. (1998), Looking queer: body image and identity in lesbian, bisexual, gay, and transgender communities, New York: Haworth Press, ISBN 9781560239314
- "How power makes men: the grammar of gender identity", in Kuypers, Joseph A., ed. (1999), Men and power, Amherst, New York: Prometheus Books, ISBN 9781573927697
- "Introduction", in Wild, Jim, ed. (1999), Working with men for change, UCL Press, ISBN 9781857288612
- "Christianity, feminism, and the manhood crisis", in Claussen, Dane S., ed. (1999), Standing on the promises: the Promise Keepers and the revival of manhood, Cleveland: Pilgrim Press, ISBN 9780829813074
- "Top ten ways the campus movement against sexual violence is misunderstood", in Gold, Jodi; Villari, Susan, eds. (2000), Just sex: students rewrite the rules on sex, violence, activism, and equality, Lanham, Maryland: Rowman & Littlefield, ISBN 9780847693320
- "Having sex outside the box", in Kay, Kerwin; Nagle, Jill; Gould, Baruch, eds. (2000), Male lust: pleasure, power, and transformation, New York: Harrington Park Press, ISBN 9781560239826
- "Feminists should oppose pornography", in Cothran, Helen, ed. (2002), Pornography: opposing viewpoints, Opposing Viewpoints series, San Diego: Greenhaven Press, ISBN 9780737707601
- "How men have (a) sex", in O'Connor, Peg; Heldke, Lisa, eds. (2004), Oppression, privilege, and resistance: theoretical perspectives on racism, sexism, and heterosexism, Boston: McGraw-Hill, ISBN 9780072882438
- "Pornography and international human rights", in Whisnant, Rebecca; Stark, Christine, eds. (2004), Not for sale: feminists resisting prostitution and pornography, North Melbourne: Spinifex Press, ISBN 9781876756499
- "Confronting pornography as a civil-rights issue", in Hackett, Elizabeth; Haslanger, Sally, eds. (2006), Theorizing feminisms: a reader, Oxford University Press, ISBN 9780195150094
- "Foreword", in Kendall, Christopher; Martino, Wayne, eds. (2006), Gendered outcasts and sexual outlaws: sexual oppression and gender hierarchies in queer men's lives, New York: Harrington Park Press, ISBN 9781560235019
- "The politics of refusal", in Ashe, Fidelma, ed. (2011), The new politics of masculinity: men, power and resistance, London: Routledge, ISBN 9780415663700
- "The civil-rights approach to pornography", in Earp, Brian D.; Chambers, Clare; Watson, Lori, eds. (2022), The Routledge handbook of philosophy of sex and sexuality, New York: Routledge, ISBN 9781138370678

=== Journal articles ===
- "Male sexuality: why ownership is sexy". Michigan Journal of Gender and Law. 1 (1). 1993.
- "Why I stopped trying to be a real man". Feminista!. 1 (2). 1994.
- "Male virgins, blood covenants & family values". On the Issues: The Progressive Woman's Quarterly. Spring 1995.
- "Of microbes and manhood". Ms. 10 (5). August–September 2000.
