= Intercourse (book) =

1987 book by Andrea Dworkin

- Cover of the first edition
- Author: Andrea Dworkin
- Language: English
- Subject: Sexual intercourse
- Publisher: Free Press
- Publication date: 1987
- Publication place: United States
- Media type: Print (hardcover and paperback)
- Pages: 257
- ISBN: 0-684-83239-9
- OCLC: 37625851
- Dewey Decimal: 306.7
- LC Class: HQ

Intercourse is the fifth non-fiction book by American radical feminist writer and activist Andrea Dworkin. It was first published in 1987 by Free Press. In Intercourse, Dworkin presents a radical feminist analysis of sexual intercourse in literature and society.

She is often said to argue that "all heterosexual sex is rape", based on the line from the book that says, "Violation is a synonym for intercourse." However, Dworkin has denied this interpretation, stating, "What I think is that sex must not put women in a subordinate position. It must be reciprocal and not an act of aggression from a man looking only to satisfy himself. That's my point."

== Thesis ==
In Intercourse, Dworkin extended her earlier analysis of pornography to a discussion of heterosexual intercourse itself. In works such as Woman Hating (1974) and Pornography: Men Possessing Women (1981), Dworkin argued that pornography (this includes erotic literature) in patriarchal societies consistently eroticized women's sexual subordination to men and often overt acts of exploitation or violence. In Intercourse, she went on to argue that that sort of sexual subordination was central to men's and women's experiences of sexual intercourse in a male supremacist society and reinforced throughout mainstream culture, including not only pornography but also classic works of male-centric literature.

Extensively discussing works such as The Kreutzer Sonata (1889), Madame Bovary (1856), and Dracula (1897), and citing religious texts, legal commentary, and pornography, Dworkin argued that the depictions of intercourse in mainstream art and culture consistently emphasized heterosexual intercourse as the only or the most genuine form of "real" sex; that they portrayed intercourse in violent or invasive terms; that they portrayed the violence or invasiveness as central to its eroticism; and that they often united it with male contempt for, revulsion towards, or even murder of the "carnal" woman. She argued that this kind of depiction enforced a male-centric and coercive view of sexuality and that, when the cultural attitudes combine with the material conditions of women's lives in a sexist society, the experience of heterosexual intercourse itself becomes a central part of men's subordination of women, experienced as a form of "occupation" that is nevertheless expected to be pleasurable for women and to define their very status as women.

In the 1998 book, Without Apology: Andrea Dworkin's Art and Politics, in chapter 6, titled "Intercourse: An Institution of Male Power", author Cindy Jenefsky states, "As in her analysis of pornography's sexual subordination, the key to understanding Dworkin's analysis of sexual intercourse rests on recognizing how she integrates the individual act of sexual intercourse within its larger social context. She produces a materialist analysis that examines sexual intercourse as an institutionalized practice."

== Controversy ==
It is frequently claimed by Dworkin's critics, citing Intercourse, that she wrote, "All heterosexual intercourse is rape." Supporters point out that this statement is not found in the book. Furthermore, the comparisons of intercourse to "occupation", "possession", "collaboration", etc. are made in the context of discussions of the way in which intercourse is depicted in "the discourse of male truth—literature, science, philosophy, pornography", and the enforcement of those terms through men's social power over women.

Dworkin's rejection of the interpretation that "all heterosexual intercourse is rape" is regarded by some observers as proof that such an interpretation is a grave misunderstanding or misrepresentation of her work. Her followers cite an interview with editor, critic, and writer Michael Moorcock for the New Statesman & Society, in which Dworkin claimed, "In Intercourse I decided to approach the subject as a social practice, material reality. This may be my history, but I think the social explanation of the 'all sex is rape' slander is different and probably simple. Most men and a good number of women experience sexual pleasure in inequality. Since the paradigm for sex has been one of conquest, possession, and violation, I think many men believe they need an unfair advantage, which at its extreme would be called rape. I don't think they need it. I think both intercourse and sexual pleasure can and will survive equality."

Journalist Cathy Young wrote that she found Dworkin's explanation hard to square with what Young described as Dworkin's frequent willingness to criticize ordinary heterosexual practices as violent or coercive. Young wrote, "whatever her defenders say, Dworkin was anti-sex."

Following Dworkin's death in 2005, Katharine Viner interviewed Dworkin's friend, art critic, writer, and painter John Berger. The article, published in The Guardian, was titled "'She Never Hated Men'":

John Berger once called Dworkin 'the most misrepresented writer in the western world'. She has always been seen as the woman who said that all men are rapists, and that all sex is rape. In fact, she said neither of these things. Here's what she told me in 1997: 'If you believe that what people call normal sex is an act of dominance, where a man desires a woman so much that he will use force against her to express his desire, if you believe that's romantic, that's the truth about sexual desire, then if someone denounces force in sex it sounds like they're denouncing sex.'

== Reviews ==
- Sternhell, Carol (May 3, 1987). "Ice and Fire by Andrea Dworkin; Intercourse by Andrea Dworkin. "Male and Female, Men and Women"". The New York Times.
  - Reply: Dworkin, Andrea (May 24, 1987). "Reviewing Andrea Dworkin (letter to editor)". The New York Times.
    - Following response: MacKinnon, Catharine (June 14, 1987). "Dworkin's Arguments (letter to editor)". The New York Times.
    - Following response: Daly, Mary (June 14, 1987). "Dworkin's Arguments (letter to editor)". The New York Times.
    - Reviewer's reply: Sternhell, Carol (June 14, 1987). "Dworkin's Arguments (letter to editor)". The New York Times.
- Mullarkey, Maureen (May 30, 1987). "Intercourse by Andrea Dworkin; Feminism Unmodified by Catharine MacKinnon. "Porn in the U.S.A., Part I". The Nation.
- Villar, Giney (1998). "Intercourse by Andrea Dworkin — Tenth Anniversary Edition (1997)". Women in Action.
