= Dawn Atkins =

Dawn Atkins may refer to:

- Dawn Atkins (romantic novelist), American author of contemporary romance novels
- Dawn Atkins (anthropologist) (born 1962), American author, activist and educator
