= Andrea Dworkin =

American feminist writer and activist (1946–2005)

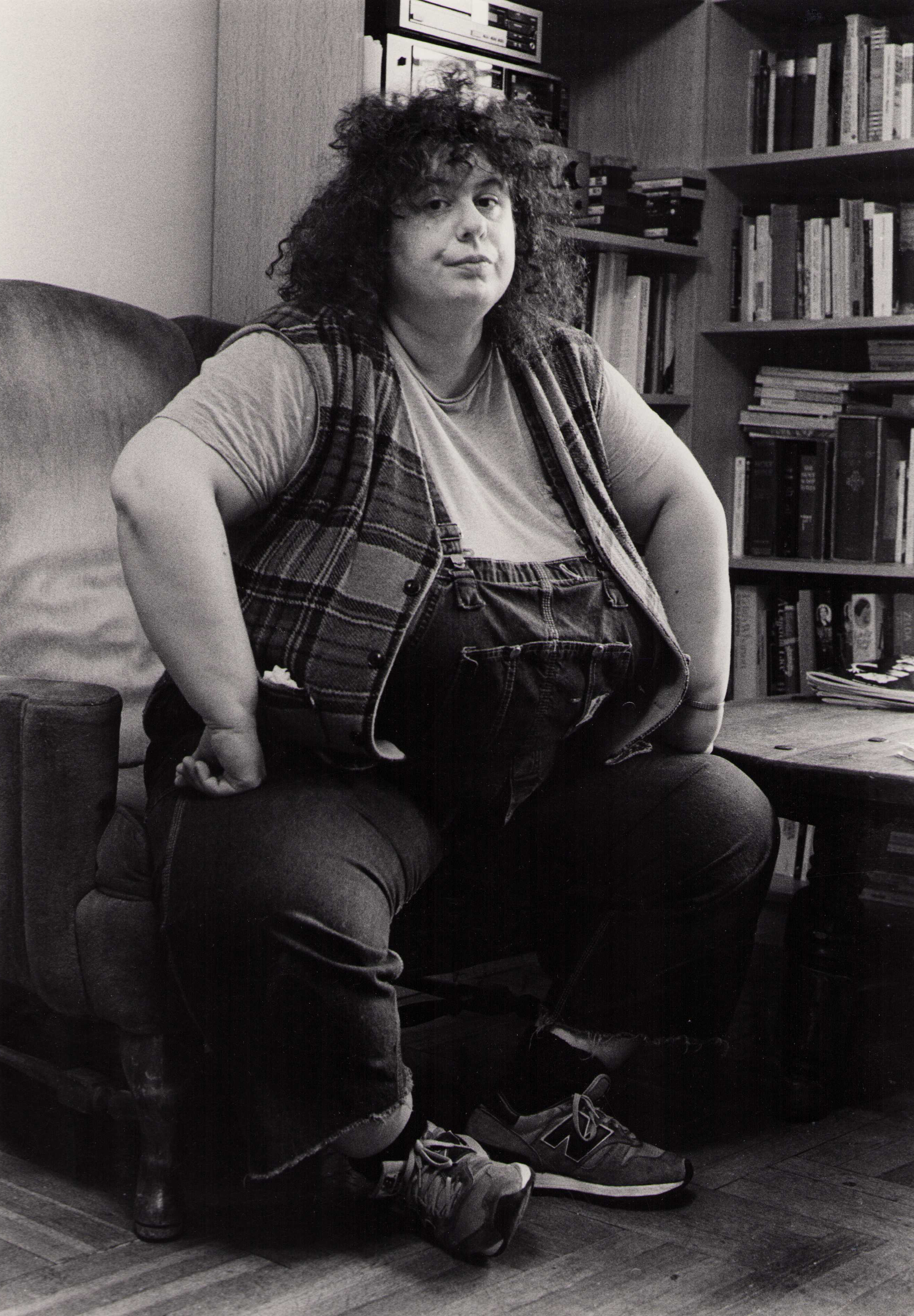
- Dworkin photographed by Mary Motley Kalergis in 1985
- Born: Andrea Rita Dworkin; September 26, 1946; Camden, New Jersey, U.S.
- Died: April 9, 2005 (aged 58); Washington, D.C., U.S.
- Education: Bennington College (BA)
- Occupations: Writer; activist
- Years active: 1966–2005
- Notable work: Woman Hating (1974); Pornography (1981); Intercourse (1987)
- Movement: Radical feminism; Anti-pornography feminism; Anti-prostitution feminism
- Spouses: Cornelius Dirk de Bruin (m. 1969; div. 1976); John Stoltenberg (m. 1998)
- Website: andreadworkin.com

Andrea Rita Dworkin (September 26, 1946 – April 9, 2005) was an American radical feminist writer and activist best known for her analysis of pornography. Her feminist writings, beginning in 1974, span 30 years. They are found in a dozen solo works: nine books of non-fiction, two novels, and a collection of short stories. Another three volumes were co-written or co-edited with US constitutional law professor and feminist activist Catharine A. MacKinnon.

The central objective of Dworkin's work is analyzing Western society, culture, and politics through the prism of men's sexual violence against women in a patriarchal context. She wrote on a wide range of topics including the lives of Joan of Arc, Margaret Papandreou, and Nicole Brown Simpson; she analyzed the literature of Charlotte Brontë, Jean Rhys, Leo Tolstoy, Marquis de Sade, Kōbō Abe, Tennessee Williams, James Baldwin, and Isaac Bashevis Singer; she brought her own radical feminist perspective to her examination of subjects historically written or described from men's point of view, including fairy tales, homosexuality, lesbianism, virginity, antisemitism, the State of Israel, the Holocaust, biological superiority, and racism. She interrogated premises underlying concepts such as freedom of the press and civil liberties. She theorized the sexual politics of intelligence, fear, courage, and integrity. She described a male supremacist political ideology manifesting in and constituted by rape, battery, prostitution, and pornography.

== Biography ==
=== Early life ===
Andrea Dworkin was born on September 26, 1946, in Camden, New Jersey, to Harry Dworkin and Sylvia Spiegel. Her father was the grandson of a Russian Jew who fled Russia when he was 15 years old in order to escape military service, and her mother was the child of Jewish immigrants from Hungary. She had one younger brother, Mark. Her father was a school teacher and dedicated socialist, whom she credited with inspiring her passion for social justice. Her relationship with her mother was strained, but Dworkin later wrote that her mother's belief in legal birth control and abortion, "long before these were respectable beliefs", inspired her later activism.

Though she described her Jewish household as being in many ways dominated by the memory of the Holocaust, it nonetheless provided a happy childhood until she reached the age of nine, when an unknown man molested her in a movie theater. When Dworkin was ten, her family moved from the city to the suburbs of Cherry Hill, New Jersey (then known as Delaware Township), which she later wrote she "experienced as being kidnapped by aliens and taken to a penal colony". In sixth grade, the administration at her new school punished her for refusing to sing "Silent Night" (as a Jew, she objected to being forced to sing Christian religious songs at school). She said she "probably would have become a rabbi" if women could have while she was in high school and she "would have liked" being a Talmudic scholar.

Dworkin began writing poetry and fiction in the sixth grade. Around that time, she was undecided about whether to become a lawyer or a writer, because of her interest then in abortion, and chose writing because she could "do it in a room alone" and "nobody could stop me". Throughout high school, she read avidly, with encouragement from her parents. She was particularly influenced by Arthur Rimbaud, Charles Baudelaire, Henry Miller, Fyodor Dostoevsky, Che Guevara, and the Beat poets, especially Allen Ginsberg, and has included among writers she "admired most" Jean Genet, Percy Bysshe Shelley, and Lord Byron. She graduated in 1964 from what is now Cherry Hill High School West.

=== College and early activism ===
In 1965, while a freshman at Bennington College, Dworkin was arrested during an anti-Vietnam War protest at the United States Mission to the United Nations and sent to the New York Women's House of Detention. After writing to the Commissioner of Corrections Anna Cross, Dworkin testified that the doctors in the House of Detention gave her an internal examination which was so rough that she bled for days afterwards. She spoke in public and testified before a grand jury about her experience, and the media coverage of her testimony made national and international news. The grand jury declined to make an indictment in the case, but Dworkin's testimony contributed to public outrage over the mistreatment of inmates. The prison was closed seven years later.

Soon after testifying before the grand jury, Dworkin left Bennington College on the ocean liner Castel Felice to live in Greece and to pursue her writing. She traveled from Paris to Athens on the Orient Express, and went to live and write on the island of Crete. While there, she wrote a series of poems titled (Vietnam) Variations, a collection of poems and prose poems that she printed on the island in a book called Child (1965), and a novel in a style resembling magical realism called Notes on Burning Boyfriend—a reference to Norman Morrison, a pacifist who had burned himself to death in protest of the Vietnam War. She also wrote several poems and dialogues which she hand-printed after returning to the United States; these became the book Morning Hair (1967).

After living in Crete, Dworkin returned to Bennington College for two years, where she continued to study literature and participated in campaigns against the college's student conduct code, for contraception on campus, for the legalization of abortion, and against the Vietnam War. She graduated with a Bachelor's degree in literature in 1968.

=== Life in the Netherlands ===
After graduation, Dworkin moved to Amsterdam to interview Dutch anarchists in the Provo movement, which used theatrical street happenings to instigate change. While there, she became involved with one of the anarchists, Cornelius (Iwan) Dirk de Bruin, and they married. Soon after, she says that De Bruin began to abuse her severely, punching and kicking her, burning her with cigarettes, beating her on her legs with a wooden beam, and banging her head against the floor until he knocked her unconscious.

After she left De Bruin late in 1971, Dworkin said her ex-husband attacked, persecuted, and harassed her, beating her and threatening her whenever he found where she was hiding. She found herself desperate for money, often homeless, thousands of miles from her family, later remarking: "I often lived the life of a fugitive, except that it was the more desperate life of a battered woman who had run away for the last time, whatever the outcome." Due to poverty, Dworkin turned to prostitution for a period. Ricki Abrams, a feminist and fellow expatriate, sheltered Dworkin in her home and helped her find places to stay on houseboats, a communal farm, and in deserted buildings. Dworkin tried to work up the money to return to the United States.

Abrams introduced Dworkin to early radical feminist writing from the United States, and Dworkin was notably inspired by Kate Millett's Sexual Politics, Shulamith Firestone's The Dialectic of Sex, and Robin Morgan's Sisterhood Is Powerful. She and Abrams began to work together on "early pieces and fragments" of a radical feminist text on the hatred of women in culture and history, including a completed draft of a chapter on the pornographic counterculture magazine Suck, which was published by a group of fellow expatriates in the Netherlands.

Dworkin later wrote that she eventually agreed to help smuggle a briefcase of heroin through customs in return for $1,000 and an airplane ticket, thinking that if she was successful she could return home with the ticket and the money, and if caught she would at least escape her ex-husband's abuse by going to prison. The deal for the briefcase fell through, but the man who had promised Dworkin the money gave her the airline ticket anyway, and she returned to the United States in 1972.

Before she left Amsterdam, Dworkin spoke with Abrams about her experiences in the Netherlands, the emerging feminist movement, and the book they had begun to write together. Dworkin agreed to complete the book—which she eventually titled Woman Hating—and publish it when she reached the United States. In her memoirs, Dworkin relates that during that conversation, she vowed to dedicate her life to the feminist movement:

Sitting with Ricki, talking with Ricki, I made a vow to her: that I would use everything I knew, including from prostitution, to make the women's movement stronger and better; that I'd give my life to the movement and for the movement. I promised to be honor-bound to the well-being of women, to do anything necessary for that well-being. I promised to live and to die if need be for women. I made that vow some thirty years ago, and I have not betrayed it yet.

=== Return to New York and contact with the feminist movement ===
In New York City, Dworkin worked again as an anti-war organizer, participated in demonstrations for lesbian rights and against apartheid in South Africa. The feminist poet Muriel Rukeyser hired her as an assistant. Dworkin later said, "I was the worst assistant in the history of the world. But Muriel kept me on because she believed in me as a writer." Dworkin also joined a feminist consciousness raising group, and soon became involved in radical feminist organizing, focusing on campaigns against men's violence against women. In addition to her writing and activism, Dworkin gained notoriety as a speaker, mostly for events organized by local feminist groups. She became well known for passionate, uncompromising speeches that aroused strong feelings in both supporters and critics, and inspired her audience to action, such as her speech at the first organizational Take Back the Night march in November 1978 (led by WAVPM), and her 1983 speech at the Midwest Regional Conference of the National Organization for Changing Men (now the National Organization for Men Against Sexism) titled "I Want a Twenty-Four Hour Truce During Which There Is No Rape."

=== Relationship with John Stoltenberg ===
In 1974, Dworkin and John Stoltenberg were introduced by a mutual friend, a theater director, at a meeting of the then-fledgling Gay Academic Union. Later in 1974, not attending together, they both walked out of a poetry reading—a benefit for the War Resisters League in Greenwich Village—due to the misogynist content. It was then they began their decades-long intellectual and personal relationship. Moving in together, their agreement was that while they would always live together, they could have relationships outside of their partnership. They planned never to marry unless one of two things occurred: as Dworkin stated to the New York Times in 1985, "unless one of us is terminally ill or jailed for political activity." About that piece, Stoltenberg said the "editor refused to allow the writer to identify us as gay and lesbian, as we had asked." They married in 1998 due to her ill health, specifically painful osteoarthritis. Their life of thirty-one years together ended in April 2005 with Dworkin's sudden death from heart disease, an enlarged heart. Since then, he has lived with his husband in Washington, D.C.

In Martin Duberman's biography, Andrea Dworkin: the Feminist as Revolutionary, Stoltenberg is quoted describing the sexual dimension of their relationship. Dworkin's relationship with a woman, Joanne, was unwinding through the last half of the decade, and Stoltenberg maintained gay relationships with men throughout their time together.

Stoltenberg began writing a series of essays, books, and articles examining manhood and masculinity from a radical feminist perspective. Although Dworkin publicly wrote, "I love John with my heart and soul," and Stoltenberg described Dworkin as "the love of my life," she continued to publicly identify herself as lesbian, and he as gay. Stoltenberg, recounting the perplexity that their relationship seemed to cause people in the press, summarized the relationship by saying, "So I state only the simplest facts publicly: yes, Andrea and I live together and love each other and we are each other's life partner, and yes we are both out."

=== Later life ===
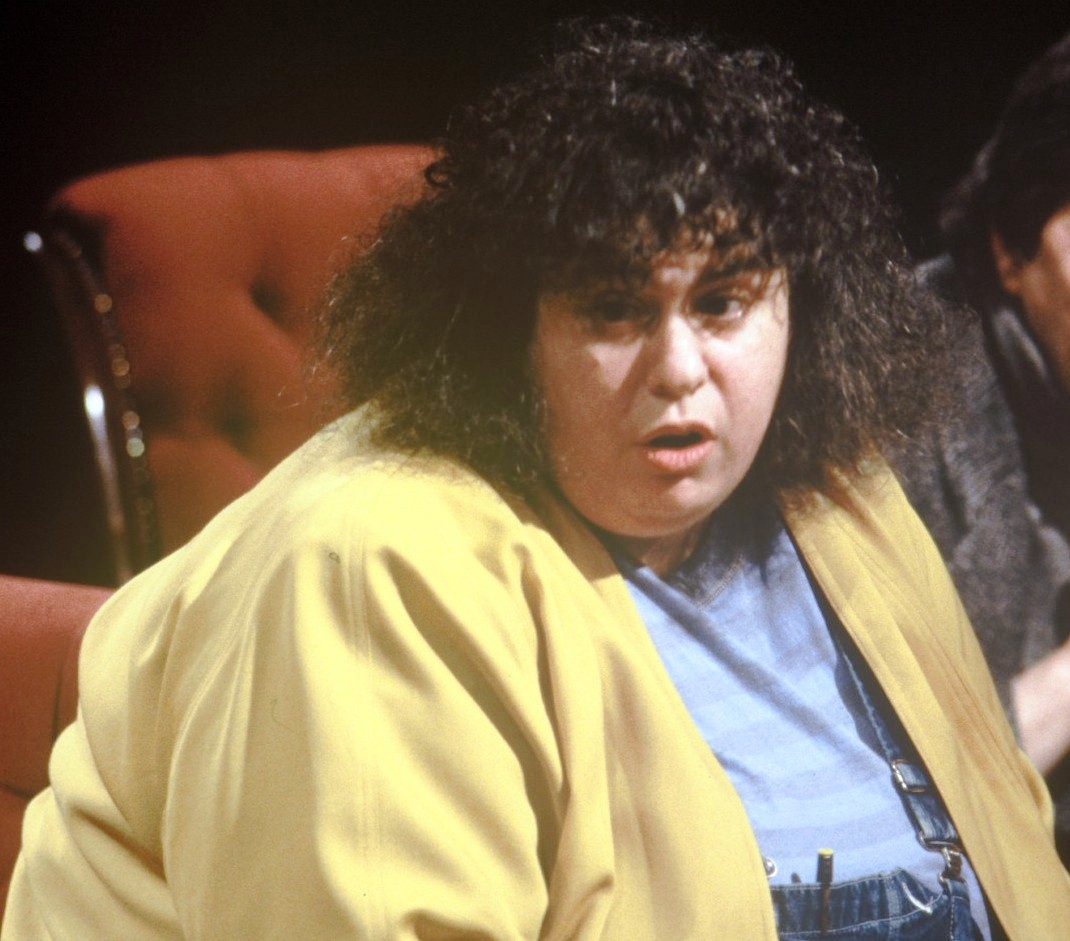
Dworkin on the 1988 British television discussion programme After Dark: "What is Sex For?"

From 1974 through 1983, Dworkin wrote prolifically, producing four volumes developing her overall thesis about the practice, meaning, and function of patriarchal, misogynist violence. In 1977, she became an associate of the Women's Institute for Freedom of the Press. Between 1985 and 1997, she produced eight more books: three of them with Catharine A. MacKinnon either as co-author or editor and two collections of formerly unpublished essays and speeches. Her two final books came out in the first years of the 21st century, the latter being a memoir.

Dworkin was a strong opponent of President Bill Clinton and Hillary Clinton during the scandal centered on his behavior toward Monica Lewinsky, whom she supported. She also expressed support for Paula Jones and Juanita Broaddrick.

In June 2000, she published Scapegoat: The Jews, Israel, and Women's Liberation, in which she compared the oppression of women to the persecution of Jews, discussed the sexual politics of Jewish identity and antisemitism, and called for the establishment of a women's homeland as a response to the oppression of women.

Also that same month, Dworkin published articles in the New Statesman and in The Guardian, stating that one or more men had raped her in her hotel room in Paris the previous year, putting GHB in her drink to disable her. Her articles ignited public controversy when writers such as Catherine Bennett and Julia Gracen published doubts about her account, polarizing opinion between skeptics and supporters such as Catharine MacKinnon, Katharine Viner, and Gloria Steinem. Her reference to the incident was later described by Charlotte Raven as a "widely disbelieved claim", better seen as "a kind of artistic housekeeping." Emotionally fragile and in failing health, Dworkin mostly withdrew from public life for two years following the articles.

In 2002, Dworkin published her autobiography, Heartbreak: The Political Memoir of a Feminist Militant. She soon began to speak and write again, and in an interview with Julie Bindel in 2004 said, "I thought I was finished, but I feel a new vitality. I want to continue to help women." She published three more articles in The Guardian and began work on a new book, Writing America: How Novelists Invented and Gendered a Nation, on the role of novelists such as Ernest Hemingway, Zora Neale Hurston, William Faulkner, and Eudora Welty in the development of American political and cultural identity, which was left unfinished when she died. Dworkin's outline and proposal for the book was made public on June 15, 2022.

=== Illness and death ===
During her final years, Dworkin suffered fragile health, and she revealed in her last column for The Guardian that she had been weakened and disabled for the past several years by her weight and severe osteoarthritis in the knees. Shortly after returning from Paris in 1999, she had been hospitalized with a high fever and blood clots in her legs. A few months after being released from the hospital, she became increasingly unable to bend her knees, and underwent surgery to replace her knees with titanium and plastic prosthetics. She wrote, "The doctor who knows me best says that osteoarthritis begins long before it cripples—in my case, possibly from homelessness, or sexual abuse, or beatings on my legs, or my weight. John, my partner, blames Scapegoat, a study of Jewish identity and women's liberation that took me nine years to write; it is, he says, the book that stole my health. I blame the drug-rape that I experienced in 1999 in Paris." When a newspaper interviewer asked her how she would like to be remembered, she said, "In a museum, when male supremacy is dead. I'd like my work to be an anthropological artifact from an extinct, primitive society."

She died in her sleep at her home in Washington, D.C., on April 9, 2005, at the age of 58. The cause of death was later determined to be acute myocarditis.

== Anti-pornography activism ==
Dworkin was a speaker, writer, and activist in the feminist anti-pornography movement. In February 1976, she took a leading role in organizing public pickets of Snuff in New York City and, during the fall, joined Adrienne Rich, Grace Paley, Gloria Steinem, Shere Hite, Lois Gould, Barbara Deming, Karla Jay, Letty Cottin Pogrebin, Robin Morgan, and Susan Brownmiller in attempts to form a radical feminist antipornography group. Members of this group would go on to found Women Against Pornography in 1979, but by then Dworkin had begun to distance herself from the group over differences in approach. She spoke at a Take Back the Night march in November 1978, joining 3,000 women in a march through the red-light district of San Francisco.

In 1981, Dworkin published Pornography: Men Possessing Women, which analyzes contemporary and historical pornography as an industry of misogynistic dehumanization. She argues that pornography is implicated in violence against women, both in its production (through the abuse of the women used to star in it), and in the social consequences of its consumption by encouraging men to eroticize the domination, humiliation, and abuse of women. Dworkin, who joined The American Heritage Dictionary's Usage Panel, also argued in Pornography that this denigration of women is built into linguistic norms.

=== Anti-pornography Civil Rights Ordinance ===
In 1980, Linda Boreman (who had appeared in the pornographic film Deep Throat as "Linda Lovelace") made public statements that her ex-husband Chuck Traynor had beaten and raped her, and violently coerced her into making that and other pornographic films. Boreman made her charges public for the press corps at a press conference, with Dworkin, feminist lawyer Catharine MacKinnon, and members of Women Against Pornography. After the press conference, Dworkin, MacKinnon, Gloria Steinem, and Boreman began discussing the possibility of using federal civil rights law to seek damages from Traynor and the makers of Deep Throat. Boreman was interested, but backed off after Steinem discovered that the statute of limitations for a possible suit had passed.

Dworkin and MacKinnon, however, continued to discuss civil rights litigation as a possible approach to combating pornography. In the fall of 1983, MacKinnon secured a one-semester appointment for Dworkin at the University of Minnesota, to teach a course in literature for the Women's Studies program and co-teach (with MacKinnon) an interdepartmental course on pornography, where they hashed out details of a civil rights approach. With encouragement from community activists in south Minneapolis, the Minneapolis city government hired Dworkin and MacKinnon to draft an antipornography civil rights ordinance as an amendment to the Minneapolis city civil rights ordinance.

The amendment defined pornography as a civil rights violation against women, and allowed women who claimed harm from pornography to sue the producers and distributors in civil court for damages. The law was passed twice by the Minneapolis city council, but vetoed both times by Mayor Don Fraser, who considered the wording of the ordinance to be too vague. Another version of the ordinance passed in Indianapolis, Indiana, in 1984, but was overturned as unconstitutional under the First Amendment by the Seventh Circuit Court of Appeals in the case American Booksellers v. Hudnut in 1985. Dworkin continued to support the civil rights approach in her writing and activism, and supported anti-pornography feminists who organized later campaigns in Cambridge, Massachusetts (1985), and Bellingham, Washington (1988), to pass versions of the ordinance by voter initiative.

=== Testimony before Attorney General's Commission on Pornography ===
On January 22, 1986, Dworkin testified for half an hour before the Attorney General's Commission on Pornography (also known as the "Meese Commission") in New York City, and answered questions from commissioners after completing her testimony. Dworkin's testimony against pornography was praised and reprinted in the commission's final report, and Dworkin and MacKinnon marked its release by holding a joint press conference. The Meese Commission subsequently successfully demanded that convenience store chains remove from shelves men's magazines such as Playboy (Dworkin wrote that the magazine "in both text and pictures promotes both rape and child sexual abuse") and Penthouse. The demands spread nationally and intimidated some retailers into withdrawing photography magazines, among others. The Meese Commission's campaign was eventually quashed with a First Amendment admonishment against prior restraint by the United States District Court for the District of Columbia in Meese v. Playboy.

In her testimony and replies to questions from the commissioners, Dworkin denounced the use of criminal obscenity prosecutions against pornographers, stating, "We are against obscenity laws. We do not want them. I want you to understand why, whether you end up agreeing or not." She argued that obscenity laws were largely ineffectual, that when they were effectual they only suppressed pornography from public view while allowing it to flourish out of sight, and that they suppressed the wrong material, or the right material for the wrong reasons, arguing that "Obscenity laws are also woman-hating in their very construction. Their basic presumption is that it's women's bodies that are dirty."

Instead she offered five recommendations for the commission, recommending (1) that "the Justice Department instruct law-enforcement agencies to keep records of the use of pornography in violent crimes", (2) a ban on the possession and distribution of pornography in prisons, (3) that prosecutors "enforce laws against pimping and pandering against pornographers", (4) that the administration "make it a Justice Department priority to enforce RICO (the Racketeer Influenced and Corrupt Organizations Act) against the pornography industry", and (5) that Congress adopt federal anti-pornography civil rights legislation which would provide for civil damages for harm inflicted on women. She suggested that the Commission consider "creating a criminal conspiracy provision under the civil rights law, such that conspiring to deprive a person of their civil rights by coercing them into pornography is a crime, and that conspiring to traffic in pornography is conspiring to deprive women of our civil rights." Dworkin compared her proposal to the Southern Poverty Law Center's use of civil rights litigation against the Ku Klux Klan.

Dworkin also submitted into evidence a copy of Boreman's book Ordeal, as an example of the abuses that she hoped to remedy, saying "The only thing atypical about Linda is that she has had the courage to make a public fight against what has happened to her. And whatever you come up with, it has to help her or it's not going to help anyone." Boreman had testified in person before the commission, but the Commissioners had not yet seen her book.

==== Addendum: Butler decision in Canada ====
In 1992, the Supreme Court of Canada made a ruling in R. v. Butler which incorporated some elements of Dworkin and MacKinnon's legal work on pornography into the existing Canadian obscenity law. In Butler, the Court held that Canadian obscenity law violated Canadian citizens' rights to free speech under the Canadian Charter of Rights and Freedoms if enforced on grounds of morality or community standards of decency; but that obscenity law could be enforced constitutionally against some pornography on the basis of the Charter's guarantees of sex equality. The Court's decision cited extensively from briefs prepared by the Women's Legal Education and Action Fund (LEAF), with the support and participation of Catharine MacKinnon.

Dworkin opposed LEAF's position, arguing that feminists should not support or attempt to reform criminal obscenity law. In 1993, copies of Dworkin's book Pornography were held for inspection by Canada Customs agents, fostering an urban legend that Dworkin's own books had been banned from Canada under a law that she herself had promoted. However, the Butler decision did not adopt Dworkin and MacKinnon's ordinance, Dworkin did not support the decision, and her books (which were released shortly after they were inspected) were held temporarily as part of a standard procedural measure, unrelated to the Butler decision.

== Non-fiction (selected works) ==
=== Woman Hating ===
Published in 1974, Woman Hating: A Radical Look at Sexuality was Dworkin's first book outlining many foundational points comprising her developing feminist philosophy. She identifies the book as a revolutionary act, an expression of a "commitment to ending male dominance" in all its cultural and social manifestations.

The last section explores androgyny in myths and religions across the globe to "discern another ontology, one which discards the fiction that there are two polar distinct sexes." She was not alone in this endeavor. Dworkin's exploration exists in a Western literary lineage that includes Orlando: A Biography, by Virginia Woolf, and Woman on the Edge of Time, by Marge Piercy. In the final chapter, she examines sexual similarities, hermaphroditism, parthenogenesis, pansexuality, homosexuality, transsexuality, transvestism, bestiality, incest, the family, and children. About this chapter she reflects on her own theorizing as problematic, existing outside of girls' and women's lived experience: "I think there are a lot of things really wrong with the last chapter of Woman Hating", said Dworkin in an interview with Cindy Jenefsky for her book, Without Apology: Andrea Dworkin's Art and Politics. She identifies factors which influenced the chapter: 'years of reading Freud and trying to figure out abstractly what all this was about'... [A]t the time Woman Hating was written, [there were] roots in the counterculture and the sexual liberation movement."

Dworkin's work from the early 1980s onward contained frequent condemnations of incest and pedophilia as one of the chief forms of violence against women, arguing once that "incest is a crime committed against someone, a crime from which many victims never recover." In the early 1980s, she had a public feud with her formerly admired friend Allen Ginsberg, with whom she shared godparent status of a mutual friend's child. The intense disagreement was over his support for child pornography and pedophilia, in which Ginsberg said, "The right wants to put me in jail." Dworkin responded, "Yes, they're very sentimental; I'd kill you."

=== Right-Wing Women ===
In 1983, Dworkin published Right-Wing Women: The Politics of Domesticated Females, an examination of women's reasons for collaborating with conservative men for the limitation of women's freedom.

In the preface to the British edition, Dworkin stated that the New Right in the United States focused especially on preserving male authority in the family, the promotion of fundamentalist versions of orthodox religion, combating abortion, and undermining efforts to combat domestic violence, but that it also had, for the first time, "succeeded in getting women as women (women who claim to be acting in the interests of women as a group) to act effectively on behalf of male authority over women, on behalf of a hierarchy in which women are subservient to men, on behalf of women as the rightful property of men, on behalf of religion as an expression of transcendent male supremacy." Taking this as her problem, Dworkin asked, "Why do right-wing women agitate for their own subordination? How does the Right, controlled by men, enlist their participation and loyalty? And why do right-wing women truly hate the feminist struggle for equality?"

In one review, it was described as being premised on agreement between feminists and right-wing women on the existence of domination by men in sex and class, but disagreement on strategy.

=== Intercourse ===
In 1987, Dworkin published Intercourse, in which she extended her analysis from pornography to sexual intercourse itself, and argued that the sort of sexual subordination depicted in pornography was central to men's and women's experiences of heterosexual intercourse in a male supremacist society. In the book, she argues that all heterosexual sex in our patriarchal society is coercive and degrading to women, and sexual penetration may by its very nature doom women to inferiority and submission, and "may be immune to reform".

Citing from both pornography and literature—including The Kreutzer Sonata, Madame Bovary, and Dracula—Dworkin argued that depictions of intercourse in mainstream art and culture consistently emphasized heterosexual intercourse as the only kind of "real" sex, portrayed intercourse in violent or invasive terms, portrayed the violence or invasiveness as central to its eroticism, and often united it with male contempt for, revulsion towards, or even murder of, the "carnal" woman. She argued that this kind of depiction enforced a male-centric and coercive view of sexuality, and that, when the cultural attitudes combine with the material conditions of women's lives in a sexist society, the experience of heterosexual intercourse itself becomes a central part of men's subordination of women, experienced as a form of "occupation" that is nevertheless expected to be pleasurable for women and to define their very status as women.

Such descriptions are often cited by Dworkin's critics, interpreting the book as claiming "all" heterosexual intercourse is rape, or more generally that the anatomical mechanics of sexual intercourse make it intrinsically harmful to women's equality. For instance, Cathy Young says that statements such as "intercourse is the pure, sterile, formal expression of men's contempt for women" are reasonably summarized as "all sex is rape".

Dworkin rejected that interpretation of her argument, stating in a later interview that "I think both intercourse and sexual pleasure can and will survive equality" and suggesting that the misunderstanding came about because of the very sexual ideology she was criticizing: "Since the paradigm for sex has been one of conquest, possession, and violation, I think many men believe they need an unfair advantage, which at its extreme would be called rape. I do not think they need it."

=== Life and Death ===
In 1997, Dworkin published a collection of her speeches and articles from the 1990s in Life and Death: Unapologetic Writings on the Continuing War on Women, including a long autobiographical essay on her life as a writer, and articles on violence against women, pornography, prostitution, Nicole Brown Simpson, the use of rape during the war in Bosnia and Herzegovina, the Montreal massacre, Israel, and the gender politics of the United States Holocaust Memorial Museum.

Reviewing Life and Death in The New Republic, philosopher Martha Nussbaum criticizes voices in contemporary feminism for denouncing Catharine MacKinnon and Dworkin as "man-haters", and argues that First Amendment critiques of Dworkin's civil ordinance proposal against pornography "are not saying anything intellectually respectable", for the First Amendment "has never covered all speech: bribery, threats, extortionate offers, misleading advertising, perjury, and unlicensed medical advice are all unprotected." Nussbaum adds that Dworkin has focused attention on the proper moral target by making harm associated with subordination, not obscenity, civilly actionable. Nevertheless, Nussbaum opposes the adoption of Dworkin's pornography ordinance because it (1) fails to distinguish between moral and legal violations, (2) fails to demonstrate a causal relationship between pornography and specific harm, (3) holds a creator of printed images or words responsible for others' behavior, (4) grants censorial power to the judiciary (which may be directed against feminist scholarship), and (5) erases the contextual considerations within which sex takes place. More broadly, Nussbaum faults Dworkin for (1) occluding economic injustice through an "obsessive focus on sexual subordination", (2) reproducing objectification in reducing her interlocutors to their abuse, and (3) refusing reconciliation in favor of "violent extralegal resistance against male violence."

Many of Dworkin's early speeches are reprinted in her second book, Our Blood (1976). Later selections of speeches were reprinted ten and twenty years later, in Letters from a War Zone (1988) and Life and Death (1997).

In 1989, Dworkin wrote an article about her life as a battered wife in the Netherlands, "What Battery Really Is", in response to Susan Brownmiller, who had argued that Hedda Nussbaum, a battered woman, should have been indicted for her failure to stop Joel Steinberg from murdering their adoptive daughter. Newsweek initially accepted "What Battery Really Is" for publication, but then declined to publish the account at the request of their attorney, according to Dworkin, arguing that she needed either to publish anonymously "to protect the identity of the batterer" and remove references to specific injuries, or to provide "medical records, police records, a written statement from a doctor who had seen the injuries". Instead, Dworkin submitted the article to the Los Angeles Times, which published it on March 12, 1989.

== Fiction ==
Dworkin published three fictional works after achieving notice as a feminist author and activist. She published a collection of short stories, the new womans broken heart in 1980. Her first novel, Ice and Fire, was originally published in the United Kingdom in 1986. It is a first-person narrative, detailing violence and abuse; Susie Bright has claimed that it amounts to a modern feminist rewriting of one of the Marquis de Sade's most famous works, Juliette. However, Dworkin aimed to depict men's harm to women as normalized political harm, not as eccentric eroticism. Dworkin's second novel, Mercy, reviewed by the New York Times as a Bildungsroman, was first published in the United Kingdom in 1990. According to The Telegraph, the novels "were not popular".

Dworkin's short fiction and novels often incorporated elements from her life and themes from her nonfiction writing, sometimes related by a first-person narrator. Critics have sometimes quoted passages spoken by characters in Ice and Fire as representations of Dworkin's own views. Dworkin, however, wrote "My fiction is not autobiography. I am not an exhibitionist. I do not show myself. I am not asking for forgiveness. I do not want to confess. But I have used everything I know—my life—to show what I believe must be shown so that it can be faced. The imperative at the heart of my writing—what must be done—comes directly from my life. But I do not show my life directly, in full view; nor even look at it while others watch."

== Influence ==
Dworkin became one of the most influential writers and spokeswomen of American radical feminism during the late 1970s and the 1980s. She characterized pornography as an industry of damaging objectification and abuse. She discussed prostitution as a system of exploitation, and intercourse as a key site of intimate subordination in patriarchy. Her analysis and writing influenced and inspired the work of contemporary feminists such as Catharine MacKinnon, Gloria Steinem, John Stoltenberg, Nikki Craft, Susan Cole, and Amy Elman. Rebecca Traister stated that Dworkin's Intercourse was one of the books that inspired her 2018 book Good and Mad. However, Jessa Crispin reproved contemporary feminists for abandoning Dworkin's work in her 2017 book Why I Am Not a Feminist: A Feminist Manifesto.

Dworkin's uncompromising positions and forceful style of writing and speaking, described by Robert Campbell as "apocalyptic", earned her frequent comparisons to other speakers such as Malcolm X (by Robin Morgan, Susie Bright, and others). Gloria Steinem repeatedly compared her style to that of the Biblical prophets.

Critical of what she described as male supremacist values expressed among conservatives, liberals, and radicals, she nevertheless engaged with all three groups. She came out of movements led by leftist men, such as when protesting the Vietnam War or when active in the gay liberation movement. She addressed liberal men on the issue of rape. She spoke with and wrote about politically conservative women, resulting in the publication of Right-Wing Women. She testified at a Meese Commission hearing on pornography while Attorney General Edwin Meese was serving socially conservative President Ronald Reagan. She had a political discourse with National Review writer David Frum and their spouses arranged by Christopher Hitchens.

Her life partner John Stoltenberg wrote that Dworkin was a trans ally who "repudiated the sex binary—and the biological essentialism upon which belief in it is based". Stoltenberg also wrote that "she is often invoked to support beliefs she actively repudiated in her work".

== Criticism ==
Dworkin's radical views and discursive, polemical style produced sharply contrasting reactions. In 1992, Melanie McFadyean wrote: "People think Andrea's a man-hater, she gets called a Fascist and a Nazi—particularly by the American left, but it's not detectable in her work." While often polarizing among the left, Dworkin's views were also divisive in conservative circles, eliciting both praise and condemnation from right-wing critics. After her death, Andrew Sullivan, a conservative gay writer and political commentator, stated that "[m]any on the social right liked Andrea Dworkin. Like Dworkin, their essential impulse when they see human beings living freely is to try and control or stop them—for their own good. Like Dworkin, they are horrified by male sexuality, and see men as such as a problem to be tamed. Like Dworkin, they believe in the power of the state to censor and coerce sexual freedoms. Like Dworkin, they view the enormous new freedom that women and gay people have acquired since the 1960s as a terrible development for human culture." Cathy Young, an American libertarian and conservative journalist, complained of a "whitewash" in feminist obituaries for Dworkin, arguing that Dworkin's positions were manifestly misandrist, stating that Dworkin was in fact insane, criticizing what she called Dworkin's "destructive legacy", and describing Dworkin as a "sad ghost" that feminism needs to exorcise.

Other feminists published sympathetic or celebratory memorials online and in print. Catharine MacKinnon, Dworkin's longtime friend and collaborator, published a column in The New York Times, celebrating what she described as Dworkin's "incandescent literary and political career", suggested that Dworkin deserved a nomination for the Nobel Prize in Literature, and complained that "lies about her views on sexuality (that she believed intercourse was rape) and her political alliances (that she was in bed with the right) were published and republished without attempts at verification, corrective letters almost always refused. Where the physical appearance of male writers is regarded as irrelevant or cherished as a charming eccentricity, Andrea's was reviled and mocked and turned into pornography. When she sued for libel, courts trivialized the pornographic lies as fantasy and dignified them as satire."

Further critics have suggested that Dworkin called attention to real and important problems, but that her legacy as a whole had been destructive to the women's movement. Her work and activism on pornography—especially in the form of the Antipornography Civil Rights Ordinance—were criticized by liberal groups such as the Feminist Anti-Censorship Task Force (FACT).

Dworkin was also met with criticism from sex-positive feminists, in what became known as the feminist sex wars of the late 1970s and 1980s. The sex wars were a series of heated debates that polarized feminist thought on a number of issues relating to sex and sexuality. Sex-positive feminist critics criticized Dworkin's legal activism as censorious, and argued that her work on pornography and sexuality promoted an essentialist, conservative, or repressive view of sexuality, which they often characterized as "anti-sex" or "sex-negative". Her criticisms of common heterosexual sexual expression, pornography, prostitution, and sadomasochism were frequently claimed to disregard women's own agency in sex or deny women's sexual choices. Dworkin countered that her critics often misrepresented her views, and that under the heading of "choice" and "sex-positivity", her feminist critics were failing to question the often violent political structures that confined women's choices and shaped the meaning of sex acts.

In the 21st century, Dworkin has garnered favor with some members of younger generations of feminists, Lauren Oyler (b. 1991), Moira Donegan (b. 1989), Jennifer Szalai (b. 1979–80), Michelle Goldberg (b. 1975), and Joanna Fateman (b. 1974), who consider liberal and sex-positive feminism lacking in depth of analysis and action.

== In popular culture ==
In Dworkin's lifetime, two volumes considered and analyzed the body of her work: Andrea Dworkin by Jeremy Mark Robinson, first published in 1994, and Without Apology: Andrea Dworkin's Art and Politics by Cindy Jenefsky in 1998. Dworkin's influence has continued beyond her death. The play Aftermath was produced in 2015 by John Stoltenberg, based on Dworkin's unpublished writing. The Dworkin anthology Last Days at Hot Slit was published in 2019. The documentary feature My Name is Andrea by Pratibha Parmar was released in 2020; the biography Andrea Dworkin: The Feminist as Revolutionary by Martin Duberman was published the same year. Dworkin's book proposal for Writing America: How Novelists Invented and Gendered a Nation was made public in mid-2022.

== Bibliography ==
=== Non-fiction ===
==== Sole author ====
List of books, with first edition details
| Title | First edition details | |
| Title | Year | Publisher |
|---|---|---|
| Woman Hating: A Radical Look at Sexuality | 1974 | E. P. Dutton |
| Our Blood: Prophecies and Discourses on Sexual Politics | 1976 | Harper & Row |
| Pornography: Men Possessing Women | 1981 | Putnam |
| Right-Wing Women: The Politics of Domesticated Females | 1983 | The Women's Press |
| Intercourse | 1987 | Free Press |
| Letters from a War Zone: Writings, 1976–1989 | 1989 | E. P. Dutton |
| Life and Death: Unapologetic Writings on the Continuing War Against Women | 1997 | Virago Press |
| Scapegoat: The Jews, Israel, and Women's Liberation | 2000 | Free Press |
| Heartbreak: The Political Memoir of a Feminist Militant | 2002 | Basic Books |

==== Co-authored/co-edited with Catharine A. MacKinnon ====
- The Reasons Why: Essays on the New Civil Rights Law Recognizing Pornography as Sex Discrimination. New York: Women Against Pornography. 1985. OCLC 15992953.

Includes:
- Dworkin, Andrea (Spring 1985). "Against the Male Flood: Censorship, Pornography, and Equality". Harvard Journal of Law & Gender. 8: 1–30. Pdf.

- Pornography and Civil Rights: A New Day for Women's Equality. Minneapolis, Minnesota: Organizing Against Pornography. 1988. ISBN 9780962184901. Available online.
- In Harm's Way: The Pornography Civil Rights Hearings, Dworkin, Andrea; MacKinnon, Catharine A., eds. Boston: Harvard University Press. 1998. ISBN 9780674445796

==== Anthologies ====
- Last Days at Hot Slit: The Radical Feminism of Andrea Dworkin, Fateman, Joanna; Scholder, Amy, eds. Cambridge: The MIT Press. 2019. ISBN 9781635900804

==== Chapters in other anthologies ====
- Lederer, Laura; Delgado, Richard, eds. (1995). "Pornography happens to women". The price we pay: the case against racist speech, hate propaganda, and pornography. New York: Hill and Wang. ISBN 978-0809015771.
- Bell, Diane, & Renate Klein, eds. (1996). "Dworkin on Dworkin". Radically Speaking: Feminism Reclaimed (N. Melbourne, Vic., Australia: Spinifex. pp 203–0217. ISBN 1-875559-38-8.
- Jackson, Stevi; Scott, Sue, eds. (1996). "Biological superiority: the world's most dangerous and deadly idea". Feminism and sexuality: a reader. New York: Columbia University Press. pp. 57–61. doi:10.1515/9781474469517-006. ISBN 978-0231107082.
- Jackson, Stevi; Scott, Sue, eds. (1996). "Pornography". Feminism and sexuality: a reader. New York: Columbia University Press. pp. 297–299. ISBN 978-0231107082.
- Morgan, Robin, ed. (2003). "Landscape of the ordinary: violence against women". Sisterhood is forever: the women's anthology for a new millennium. New York: Washington Square Press. pp. 58–69. ISBN 978-0743466271.

=== Fiction ===
List of books, with first edition details
| Title | First edition details | |
| Title | Year | Publisher |
|---|---|---|
| The New Woman's Broken Heart: Short Stories | 1980 | Frog in the Well |
| Ice and Fire: A Novel | 1986 | Secker & Warburg |
| Mercy | 1991 | Four Walls Eight Windows |

=== Poetry ===
- Child. Crete: Heraklion. 1966. OCLC 4708955.
- Morning hair. Philadelphia: Philadelphia College of Art. 1967. OCLC 9290267.

=== Articles ===
- Marx and Gandhi were liberals: feminism and the 'radical' left. East Palo Alto, CA: Frog in the Well. 1977. OCLC 6189987.
- Why so-called radical men love and need pornography. East Palo Alto, CA: Frog in the Well. 1978. OCLC 8309555.
- "Against the male flood: censorship, pornography, and equality". Harvard Journal of Law & Gender. 8: 1–30. Spring 1985. Pdf
- Pornography is a Civil Rights Issue for Women. Minneapolis, MN: Organizing Against Pornography. 1986. OCLC 18843030. Page 1 of 4 Page 2 of 4. Page 3 of 4 Page 4 of 4
- "Pornography is a civil rights issue for women". NoStatusQuo. Nikki Craft. 1986. Pdf. Page 1 of 2 Page 2 of 2
- "The ACLU: bait and switch". Yale Journal of Law and Feminism. 1 (1): 37–40. Spring 1989. Pdf
- "Prostitution and male supremacy". Michigan Journal of Gender and Law. 1: 1–12. 1993. Page 1 of 2. Page 2 of 2
- Are you listening, Hillary? President Rape is who he is. 1999.
- Excerpt with Note from John Stoltenberg, May 25, 2007
- "A good rape". New Statesman. June 30, 2003. Archived from the original on October 4, 2018. A review of Lucky, by Alice Sebold, ISBN 978-0684857824
- "Out of the closet". New Statesman. September 22, 2003. Archived from the original on January 1, 2017. A review of Normal: transsexual CEOs, cross-dressing cops and hermaphrodites with attitude, by Amy Bloom, ISBN 978-0747564560
- "The day I was drugged and raped". New Statesman. March 4, 2013.

=== Speeches ===
- Andrea Dworkin's Attorney General's Commission Testimony on Pornography and Prostitution
- "Freedom Now: Ending Violence Against Women", November 1992.
- "Speech from Duke University, January 1985"

=== Spoken-word recording ===
- Taped Phone Interview Andrea Dworkin interviewed by Nikki Craft on Allen Ginsberg, May 9, 1990. (Audio File, 20 min, 128 kbit/s, mp3)
- Dworkin on Dworkin, c. 1980

== Sources ==
- Dworkin, Andrea (2002). Heartbreak: The Political Memoir of a Feminist Militant. Basic Books.
- Dworkin, Andrea (1987). Intercourse. Basic Books.
- Dworkin, Andrea (1989a). Letters From a War Zone. New York: Dutton. ISBN 978-0525248248.
- Dworkin, Andrea (1997). Life and Death. London: Virago.
- Dworkin, Andrea (1976). Our Blood: Prophecies and Discourses on Sexual Politics. New York: G.P. Putnam's Sons. ISBN 0-399-50575-X.
- Dworkin, Andrea (1978a). Right-Wing Women. New York: G.P. Putman's Sons. ISBN 0-399-50671-3.
- Dworkin, Andrea (1974). Woman Hating: A Radical Look at Sexuality. E. P. Dutton. ISBN 978-0-452-26827-2.
