= Scapegoat: The Jews, Israel, and Women's Liberation =

2000 book by Andrea Dworkin

- Cover of the first edition
- Author: Andrea Dworkin
- Language: English
- Publisher: Free Press
- Publication date: 2000
- Publication place: United States
- Media type: Print
- Pages: 436
- ISBN: 0-684-83612-2
- OCLC: 42733805

Scapegoat: The Jews, Israel, and Women's Liberation is the ninth nonfiction book by Jewish-American radical feminist writer and activist Andrea Dworkin. It was first published in 2000 by Free Press.

== Thesis ==
In Scapegoat, Dworkin compared the oppression of women with the persecution of Jews (writing that both groups had been scapegoated), discussed the sexual politics of Jewish identity and antisemitism, and called for the establishment of a women's homeland as a response to the oppression of women, just as the Zionist movement had established a state for Jews.

Dworkin wrote that while the modern state of Israel was created due to the historical persecution of Jewish people, this was also driven by Jewish Israeli men's felt need to prove their masculinity in response to that past victimization. Dworkin said this led to a militaristic and patriarchal society in Israel that subjugated Jewish women, Arab Israelis, and Palestinian people.

== Reception ==
Kirkus Reviews dismissed Scapegoat as a "deplorable piece of man-hating propaganda", stating that Dworkin "exhibits an ignorance of many of the subjects most relevant to her argument" and that she "ends up committing the very sin she seeks to expose, 'scapegoating' all men for all injustice in every period of history."

Nicci Gerrard of The Guardian described Scapegoat as presenting Dworkin’s "dark and dismaying view of the world", arguing that the book links nationalism and misogyny through comparisons between the persecution of Jews and the oppression of women. While calling its force "undeniable, robust, fierce and steamrolling", the reviewer argued that its coherence also results in "simplification."

Writing in Spectre, Sophie Lewis argued that Scapegoat represents the "despairing culmination” of Dworkin’s thought, contending that the book advocates the creation of an "Israel" for women and links women’s liberation to nationalist violence. Lewis criticized the work as relying on sweeping historical analogies and described its argument as "dazzlingly erudite and stunningly stupid", ultimately characterizing its political vision as "fascistic".
