= Pornography: Men Possessing Women =

1981 book by Andrea Dworkin

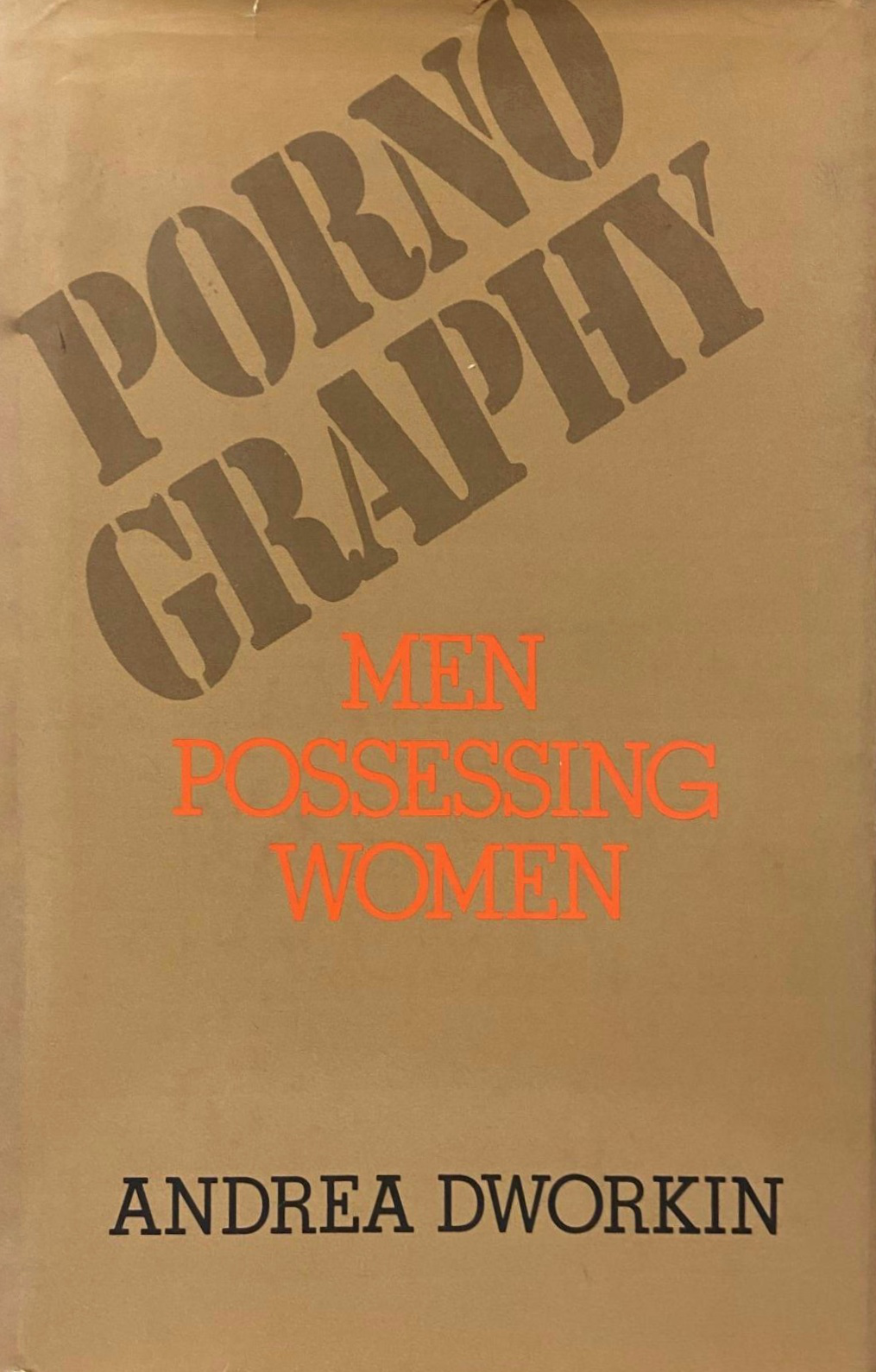
- Cover of the first edition
- Author: Andrea Dworkin
- Language: English
- Subject: Pornography
- Publisher: Putnam
- Publication date: 1981
- Publication place: United States
- Media type: Print (hardcover and paperback)
- Pages: 300
- ISBN: 978-0-399-12619-2
- OCLC: 7197368

Pornography: Men Possessing Women is the third nonfiction book by American radical feminist writer and activist Andrea Dworkin. It was published in 1981 by Putnam. An anti-pornography feminist, Dworkin argued that pornography dehumanizes women and that the pornography industry is implicated in violence against women.

== Summary ==
Dworkin analyzes (and extensively cites examples drawn from) contemporary and historical pornography as an industry that hates and dehumanizes women. Dworkin argues that the industry is implicated in violence against women, both in its production (through the abuse of the women that are used to star in it) and in the social consequences of its consumption by encouraging men to eroticize the domination, humiliation, and abuse of women.

Dworkin draws on testimonies of women, who have suffered as a consequence of sexual abuse and exploitation, and compares it to exploitation under slavery, using the example of Frederick Douglass. She explains how several attempts were made to draft laws defining pornography as a violation of women's rights, but none were successful. "Women continue speaking out in public forums, even though we are formally and purposefully silenced in actual courts of law", she writes. She questions why women's subjugation and abuse is seen as something they enjoy, contrary to other forms of violence, such as antisemitism in Nazi Germany.

The book is about whether pornography, defined as "the graphic depiction of whores", allows women to exercise the rights protected by the First Amendment. Dworkin makes the distinction between obscenity, which requires moral judgment; erotics, which are supposedly based on mutuality and reciprocity; and pornography. But she argues that erotics are "high-class pornography" in a male-dominated system.

=== Chapter 1: Power ===
She outlines the power of men as: 1) a metaphysical assertion of self; 2) physical strength; 3) the capacity to terrorize; 4) the power of naming; 5) the power of owning; 6) the power of money; and 7) the power of sex.

1. The "metaphysical assertion of self" is described as a subject position. The male self is defined by this continuum of wanting and taking. "I want and I am entitled to have, therefore I am", she writes of the male self. Dworkin suggests that men occupy a powerful subject position that is protected by laws and customs, art and literature, documented in history, and upheld in the distribution of wealth. Men have this self (an "unselfconscious parasitism"), and women must, by definition, lack it. The first sign of his parasitism is in his relationship to his mother. He then transfers this to other women in his life and uses women to enlarge himself.
2. Men also have the power of physical strength, which is based on legends and myths as much as reality. This is not the same as being muscular or strong, but it is the right to physical strength. "Its [physical strength] absolute value is mythologized and mystified so that women are cowed by its legend as well as its reality". She explains how physical weakness in women is wanted by men and how they raise and choose weak women, tying weakness to feminine beauty. Making it a symbol of wealth for men and a necessity for better economic aspirations for women.
3. The capacity to terrorize is the metaphysical assertion of self plus strength, which creates fear in a whole class of people (men over women). This happens through rape, battery, sexual abuse, and the use of prostitutes. This behavior is idolized in movies about heroism, war, and glory. In TV, literature, books, drama, this story plays out. Men's acts are huge and awesome even when villainous, and women become the prize. Dworkin outlines how male supremacist biology, Social Darwinism, and religion all contribute to sacralizing male violence and encouraging it. Men's dangerous nature is generated through culture and promotion of violent acts, as well as "its enduring reputation", whether for good or not.
4. The power of naming means that men have the ability to define experiences, and this is upheld by force and then used to justify force. As an example, men name women as "weak" and then further weaken them with preferences and standards of beauty that leave women mutilated and stunted. "If she wants him sexually he names her slut; if she does not want him he rapes her and says she does; if she would rather study or paint he names her repressed and brags he can cure her pathological interests with the apocryphal 'good fuck'", Dworkin writes. Anything that contradicts this power is destroyed, thus, "the power of naming itself, in the male system, is a form of force".
5. The power of owning refers to husbands' ownership of wives and fathers' ownership of daughters. This ownership is natural, as he is the "one who takes". Once he has had, it is his. It is not defined merely by its real manifestation. Dworkin argues that the institution of marriage was derived from rape as a practice. "Rape, originally defined as abduction, became marriage by capture. Marriage meant the taking was to extend in time, to be not only use of but lifelong possession of, or ownership", she says.
6. Men also have the power of money. In the hands of women, money buys things; it stays literal. Money in the hands of a woman is sometimes evidence of something foul: unwomanly ambition and greed. For men, money buys women, sex, status, dignity, esteem, loyalty, and all manner of possibility; it brings qualities, achievements, and respect. Money in the hands of a man signifies worth and accomplishment. Women, when poor, use money for survival, and if they're rich, they use it to attract men. Whereas, men use money for pleasure, and rich men also use it for investment. Discrimination and oppression also "keep women as a class poor, away from money as such, unable to earn adequate amounts of money or to accumulate it". Dworkin draws a link between sex and money, showing how many industries rely on eroticizing products to sell more and how men are encouraged to hoard and invest both money and sperm. "A boy spends; a man produces. Spending indicates an immature valuing of immediate gratification. Producing signifies an enduring commitment to self-control and to the control of others, both crucial in the perpetuation of male supremacy". Poor men also turn to other forms of power to compensate when money is lacking.
7. Lastly, Dworkin suggests that men have the power of sex although they assert the opposite. The carnality of women is said to be the defining characteristic of women. Women have sexual power because the erection is involuntary and a woman is always the presumed cause; therefore, the man is helpless and the woman powerful. The male reacts to a stimulus for which he is not responsible. Whatever he does, he does out of a provocation from a female—she is the temptress. This makes men not responsible for their actions and justifies assault and abuse. Sex is also defined by men's actions, their virility, making it "an act of possession" that happens to women. Dworkin argues that fucking enlarges men by diminishing women. Its representation in culture and its use to justify domination ("she provoked me") are still present.

"Male power is the raison d'être of pornography; the degradation of the female is the means of achieving this power". Dworkin then uses examples of books and photographs to illustrate male power, even when these books are about "liberated" women, homosexual men or lesbians, showing how "the power of the male is affirmed as omnipresent and controlling even when the male himself is absent and invisible". "There is no privacy, no closed door, no self-determined meaning, for women with each other in the world of pornography".

=== Chapter 2: Men and Boys ===
In this chapter Dworkin begins by wondering why "adult men are convinced and sincere in their perception of adult women in particular as objects". She argues that boys witnessing violence and powerlessness will choose "to emulate the father because it is safer to be like the father than like the mother". To build his masculinity and forget his infantile powerlessness, the boy distances himself from women. "The first rule of masculinity is that whatever he is, women are not".

She then argues that to become free, men master fear and violence, as it is the primary component of their male identity. In different forms and ways, men all practice violence; their commitment to it, instead of being victimized by it, is what differentiates them from women. They are also rewarded for it.

She argues that the penis represents male violence and that the vagina is seen by men as an empty space to be filled up by penetration or childbearing. Women's aversion to sex is then interpreted as their rebellion against male aggression.

She then says that the intense preservation of boys and men against male sexual violence shows that their lives are deemed worthy, contrary to a female life, which "warrants protection only when the female belongs to a male, as wife, daughter, mistress, whore". Sexual violence against girls and women is normalized and sanctioned to preserve men and boys. She continues to state that only when a woman is subsequently secured to a male via a relationship, marriage, or relation is she afforded the same protection as men. She also states that by society categorizing male sexual violence into heterosexual and homosexual, there are higher concentrated and punitive penalties for male-to-male sexual violence. Men who were victims of sexual abuse often cross the line to become perpetrators as adults, whereas women tend to turn to self-hatred and define sex as a forced interaction. Incest against boys is rare, as "one-to-one sexual combat between fathers and sons would rend the fabric of patriarchy". Race and money also affect the representation of sexual abuse, as prison rapes, mostly Black in the US, are also normalized. Even in ancient Greece, homosexual relations were built on the subjugation of devalued, younger men, as well as women and girls.

"Every attempt she makes to reclaim the humanity he has stolen from her makes her subject to insult, ridicule, and abuse. In his view, she is not a woman unless she acts like a woman as he has defined woman. [...] Men want women to be objects, controllable as objects are controllable. Women who deviate from the male definition are monstrous, sluts, depraved. [...] Anything, including memory or conscience, that pulls a man toward women as humans, not as objects and not as monsters, does endanger him. But the danger is always from other men."

— p. 65–66

Lastly, she talks about the split between mind and body and the alienation and nihilism of the modern era: "For men, their right to control and abuse the bodies of women is the one comforting constant in a world rigged to blow up but they do not know when." She then states that commitment to masculinity is commitment to genocide and suicide, using historical examples of man-made atrocities and drawing parallels with pornography. "The private world of sexual dominance that men demand as their right and their freedom is the mirror image of the public world of sadism and atrocity that men consistently and self-righteously deplore. It is in the male experience of pleasure that one finds the meaning of male history."

=== Chapter 3: The Marquis de Sade (1740–1814) ===
In this chapter, she explores how Sade was the first pornography writer and how his writing reveals the links between fucking and torturing and between sex and violence in pornography. Sade's writings were applauded by many thinkers and seen as the expression of absolute freedom and rebellion. "Sade's cultural influence on all levels is pervasive", she says, defining his ethics as "the right of men to rape and brutalize every 'object of desire' at will". She then narrates his life as a high-class nobleman in France, abusing and torturing mostly "whores and servants" in a context where lower classes are starving. Sade's torturing of prostitutes was so alarming that police warned matrons not to provide him with sex workers. He would beat, rape, sodomize, and poison his victims, as well as force them to renounce their religion. He was arrested several times and escaped. Sade's wife, Renée-Pélagie, was both a victim and a participant. Besides a single arrest related to politics, all of his arrests were linked to assaulting people and distributing pornographic material.

She explains that "the belief that women exist to be used by men is so old, so deep set, so widely accepted, so commonplace in its everyday application, that it is rarely challenged, even by those who pride themselves on and are recognized for their intellectual acumen and ethical grace". Thus women are made to be shadows, never significant beings to be mentioned in biographies, analyses, and translations of Sade's work, which often attempt to justify, minimize, or even deny his violence and recriminate the puritanism of the time instead. "Violence against prostitutes, regardless of its ferocity, is nothing less than an acceptable fact of life", Dworkin notes. "An exchange of money, male to female, especially wipes away crime, negates harm—whether the commentator is a pedestrian biographer or a grand literary critic. The use of money to buy women is apparently mesmerizing. It magically licenses any crime against women".

Therefore, biographers and commentators attempted to whitewash Sade by claiming that his non-prostitute victim, Rose Keller, was a liar or a whore. Biographers even accused Madame de Montreuil, Sade's mother-in-law and the only woman who ever tried to stop him, of being jealous of her daughter, vindictive, and evil. Sade's mother and Pélagie are also blamed for his mistakes, even though he was extremely abusive to his wife.

Sade is depicted as a free, revolutionary figure who attempted to challenge a conservative, repressive society "that must contain, control, and manipulate sexuality, not allow it to run free toward anarchic self-fulfillment". Legend claims that Sade was unjustly imprisoned simply for writing out his sexual fantasies. For Dworkin, writers' obsession with depicting Sade as a martyr for freedom stems from the empathy they have towards him. "Sade suffered because he did what you want to do; he was imprisoned as you might be imprisoned. The 'you' is masculine". Sade defended himself by either denying the accusations or arguing that these practices were common, as he claimed, "I am guilty of nothing more than simple libertinage such as it is practiced by all men more or less according to their natural temperaments or tendencies". For Sade, libertinage was equivalent to slavery and sexual abuse.

In Sade's writings, powerful, aristocratic men are often humiliating and abusing their wives or mothers and raping and torturing servants, men, and women. These powerful men are addicted to cruelty, which has to progressively increase to increase their pleasure, and they are always in control, even when they are beaten. Two female protagonists especially represent "the two prototypical female figures in male pornography of all types". One resists male abuse, and her resistance and suffering are arousing, seen as a symbol of goodness. The other enjoys it, recreating herself as a cruel man in everything but her anatomy. "The vileness of women and an intense hatred of female genitalia are major themes in every Sadean opus". Sade also repeatedly depicts children as victims of sexual abuse, often from their fathers, while their mothers are represented as repressed, hateful creatures.

Dworkin links Sade with leftist theories of "sexual revolution", which are not based on bodily integrity. "Sade pioneered what became the ethos of the male-dominated sexual revolution: collective ownership of women by men, no woman ever justified in refusal", she writes. For her, Sade represents every man's sexual fantasies, upheld by male-supremacist laws. "In Sade, the authentic equation is revealed: the power of the pornographer is the power of the rapist/batterer is the power of the man".

=== Chapter 4: Objects ===
Dworkin argues that women in Europe and the United States were still chattel property up until the 19th century in economic aspects. For sex and reproduction, they are still chattel property, as marital rape is not criminalized and battery is not really punished. She argues that within this system, it isn't surprising that men see women as objects. She then details how men are expected to relate to women as objects, how it starts with their mothers, whom they're encouraged to seek revenge on. Psychologists also have several theories explaining the objectification of women. "The inevitable and intrinsic cruelty involved in turning a person into an object should be apparent, but since this constricting, this undermining, this devaluing, is normative, no particular cruelty is recognized in it."

She explains how seeing women as objects, formed by men, "to be used as men wish to use her", is used to justify sexual assault. "She is then a provocation [...] When the object complains about the use to which she is put, she is told, simply and firmly, not to provoke". She defines objectification as "an internalized, nearly invariable response by the male to a form that is, in his estimation and experience, sufficiently whatever he needs to provoke arousal". It is taken for granted that objectification needs to occur for a sexual response to happen. She argues that objectification, whether anecdotal or sinister or racist, is never trivial and that it all comes from the same value system. Objectification also happens with male idealization of beauty, which seeks to freeze women in time.

Inappropriate behavior by women can also ruin their beauty, such as reading or writing. Ideal beauty also usually requires deformation of the natural body. "Ranging from idiocy to atrocity, any and all strategies are employed so that the natural female body will fit the male idea of ideal female beauty", Dworkin notes. "An object is always destroyed in the end by its use when it is used to the fullest and enough; and in the realm of female beauty, the final value of the object is precisely to be found in its cruel or deadly destruction". She details how sexual violence operates both on beautiful and non-beautiful women, even racialized women or prostitutes, whose sexuality is seen as dangerous.

"The intense and obsessive use of person as object is seen as the solution to man's alienation—not as the source of it nor as one of its most numbing manifestations". Objectification, a diminished way to perceive, is seen as essential to a man's individuality and a tribute to his discernment, according to certain psychologists.

Dworkin then analyzes the difference between fetishism, which is seen as an inappropriate narrowing of sexual responsiveness, and objectification. "The two are not really distinct at all; they reveal a continuum of incapacity", she argues. "The fact is that men can and do fetishize everything", she says, arguing that women cannot match them or try to avoid them. Fetishes are inseparable from a "context of power and predation". Common fashion is also based on men's fetishes. "Women's fashion” is a euphemism for fashion created by men for women; the failure to follow the dicta of this fashion has severe economic repercussions for any woman".

"She is used until she knows only that she is a thing to be used. This knowledge is her authentic erotic sensibility: her erotic destiny. The more she is a thing, the more she provokes erection; the more she is a thing, the more she fulfills her purpose; her purpose is to be the thing that provokes erection. She starts out searching for love or in love with love. She finds love as men understand it in being the thing men use."

— p. 128

Lastly, Dworkin argues that women are the fetish. "Without her as fetish—the charmed object—the male, including the male homosexual, would be unable to experience his own selfhood, his own power, his own penile presence and sexual superiority". Female humanity is destroyed when she is made to be a symbol, constantly perceived as a thing.

=== Chapter 5: Force ===
Dworkin analyzes the racial and gender dimensions of a photograph, which presents female sexuality as sadistic. Citing psychologists such as Havelock Ellis or Bruno Bettelheim, she examines theories on sexuality and female sadism, used to justify men's forceful or cruel behavior. "As long as this alleged female sadism is controlled by men, it can be manipulated to give men pleasure: dominance in the male system is pleasure".

She then argues that these male fantasies are presented as if they were women's natural state. "What women in private want to do just happens to be what men want them to do. This is the meanest theme of pornography: the elucidation of what men insist is the secret, hidden, true carnality of women, free women", she writes. According to her, this illusion of free will creates "an inevitable necessity: these females, basically cruel, must be controlled, and any strategy that effectively controls them is warranted because they have no recognizable civilized sensibility or intellectual capacity". She continues by comparing pornography to rape, stating that the "essence of rape is in the conviction that such photographs—in any way, to any degree—show a female sexuality independent of male power, outside the bounds of male supremacy, uncontaminated by male force".

"If the harlot nature of the female is her true nature, then nothing that signifies or reveals that nature is either violating or victimizing."

— p. 138

Dworkin then analyzes a pornographic photograph with a laser and the dangers of its use on human bodies, linking to The Holocaust and to witch trials, particularly in Germany, in the 16th century. "The sexualization of 'the Jewess' in cultures that abhor the Jew—subtly or overtly—is the paradigm for the sexualization of all racially or ethnically degraded women", she writes. She argues that the "concentration camp woman [...] became the hidden sexual secret of our time", that she "has defined contemporary mass sexuality, given it its distinctly and unabashedly mass-sadistic character", that is, she is a sexual memory that lives in all men. Even men from racial minorities, after having "reclaimed their masculinity", will avenge themselves on racialized women. She then argues that, for Jews and for all women, force is used but made invisible, as they are presented as having wanted that force or having conformed to it, because "women are metaphysical victims: actualized, not forced", responsible for the violence enacted upon them. Thus, women are defined as masochists. "She wants it, they all do", she repeats several times.

She also criticizes what she calls the liberal view, according to which women have a choice to deviate from social norms, a choice that will lead her to being "hunted out of society".

Through the analysis of pornographic pictures, Dworkin exposes racial dynamics, showing Latina women as overtly sexual and Latino men as bestial, while white men are shown as civilized. She states that racially degraded men are complicit in the degradation of women, as it validates their masculinity. He might avenge himself on women from other races but will never express solidarity with women from his race.

"The racially degraded male is, in fact, consistently depicted in this fashion: his alleged sexual nature, being brute and thus bestial, is precisely what licenses violence against him in a racist value system. His sexuality is a savage masculinity, while the phallus of the white carries civilization to the dark places."

— p. 157

Some thinkers (Ellis, Tripp, and Stoller) have also tied heightened antagonism, or danger, with more sexual arousal. With racial dynamics, this antagonism is expressed through white men fearing that racialized men might take "their women", but "in fact, he is afraid that this sexuality will be used against him", thus, the "sexual use of the racially degraded female" helps turn this antagonism into pleasure.

Dworkin then explains through a story how "force is sex", and that submitting to violence is what allows women to reach "transcendent femininity", only allowed for white women. She is the boss who demands servicing, who demands force and violence and pain; she is insatiable; she is the unquenchable submissive whose femininity is fulfilled in the most abject degradation.

Through "celebration of force", "rape becomes just a better-quality fuck and battery becomes excellent foreplay". And this applies to all women, unless their race adds on "other sexual attributes" imposed by society.

"The pornographic conceit is that the normal female demands the force, the violence, the pain. This pornographic conceit is precisely reiterated in the works of the most distinguished sexual philosophers, who as purveyors of male supremacy necessarily share the values implicit in it [...] Men do not believe that rape or battery are violations of female will in part because men of influence have consumed pornography in the private world of men for centuries."

— p. 165–166

She then analyzes Georges Bataille's Story of the Eye, arguing that "men believe what Bataille believes and makes pretty: that death is the dirty secret of sex. In some cases, the death is literal. In some cases, it is the annihilation of female will". According to her, Bataille romanticizes death, and equates to sex in his novel.

Dworkin then argues that it is a popular belief that women do not want sex. But, whether women want sex or not, force is warranted. The woman who does want it wants force. She expresses this desire for force by resisting, which provokes force, which is what she wants. The woman who does not want it must be forced. Once the woman who does not want it has been forced, she is indistinguishable from the woman who resisted because she did want it.

Lastly, she examines and criticizes sexual theories of Alfred Kinsey and books such as Sex Offenders, which justify rape and sexual assault against women and girls, blaming women for being sexually apathetic or inhibited. Women resisting is interpreted as moralistic or as foreplay. "The female is never entitled not to want sex. Force used against her when she refuses is always warranted because she is never either justified or serious in not wanting sex. No authentic idea of bodily integrity is ever hers to claim or to have", she writes.

=== Chapter 6: Pornography ===
Dworkin dissects the etymology of the word "pornography", defined as "the graphic depiction of women as vile whores", the lowest class of sex workers in ancient Greece. The meaning, the depiction of sexual chattel, has not changed, but the means have, now including photography and videos.

"Men have created the group, the type, the concept, the epithet, the insult, the industry, the trade, the commodity, the reality of woman as a whore. Woman as whore exists within the objective and real system of male sexual domination."

— p. 200

She argues that pornography and its dehumanization of women are real and that it sells and embodies the idea that women's sexuality is dirty. Pornography's growth among men implies the need for more pornia, more sex workers. Technology encourages its increase and "more and more passive acquiescence to the graphic depiction". "In the male system, women are sex; sex is the whore. [...] Being her means being pornography", she concludes.

=== Chapter 7: Whores ===
Male domination of women's bodies is a material reality, ensured by institutions such as law, healthcare, the economy, organized religion, and pornography... all struggle for dignity and self-determination is rooted in the struggle for actual control of one's own body, she writes. She also says that at the heart of male sexual domination lies the belief that all women are whores, thus rape and prostitution cannot be seen as violations. Mothers, undesirable women, are the only ones who escape this trope. Prostitutes are portrayed as especially greedy whores, who do it for pleasure, money, or both.

Both left-wing and right-wing ideologies are based on the same metaphysics of women as whores. But "the right-wing ideology claims that the division of mother and whore is phenomenologically real. The virgin is the potential mother. The left-wing ideology claims that sexual freedom is in the unrestrained use of women, the use of women as a collective natural resource, not privatized, not owned by one man but instead used by many", she writes, arguing that the left uses freedom, while the right uses goodness to convince women. The pornography industry used to be held by right-wing men, but now left-wing men control it in the name of liberation.

"Capitalism is not wicked or cruel when the commodity is the whore; profit is not wicked or cruel when the alienated worker is a female piece of meat; corporate bloodsucking is not wicked or cruel when the corporations in question, organized crime syndicates, sell cunt; racism is not wicked or cruel when the black cunt or yellow cunt or red cunt or Hispanic cunt or Jewish cunt has her legs splayed for any man's pleasure; poverty is not wicked or cruel when it is the poverty of dispossessed women who have only themselves to sell; violence by the powerful against the powerless is not wicked or cruel when it is called sex; slavery is not wicked or cruel when it is sexual slavery; torture is not wicked or cruel when the tormented are women, whores, cunts."

— p. 209

She narrates the events in a book, Black Fashion Model, to show that the main character's "main sexual part is her [Black] skin". "This is the specific sexual value of the black woman in pornography in the United States, a race-bound society fanatically committed to the sexual devaluing of black skin perceived as a sex organ and a sexual nature", she writes. According to her, the sexualization of race is a purpose and consequence of pornography.

She then tackles pornography of pregnant women, indicating that "the maternal is included in the whorish", that pregnancy is seen "as a condition of both bondage and humiliation", and that "her belly is phallic triumph". This type of pornography was, at the time, secret and mostly right-wing. She links this obsession with right-wing attempts to ban abortion, as pregnancy is supposed to be a punishment for sex.

"We will know that we are free when the pornography no longer exists. As long as it does exist, we must understand that we are the women in it: used by the same power, subject to the same valuation, as the vile whores who beg for more. [...] The boys are betting that their penises and fists and knives and fucks and rapes will turn us into what they say we are—the compliant women of sex, the voracious cunts of pornography, the masochistic sluts who resist because we really want more. The boys are betting. The boys are wrong."

— p. 224

She likens Caesarean sections to a "surgical fuck" and compares the power of men in pornography to an imperial power, to "the power of the sovereigns who are cruel and arrogant, who keep taking and conquering for the pleasure of power and the power of pleasure". Neither desire nor reproduction will save women from their representation as whores.

== Reception ==
Dworkin's take on pornography, and her claim that it is a priority for the feminist movement, changed the intellectual landscape in the 1980s. However, by the 1990s, her point was seen as a diversion.

In 1981, Ellen Willis notes that feminist anti-pornography have surfaced simultaneously with far-right ideologies seeking to attack women's bodily autonomy and sexual freedom. "This peculiar confluence raises the question of whether the current feminist preoccupation with pornography is really an attempt to extend the movement's critique of sexism—or whether, on the contrary, it is evidence that feminists have been affected by the conservative climate and are unconsciously moving with the cultural tide", she questions. She also argues that Dworkin's work is a "booklength sermon, preached with a rhetorical flourish and a singleminded intensity that meet somewhere between poetry and rant". "Andrea Dworkin's moral universe the battle of the sexes is a Manichaean clash between absolute power and absolute powerlessness, absolute villains and absolute victims". She says Dworkin's text lacks ambiguity and contradiction and that it conflates Sade's life with his work. "Without contradiction there can be no change, only impotent moralizing. And in the end moralizing always works against women", she concludes.

Terry Baum has written that the book is a "revelation" and that Dworkin "spoke with the urgency and eloquence of the Biblical prophets".

Charlotte Shane, a writer and publisher who had read Dworkin in her teen years before working as a sex worker, criticizes the author "for the degrading, almost gleefully cruel way she wrote about prostitutes". "An inability to admit the possibility of heterosocial tenderness is part of what makes Dworkin's work so suffocating", she writes. "Women couldn't be subjects, only faceless victims, and they were described as emptier still when they failed to live up to Dworkin's politics". Shane argues that Dworkin's voicing out the most patriarchal representations of sex workers is a failed strategy, hoping that by telling society its worst truths, it would change. "By articulating the internal monologue of the world's worst women-hater, she became his mouthpiece" she said. According to her, Dworkin was incapable of seeing women saving themselves, which led to trying to force understanding "through routine, graphic exposure of our sexual wounds".

For Kathleen Lubey, professor of English, pornography can teach us many things, and Dworkin's conclusions are imprecise generalizations. "Dworkin's indictment is so sweeping that she claims pornography, from Greek antiquity to her present, levelled all women to the same status, making them into the 'lowest class of whore', the 'brothel slut available to all male citizens'", she writes. She calls to examine pornographic content, as some of the material she found from the 18th- and 19th-century pornography contained some feminist messages or some imagination of alternative realities where women's personhood is recognized. "If we refuse to recognize the vast diversity within pornography, we miss its complex accounts of sex and desire as different people in various social positions experience it", she says. She argues that certain pornography can feature "sex workers as psychologically complex human actors", and it can educate readers on gender hierarchies. In the 18th century, "pornographers knew that life in an outwardly rigid heterosexual and patriarchal society was complicated and unjust. They resisted norms that intellectuals and revolutionaries would later attack". She concludes by arguing that pornography's mixed messages might be useful in helping us "underscore the clarity with which we should enter into the messy endeavour of sex with other people".
