= Feminist biology =

Approach to biology

Feminist biology is an approach to biology that is concerned with the influence of gender values, the removal of gender bias, and the understanding of the overall role of social values in biological research and practices. Feminist biology was founded by, among others, Ruth Bleier of the University of Wisconsin–Madison (who authored the 1984 work Science and Gender: A Critique of Biology and Its Theories on Women and inspired the university's endowed fellowship for feminist biology). It aims to enhance biology by incorporating feminist critique in matters varying from the mechanisms of cell biology and sex selection to the assessment of the meaning of words such as "gender" and "sex". Overall, the field is broadly defined and pertains itself to philosophies behind both biological and feminist practice (see also feminist philosophy of science). These considerations make feminist biology debatable and conflictive with itself, particularly when concerning matters of biological determinism, whereby descriptive sex terms of male and female are intrinsically confining, or extreme postmodernism, whereby the body is viewed more as a social construct. Despite opinions ranging from determinist to postmodernist, however, biologists, feminists, and feminist biologists of varying labels alike have made claims to the utility of applying feminist ideology to biological practice and procedure.

== Contributions ==
Donna J. Haraway, a biologist and primatologist hailing from the University of California, put forth male bias criticisms in 1989 concerning the study of human evolution and culture via primatology by denoting a prominent lack of focus in female primates. Haraway contributed to a large discovery of behaviors in primate groups regarding mate selection, and female-female interactions derived from observing female primates, citing feminist influences as she studied the female primates in their own merit.

Similarly, feminist cell biologists of The Biology and Gender Study Group have criticized androcentrism in the study of behavior between sexes and "come to look at feminist critique as [they] would any experimental control." They cite a general trend of "active" biological description associated with the sperm gamete and "passive" description to the ovum, comparing such description to an archetypal hero facing many challenges before it finding its static, female home. The group criticized the diction employed by biological readings and textbooks, stating that the more active and risk-associated traits of the ovum (such as its own survival from the whittling of 2 million oocytes) are dismissed for the sake of a patterned narrative.

Anne Fausto-Sterling, a professor of Biology and Gender Studies at Brown University, assesses the complexity of defining sex through a dichotomous lens in a variety of her works such as Sexing the Body: Gender Politics and the Construction of Sexuality as well as in an article piece she wrote titled "The Five Sexes: Why Male and Female Are Not Enough". She addresses the existence of intersex individuals and the lack of acknowledgment of their state of being in the context of a dichotomously defined world of sexes – even, if not especially, by medical professionals and surgeons who understand intersex anatomy to a point to where they can surgically alter it to one of the sexes. She states: "Ironically, a more sophisticated knowledge of the complexity of sexual systems has led to the repression of such intricacy." Fausto-Sterling continues by advocating the reevaluation of what is considered urgent medical intervention in light of the influence she believes social stigma has had on standard medical procedure – which in turn could help open up the possible directions that science could take.

== Motivation ==
The motivations of advocating feminist biology are diverse. One of the most common motivations is to challenge the gender biases originated from science, by discerning a more objective, scientific truth from culturally influenced practices. Many individuals argue the emergence and development of modern science involved the domination of a female world and the exclusion of women. Reductionism, for instance, is a view that all matters in the universe are arranged hierarchically, and that causation only occurs at the lower levels of this hierarchy. A tight link exists between reductive mechanistic science and biological determinism, contributing to the argument that biological causes are the only causes, or the most important cause, of 'feminine' behavior. This link is due to the reductive assumption that causation acts in an upward direction from lower levels of organization to higher levels of organization. Many feminist biologists focus on dispelling such stigmatic prejudices that influential figures have accepted as scientifically true.

== Controversy ==
There is an ongoing debate on whether a feminist critique should be incorporated in the sciences, especially biology. Some argue that feminist biology is a form of politicization of science, calling to question the legitimacy of feminist biology altogether. On another level, there is debate even within the feminist community on how to deal with biological sex differences. Some account on the importance of accepting biological sex differences to reach gender equality, while others contend that sex differences are overly emphasized in society, contributing to gender stereotypes. Individuals such as Carla Fehr offer constructive criticism for the future of feminist philosophy in the field of biology; she proposes feminist biologists to consider novel questions pertaining to subjects such as the research of genomics in relation to gender.
