= Dawn Atkins (anthropologist) =

Anthropologist

- Born: February 13, 1962 (age 64)
- Citizenship: American
- Education: University of Iowa
- Writing career
- Genres: Nonfiction and fiction

Dawn Atkins (born February 13, 1962) is an American writer of nonfiction and fiction, as well as an activist and educator.

== Professional biography ==
Atkins founded Shadows Of..., a science fiction and fantasy magazine which ran from 1979 to 1982. Atkins worked part-time at The Moore Monitor (1980–1981). Work in all these areas earned Atkins a journalism scholarship to the University of Oklahoma. After starting OU, she also worked for The Norman Transcript (1981–1982).

In 1984, Atkins left school to accept a full-time position as Managing Editor at Locus Magazine (The Magazine Of The Science Fiction & Fantasy Field). While there, Atkins redesigned the magazine and earned a Hugo Award (1985). Atkins left Locus and returned to college in 1986, completing Bachelor of Arts (double major) in Professional Writing and Anthropology from the University of California, Santa Cruz (1989), while also working part-time as both a writing instructor at UCSC and a journalist with several local publications, including popular weekly newspaper, The Sun.

Atkins is the daughter of feminist activist, Mary E. Atkins, and with her mother had been a member of several activist organizations in both Oklahoma and California, including the National Organization for Women. Atkins and her mother were part of a movement to raise awareness of body image issues such as appearance discrimination and eating disorders. In 1988, their work led to NOW officially recognizing the need to address body image issues.

Atkins' activism on anti-discrimination led to several years as founder and chair (1989–1994) of a body image education organization, the Body Image Task Force. Atkins was also one of the co-authors and primary organizers behind the Santa Cruz City Anti-Discrimination Ordinance (1992), which added "sexual orientation, gender, height, weight and physical appearance" to the protected categories and became a model for other anti-discrimination laws in other cities.

In 1994, Atkins was accepted to the doctoral program in Anthropology at the University of Iowa. Atkins completed a master's degree in anthropology in 1996. Atkins was guest editor of special editions of the Journal of Lesbian Studies, Journal of Bisexuality and International Journal of Sexuality and Gender Studies.

Atkins was working on a dissertation for the doctoral program when traumatic injury prevented completing the program. While recovering from the injury, Atkins spent several years as owner of an on-line used and rare book store before returning to writing. Atkins' injury developed into a chronic pain disorder (fibromyalgia) which prohibited a return to anthropology or journalism. Atkins writes and edits fiction and has published several novels under pen names, including D.M. Atkins.

== Personal life ==
Atkins has also been active in Wicca and Neopaganism. She was a leader of Pagan organizations in both Santa Cruz and Iowa City, teaching introductory classes, leading public rituals and events. She was one of the founders and leaders of the Iowa Pagan Access Network (1995–1998).

== Works ==
- Atkins, Dawn (1998). Looking queer: body image and identity in lesbian, bisexual, gay, and transgender communities. New York: Haworth Press. ISBN 9781560239314.
  - Reviewed
- Atkins, Dawn (1999). Lesbian Sex Scandals: Sexual Practices, Politics and Identities. Haworth Press. ISBN 0789005484
- Atkins, Dawn (2002). Bisexual Women in the Twenty-First Century. Haworth Press. ISBN 978-1-56023-303-9
- Atkins, D.M. and Chris Taylor (2009). Faewolf. Circlet Press. ISBN 978-1-885-865-67-0
- Atkins, D.M. (2015). Crossed Rose. Fantastic Fiction Publishing. ISBN 978-1-62234-236-5
