= Catherine Itzin =

American-born British theatre critic

Catherine Lenore Itzin (29 May 1944, in Iowa City, Iowa, US – 9 March 2010), also known as Cathy Itzin, was a critic specialising in alternative theatre and later an advisor on women's issues.

Itzin immigrated to Britain in the late 1960s and completed an MPhil at University College London and a PhD at the University of Kent some years later. A co-editor of Theatre Quarterly until 1977 she began the Alternative Theatre Directory as a short section of the journal in 1971; the directory itself had become a substantial periodical by 1975. She was drama critic of Tribune for about a decade, and wrote a history of the alternative theatre movement, published as Stages in the Revolution: Political Theatre in Britain Since 1968 (1980).

She was an Honorary Research Fellow in the Violence, Abuse and Gender Relations Research Unit, Department of Applied Social Studies at the University of Bradford.

The editor of Pornography: Women, Violence and Civil Liberties, a collection of essays published by Oxford University Press which explores the impact pornography has on the perception and treatment of women. She was for a time a member of the executive committee of the Liberty pressure group.

She was married to Wojciech Itzin-Borowy and had two children. Itzin died in 2010, aged 65, from duodenal cancer.

== Selected works ==
- Gender, Culture and Organizational Change Putting Theory into Practice by Catherine Itzin and Janet Newman (2003)
- I Don't Feel Old: Experience of Later Life by Paul Thompson, Catherine Itzin and Michele Abendstern (1990)
- Pornography: Women, Violence and Civil Liberties (1993)
- Stages in the Revolution: Political Theatre in Britain Since 1968 (1980)
- Splitting Up: Single Parent Liberation (1980)
- Twentieth Century Polish Theatre edited by Bohdan Drozdowski; English translations (from the Polish) edited by Catherine Itzin (1979)
